= National Development Plan (Brunei) =

Large infrastructure developments in Brunei

- Rancangan Kemajuan Negara رانچڠن كماجوان نڬارا
- Type of project: Development planning
- Founder: Sultan Omar Ali Saifuddien III
- Country: Brunei Darussalam
- Launched: 1953; 73 years ago
- Budget: ▲$6.25 billion BND (2024)
- Status: Ongoing
- Website: deps.mofe.gov.bn

The National Development Plan (NDP) or natively known as Rancangan Kemajuan Negara (RKN), is the name assigned by the government of Brunei to a plan designed to carry out Wawasan Brunei 2035 and diversify the economy by putting projects, programs, and initiatives into action. The RKN and planning were carried out under the direction of the Department of Economic Planning and Statistics (DEPS).

In 17 National Housing Scheme (RPN) zones covering a total area of 794 hectares (1,960 acres), 30,296 homes were built under the Landless Indigenous Citizens' Housing Scheme (STKRJ) and the Land Scheme since the scheme's introduction in 1984. Under the two housing schemes, it has used land lots comprising 5,525 hectares (13,650 acres) hectares across four districts have been awarded since the program's inception in 1984. This information was disclosed on 9 February 2023. The program is administered and maintained nationally by the Housing Development Department (JKP).

== Background ==
In the 16th century the Brunei empire was a prosperous and well-managed maritime power. But by the late 19th century, internal conflicts and abuses by foreign and local actors led to its decline, with Brunei approaching collapse by 1904. Widespread corruption, abuses of power, and a poorly planned system contributed to its deterioration, demonstrating how inadequate preparation and unclear future planning can severely undermine a state's stability.

During the British Residence period (1906–1959), Brunei experienced significant administrative and economic changes. With a population of around 20,000 between 1906 and 1941, it wasn't until the 1960s that Brunei's demographic size began to approach the approximately 25,000 people from the mid-1850s. The first British resident, Malcolm McArthur, played a crucial role in stabilising the country's governance and geographical order by implementing key reforms. He established police stations, civil and criminal courts, mail services, customs offices, and wharves. These foundational developments set the stage for Brunei's economic recovery and growth, even before the commercial exploitation of its oil resources. Subsequent British Residents observed rapid trade growth and the country's transition towards true prosperity following years of decline.

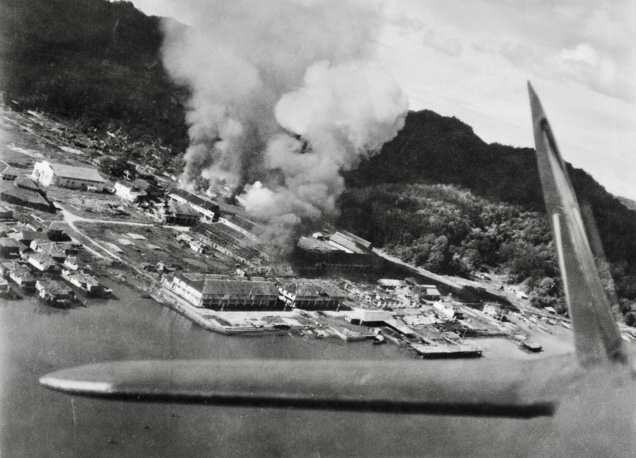
Brunei Town being attacked by a RAAF Bristol Beaufighter in 1945

The discovery and commercialisation of oil marked the beginning of a transformative period for Brunei. Among the top oil producing nations in the world by the 1930s was Brunei, particularly inside the British Commonwealth. Due to its economic growth, Brunei was able to shift from "rags to riches." But this progress was halted due to World War II. The Japanese occupation and subsequent Allied bombing strikes completely devastated Brunei. Seria's oil wells were set on fire, and Brunei Town was severely damaged, with just a Chinese temple still standing. With the sultanate in ashes, the war's devastation halted Brunei's economic growth.

Following the Second World War the government gave food distribution and the restoration of basic necessities first priority. Reconstruction of about 200 business houses and new government offices handled much of the war damage by early 1953 as rehabilitation activities got underway swiftly. During Sultan Omar Ali Saifuddien III's reign, Brunei saw substantial advancements in its political system and infrastructure. His assistance was essential in bringing Brunei from under British protectorate to full independence. The 1959 Constitution of Brunei, which abolished the British Resident's power and installed a British High Commissioner in its place, was one of his greatest accomplishments. By doing this, the Sultan was given his internal sovereignty back and became the ultimate executive head of government. The five-year national development plans were introduced by the Sultan to support Brunei's post-war reconstruction and modernisation.

== RKN in the 20th century ==
=== RKN 1 (1953–1958) ===
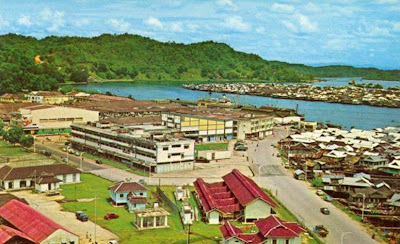
Brunei Town in the 1950s

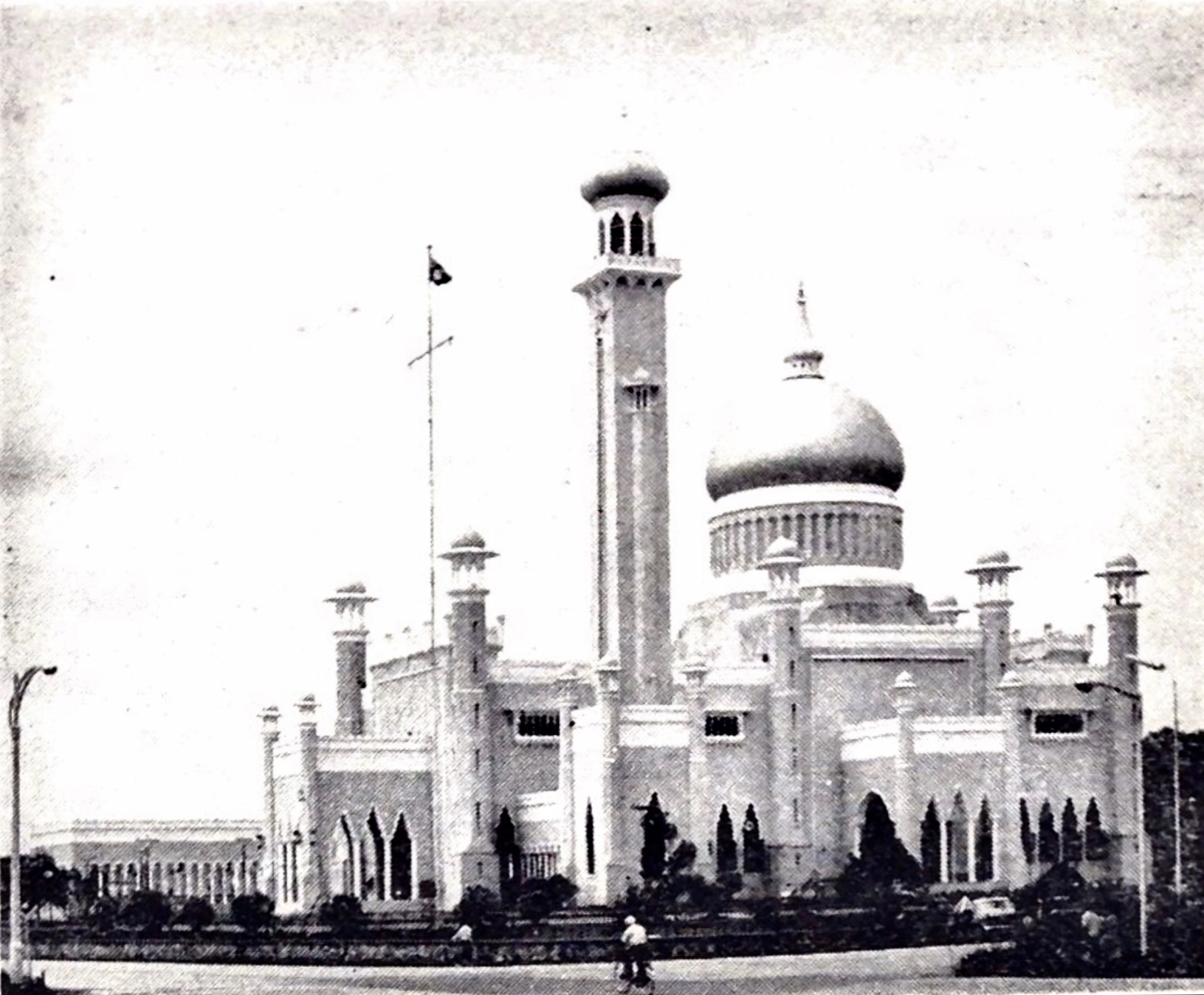
The newly built Omar Ali Saifuddien Mosque in 1958

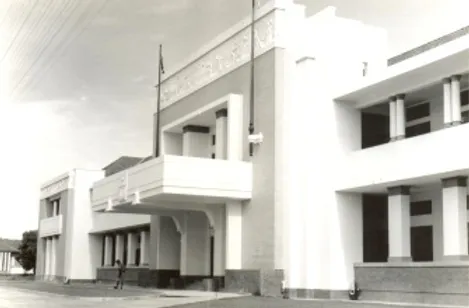
Secretariat Building in 1954

Initiated in 1953 and spanning from 1953 to 1958, the first national development plan (RKN 1) played a crucial role in the transformation of Brunei. Prior to its establishment, Brunei was seen as a less developed and economically deprived country. The strategy signaled a paradigm change that helped Brunei become a nation with high GDP per person and a high standard of living. A "bloodless revolution" was how observers characterised the advancement because of the extent of the improvements made, which was especially remarkable considering Brunei's tiny population at the time. the nation's first 5-Year Development Plan was started when the State Council authorised $100 million for the five-year term, because of Sultan Omar Ali Saifuddin III's leadership. The principal objectives were to improve living conditions, modernise the nation while maintaining the framework of the Melayu Islam Beraja, raise Brunei's standing in Southeast Asia, and expand the non-oil and gas sector. To monitor the plan's execution, E. R. Bevington, a British expatriate from the Colonial Office in Fiji, was named Commissioner of Development.

The $100 million was distributed across a number of important projects:

- Increasing access to healthcare and education
- Putting relocation plans into action
- Water supply
- Enhancing fishing practices and agricultural practices
- Extending communication networks and highways
- Building structures such as bridges and power plants
- Installing phone and television networks

Under RKN 1, infrastructure development received nearly 59% of the budget, with 21.77% going to welfare, health, and education. The plan gave increasing social welfare a lot of attention, which raised Bruneians' standard of life significantly. A pension plan for the disabled and those over 60 was one of the major social welfare projects implemented; it began in 1957 and paid $20 per month. Due to the plan's sustained emphasis on social welfare, qualified Bruneians now receive $250 each month, a testament to the program's enduring success. Important projects completed during this time were the building of new wharves at Brunei Town and Kuala Belait, the construction of the main road connecting Brunei to Tutong and Belait, and the preliminary design for a future port at Muara. In Brunei Town and Kuala Belait, automatic phone exchanges were installed, along with the Old Airport. In addition, a hospital and more than thirty new schools were constructed in Kuala Belait. The plan also highlighted the need for economic diversification away from the oil sector, putting out plans for things like improved waste gas use, improved agricultural practices, rubber replanting, and a sharper emphasis on the fishing sector.

More than 59.78% of the funding for the first national development plan was earmarked for building infrastructure, with 21.77% going toward welfare, health, and education. It acknowledged that Brunei's economy needed to be more diversified than only the oil sector. Initiatives including better using waste gas, enhancing agricultural practices, planting rubber again, and highlighting the fishing industry were all part of the plan. Despite this, the majority of attempts for economic diversity failed. The waste gas schemes for the production of cement, nitrogen fertiliser, aluminum, and other materials never came to be. After the Korean War, rubber prices fell, making replanting unsuccessful.

The concept also called for the construction of a deepwater Muara Port. The necessary power was obtained, and research was done to provide electricity to remote regions. Under the strategy, efforts were undertaken to eradicate malaria with the assistance of the World Health Organization. Malaria cases decreased from 300 in 1953 to just 66 in 1959 as a result of effective efforts. Additionally, from 20 deaths per thousand in 1947 to 11.3 deaths per thousand in 1953, the death rate was reduced. This has been linked to improvements in drainage, public cleanliness, and the availability of piped fresh water for the populace. The entire amount spent on education by 1958 was $4 million. With the development of new roads and the 1954 completion of Old Airport renovation, communications were also enhanced. Under the plan, a $14 million gas industrial facility was constructed.

By authorising the construction of mosques and suraus across Brunei, the Sultan also significantly contributed to the country's Islamic revival. His efforts were most notable for the 1958 opening of the Omar Ali Saifuddien Mosque, representing the Islamic tradition of Brunei. Brunei witnessed a transition under his direction that set the stage for its current identity and system of government.

Other than that, the government started relocating Kampong Ayer's population to the land in the 1950s with the goal of granting them the ability to own property and raise crops to support themselves. The first relocation plan was implemented in 1952 when Kampong Bunut Perpindahan was established. A second migration that resulted in the creation of Kampong Burong Pingai Berakas and Kampong Pancha Delima in 1953 came after this. The development of Kampong Pengiran Siraja Muda Delima Satu, Kampong Anggerek Desa, and Kampong Orang Kaya Besar Imas in 1954 marked the beginning of larger relocation efforts. With the founding of Kampong Jaya Setia and Kampong Jaya Bakti in 1960, Kampong Ayer underwent its third relocation plan.

=== RKN 2 (1962–1966) ===
Following the first plan, the second national development plan for 1962–1966 sought to advance social conditions and the economy. But prior to the start of RKN 3 in 1975, there existed a space. With a budget of $543 million, the RKN 2 seeks to advance and enhance Bruneians' social, cultural, and economic spheres of existence. The plan consists of fourteen clearly defined goals, such as:

- Diversification of the economy
- Increasing productivity to raise per capita income
- Preserving a high degree of employment and a comparatively steady level of prices
- Establishing a sufficient and all-encompassing national education system
- Constructing a thorough national health system
- Supplying sufficient infrastructure for public services
- Encouraging and facilitating the private sector's involvement

A Planning Committee with representatives from several ministries was entrusted with creating their own plans for this plan, which was introduced four years after the first. The plan's formulation also involved input from eight advisory groups. Diversification and the reduction of regional growth inequalities were the main economic goals of NDP 2, with a sustained increase in per capita GDP being given top priority. A national health care, a comprehensive education system, and increased income distribution equity were among the other main objectives. With an emphasis on enhancing fisheries and forest productivity, as well as raising agricultural output through pilot projects for both new and current crops including coffee, groundnuts, and maize, the main objective was to provide necessary economic and social infrastructure.

As with RKN 1, transportation, communications, and infrastructure received around 54% of the entire budget, with housing and education receiving the greatest shares. NDP 2 had a B$492 million overall budget, but like the first plan, it had poor budget management, which led to significant spending increases, especially in education, where spending more than doubled between 1966 and 1968. The plan's timeline was greatly expanded; some of its actions persisted until the end of 1972.

RKN 2 primarily aims to further accelerate Brunei's social and economic advancement. The area devoted to commercial rice growing, which would strengthen the country's agricultural sector and reduce the need to import rice from outside, was one clear sign of economic progress. People can also learn how to cultivate other crops, such as wheat, peanuts, bananas, coffee, and others, for their own knowledge and as a consequence of exporting commodities abroad. Egg and meat output increased as part of the strategy. Throughout the strategy, the fishing sector boosted its productivity by 25%.

=== RKN 3 (1975–1979) ===
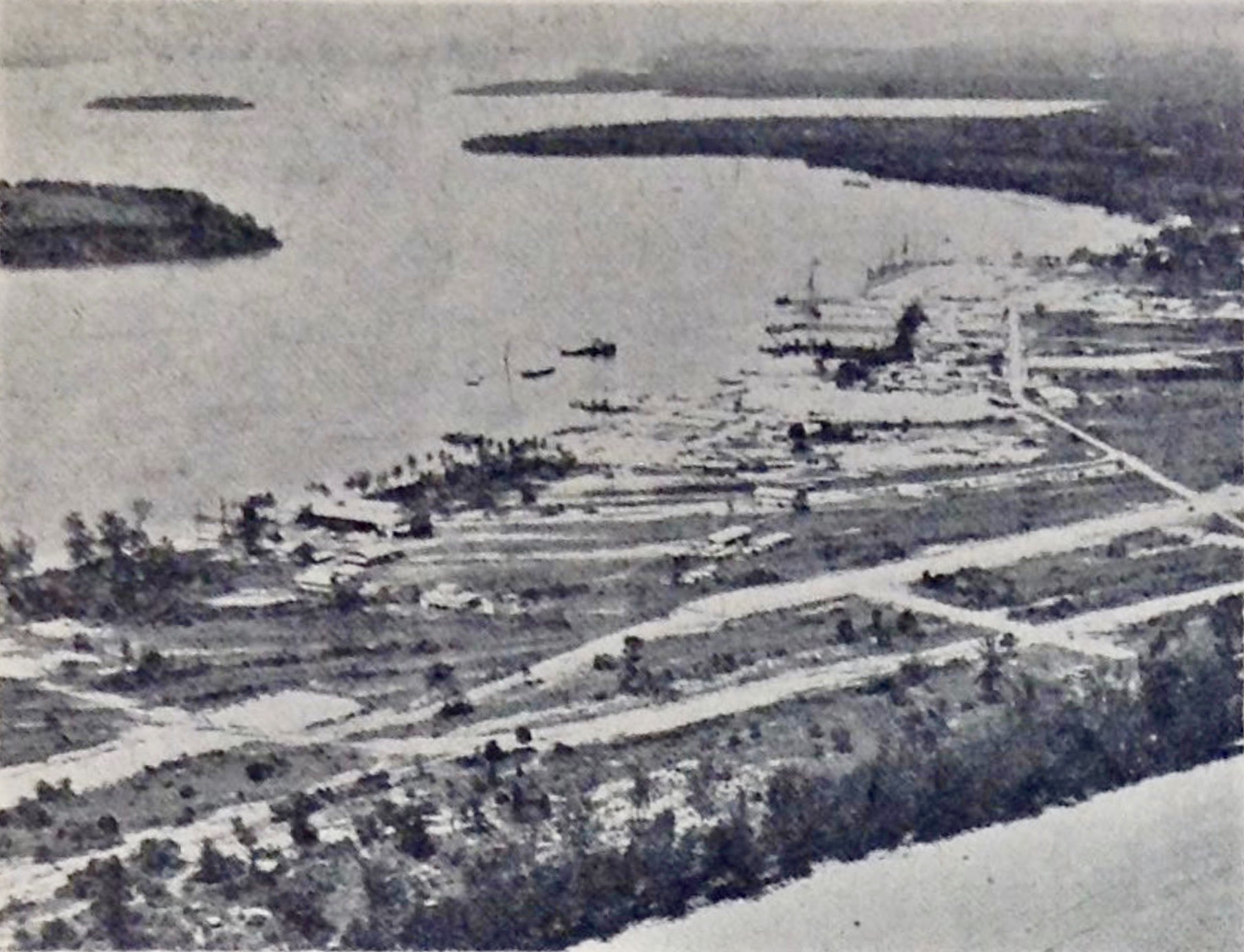
Serasa Bay and Muara in 1970

A total budget of $500 million was allotted to the third national development plan. The plan was developed and designed in accordance with the RKN 2 objectives in strengthening, improving, and further developing the economic, social, and cultural life of the people of Brunei. Preference was provided to the following goals:

- Maintain a high level of employment
- Diversify the economy through accelerated development of agriculture and industry

The plan was created between 1973 and 1975, a time when government revenues more than quadrupled. Consequently, the Economic Planning Unit was created in 1973 with the express intent of adopting measures for more stringent financial management as well as coordinating and overseeing development plans. The plan placed a strong emphasis on diversification as a means of resolving the structural imbalance in the economy, which was recognized as a crucial concern. This includes encouraging expansion in industries seen to be critical to the long-term viability of the economy, such as manufacturing, forestry, fisheries, and agriculture. Over the course of its execution, the plan sought to generate 10,000 new employment and a 6% annual GDP growth rate.

In order to draw in both international and domestic investment in industrial endeavors, the Economic Development Board was also established, based on Singapore's model, mainly by providing tax breaks and other advantages. Nevertheless, only a tiny percentage of financing went toward forestry, fishery, agricultural, and industrial initiatives, despite the intention of diversifying Brunei's economy. Instead, the majority of the funds were used to improve infrastructure, including roads, water supplies, telecommunications, healthcare, and education. Consequently, the GDP contribution of the non-oil sector stayed constant at about 20%, while the contributions of non-oil industry and agriculture actually decreased. A pulp mill, an ammonia-urea plant, and a glass manufacturing business were among the significant industrial undertakings that failed. The proposal had a total budget of B$533,554,000.

The Department of Relocation was established in 1970, and in 1976 it conducted a survey to determine the housing needs under the RPN, which was executed nationwide through the Department of Relocation. The concurrent reorganisation of agriculture and industry has been viewed in all development plans as the best way to address the imbalances in the economy. However, such language frequently conflicts with the real financial commitments made to support such a strategy. As a result, in RKN 3, real development spending allocated to the industry accounted for just 0.1% of the total ($760,000), as opposed to 1.8% ($9 million) that was anticipated.

=== RKN 4 (1980–1984) ===
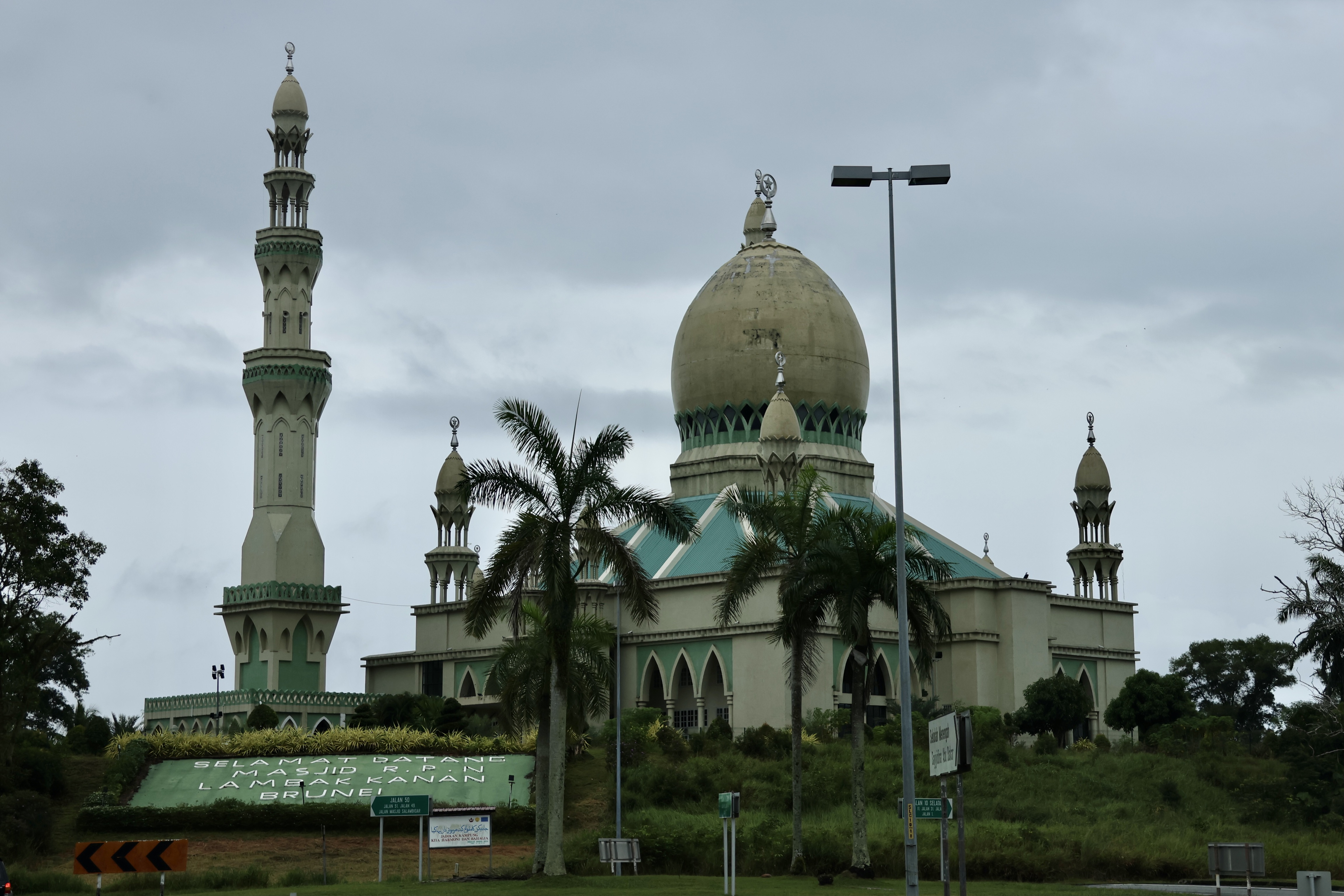
Perpindahan Lambak Kanan Mosque

The fourth national development plan, which has a $2.2 billion budget, has a strong emphasis on advancing and promoting the people's social, cultural, and economic well-being. There are four key components to this plan:

- Political component that contributed to Brunei's independence in 1983 and was crucial to preserving the country's peace, security, and prosperity
- Growing awareness of the need to preserve energy supplies as a result of the ongoing rise in oil prices
- Shifting geopolitical conditions in the surrounding nations
- Growing challenges in sourcing inexpensive immigrant labour from surrounding nations

NDP 4 was developed by taking into account the state's developments as well as the advantages and disadvantages of previous plans. In order to achieve an annual GDP growth rate of at least 6% and a yearly rise in per capita income of 4%, it implemented a number of fiscal and development initiatives. High employment rates, economic diversification through non-oil industries and agriculture, inflation management, income inequality reduction, education expansion, and the construction of rural clinics were among the goals of the plan. NDP 4's overall budget was B$1.75 billion, three times as much as NDP 3, while less was spent on forestry, industry, agriculture, and fisheries. The allocations for social services, health care, and education stayed the same, while almost 31% of the total was allocated to public building and security. Notwithstanding these initiatives, a downturn in oil output and prices caused the GDP to fall by more than 4%, although employment growth surpassed forecasts, increasing by almost 4.5 percent.

The plan was used by the government to launch the first RPN in the 1980s. Kampong Ayer's relocation plan was established in 1983 with the creation of RPN Serasa and Kampong Perpindahan Mata-Mata. The first pilot program for RPN Lambak Kanan was established in 1984.

=== RKN 5 (1986–1990) ===
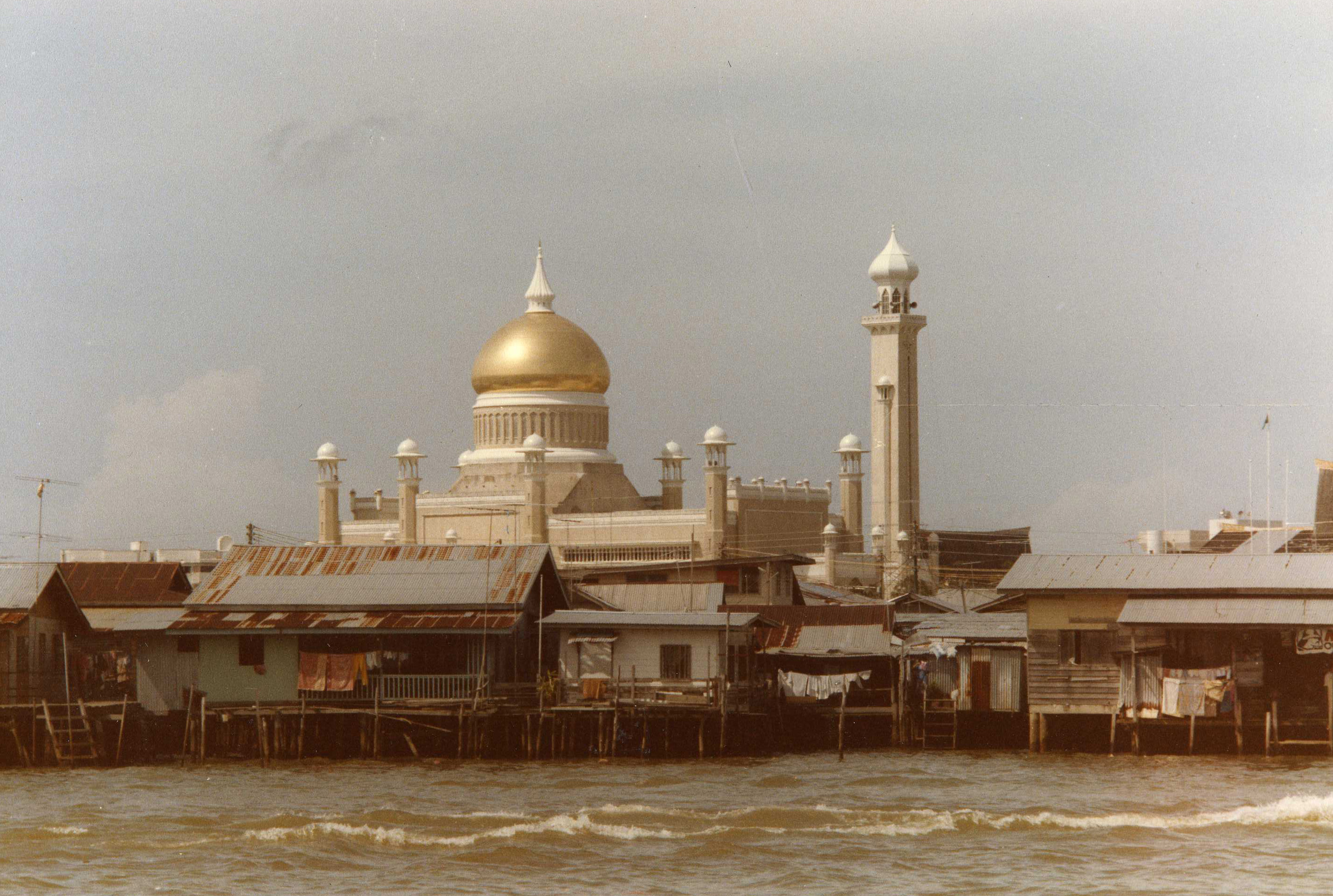
Kampong Ayer and Omar Ali Saifuddien Mosque in 1985

With a budget of $3.7 billion, the fifth national development plan seeks to further the nation's social and economic advancement by offering a range of services and amenities that raised people's standards of living. The following strategies were established in the plan:

- Maximising the nation's economic use of its natural resources
- Increasing funding for the productive sectors
- Quickening the development of human resources
- Enhancing facilities for industrial development.

This plan, introduced after independence, had broader goals than its predecessors, emphasising economic diversification, human resource development, and fostering Bruneian entrepreneurship. With a budget of B$2,610,000, it allocated 10 percent to industrial development, aiming for a 10 percent annual increase in non-oil investments. To support this, institutions such as the Development Bank and programs like a National Training Scheme and an expanded Institute of Technology were planned, along with a National Pension Scheme. The plan achieved some success, with private sector employment rising from 29,973 in 1986 to 53,613 in 1990, and GDP increasing from B$22,963 to B$29,404. Two textile factories were also established, although the non-oil sector's contribution to GDP fell from 66.4 percent to 53.0 percent between 1986 and 1990. However, the National Pension Scheme and Development Bank did not materialise as intended.

The RKN 5 listed many areas where action was required and touched on some of the challenges faced by the industrial sector. A review of the land code, initiatives to support a class of Malay entrepreneurs (modeled after Malaysian New Economic Policy), the creation of a development bank, the establishment of a national employee provident fund or pension plan, and the rollout of a national training program were among them. Some other ideas that were put out were the privatization of some public services, the creation of public firms through direct involvement or joint ventures, and the offering of various incentives for the development of the private sector. It has been stated that the government will aggressively invest in high-risk areas, without naming specific businesses.

=== RKN 6 (1991–1995) ===
With a budget of $5.5 billion, the sixth national development plan seeks to address the demands of the nation, particularly with regard to raising the standard of living and enhancing the quality of life for its citizens while also bolstering the country's economy. The following goals were stressed in this RKN:

- Enhance the development of human resources
- Broaden the economic base and foster an environment that was conducive to industry
- Maximising public sector spending
- Maintaining the growth of the oil and gas industry
- Promoting the creation of a robust private sector
- Keeping the environment clean and healthful

Approximately 2,000 job-creation initiatives totaling B$5.5 billion were included in this plan with the goal of creating 40,000 job opportunities in the manufacturing, finance, and service sectors in order to create a sustainable and varied economic basis. As with earlier programs, encouraging the growth of the non-oil industry and lowering dependency on the government sector continued to be top priority. Along with building 11,000 new homes, the plan also called for enhancing water and electricity supplies, telecommunications, and electricity generating. To draw in more industrial investment, organisational modifications were implemented, such as the creation of a Trade and Industry Council in January 1992. In that year, Brunei dispatched a mission to Hanoi to examine bilateral economic cooperation, namely in Vietnam's growing offshore petroleum industry, which Brunei was interested in participating in, while trade delegations from Taiwan and Japan traveled to Brunei to look into investment potential.

Aiming to create 40,000 employment in the manufacturing, finance, and service sectors, B$5.5 billion was allotted to support around 2,000 projects in order to develop a sustainable and varied economic basis. Similar to earlier programs, the goal was to encourage the growth of non-oil sectors and lessen reliance on the government sector. In addition, the plan called for the building of 11,000 dwelling units, improvements to the water and energy delivery infrastructure, and telecommunications. To draw in more industrial investment, organisational modifications were implemented, such as the 1992 creation of a Trade and Industry Council. To look at potential investments, trade delegations from Taiwan and Japan traveled to Brunei in the same year.

=== RKN 7 (1996–2000) ===
Part of a 20-year long-term development program that started in 1985, the seventh national development plan had a budget of $7.2 billion. The objective of this plan was to raise the standard of living for Bruneians while highlighting the country's economic successes. With $1,402 million, or 19.5 percent of the overall allocation, the transport and communication sector is the third largest in RKN 7. The following strategies were established in the plan:

- Balanced socioeconomic development
- Ongoing environmental protection
- Effective human resource development
- Well-planned infrastructure and public facilities
- Economic diversification
- Execution of social development projects

"53% were completed, 12% were approaching completion and 12% were being implemented by the end of the plan period, whilst the remainder were either still at preliminary stages, suspended or cancelled for various reasons," according to RKN 7, which included 1,501 development programs and projects approved for implementation within this plan.

The government raised the Information Technology Division to a department in January 1996 and launched the Program Teknologi Maklumat, 'Information Technology Program' (TEMA) for public services in 1995. To make internet access easier, the BruNet service was launched in 1995. Notable IT advancements during RKN 7 included the establishment of official and local organisation websites. In 2000, Brunei became the first country to issue a Smart Identification Card by using biometric technology and a "smart card." In an effort to encourage youngsters to use computers and the internet widely, the government also allotted $13.3 million in 2000 for ICT initiatives, including as improving the BruNet system and adding computers to government schools.

Between June 1996 and June 2000, there was a notable surge in the number of government agencies adopting IT services (from 36 to 40) and the quantity of IT equipment pieces (387,187). Additionally, there were 297 employees in the IT department, up from 201, and there were now one computer for every four users. Due to the dramatic increase in BruNet users from 819 in 1995 to 13,860 in 1999, the Brunei Telecom Department (JTB) partnered with UUNct in the United States in 2000 to improve internet access with increased bandwidth and quality. The 'pre-paid net card' for internet access and 'e-speed' for quicker data transfer were two ways that JTB improved BruNet services in 2000. 'SimpurNet' was introduced by DST, and three other firms (QAF Brunei, Royal Brunei Technical Services, and BIBD) were granted licenses to provide supplementary services during this time of rapidly expanding commercial IT services. The implementation of 'e-government' was started, and the National Information Technology Council (BIT) was formed to supervise IT use across the country.

As of 17 June 2000, of the 42 projects for the RKN 7, 21 projects totalling $201 million had been finished, while 13 projects totalling $567 million were awaiting clearance. A$800 million grant was given to the Department of Electrical Services (DES) to enhance the infrastructure for power production, transmission, and distribution. To solve serious problems, the agency first reinforced the 11,000-volt distribution infrastructure in the Brunei–Muara District. Installing new structures, pipelines, and main stations was one way to upgrade the infrastructure for supplying power. Two Main Electric Stations, 66/11KV Beribi in Kampong Kiarong and Tungku-2 in Kampong Rimba, were inaugurated as part of the project.

Under RKN 7 Brunei significantly increased its broiler production from 4,663 metric tons in 1996 to 12,507 metric tons in 2000, achieving an 86% surplus over local demand. Chicken egg production also exceeded targets, rising to 87 million eggs in 2000 from 82 million in 1999, surpassing the 73 million eggs required for self-sufficiency. This growth led to higher exports than domestic consumption.

During RKN 7, Brunei achieved a near-universal clean water supply, reaching 99.9% of the population. The country had the lowest water tariff rate among ASEAN members, and home water usage was the highest relative to its population of about 300,000. This abundance and low cost of water pose a risk of decreased awareness and economisation in its usage, despite the cheap supply.

== RKN in the 21st century ==
=== RKN 8 (2001–2005) ===
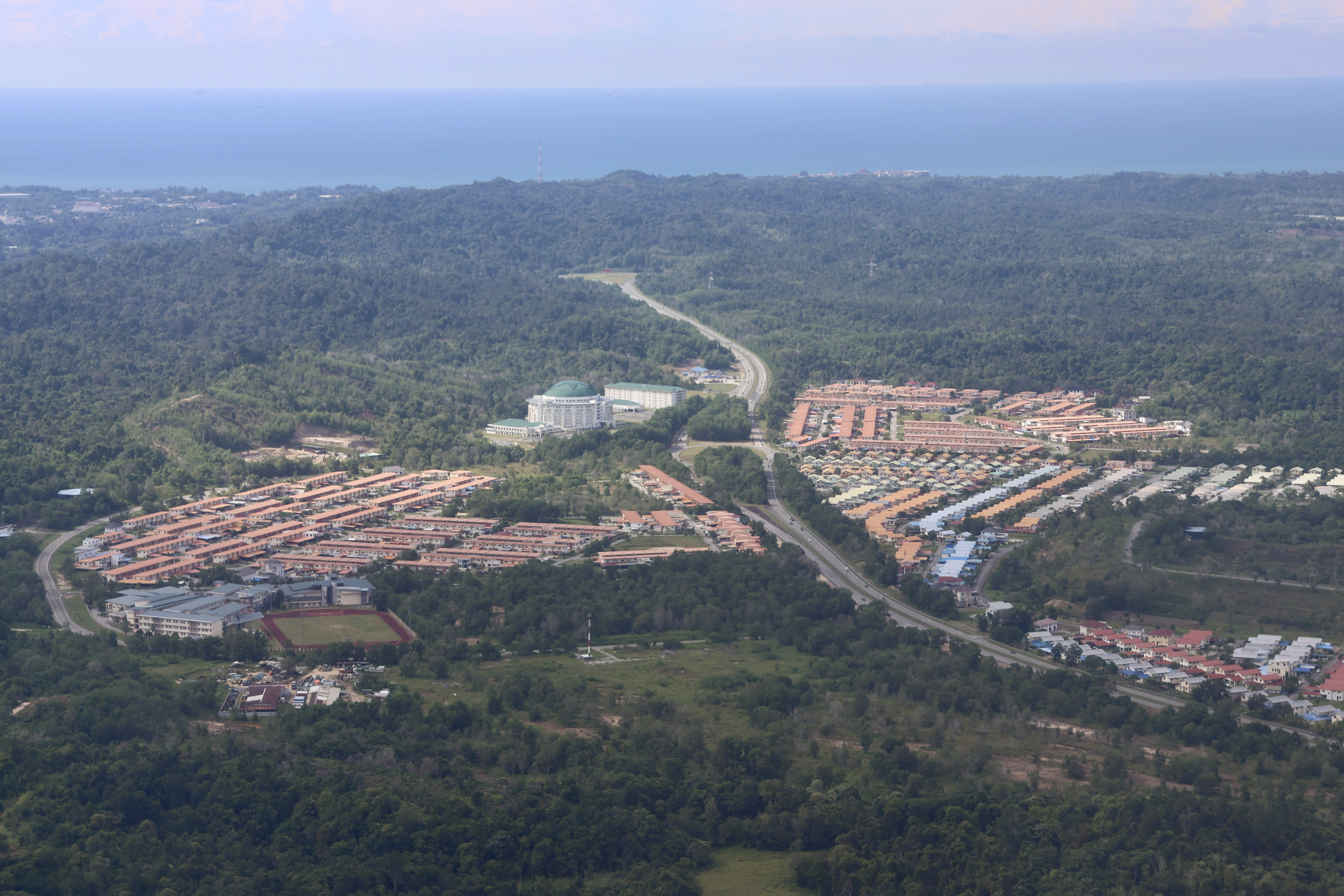
STKRJ Katok 'B'

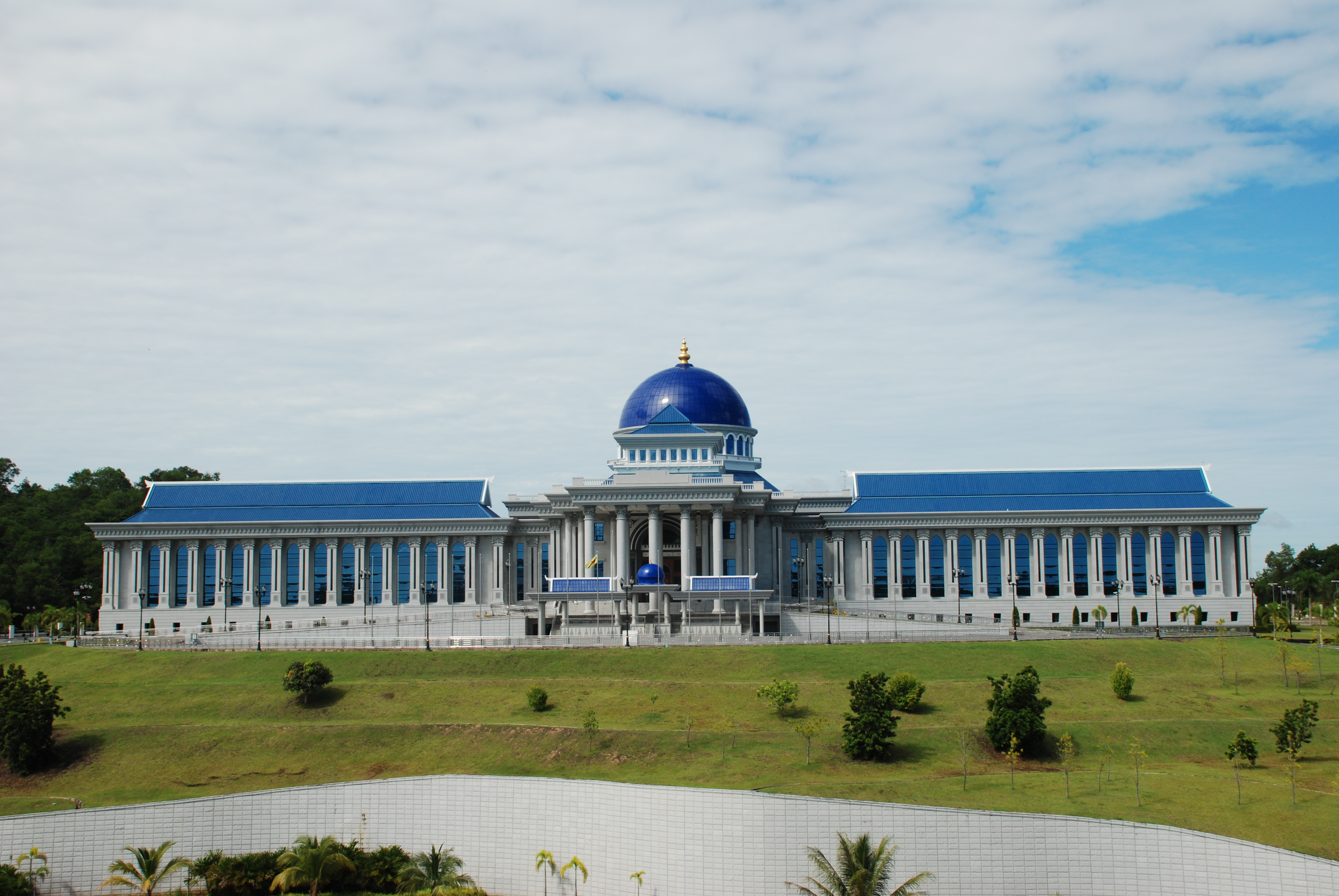
Legislative Council building

Minister Ahmad claimed that the government was focusing on drafting laws and guidelines to simplify private sector management of development projects under the Private Financial Initiative (PFI) Scheme. Additionally, research were conducted to strengthen government finances, develop the downstream oil and gas industry, expand the private sector, and enhance strategic areas and infrastructure for industrialisation and privatisation. The government also aimed to raise productivity and develop human resources through the Department of Economic Planning and Development. RKN prioritised physical elements to improve the investment climate and business environment. RKN 8 seeks to reduce unemployment by creating approximately 18,000 new job opportunities across seven categories and over 17 job types for local youth by 2005.

The eighth national development plan, allocated $9.5 billion, concentrated on enhancing and growing the following:

- Strengthening and expanding the oil and gas industry
- Promoting economic diversification
- Developing value-added industries to create new employment opportunities and boost exports
- Human resource development
- Creating a conducive environment for investment
- Enhancing infrastructural facilities
- Encouraging active participation from the private sector

In 2002, RKN 8 received a $1 billion commitment announced at the 2001 ASEAN Summit. Of this, $817.9 million was allocated to the transport and communication sector. This funding focuses on road safety initiatives, including the construction of a driving training facility, and the enhancement of telecommunications infrastructure. The plan also involves updating postal services, expanding BruNet's capacity, and developing fiber optic networks. These improvements aim to boost productivity through innovative methods, automate procedures, and enhance service delivery.

The Ministry of Communications Marine Department's priorities include enforcing maritime regulations, ensuring safety, protecting the environment, supporting the maritime industry, and developing human resources in maritime fields. As part of RKN 8, the Department of Civil Aviation plans to transform Brunei International Airport into a freight centre, offering new facilities and incentives. Meanwhile, Radio Television Brunei (RTB) implemented a master plan to introduce interactive TV, online broadcasting, and additional radio channels, supported by new studios and advanced digital TV equipment. Over RKNs 8 and 9, the Kota Batu Archaeological Park was constructed in stages. The Syariah and the Brunei Supreme Court building opened for business on 3 January 2006. It was constructed in 2001 at a total cost of more than B$14 million. It was finished in 2005. Constructed on a 10-acre area, the building has four stories and nine courtrooms, including two high court, one court of appeal, and six lower court chambers. Additionally, the plan included the Legislative Council building which began construction in March 2005.

Additionally, RKN 8 allocates $526 million, or 7.2% of the overall development budget, to advance information technology, including the creation of 'e-government' services and fundamental IT infrastructure. This initiative is expected to enhance communication tools and support various IT programs, driving advancements in e-commerce and economic development. By the end of RKN 8, 99.9% of respondents had access to clean water, compared to 99.7% in RKN 7.

=== RKN 2007–2012 ===
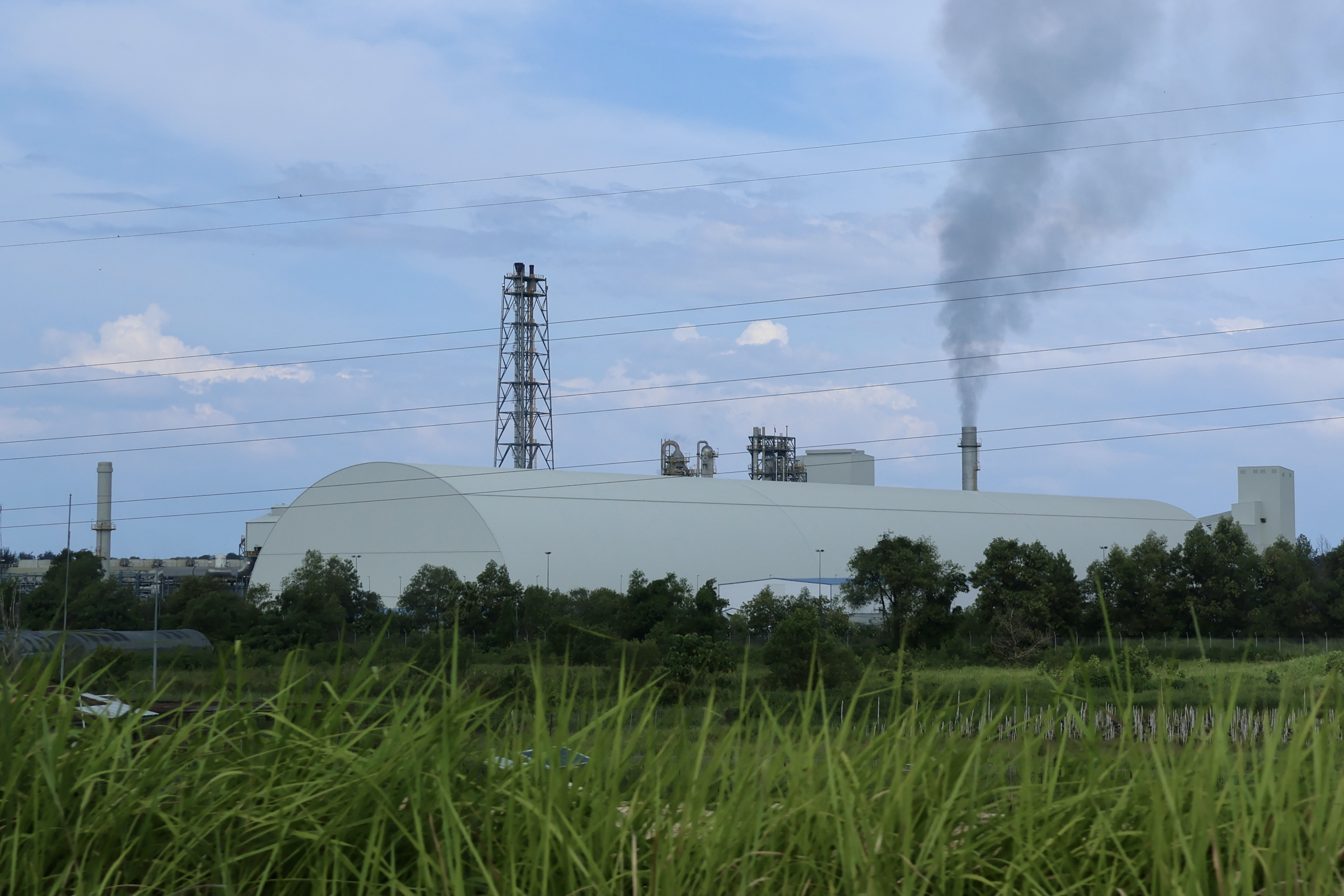
Sungai Liang Industrial Park

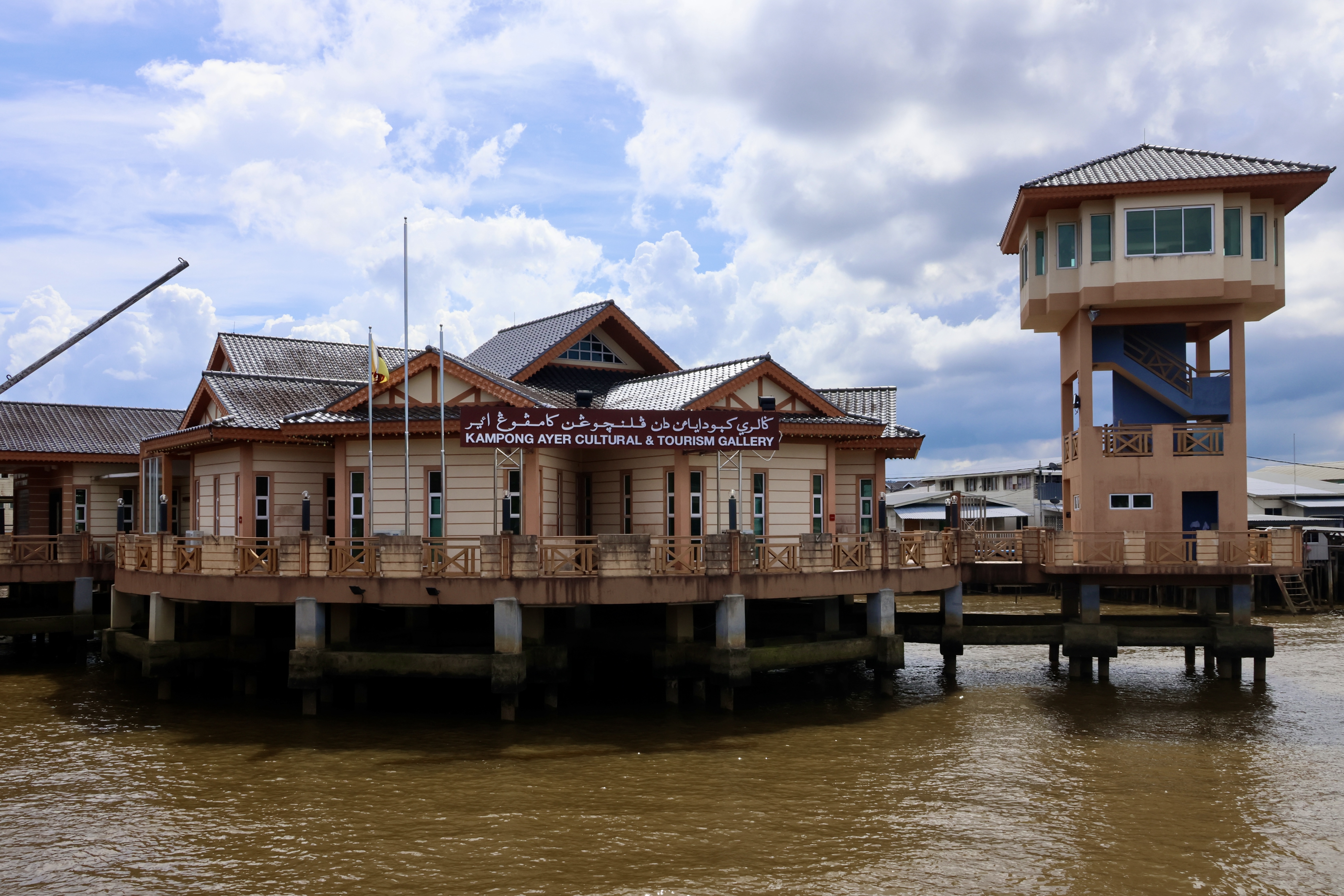
Kampong Ayer Cultural and Tourism Gallery

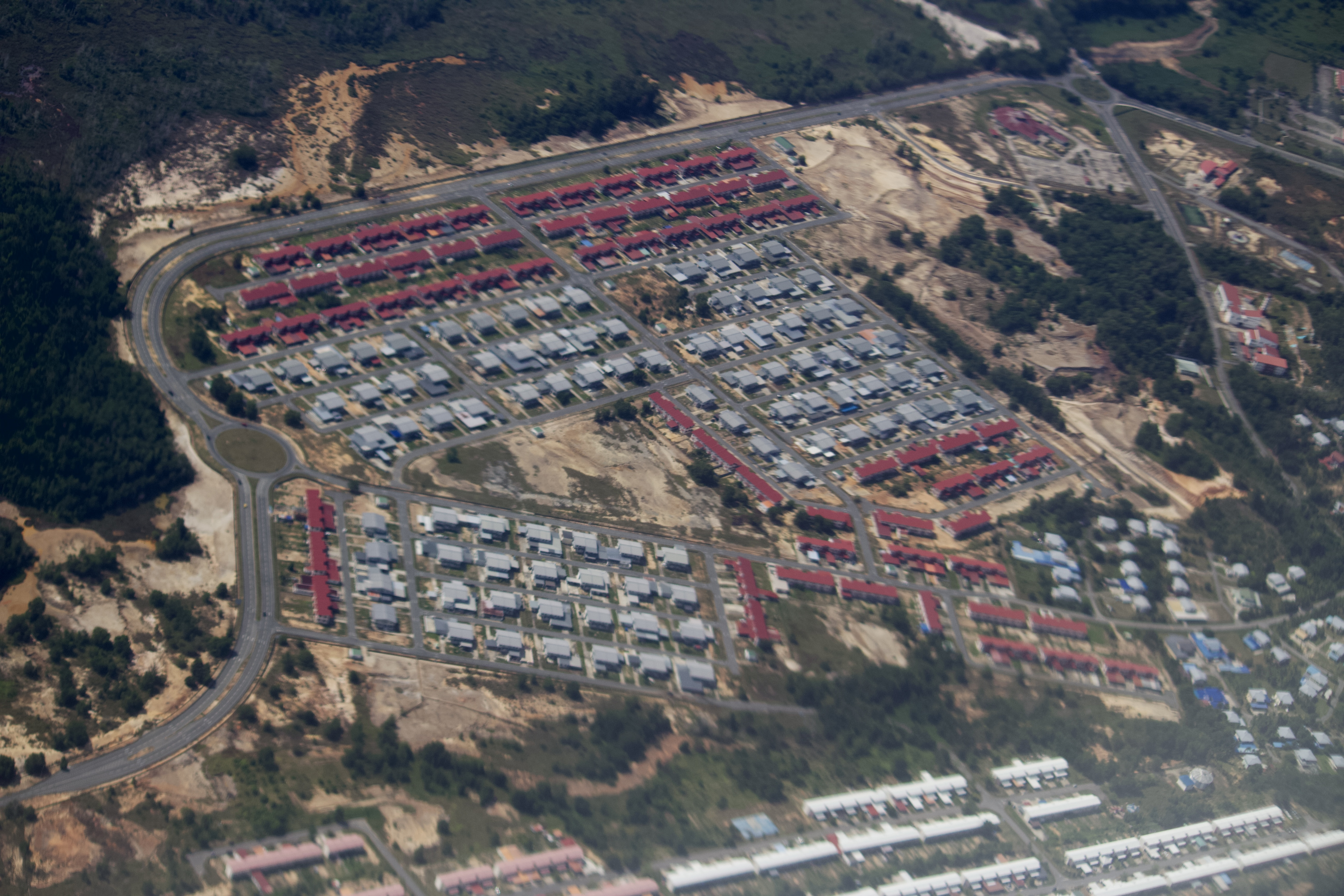
Bukit Beruang National Housing

The ninth national development plan was never referred to as RKN 9, it was officially known as RKN 2007–2012. RKN 10, however, was the tenth RKN to succeed it. In addition, The Sultan established the Long-term National Development Planning Board, whose job it was to create a development strategy and framework for a 30-year period starting with the 2006 fiscal year. The Long-term National Development Planning Board, led by Prince Mohamed Bolkiah, unveiled the plan on 17 February 2007. The plan sought to expand on the RKN 8, which prioritised economic diversification and allotted $7.3 billion, with a particular emphasis on small and medium-sized businesses and non-oil industries. Additionally, the RKN 8 made large investments in environmental and ICT projects. It was projected that the RKN 2007–2012 would direct the nation's economic growth over the ensuing five years, carrying on with initiatives to strengthen the non-oil economy, which had demonstrated notable expansion, especially in the services sector.

1,048 projects totalling $9.5 billion were approved by the government for implementation. The value of the system was split across the nine main sectors. With a $3,063 million allocation (32.3%) of the total plan value, the social services sector was given the largest share. The industry and commerce sector received $1,641 million (17.3%), while the public utilities sector received $1,316 million (13.9%). The development initiatives were public utilities, social services, environment, industry and commerce, tourism, transportation and communication, science, technology, and innovation, ICT, and security.

42.4% of the $9.5 billion value of the project was spent during the RKN period, or $4,031.1 million (77.6%) of the entire budget that was allotted. Over time, spending grew and reached a pinnacle in 2011, when it exceeded the $1 billion target with $1,024.5 million spent. The largest expenditure, amounting to $1,418 million (75.4%) of the budget, was in the social services sector, mostly because of the human resource development fund and large-scale housing initiatives. $804 million (87.0%) of the funds allotted to the industry and commerce sector went into industrial projects, such as the Sungai Liang Industrial Park. The public utilities sector spent $497 million (78.8%) of its allotted funds on projects related to the delivery of electricity and water, including the Ulu Tutong Dam and the Bukit Panggal Power Station.

A portion of the work in the Brunei–Muara District entails the formation and preparation of tender papers for the supply and installation of new pipes from Bukit Barun to the district; terminals for new reservoirs at Terunjing and Berakas; and the supply and installation of pipes from Melabau to Kota Batu. More housing projects, including relocation and public housing schemes, such as those in Rimba, Meragang, Bukit Beruang, Tanah Jambu, and Salambigar; resettlement schemes of Kampong Ayer to Lumapas 'A', Katok 'B' and Sungai Buloh/Tanah Jambu. Furthermore, other projects under the RKN consisted of the Agro-Technology Park, Kampong Ayer Cultural and Tourism Gallery, and the Suri Seri Begawan Raja Pengiran Anak Damit Mosque.

The Bangar Town Boat Terminal in the Temburong District, built at a cost of about $1.4 million, was constructed between 19 June 2008 and 19 December 2009, and officially opened on 7 January 2010. More projects to improve road infrastructure, including in the district, would be funded by the RKN 2007–2012. RKN also plans to increase the capacity of high-density roads in rural areas, replace wooden viaducts, and the Bangar–Puni–Labu Highway (Jalan Labu).

RKN 2007–2012 encountered a number of obstacles when carrying out its plans and initiatives, such as trouble obtaining project locations, frequent modifications to the scope of work, and hold-ups in project brief and tender document preparation. Project execution was made even more difficult by the protracted consultant hiring process, contractor-related problems, and the sluggish approval of change orders. The government implemented a number of initiatives to address these issues and improve implementation and expenditure rates. These included lowering bankers' guarantee rates to lessen financial constraints on contractors, creating an advisory board for consultant nominations for every ministry to expedite the process, and updating protocols for Variation Order approval. To expedite projects' completion, the government also promoted packaging, modified the procedure for tender approval, strengthened the internal technical staffing of ministries and departments, and enhanced the efficiency of project and program monitoring.

=== RKN 10 (2012–2017) ===
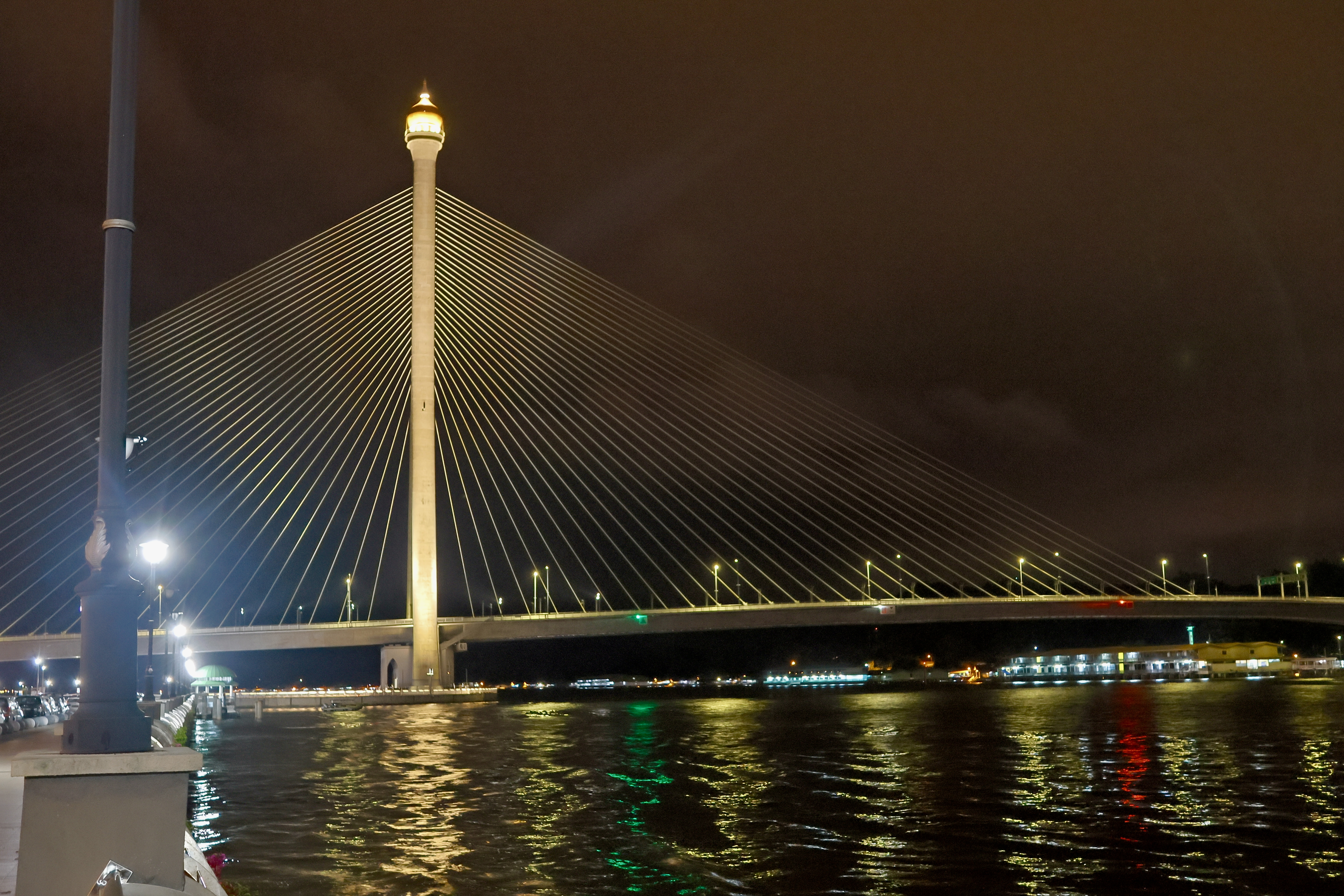
Raja Isteri Pengiran Anak Hajah Saleha Bridge at night

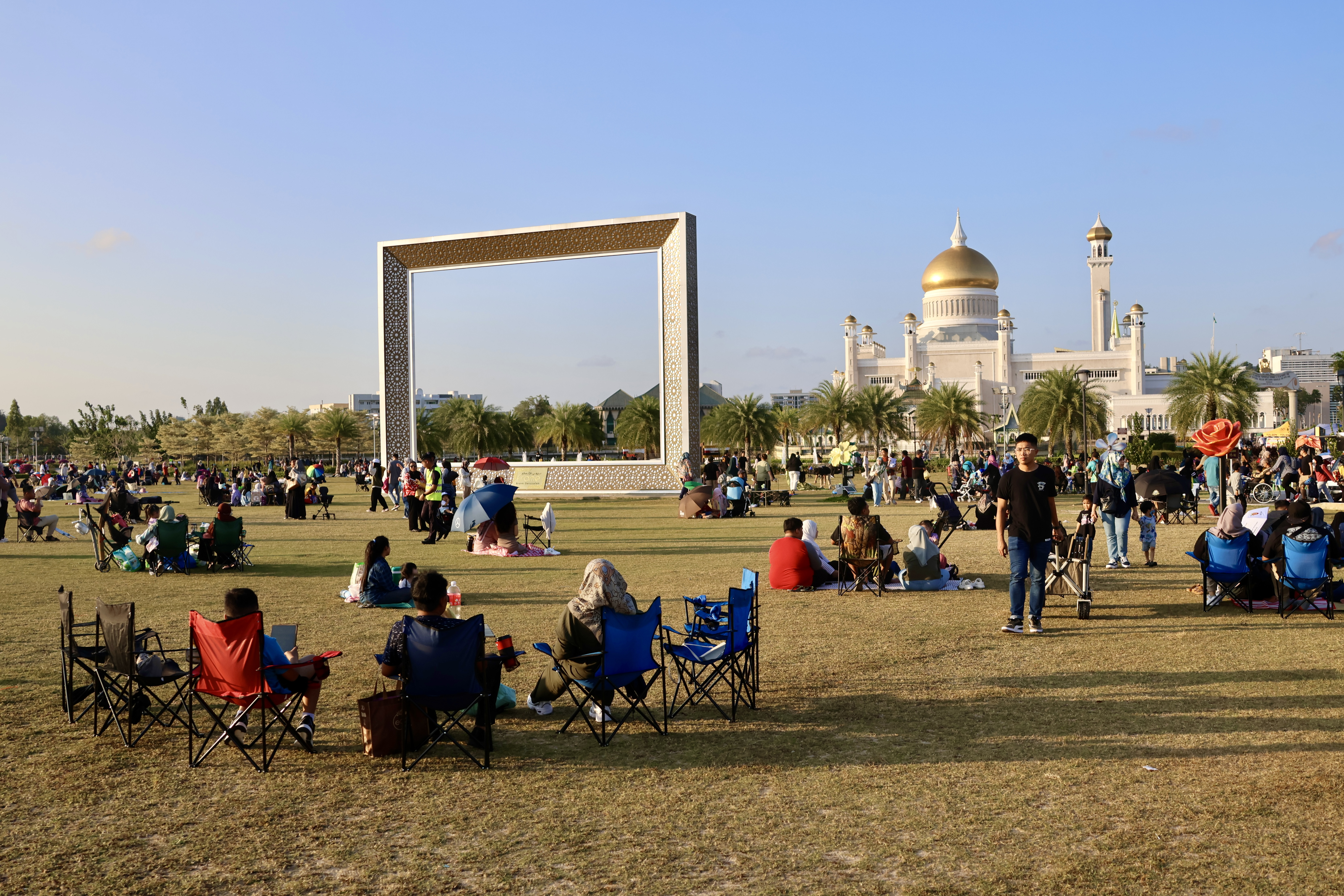
Taman Mahkota Jubli Emas

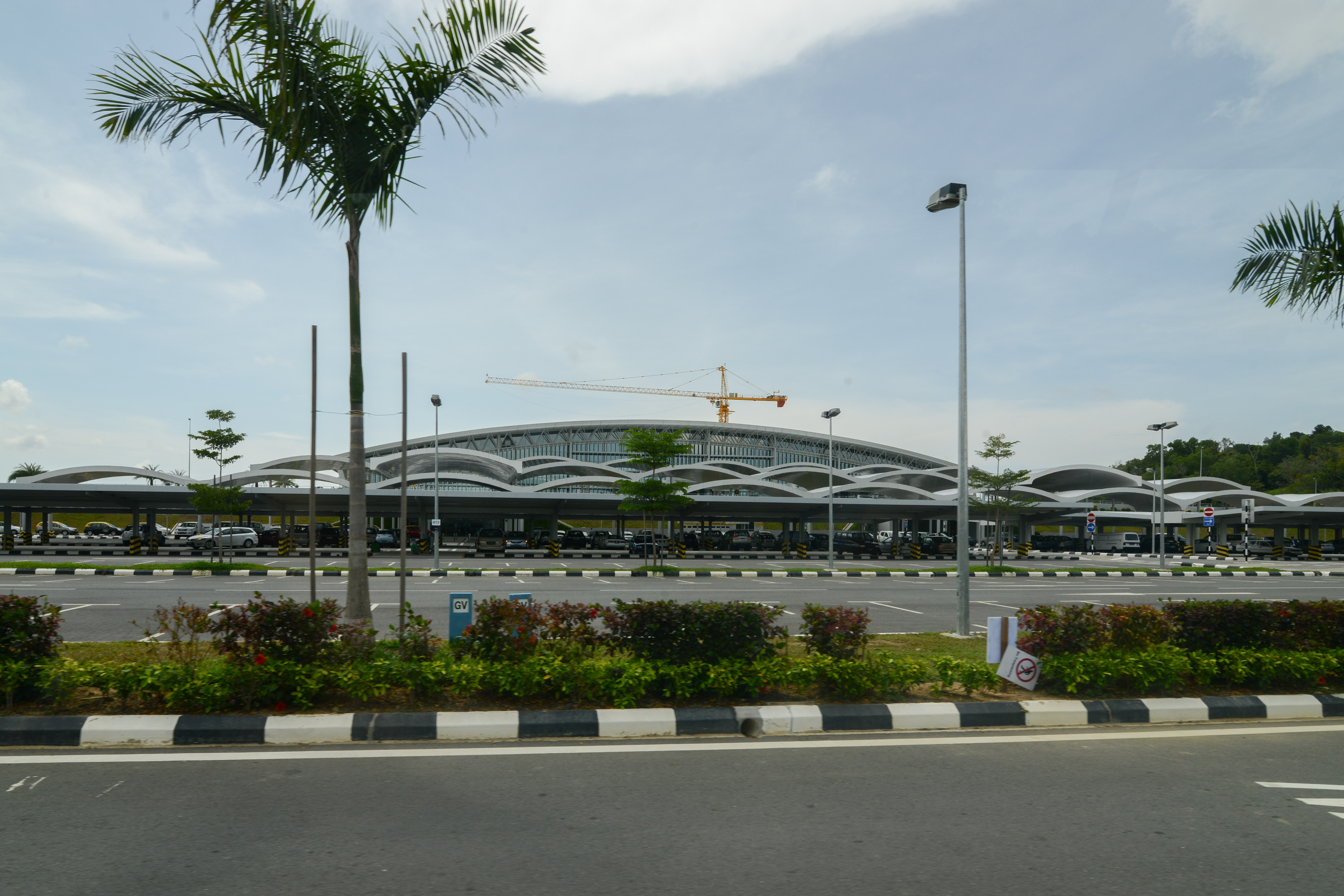
Brunei International Airport undergoing expansion in 2014

The RKN concept of "Knowledge and Innovation, Increase Productivity, Accelerated Economic Growth" guides the tenth national development plan, which focuses on developmental initiatives to achieve quicker and greater rates of growth in the economy. The budget for RKN 10 was $8.2 billion, with an additional $1.7 billion added to the total to further spur development. A total of $6.5 billion has been set aside for RKN 10. The following six strategies were established in the plan:

- Educated and highly skilled population
- High quality of life
- Conducive business environment
- Productive and progressive economy based on knowledge and innovation
- Good governance and government modernisation
- High quality and sustainable development infrastructure

RKN 10 saw the approval of 567 projects with a total scheme value of $8.2 billion by the government. The Temburong Bridge (Sultan Haji Omar Ali Saifuddien Bridge) project was transferred to RKN in Financial Year 2017–2018, extending the RKN 10 period until March 2018 and increasing the total number of projects to 568. The nine primary sectors each received a portion of the RKN 10 scheme value. The social services sector received the largest allocation of $2,621.3 million (31.9%) of the total scheme value. The public utilities sector came in second with roughly $1,409.5 million (17.1%) and the transportation and communications sector with roughly $1,293.6 million (15.7%).

Between the 568 approved projects, 465 (81.9%) were successfully completed; 30 (5.3%) were in the implementation stage; 39 (7.0%) were in the tendering stage; and 34 (5.7%) were in the design and planning stage. Other large projects like the Taman Mahkota Jubli Emas, recreational parks, the building of the flyover at the intersection of the Mengkubau Housing Highway and Muara Beach, the building of Jalan Gadong and Jalan Telanai, the building of the 4,000-unit housing project under the Mengkubau National Housing Scheme, and the renovation of the Brunei International Airport are among the completed projects.

Four large bridges to Temburong were planned and constructed. These comprised two new bridges, the Pandaruan Bridge which was supposed to be finished by late 2013 but had some minor delays when it crossed the Pandaruan River to link with Limbang, Malaysia. The Raja Isteri Pengiran Anak Hajah Saleha Bridge that link Bandar Seri Begawan to Kampong Lumapas on the Brunei River's eastern bank. In addition, the Brunei Economic Development Board (BEDB) helped to support the construction of the Pulau Muara Besar Bridge that connected Pulau Muara Besar to Muara. In August 2012, the BEDB issued a consulting contract to a joint venture consisting of Korean and Bruneians, with plans to issue a construction contract by mid-2013. The largest project, as previously mentioned, was the proposed Sultan Haji Omar Ali Saifuddien Bridge, which would have crossed the Brunei Bay to link Temburong with the mainland.

In order to promote technology and knowledge transfer, international contractors have collaborated with local businesses on BEDB's housing and infrastructure projects. Notable developments include TEE International's 1,500 apartments in Tutong, Bina Puri's 2,000 units in Kamoung Pandan, and UEM's 4,000 units in Kampong Mentiri. A joint venture between the Chinese company Third Harbour Engineering and the local company Surati Construction is overseeing the construction of the Telisai–Lumut highway, a significant infrastructure project that includes Brunei's biggest bridge to date—a 600-meter span across peat swamps—as well as an 18.6-kilometer dual carriageway.

$285.7 million under RKN 10 was allotted to the health sub-sector, of which $172.3 million was used to enhance technology use, treatment accessibility, and health infrastructure. The National Health and Medical Store Building, Rimba Health Center, Pharmacy Services Building, Tutong Dialysis Centre, the Women and Children Centre at Raja Isteri Pengiran Anak Saleha Hospital, and the Suri Seri Begawan Hospital's wards and facilities were among the noteworthy projects. Queen Saleha opened the $64.5 million RIPAS Women and Children Centre on 22 April 2015, after it was finished on 30 September 2014. The first phase of the Agro Technology Park in Kampong Tungku, covering 50 hectares and scheduled for completion in January 2013, was part of Brunei's economic diversification strategy, focusing on agroindustry and halal product manufacturing, with the full 500 hectare project expected to create over 9,000 jobs, including more than 2,000 professional positions. Other projects included the first phase of the Mechanical Training Centre and the first phase of the 6 kilometres (3.7 mi) dual carriageway Jerudong–Tungku Link Road (Tungku Highway), also expected to be completed in 2013. After that, the 5.5 km long third phase of the same highway was finished in 2016 at an estimated cost of $9.64 million.

The implementation of RKN 10 projects faced several obstacles, including a lack of suitable construction sites and frequent changes in project scopes. Delays in creating and assessing tender documents and conducting project briefings further hindered progress. The prolonged hiring process for experts and various issues related to contractors also contributed to these delays. Despite these challenges, RKN10 continues to support the Ease of Doing Business (EODB) initiative and the growth of the private sector, particularly Micro, Small, and Medium Enterprises (MSMEs), as noted in the 13th LegCo session in March 2017.

To enhance the implementation and oversight of the RKN 10 project, the government introduced initiatives requiring timely completion of projects, adherence to performance standards, and strict budget compliance. Payments had to follow project specifications, with additional funds subjected to rigorous inspection, while the RKN Project Management System emphasized value for money and average building prices. Effective oversight was maintained through regular site inspections, monthly meetings, and payment withholding for incomplete projects, with Prince Al-Muhtadee Billah supporting the program by frequently visiting project sites.

=== RKN 11 (2018–2023) ===
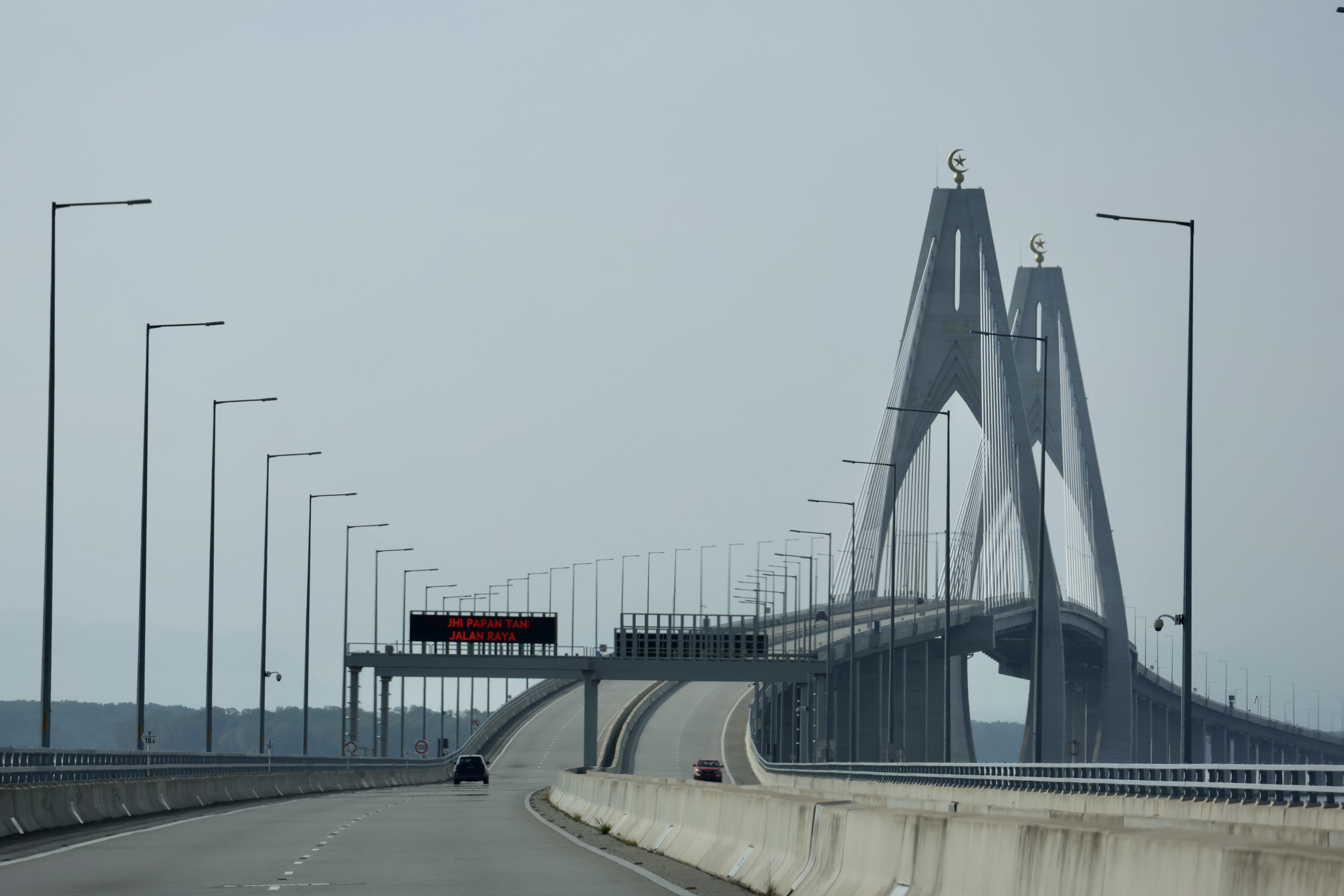
The completed Sultan Haji Omar Ali Saifuddien Bridge in 2023

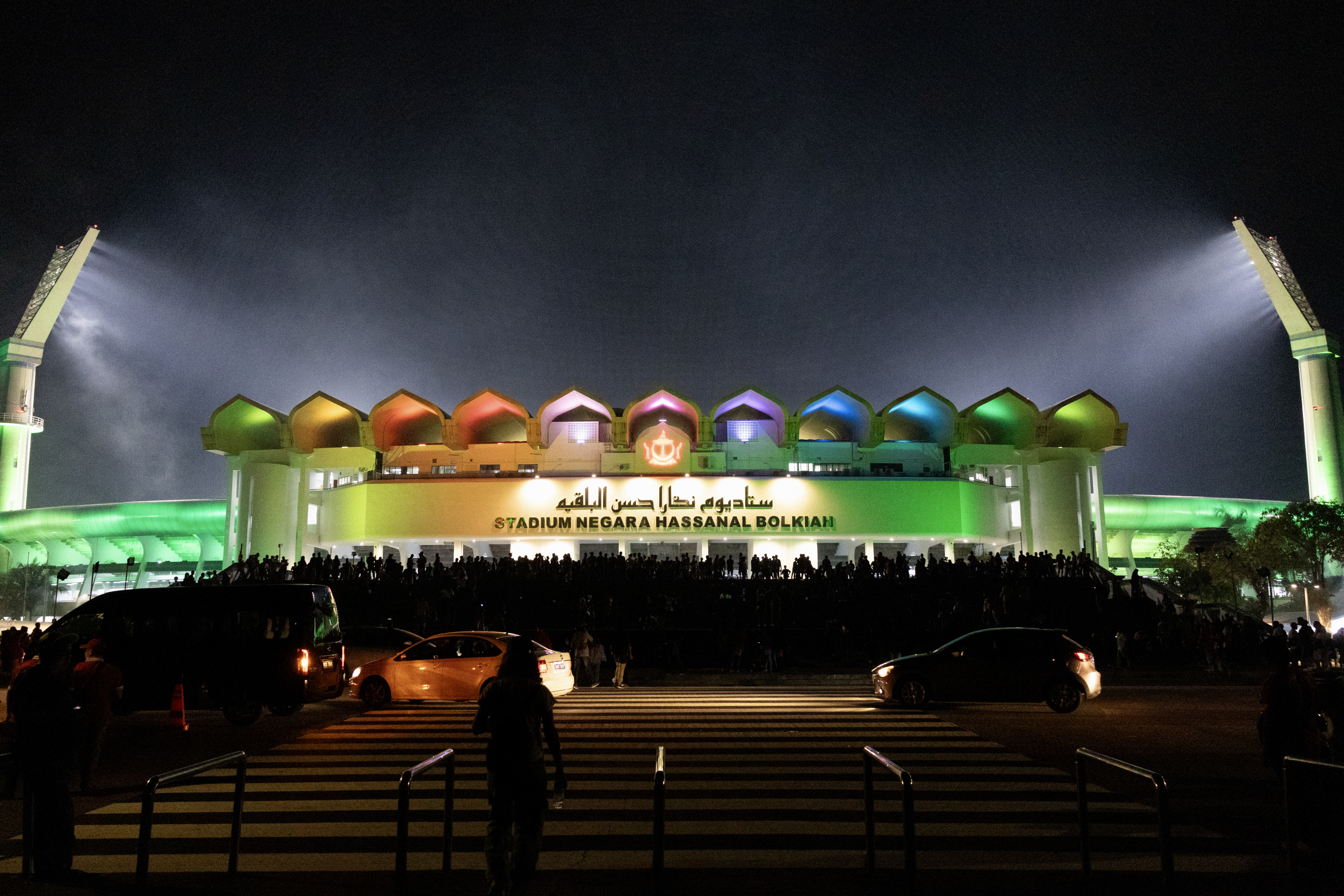
The newly renovated Hassanal Bolkiah National Stadium at night

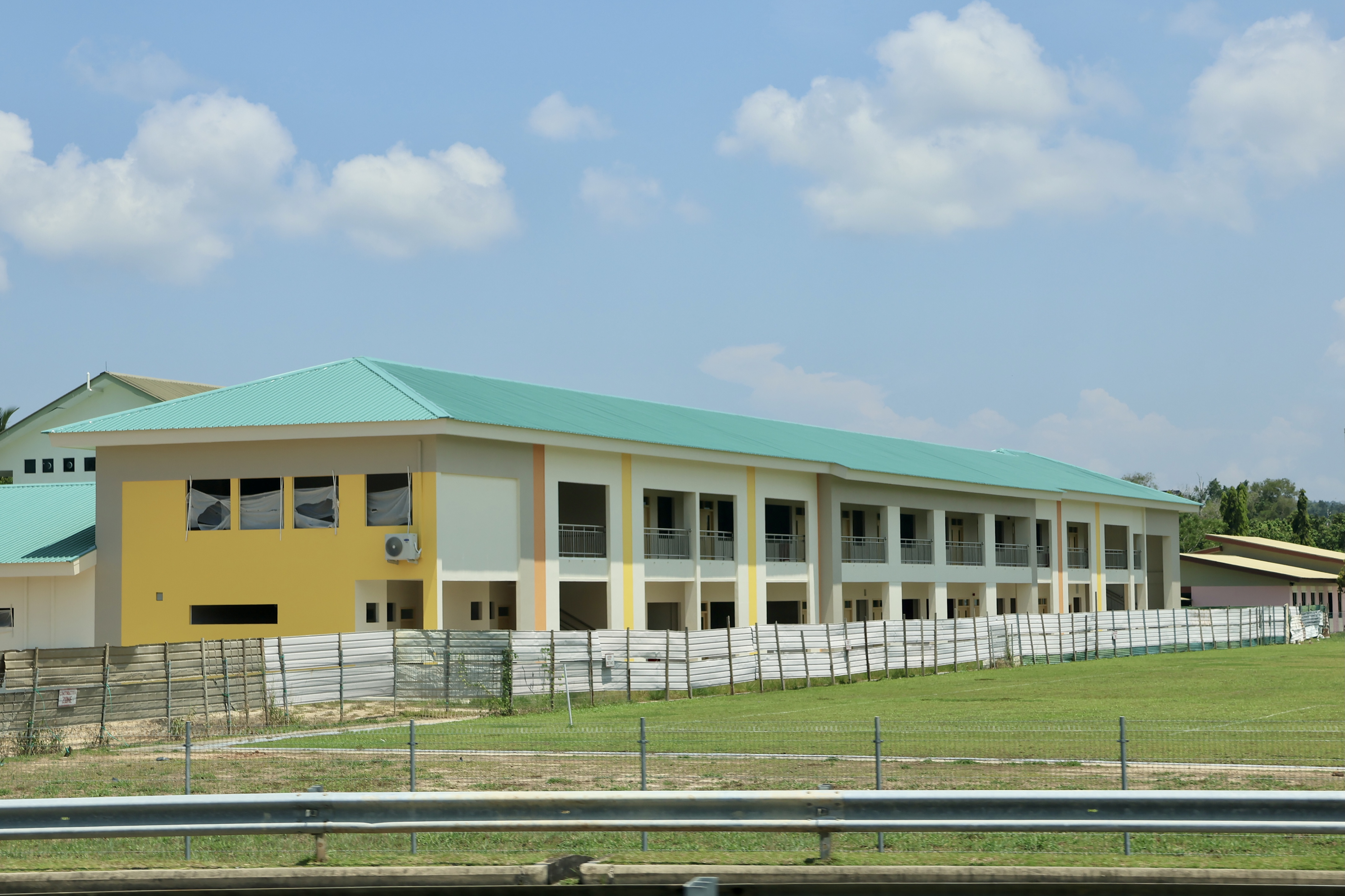
Menglait Secondary School undergoing extension

The eleventh national development plan, which has as its theme "Increased Non-Oil and Gas Sector Output as Catalysts for Economic Growth," further unifies developmental efforts in the non-oil and gas sector's production. With a $3.5 billion budget, it sought to stimulate economic growth by increasing the output of the non-oil and gas sector. Six strategic development pushes were the primary objectives of the plan:

- Raising the standard of education and training to generate highly qualified and educated human capital
- Growing the labor force to meet industry demands
- Creating visionary and balanced (Wasatiah) communities
- Enhancing the sustainable welfare of the populace
- Raising the output and GDP contribution of the non-oil and gas sector
- Fortifying government governance to foster a business-friendly environment

RKN 11 has been delayed to the fiscal year 2023–2024 so that ministries may finish off ongoing projects and get ready for RKN 12. A $500 million budget has been set out for 211 projects, including 28 new ones, for the fiscal year 2023–2024. On 27 March 2023, at the 19th Legislative Council (LegCo) session, this was announced. $31.3 million is set aside for planning, $14.7 million for final payments, $82.1 million for projects during bidding, $368.1 million for ongoing projects, and $3.8 million in reserve were all included in the budget. With an emphasis on industries including agrifood and development, the new initiatives were anticipated to increase GDP, promote digital transformation, and generate employment locally. As part of a larger $52.8 million plan, an additional $596,000 was set aside for disaster risk reduction, supplementing the $25 million previously set aside for handling natural disasters like floods and landslides.

To improve public welfare via the provision of secure, high-quality, and reasonably priced housing, the Ministry of Development (MoD) focus on overseeing and carrying out housing projects and fundamental infrastructure in compliance with current regulations. In 2023, the ministry set aside $3,066,320 for asset and estate management. Two housing projects under the RKN 11 are currently under construction: RPN Tanah Jambu Phase, which aims to build 7,950 terrace houses by January 2025, and Lugu Phase 2, which was expected to complete 1,000 terrace houses this year despite a seven-month delay caused by the COVID-19 pandemic in Brunei. Along with 270 of the 300 units in Lambak Kanan, 140 terrace houses in Rimba were finished in September 2022 and distributed to qualified applicants in 2023.

Noteworthy infrastructure projects including the Sultan Haji Omar Ali Saifuddien Bridge, improvements to Jalan Perindustrian Serasa, Kampong Lumut Drainage Scheme, and the Muara–Tutong Highway flyover at Kampong Lugu are among the significant completed projects. Current efforts include Schools Extension Building Project (Menglait Secondary School, UNISSA and the School of Applied Science and Mathematics in UTB Phase 4), and improving agriculture through programs for raising livestock and rice farming. 75 projects were being carried out as of March 2023, while 91 were in the planning or design stages. Notable budget commitments include $6 million for rice production in Kandol, $4.5 million for livestock development, and $1.9 million for the Government Data Center and Cloud Infrastructure project. Eleven projects have been canceled or refinanced. $19.8 million for educational infrastructure (Politeknik Brunei site in Ikas Bandung and the projected UNISSA campus in Temburong), while an additional $3.4 million committed to BruHIMS functionalities.

On 21 March 2024, during its 20th session, the LegCo adopted a $6.25 billion budget for the fiscal year 2024–2025. The RKN Executive Committee has approved 305 projects worth $4 billion to be finished by 2030. It also detailed the advancement of RKN 11, pointing out that 153 projects would be undertaken under RKN 12 and 54 projects have already been finished. The second phase of commercial rice farming in Kandol ($6 million of a $36 million budget), the renovation of Sultan Hassan Secondary School, the expansion of Menglait Secondary School, the electrical projects for the Gadong market area, and the building of a flyover at the intersection of the Muara–Tutong Highway and Kampong Lugu are some of the major initiatives. In addition, there are plans to construct the Jubli Perak Sengkurong Health Centre, renovate the Hassanal Bolkiah National Stadium, replace water pipes, and carry out digital transformation initiatives for the National Welfare System (SKN) and the Central Account Password Privilege Management Platform.

=== RKN 12 ===
RKN 12 places a high priority on building infrastructure, especially in the housing sector, to promote growth in the economy. Numerous construction projects are currently under way, guided by RKN and the Construction Industry Framework 2022–2035 by the Authority for Building Control and Construction Industry (ABCi). Diverse specifications for design are ensured by adopting the Different Abilities Design Guideline, which is in accordance with the United Nations Convention on the Rights of Persons with Disabilities.

The budget for the fiscal year 2024–2025 supports RKN 12 and allots $4 billion for 305 projects till 2030. By tackling long-term socioeconomic goals, RKN 12 seeks to further Wawasan Brunei 2035. $1.7 billion will be granted to 153 projects from RKN 11 and $2.3 billion to 152 new initiatives. Amounts allocated for the 24th and 25th fiscal years total $500 million, with additional expenditures for research, development of industry, and environmental sustainability, as well as national security, education, housing, and infrastructure. To achieve successful execution and high-quality outputs, ministries, non-governmental organisations, and the private sector must collaborate on the expanded project scope.

== See also ==
- History of Brunei
- Economy of Brunei
