= Kota Batu Archaeological Park =

Archaeological park in Brunei

- Taman Arkeologi Kota Batu
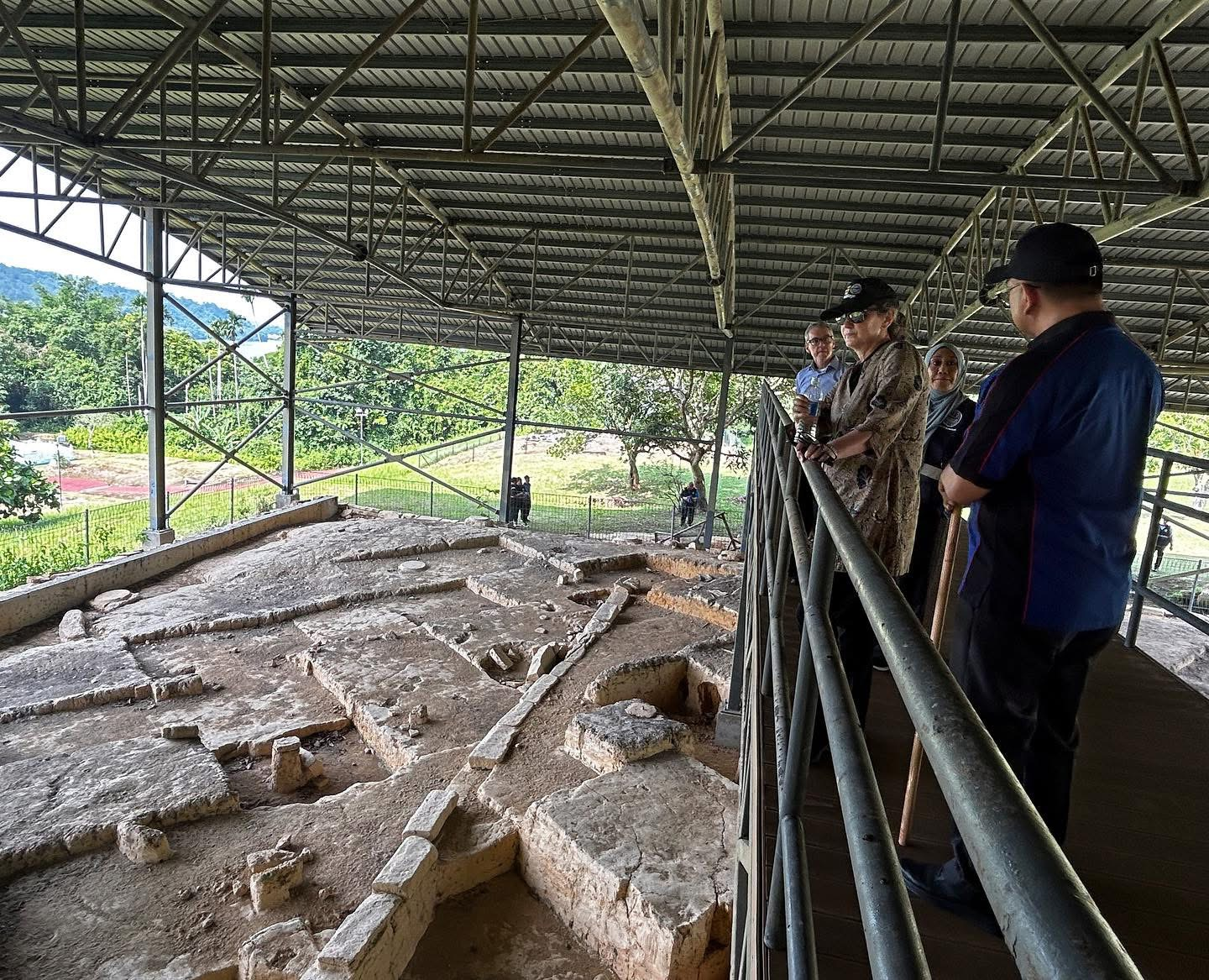
- Caryn McClelland and her delegation's visit to the park in 2023
- Interactive map of Kota Batu Archaeological Park
- 4°52′56″N 114°57′53″E
- Type: Settlement
- Cultures: Bruneian Empire
- Location: Jalan Sultan Bolkiah, Kota Batu, Bandar Seri Begawan, Brunei

Site notes
- Area: 120 acres (49 ha)
- Archaeologists: Tom Harrisson
- Discovered: 1952–1953
- Owner: Museums Department
- Website: www.museums.gov.bn

The Kota Batu Archaeological Park (Malay: Taman Arkeologi Kota Batu) is an archaeological park in Kampong Kota Batu, about 5 kilometres (3.1 mi) from Bandar Seri Begawan, Brunei. The Bruneian government's Museums Department is in charge of overseeing the Kota Batu archeological site and its surrounds, which comprise the mausoleums and the museum area, as they were gazetted under the Antiquities and Treasure Trove Act of 1967, and is regarded as a significant archeological site in Brunei. (Note: The site's archeological significance is demonstrated by the approximately 162,758 objects that have been found there as of 2014.)

From the 14th to the 17th centuries, Kota Batu is said to have been the capital of Brunei, acting as a major hub for settlement, trade, and government. Research on the site's flora and fauna is important, as ethno-archaeological investigations have shown how skilled the locals were at employing plants for construction, industry, medicine, and sustenance. The archaeological park has basic services such rest areas, public restrooms, and parking spaces in addition to a 1,580 metres (5,180 ft) promenade, rest huts, and a bridge connecting to Terindak Island.

== Background ==
Kota Batu, which was originally the capital of the Bruneian Empire, has yielded important insights into the region's historical chronology through archeological discoveries, especially the remains of stone and timber constructions and other items. The wooden buildings discovered along the riverside, for example, could be related to Chinese records from 977 CE that Brunei (Pu-ni) was protected with timber walls before stone walls were added during the reign of Sultan Sharif Ali in the 15th century. The finding of Song dynasty ceramics and Chinese currency lends more credence to the existence of a monarchy in Kota Batu in the 10th century.

One important historical source on early Kota Batu is the Salasilah Raja-Raja Brunei genealogy, which documents the Chinese building of Kota Batu at the time that Sharif Ali moved the government of Brunei to the region. Antonio Pigafetta's 1521 report and the Boxer Codex of 1590, on the other hand, provide more thorough descriptions of Kota Batu's geography, including the Sultan's palace, nobles' homes, and the city's industries. With the exception of the royal palace and a stone castle, Pigafetta saw that the whole city was situated on water. The money factory located on the palace grounds is mentioned in the Boxer Codex. Archaeological investigations surrounding Kota Batu's defensive walls, which housed the palace, industries, and ceramic workshops, have been directed by this information.

== Excavations ==
Tom Harrisson started the excavation work at Kota Batu in 1952–1953, and there were 417 ditches dug out in total. It turned up a lot of historical items from the time before and after the Bruneian Empire was established in the middle of the 14th century. Chinese coins from the Tang, Song, and Ming dynasties from 723 to 1425, and Islamic coins from the 1425–1425 period were among the finds. 'Al-Adil,' the inscription on the Islamic coins, indicated their Islamic provenance, (Note: Since the 1590 Boxer Codex mentioned the presence of a currency mint in Brunei that produced two types of coins, known as Paku and Pitis, with a value ratio of one Paku being equivalent to 32 Pitis, it is possible that these coins were made domestically.) even though they were undated and did not have the issuer's name.

A variety of artefacts were found in addition to the coins, including glass items like buttons, beads, and necklaces; iron and bronze objects; timber implements and old buildings; and stone things including carved stones and piled stone constructions. Along with ceramics from Siam, Indo-China, and Brunei, artefacts from the Ming dynasty, the Song dynasty, and Chinese porcelain were also discovered. These results underscore the historical significance of Brunei as a significant Borneo-northwest commerce centre. Notably in 1521, Pigafetta's report noted that in order to assure high-quality manufacturing, Bruneian pottery was created using clay that had been buried for 50 years. This showcases the highly skilled workmanship of Brunei's ceramics industry, which was vital to daily life in the 16th century.

Kota Batu was the hub of Brunei's early administration, and excavations carried out by the Museums Department throughout the 1960s and 1980s provided fresh perspectives on the area's historical significance. One of the finds was a bridge spanning a river that connected Trindak Island with Kota Batu's higher lands. It was fashioned out of well placed stones. In addition to its defensive role, the causeway shielded Kota Batu from outside dangers. Trindak Island is thought to have functioned as an observation station to keep an eye on ships entering Brunei Bay.

A square stone edifice measuring 25.8 by 25.4 metres (85 ft × 83 ft) with 13 pillar bases set around 3.5 metres apart was discovered during an archaeological excavation in Kota Batu from 1986 to 1997. Based on the finding of a shattered gravestone, initial theories imply that the structure might be a tomb complex; its architecture could also point to a mosque or hall. Based on Ming dynasty pottery shards and gravestone remnants discovered during the excavation, the building's estimated construction date is the 15th century.

The fact that wood and bamboo are commonly used in Malay house architecture, which deteriorates quickly over time, may have contributed to the lack of physical remnants of the royal buildings or the nobles' homes that have been found. However, the sites of coin and pottery factories indicated in historical chronicles like as Pigafetta's report and the Boxer Codex have been identified by archaeologists thanks to the finding of coins and remnants of indigenous pottery in the highlands of Kota Batu. These results imply that the Sultan's palace was situated close to the pieces of coinage. The only palace mentioned in Bruneian oral tradition is Sultan Muhammad Hasan's palace, which is situated on Tanjong Kindana of Berambang Island, in the Brunei River.

== Archaeological park ==
The Archaeological Curator made significant contributions to the park's development during the 8th and 9th National Development Plans (RKN), particularly to the first initiatives spearheaded by Pengiran Karim Osman and his successor, Aminah Majid, aimed at raising public awareness of the site's significance. It received a total of B$1.3 million of the B$2.5 million allotted. Hazair Abdullah gave the park its official opening on 11 August 2015. Senior government officials, members of the Legislative Council, Pengiran Muda Omar Ali, Pengiran Anak Abdul Qudduus, and Adina Othman were also present at the event.

Three primary zones make up the 120 acres (49 ha) park: Zone 1, known as the hill zone, includes cemeteries and graveyards, features a complex with 26 rounded-shaped stones that serve as pillar bases, has its main entrance located on the southern side, and is thought to be the burial site of five aristocrats; Zone 2 consisted of flatlands and the Kota Batu II Complex, located near the Sultan Bolkiah's Mausoleum, featuring archaeological remains of small sandstones arranged in a curved shape; and Zone 3 is the tidal flats, which include commoners' homes. The park features seven huts, a 2.9 kilometres (1.8 mi) promenade, a bridge that connects it to Terindak Island, and an information centre with a collection of artefacts and posters on the archaeological site. Under the direction of archaeology specialists, the park priorities the preservation of historical artefacts while carrying out continuous archeological research.

== See also ==
- List of museums in Brunei
