= Bubungan Dua Belas =

Historic building in Brunei

Coordinates: 4.877612°N 114.951780°E

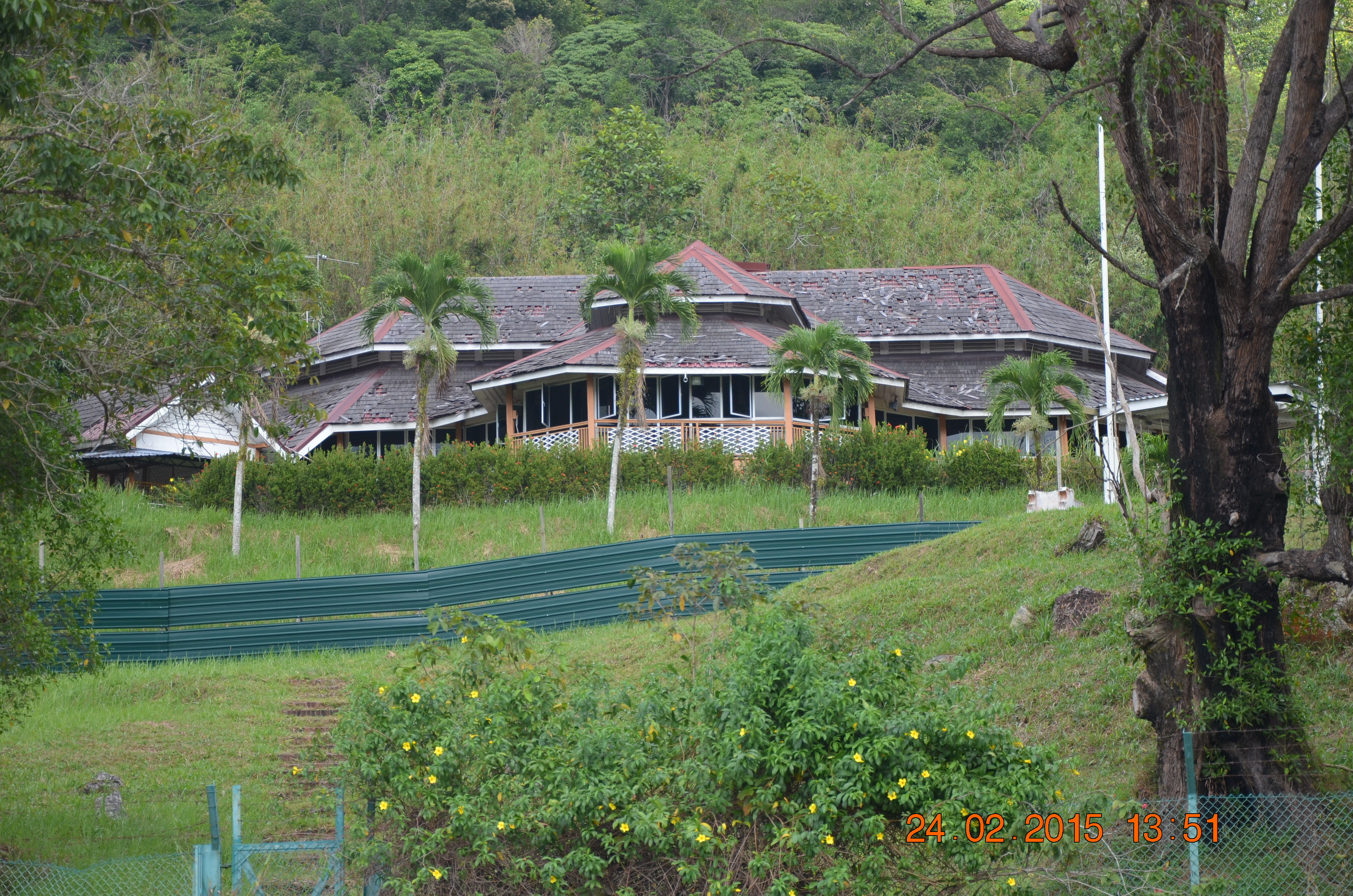
House of Twelve Roofs in 2015

Bubungan Dua Belas (in Malay bubungan (or bum bungan) "roof", dua belas "twelve") or House of Twelve Roofs is located in Jalan Residency, at the foot of Bukit Subok Forest Reserve Recreational Park and about one mile from south of the center of Bandar Seri Begawan, Brunei. It was formerly the official residence of British residents and high commissioners in Brunei and was built in 1906 during the tenure of the first resident Malcolm Stewart Hannibal McArthur. Bubungan Dua Belas exemplifies the fusion of Brunei Malay architectural elements with Western influences, a transformation that was also shaped by the shift to on land living during the Residency period in Brunei. It is one of the oldest surviving buildings in Bandar Seri Begawan. It served as a gallery that exhibits the long-standing relationship between the sultanate and the United Kingdom. The museum is currently closed for renovations.

== History ==
The first house at the site of Bubungan dua belas was built by in 1856 by British Consul General in Brunei Spenser St. John during reign of Sultan Abdul Momin. This was a temporary "leaf house" that was replaced in 1858 with a permanent building. That house fell into disrepair following St John's departure to Haiti and by 1907 had become a jungle-eaten ruin.

In 1874, Inche Mohamed, a Malacca-born British citizen, was appointed as the Consul Agent and in 1883, he had built on water over the Brunei River an official residence which became the new consulate and later courthouse on an additional piece of land awarded by the Sultan near the river. That house was commemorated during 100th anniversary of Bubungan Dua Belas on a $1 stamp issued by the Brunei Postal Services Department. This structure was demolished around 1940.

In December 1905, Sultan Hashim Jalilul Alam Aqamaddin allowed for a British Resident to be stationed in Brunei. McArthur was appointed British Resident and in 1906 he had decided to build a new consulate on exactly the same spot as the former house of St John. The wooden Bubungan Dua Belas or the House of Twelve Roofs was completed by July 1907. The house served as a residence of a total of 25 British Residents and High Commissioners.

== Renovations ==
The building was restored due to its historical and architectural significance by a joint project by Brunei and the United Kingdom in 1998. Queen Elizabeth II took part at the opening of the building as an exhibition in April the same year. The building was renovated in 2007. In 2015, reportedly the museum was closed for renovations, which were complete in 2022.

== See also ==
- List of museums in Brunei
