= Kampong Ayer Cultural and Tourism Gallery =

Museum in Bandar Seri Begawan, Brunei

- Galeri Kebudayaan dan Pelancongan Kampong Ayer
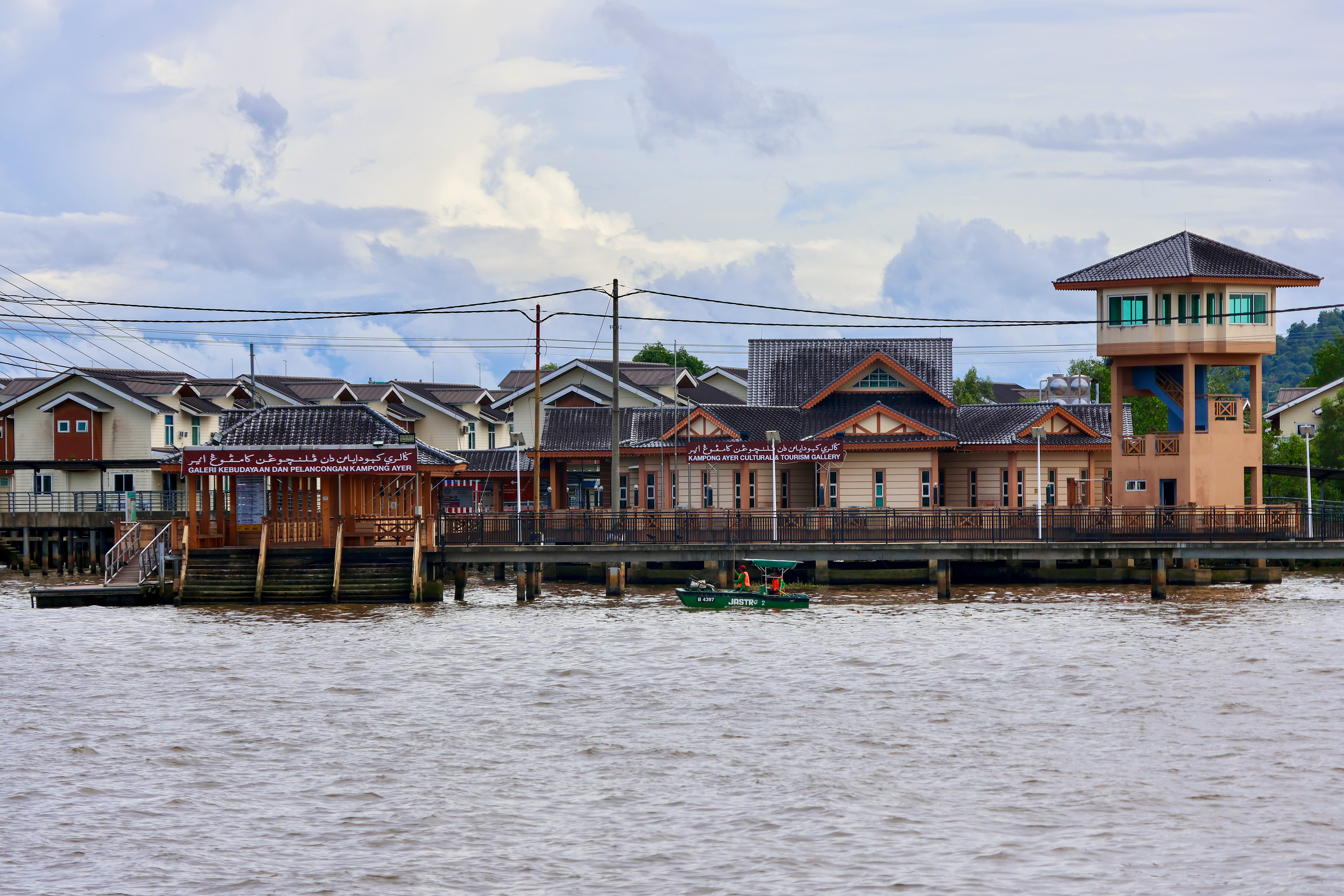
- The gallery in 2026
- Established: 19 August 2009
- Location: Kampong Ayer, Bandar Seri Begawan, Brunei
- Coordinates: 4.8841868°N 114.9444325°E
- Type: Cultural and historical museum
- Collections: Artefacts, traditional tools and clothing, and art
- Founder: Al-Muhtadee Billah
- Owner: Tourism Development Department
- Website: www.tourism.gov.bn

The Kampong Ayer Cultural and Tourism Gallery (KACTG; Malay: Galeri Kebudayaan dan Pelancongan Kampong Ayer) is a museum in Kampong Ayer of Bandar Seri Begawan, Brunei. The gallery features exhibits on its handcrafted goods, including ceramics, woodworking, and weaving.

== Location ==
Situated in Kampung Lorong Sikuna, the KACTG occupies 565 square feet (52.5 m^{2}). Therefore, taking a water taxi from the Dermaga Diraja Bandar Seri Begawan to Jetty 1, is the main means of transportation to the gallery.

== History ==
Building construction on KACTG in Kampung Lorong Sikuna began in August 2007 and was completed in June 2009, under the 2007–2012 National Development Plan. Crown Prince Al-Muhtadee Billah officially launched the gallery on 19 August 2009, after it was constructed at an estimated cost of B$3 million. Yahya Bakar highlighted Kampong Ayer as a "must-see" tourist destination in his address, emphasising the gallery's goals of preserving the water village's legacy, reviving cottage businesses, generating employment, and assisting Brunei's economic diversification through tourism.

== Exhibit and galleries ==
The KACTG has an observation tower with expansive views of the surroundings, and it is modelled after a traditional Malay house in Kampong Ayer. Inside, the exhibition has five sections featuring images and artefacts provided by the Museums Department that describe Kampong Ayer's history, customs, and society. A touch screen display offers further details on nearby sites, while a central hexagonal stage showcases traditional Bruneian brocade weaving skills. The gallery, which honours the settlements legacy, has grown to become a landmark in Bandar Seri Begawan.

With displays that span activities from the 10th century to the present, the gallery provides visitors with insights into the evolution, history, and customs of Kampong Ayer. In order to help maintain and preserve the settlement's legacy, the KACTG also acts as a center for promoting regional handicrafts, offering in-person demonstrations, and offering assistance to local business owners.

== Events and activities ==
Temporary exhibitions and events were held at the gallery, such as the "Kampong Ayer Walking Trail" in 2019, Green Horizons: "Sustain and Change" Art Exhibition and "Tourism and Sustainable Investments" Exhibition in 2023, and "Warisan Bruneiku" Exhibition in 2024.

The Tourism Development Department created a walking trail that begins at the gallery and goes through five villages: Kampong Lurong Sikuna, Kampong Setia 'A', Kampong Tamoi Ujung, Kampong Peramu, and Kampong Bakut Berumput. The trail's goal is to promote locally produced goods and services. The settlement's history, customs, and artwork are displayed in the gallery.

== Gallery ==
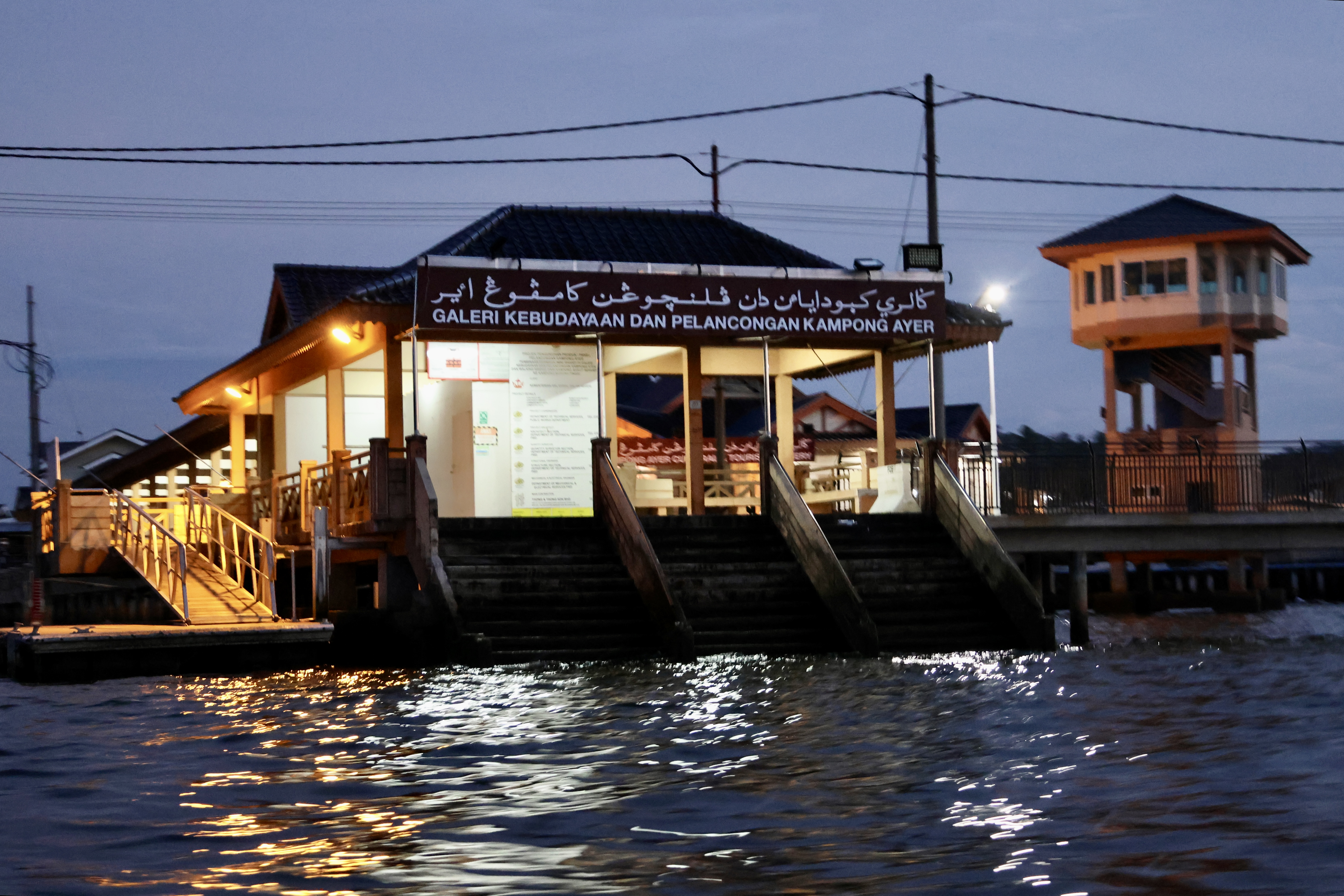
The gallery at dusk

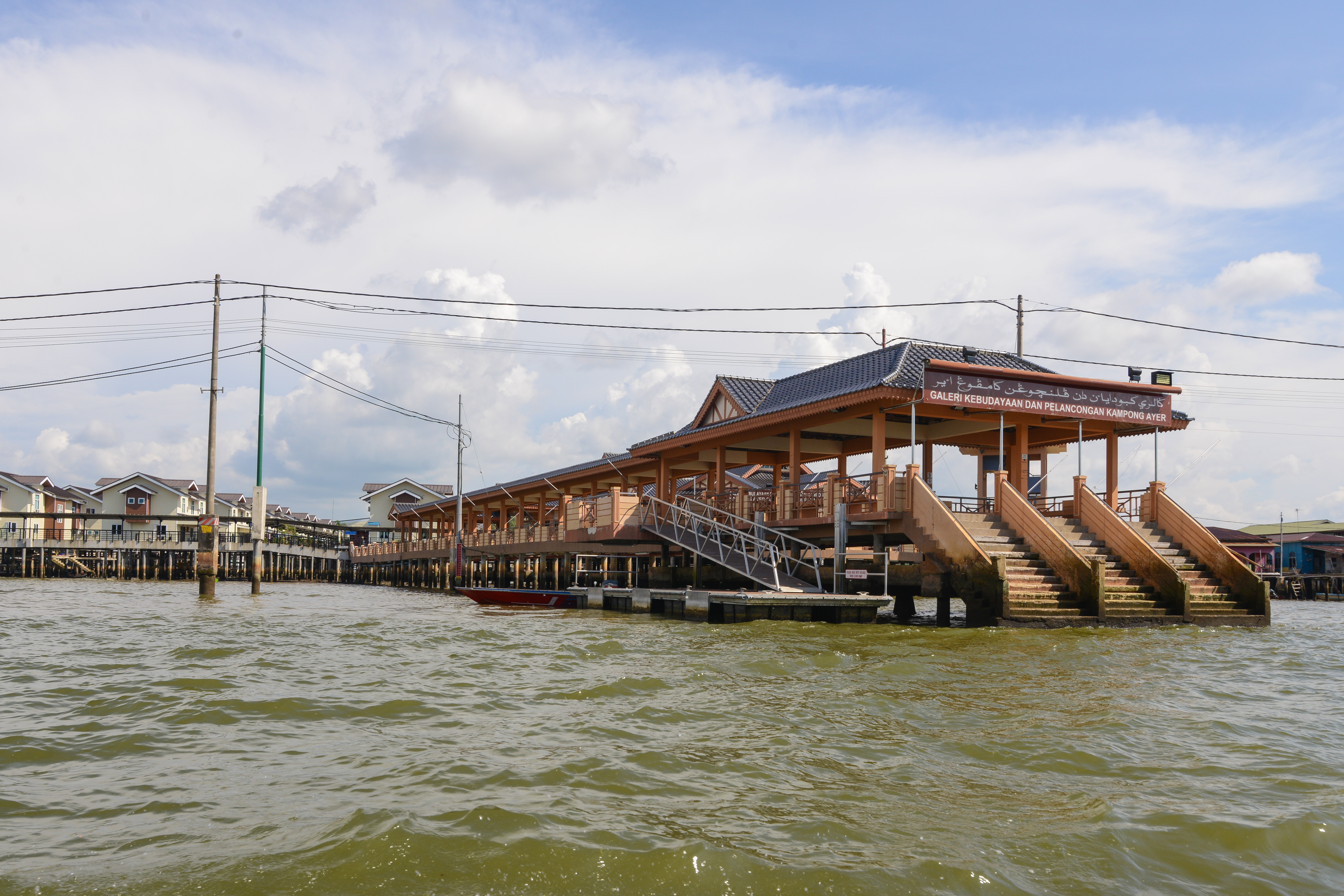
The gallery's main jetty

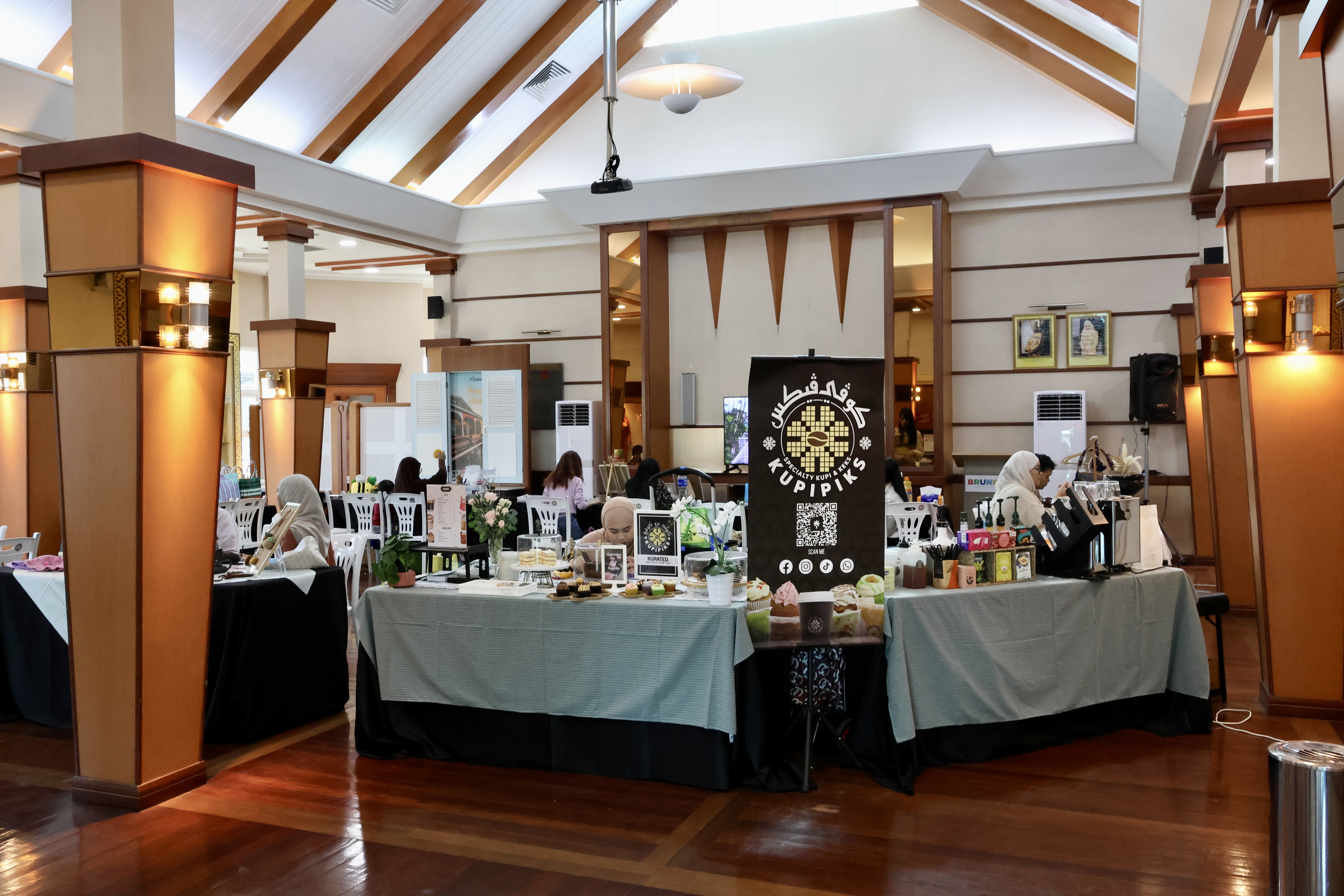
The interior of the gallery

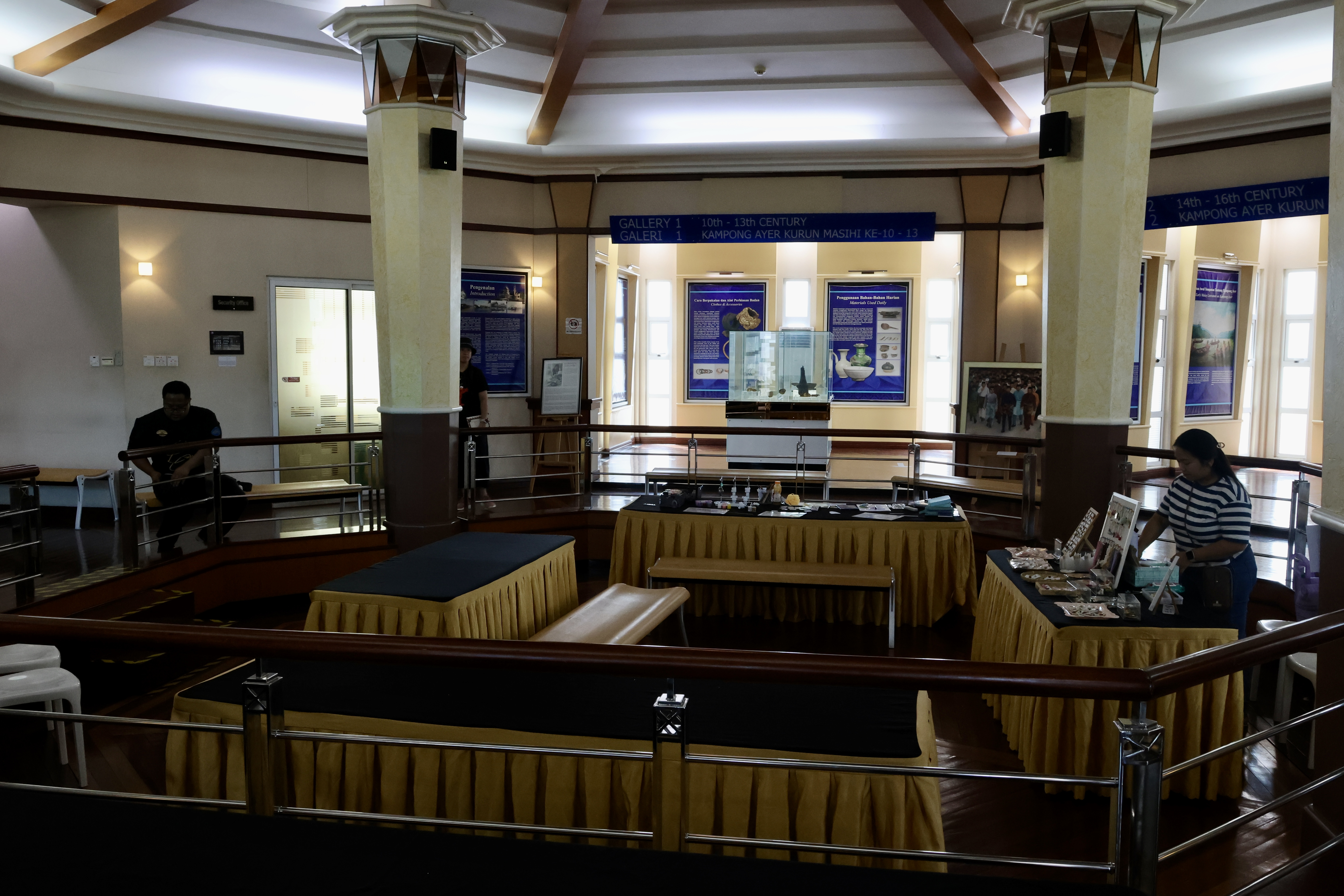
The Sunken Gallery

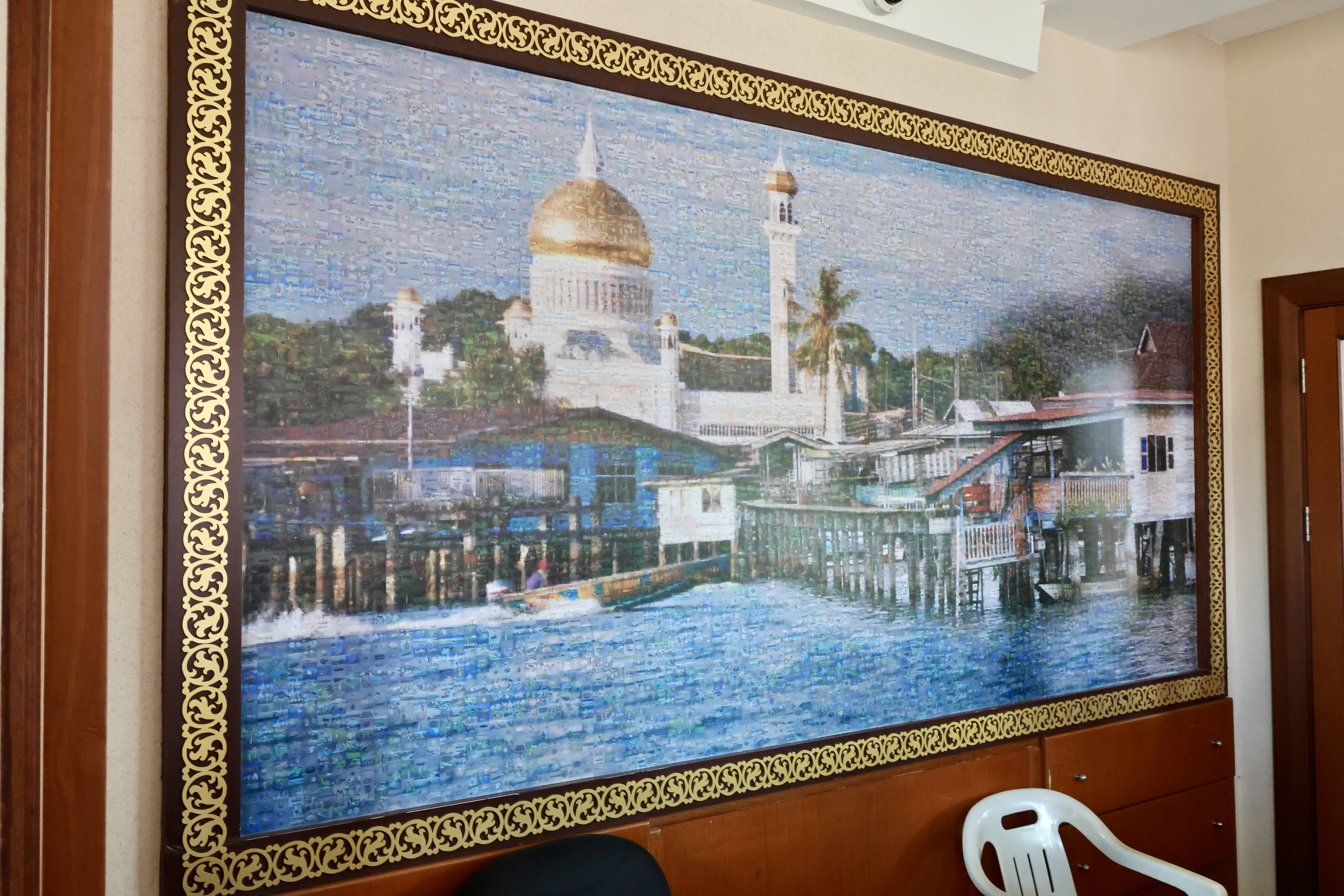
An artwork on display

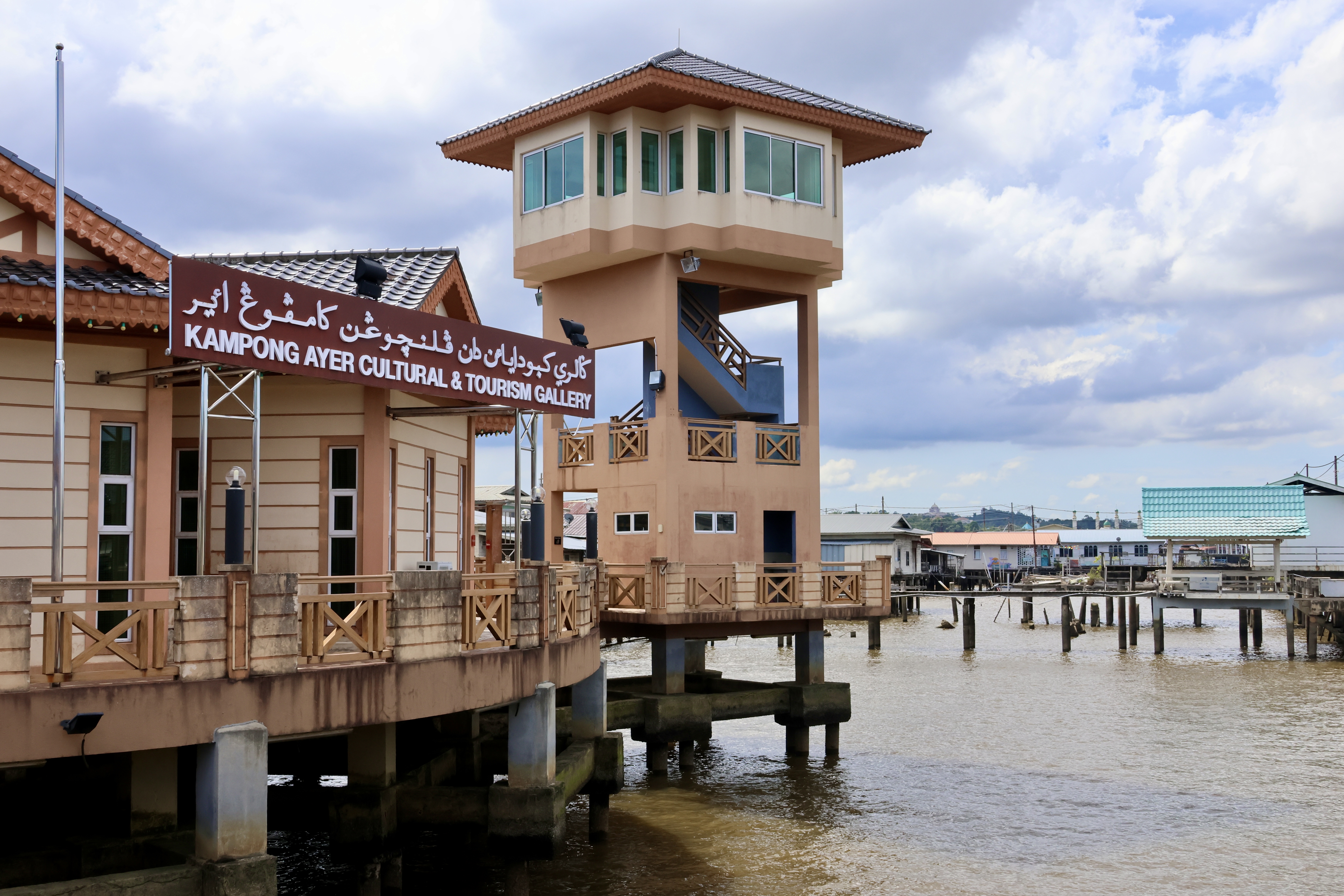
The gallery's observation tower

== See also ==
- List of museums in Brunei
