= Kampong Jaya Bakti =

- Village
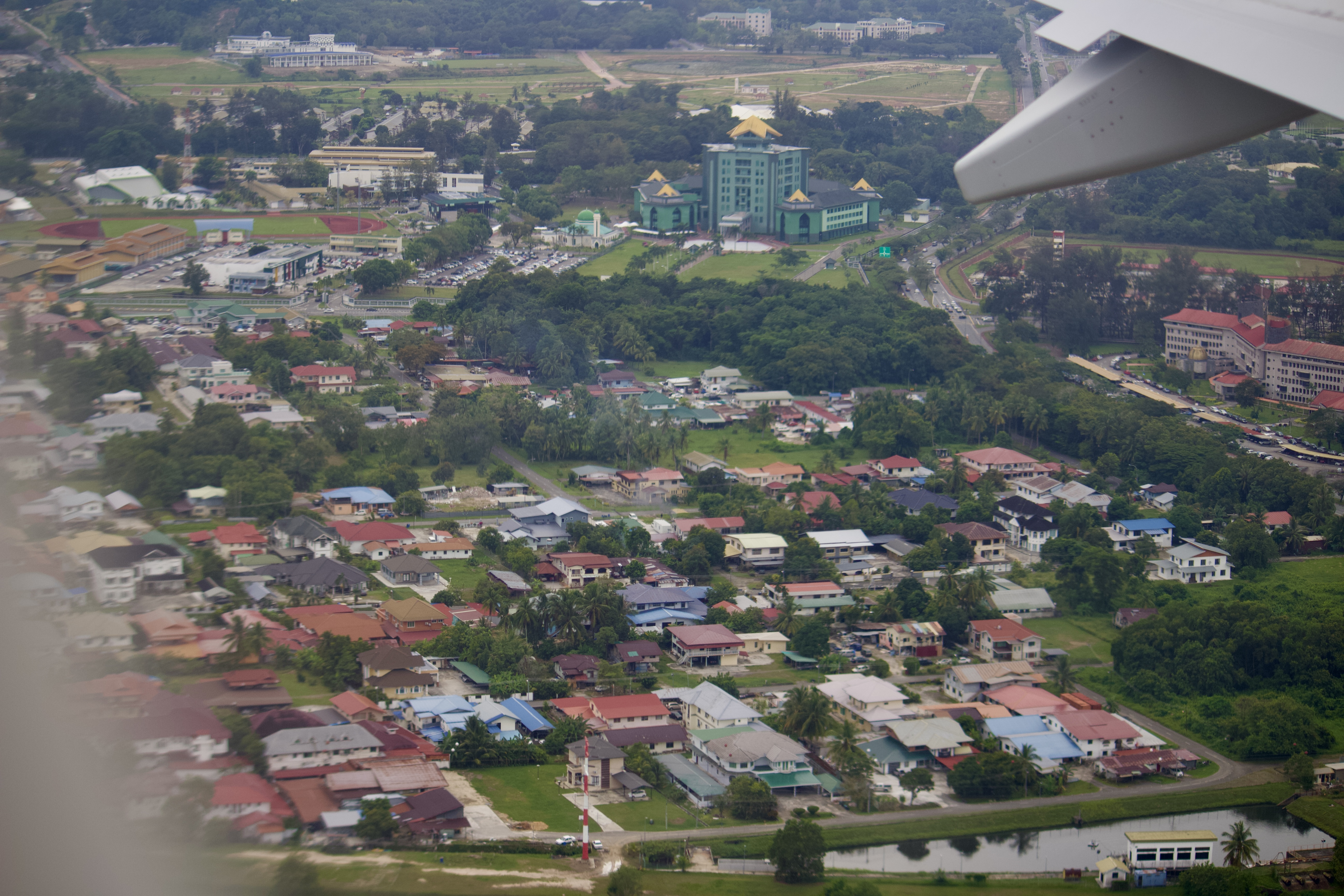
- Located above Kampong Burong Pingai Berakas

- Location in Brunei
- Coordinates: 4°55′45″N 114°55′54″E
- Country: Brunei
- District: Brunei-Muara
- Mukim: Seri Begawan

Population (2016)
  - Total: 468
- Time zone: UTC+8 (BNT)
- Postcode: BB3113

Kampong Jaya Bakti is a village in Brunei-Muara District, Brunei, and a neighbourhood in the capital Bandar Seri Begawan. The population was 468 in 2016. It is one of the villages within Mukim Berakas 'A'. The postcode is BB3113.

== History ==
Pengiran Haji Damit bin Pengiran Ahmad explained that he moved to Kampong Jaya Bakti in 1966. This area is a residential area reserved for government officials only. The land given is an area of three quarters of an acre to each recipient. Most of the houses built in this village use government loans. According to Haji Metali bin Abdul Razak, the origin of Kampong Jaya Bakti was only from an area of rubber trees. When he first moved in, the government buildings had not yet been developed. However, the government is working on all the facilities such as walling the road. After everything is done, the villagers are called to draw lots to determine the position of the house.

The residents of Kampong Ayer moved to Kampong Jaya Bakti starting on 1 July 1966 in stages. The majority of the village residents are Malays who come from Kampong Ayer, including from Kampong Burong Pingai, Kampong Saba and Kampong Tamoi. Kampong Jaya Bakti is reserved for government employees. Villagers build houses by using their respective government loans. For the residents of Kampong Jaya Setia who do not work, they are provided with a half-acre house and a four-acre rubber island. Four acres of rubber trees were cultivated to pay off the house debt. For villagers who want to add a house, they must make a plan first and be referred to the Housing Transfer Department.

== Economy ==
The Village Consultative Council (MPK) has identified a number of projects that have the potential to become One Village One Product (1K1P), among which are products from coconut, iron/stainless steel carpentry (some youth have undergone a course in stainless steel work in June 2013 ) and fertigation farming. The focus has been on fertigation agriculture where the project site has already been identified, which is the old market site. Some residents consisting of MPK members and youths have already undergone this fertigation farming. On 4 June 2015, alongside other villages in collaboration with the Brunei-Muara District Department and the Prison Department held the 1K1P Sales Expo, and Handicrafts, Agriculture and the Prison Department Exhibition held for four days from 4 to 7 June 2015 in the foyer, Times Square Mall. The expo was organized by Berakas Mukim Consulting 'A'. Various products are featured such as handicrafts, agriculture and dry foods.
