= List of museums in Brunei =

This is a list of museums in Brunei.

- Belait District Museum
- Brunei Darussalam Maritime Museum
- Brunei Energy Hub
- Brunei History Centre
- Brunei Museum
- Bubungan Dua Belas
- Exhibition Gallery of the Islamic Dawah Centre
- Islamic Calligraphy And Art Study Centre
- Kampong Ayer Cultural and Tourism Gallery
- Kota Batu Archaeological Park
- Malay Technology Museum
- Royal Brunei Armed forces Museum
- Police Museum Gallery
- Royal Regalia Museum
- Seria Energy Lab
- Sungai Liang Forestry Museum
- The Sports Gallery

== See also ==
- Lists of museums
- List of archives in Brunei
- List of libraries in Brunei
