= Kampong Burong Pingai Berakas =

- Village
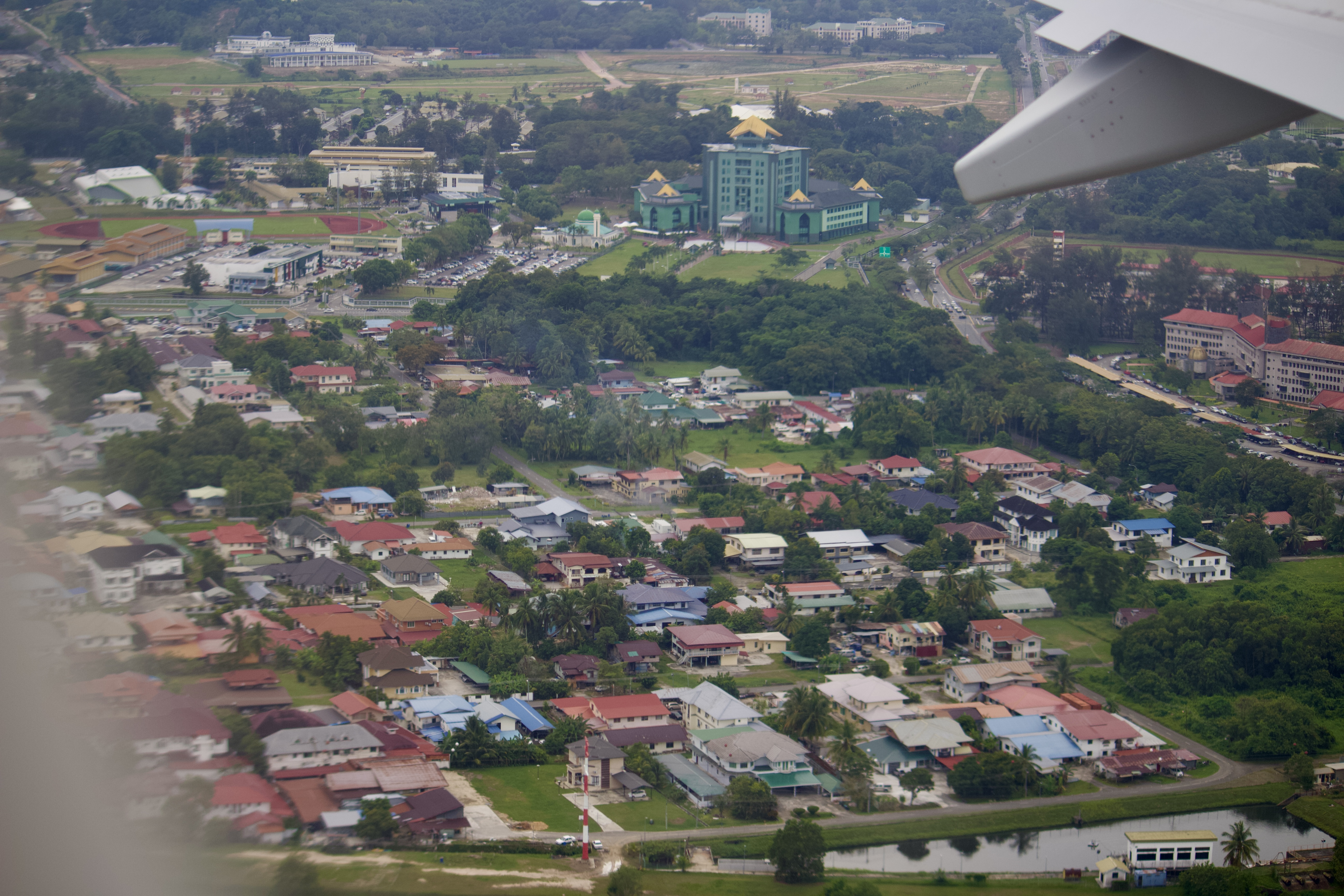
- The village is beside Berakas River

- Location in Brunei
- Coordinates: 4°55′47″N 114°55′41″E
- Country: Brunei
- District: Brunei-Muara
- Mukim: Berakas 'A'

Population (2016)
  - Total: 564
- Time zone: UTC+8 (BNT)
- Postcode: BB3313

Kampong Burong Pingai Berakas is a village in Brunei-Muara District, Brunei, and a neighbourhood in the capital Bandar Seri Begawan. The population was 564 in 2016. It is one of the villages within Mukim Berakas 'A'. The postcode is BB3313.

== History ==
Kampong Burong Pingai Berakas is a continuation of the Bunut Resettlement Village which was inspired by two brothers, namely the late Begawan Mudim Dato Seri Setia Haji Awang Adanan bin Pehin Datu Imam Haji Awang Mokti and the late Haji Awang Mohd. Yusuf bin Pehin Datu Imam Haji Awang Mokti who at that time resided in Kampong Burong Pingai Ayer. The two brothers who are the founders and planners of this move have managed to get a housing site that accommodates 40 families. This housing site is located on the edge of the river which was used as the main means of communication at that time. In this relocation plan, each family is only allocated half an acre and consolation money of BND350 for equipment transportation expenses while the allocation for house construction is the cost of plan participants.

Almost all the residents who participated in this plan are one family from Kampong Burong Pingai Ayer has agreed to keep the village name 'Kampong Birong Pingai' as the name of their new village. Only distinguished by the words 'Ayer' and 'Berakas' only. The first house built in the village was the house of the late Begawan Mudim Dato Seri Setia Awang Adanan. Then in 1953, Tuan Haji Ghafar bin Abdul Hai's house was built in the village.

== Economy ==
The Village Consultative Council (MPK) has identified a number of projects that have the potential to become One Village One Product (1K1P), among which are products from coconut, iron/stainless steel carpentry (some youth have undergone a course in stainless steel work in June 2013 ) and fertigation farming. The focus has been on fertigation agriculture where the project site has already been identified, which is the old market site. Some residents consisting of MPK members and youths have already undergone this fertigation farming. On 4 June 2015, alongside other villages in collaboration with the Brunei-Muara District Department and the Prison Department held the 1K1P Sales Expo, and Handicrafts, Agriculture and the Prison Department Exhibition held for four days from 4 to 7 June 2015 in the foyer, Times Square Mall. The expo was organized by Berakas Mukim Consulting 'A'. Various products are featured such as handicrafts, agriculture and dry foods.
