= Municipalities of Brunei =

Municipalities in Brunei are settlements which have been incorporated by the government to run as municipalities. They are independent from the hierarchy of the country's subdivisions but nevertheless overlap with mukims and villages, the second- and third-level administrative divisions of Brunei. The governing body of a municipality is municipal department (Malay: jabatan bandaran) which is a government department under the Ministry of Home Affairs; the head is a chairman (Malay: pengerusi, officially Pengerusi Lembaga Bandaran) which is equivalent to mayor.

== List ==
There are four settlements in Brunei which have municipal status, namely Bandar Seri Begawan, the capital of Brunei; Kuala Belait, a town and capital of Belait District; Seria, a town also in Belait District; and Tutong, the town of Tutong District. Although Muara in Brunei-Muara District and Bangar, the capital of Temburong District, are officially known in Malay as Pekan Muara and Pekan Bangar (literally 'Muara Town' and 'Bangar Town'), they do not have municipal status but instead administered as village-level subdivisions.

List of municipalities in Brunei
Name	Type of settlement	Governing body	Subdivisions under municipal jurisdiction	
Name	Type of settlement	Governing body	Mukim	Village
Bandar Seri Begawan	city, capital of Brunei	Bandar Seri Begawan Municipal Department	Berakas 'A'	Anggerek Desa; Burong Pingai Berakas; Jaya Bakti; Jaya Setia; Orang Kaya Besar Imas; Pancha Delima; Pengiran Siraja Muda Delima Satu; Pulaie; Serusop
Bandar Seri Begawan	city, capital of Brunei	Bandar Seri Begawan Municipal Department	Berakas 'B'	Madang; Manggis; Sungai Akar
Bandar Seri Begawan	city, capital of Brunei	Bandar Seri Begawan Municipal Department	Burong Pingai Ayer	Burong Pingai Ayer; Lurong Dalam; Pandai Besi 'A'; Pandai Besi 'B'; Pekan Lama; Pengiran Setia Negara; Sungai Pandan 'A'; Sungai Pandan 'B'
Bandar Seri Begawan	city, capital of Brunei	Bandar Seri Begawan Municipal Department	Gadong 'B'	Beribi; Kiarong; Kiulap; Mata-Mata; Menglait; Pengkalan Gadong
Bandar Seri Begawan	city, capital of Brunei	Bandar Seri Begawan Municipal Department	Kianggeh	Berangan; City Centre; Diplomatic Enclave; Kianggeh; Kumbang Pasang; Parit; Pusar Ulak; Tasek Lama; Tumasek; Tungkadeh
Bandar Seri Begawan	city, capital of Brunei	Bandar Seri Begawan Municipal Department	Kota Batu	Belimbing; Kota Batu; Pelambayan; Pintu Malim; Sungai Lampai
Bandar Seri Begawan	city, capital of Brunei	Bandar Seri Begawan Municipal Department	Peramu	Bakut Berumput; Bakut Siraja Muda 'A'; Bakut Siraja Muda 'B'; Lurong Sikuna; Pekilong Muara; Peramu; Setia Pahlawan
Bandar Seri Begawan	city, capital of Brunei	Bandar Seri Begawan Municipal Department	Saba	Saba Darat 'A'; Saba Darat 'B'; Saba Laut; Saba Tengah; Saba Ujong
Bandar Seri Begawan	city, capital of Brunei	Bandar Seri Begawan Municipal Department	Sungai Kebun	Bolkiah 'A'; Bolkiah 'B'; Setia 'A'; Setia 'B'; Sungai Kebun; Sungai Siamas; Ujong Kelinik
Bandar Seri Begawan	city, capital of Brunei	Bandar Seri Begawan Municipal Department	Tamoi	Pengiran Bendahara Lama; Pengiran Kerma Indera Lama; Pengiran Tajuddin Hitam; Tamoi Tengah; Tamoi Ujong
Kuala Belait	town, capital of Belait District	Kuala Belait and Seria Municipal Department	Kuala Belait	Kuala Belait; Pandan 'A'; Pandan 'B'; Pandan 'C'; Mumong 'A'; parts of Mumong 'B'
Seria	town	Kuala Belait and Seria Municipal Department	Seria	parts of Seria Area 1; parts of Seria Area 2
Tutong	town, capital of Tutong District	Tutong Municipal Department	Pekan Tutong	parts of Petani; parts of Bukit Bendera

== See also ==
- Administrative divisions of Brunei
