= Kampong Bolkiah =

Neighbourhood in Kampong Ayer, Brunei

Bolkiah Kampung Bolkiah
- Village and housing estate
- Kampong Bolkiah
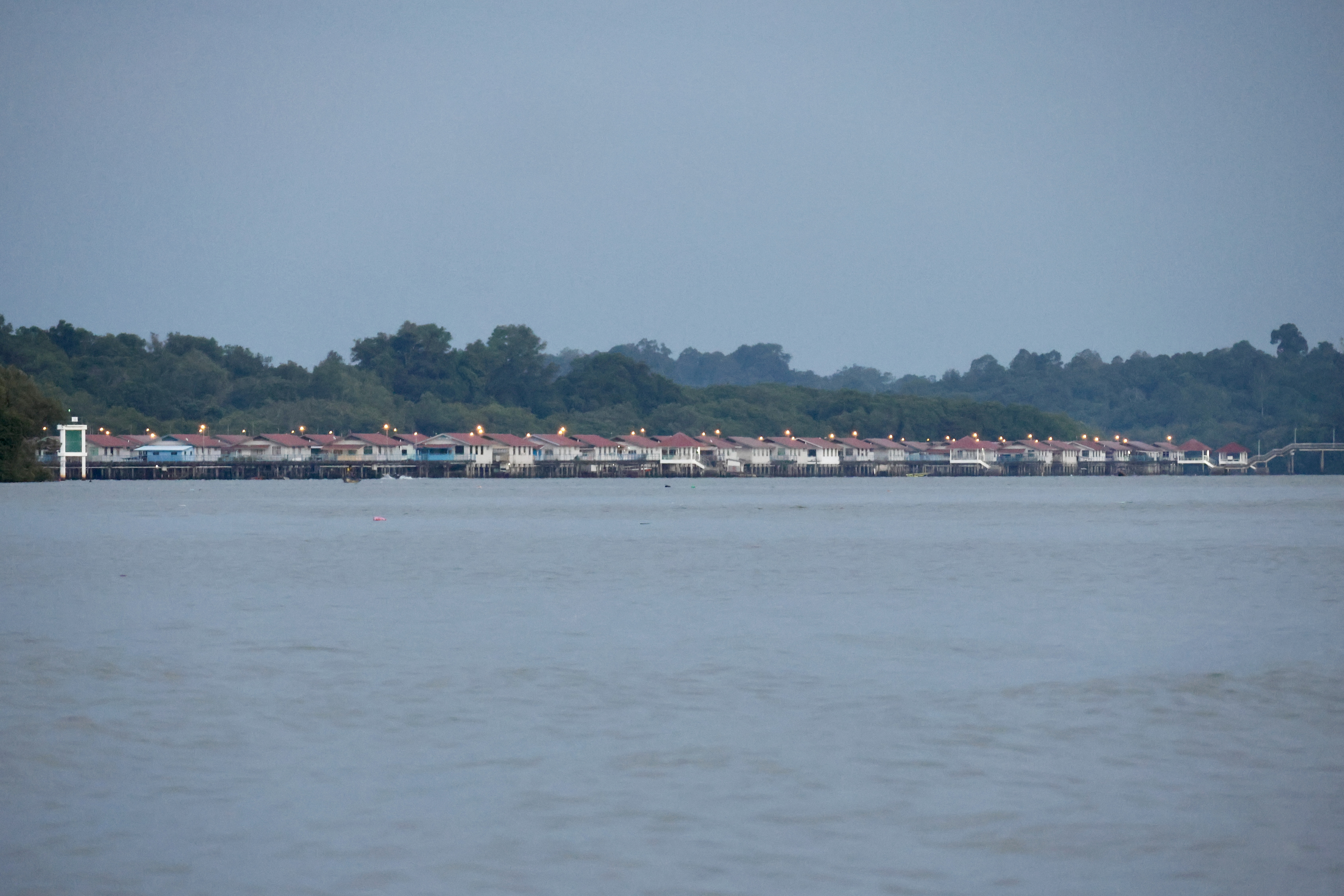
- Kampong Bolkiah 'B'

- Location in Brunei
- Coordinates: 4°51′25″N 114°57′25″E
- Country: Brunei
- District: Brunei-Muara
- Mukim: Sungai Kebun
- Inhabited: 1980s
- Established: 5 October 1992
- Inaugurated: 22 August 1994

Population (2016) (Note: See Administration section.)
  - Total: 2,143
- Time zone: UTC+8 (BNT)
- Postcodes: BK1125, BK1325

Kampong Bolkiah (Note: From the Malay name, lit. "Bolkiah Village") is a village and housing estate in Kampong Ayer, the traditional riverine settlement in Bandar Seri Begawan, the capital of Brunei. The total population was 2,143 in 2016.

== History ==
Prior to the early 1980s, the area of what is now Kampong Bolkiah was still uninhabited. A few houses had been built in the area as of 1985; in 1994, it was reported that there were 48 houses and they were part of the existing village Kampong Buang Sakar which was administered under the village head of Kampong Kasat.

Kampong Bolkiah was established on 5 October 1992 by the Sultan Haji Hassanal Bolkiah Foundation (Note: Malay: Yayasan Sultan Haji Hassanal Bolkiah) as a housing scheme to accommodate the residents from the villages of Kampong Setia Pahlawan, Kampong Peramu, Kampong Saba, Kampong Petagian, Kampong Kota Batu and Kampong Sungai Matan who had lost homes due to events of fire. The construction of the houses began in 1993 and completed in the following year. It was inaugurated on 22 August 1994 by Sultan Hassanal Bolkiah.

The second phase of the housing scheme involved the construction of another 250 homes. It was built to accommodate another group of residents who had lost their homes to fires in 1993. The second phase eventually becomes the administrative village Kampong Bolkiah 'B'.

== Administration ==
For subdivision purposes Kampong Bolkiah has been divided into, and established as, two administrative villages:

Village	Population (2016)	Postcode
Kampong Bolkiah 'A'	1,000	BK1125
Kampong Bolkiah 'B'	1,143	BK1325
Total	2,143	-

Both villages are under Mukim Sungai Kebun, a mukim in Brunei-Muara District. They have also been subsumed under the municipal area of Bandar Seri Begawan.

== Infrastructures ==
Yayasan Sultan Haji Hassanal Bolkiah 'A' Housing and Kampong Bolkiah 'B' are the names of the structured housing project in Kampong Ayer. There were 476 homes constructed in all, with the first phase consisting of 226 homes in Kampong Bolkiah 'A' and the second phase consisting of 250 homes in Kampong Bolkiah 'B'. Type 'A' houses, which had two bedrooms, and Type 'B' houses, which had four bedrooms, were built. Just 26 of the total are Type 'A' houses.

Kampong Bolkiah Religious School (Note: Malay: Sekolah Ugama Kampung Bolkiah) is the village's sekolah ugama i.e. school for the country's Islamic religious primary education. It was established in 1999. The school complex occupies seven of the houses, out of which six for classrooms and one for administration office. Prior to its establishment, the local students go to the religious schools in the neighbouring villages. (Note: The schools were Begawan Pehin Udana Khatib Haji Awang Umar Religious School in Kampong Setia, Raja Isteri Pengiran Anak Saleha Religious School in Kampong Saba, Al-Muhtadee Billah Religious School in Kampong Lurong Dalam, and Pintu Malim Religious School in Kampong Pintu Malim.)

The village has a health clinic which has been in operation since 2003.

There is a mini local library inside the branch office of the Sultan Haji Hassanal Bolkiah Foundation located in the village.

A community centre for the local youths was established in 2021; it occupies a former house which has been donated for the purpose.

Yayasan Sultan Haji Hassanal Bolkiah Mosque is the village mosque.
