= Awang Semaun Secondary School =

Secondary school in Kampong Ayer, Brunei

- Sekolah Menengah Awang Semaun

Location
- Jalan Lumapas; Kampong Sungai Kebun; Bandar Seri Begawan, BK2386; Brunei
- Coordinates: 4.877056°N 114.939°E

Information
- Former name: Sungai Kebun English Secondary School
- School type: Government
- Motto: Kecemerlangan Melalui Pendidikan (Excellence Through Education)
- Established: March 1982
- School district: Cluster 1
- Authority: Ministry of Education
- Principal: Mohammad Fadhillah bin Ismail
- Teaching staff: 100
- Grades: Years 7-11
- Gender: Coeducational
- Enrolment: 1000
- Area: 22.5 acres (9.1 ha)
- Colours: Black, blue and green
- Affiliation: CIE, BTEC
- Website: Official Facebook
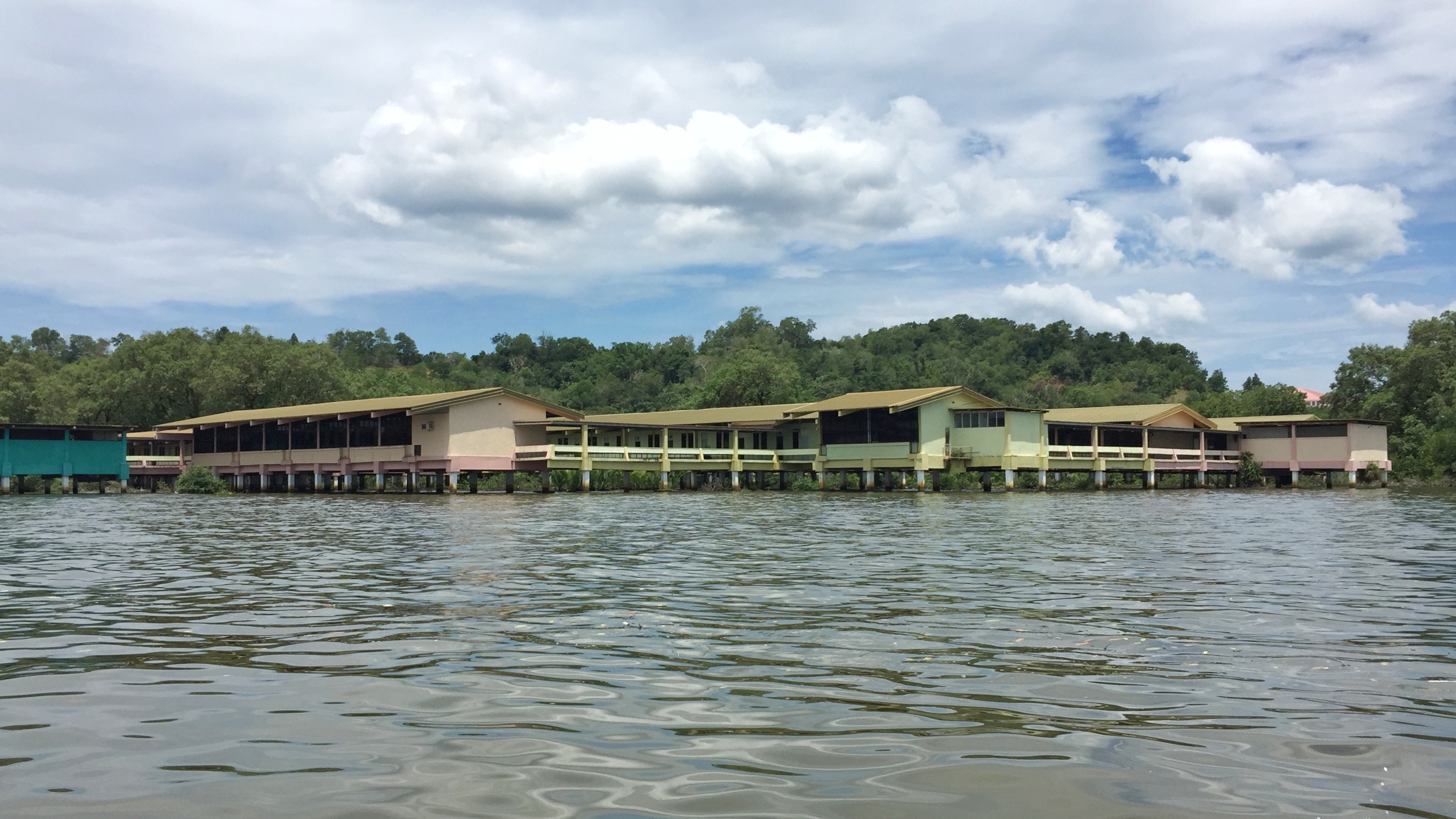
- The campus in 2021

Awang Semaun Secondary School (Malay: Sekolah Menengah Awang Semaun, abbrev: SMAS), is a co-educational government secondary school located in Kampong Sungai Kebun, Brunei.

== Etymology ==
Awang Alak Betatar, who went on to become Sultan Muhammad Shah, the first Sultan of Brunei, is reported to have had a younger brother named Awang Semaun. After his brother was bestowed the traditional Malay title Damong, he went on to become one of the four wazirs as Pengiran Temenggong, who helped the Sultan rule the nation. He is strongly linked to Brunei's population's conversion to Islam.

A legend from Temburong claims that Awang Semaun left behind a gigantic water jar that occasionally materialises momentarily for select individuals. This is in the river, partially submerged, when it appears. But the saying goes that you can only notice it if you are not seeking for it. It is also noted that Awang Semaun abducted a princess from Johor and offers her to his brother, Awang Alak Betatar as a bride. He is also noted to be a resident of Kampong Sungai Kebun.

== History ==
The school was established as Sungai Kebun English Secondary School in March 1982. It was first located at the present Paduka Seri Begawan Sultan Science College before it moved to Kampong Sungai Kebun on 3 February 1983. The relocation of the school was to relieve the overcrowding in a few capital schools, where a portion of the student body was drawn from Kampong Ayer residents. The school was built in phases on a 22.5 acres (9.1 ha) plot of open ground at a cost of B$35 million. On 13 December 1984 marked its official opening by the then Minister of Education, Pehin Dato Abdul Aziz. The occasion was marked by the renaming of the school to its current name.

== Academics ==
At the end of Year 11 (Year 10 for the Express stream), students sit for GCE 'O' Level and/or IGCSE examination. Passing the examination may allow students to proceed to sixth form, in which students could also enroll in BTEC courses. Alternatively, students may also opt for public vocational education at IBTE schools.

== See also ==
- List of secondary schools in Brunei
