= Kampong Ayer =

Traditional settlement in Bandar Seri Begawan, Brunei

Kampong Ayer Kampung Aing
- Village
- Kampong Ayer is the historic heart of Brunei, where vibrant water-village life thrives gracefully upon the Brunei River.
- Nickname: Venice of the East
- A map showing Kampong Ayer in Brunei.
- Coordinates (Kampong Ayer): 4°52′57″N 114°56′33″E
- Country: Brunei
- District: Brunei–Muara
- Settled: 8th century
- Founded: 14th century
- Mukims: List: Burong Pingai Ayer; Peramu; Saba; Sungai Kebun; Sungai Kedayan; Tamoi

Area
  - Total: 10 km^{2} (3.9 sq mi)

Population (2021) (Note: See Administration section.)
  - Total: 8,902
  - Density: 890/km^{2} (2,300/sq mi)
- Time zone: UTC+8 (BNT)

Local water taxis are waiting for passengers along the banks of the Brunei River near Kampong Ayer, a historic water village in Bandar Seri Begawan, Brunei.

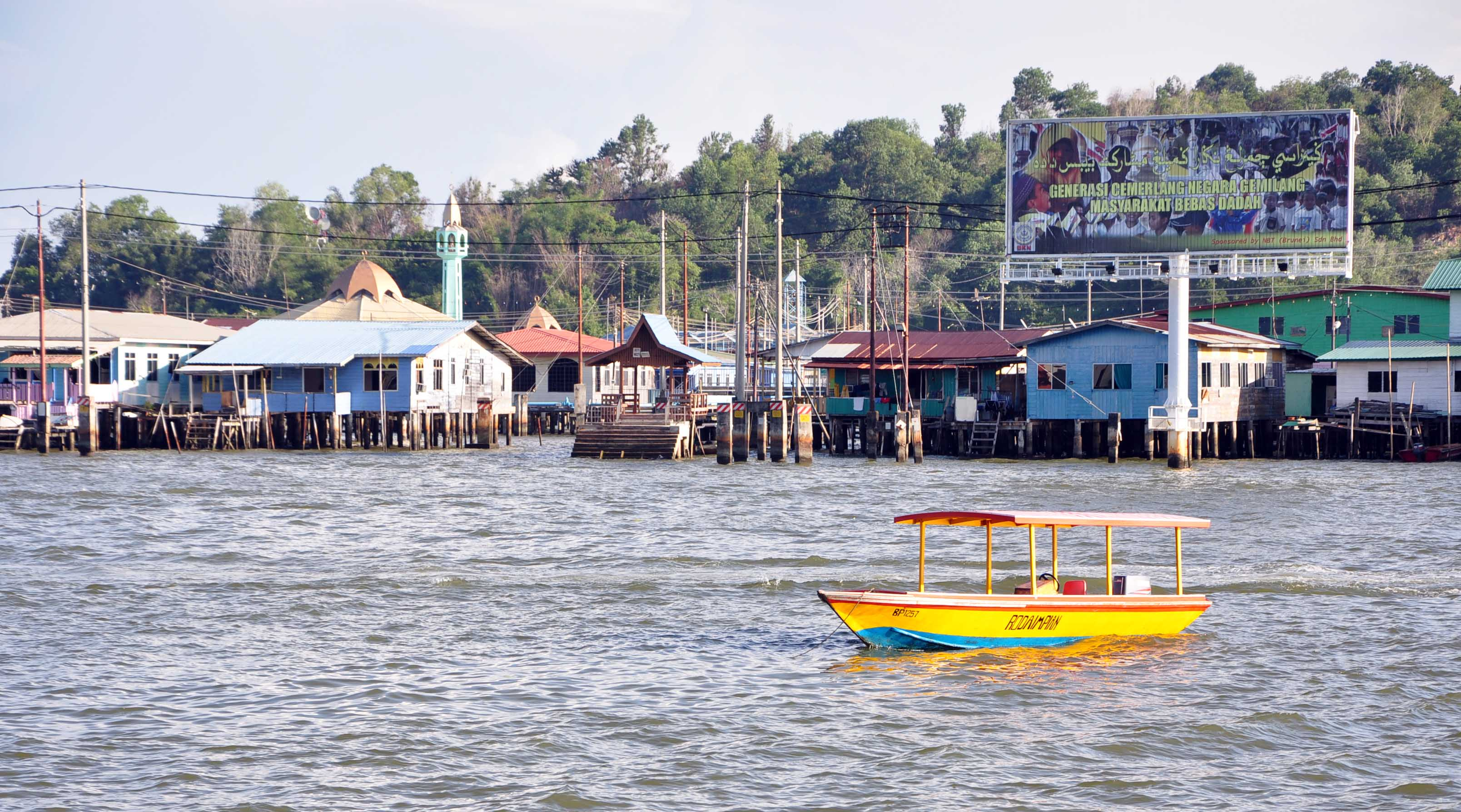
A boat (water taxi) near Kampong Ayer, Brunei, in 2009.

Kampung Ayer (kahm-PONG AH-yuhr, Malay pronunciation: [ˈkampoŋ ˈaje(r)], Brunei: Kampung Aing) is a prominent traditional settlement in Bandar Seri Begawan, the capital of Brunei. It comprises neighbourhoods of traditional houses, schools and mosques built on stilts above the Brunei River near the capital's city centre. It has an area of about 10 square kilometres (3.9 sq mi); the total population was 10,250 in 2016. It has been historically nicknamed 'Venice of the East'.

== Etymology ==
The present name 'Kampung Ayer' is the obsolete Za'aba spelling of the Malay term 'Kampung Air', which literally means 'Water Village'. However, despite the Za'aba spelling being tailored for Johor–Riau pronunciation, therefore clearly not native to Brunei; the old spelling version is retained and still used as its primary name. In Brunei Malay, this place is also known as Kampung Aing. There are more examples of "Malaysian-influenced" spellings imposed on Bruneian placenames: Temburong for native Tamburung, Jerudong for Jarudung, and Kianggeh for Kianggih.

In general, village names are based on a number of themes, including the title of the state dignitaries who resided there, the area's specialty trade, the location of the village, or the site of a notable event or celebration. Examples of names based on nearby locations or rivers include Kampong Sungai Kedayan, Kampong Sungai Asam, Kampong Pekan Lama, Kampong Sungai Pandan, Kampong Lurong Dalam, Kampong Lurong Sikuna, Kampong Sungai Si Amas, Kampong Ujong Klinik, Kampong Sungai Kebun, and Kampong Bukit Berumput.

The names of the major state dignitaries or the village chiefs are used to create the designations Kampong Sultan Lama, Kampong Pengiran Bendahara Lama, Kampong Pemancha Lama, Kampong Bakut Siraja Muda, Kampong Pengiran Kerma Indera Lama, Kampong Pengiran Tajuddin Hitam, Kampong Setia Negara, Kampong Setia, and Kampon Setia Pahlawan. The villages of Kampong Peramu, Kampong Pekilong Muara, and Kampong Pandai Besi are named after their craftspeople.

Several settlements' names vanished as they were merged into neighboring villages. Kampong Kandang Batu and Kampong Alangan were among them. Several villages have completely vanished. Many villages, including Kampong Saudagar, Kampong Pasir, Kampong Belanak, Kampong Panchur Berasur, Kampong Tekuyong, Kampong Pengiran Daud, Kampong Pengiran Ajak, and Kampong Jawatan Jeludin, were mentioned in writing by an English historian in the middle of the 19th century, but their locations have never been determined.

== History ==
The primary settlement area of the de facto capital of Bruneian Empire at the time, Kampong Ayer, would have existed as early as the 1363–1402 reign of Sultan Muhammad Shah. Brunei exported a wide range of commodities from the settlement, which served as a significant port. The settlement is believed to have been inhabited for several centuries. There are several historical records, particularly foreign sources, which reported the existence of 'water settlements' on the Brunei River. The most well known is arguably the account by Antonio Pigafetta, an Italian explorer, on his visit to Brunei as part of the Magellan expedition in 1521.

Entirely built in salt water... It contains twenty-five thousand hearths (families). The houses are all constructed of wood and built up from the ground on tall pillars.

— Antonio Pigafetta

There is a possibility that the stilt settlement might not have always been where it is today, that Kampong Ayer might have undergone relocation throughout history. Olivier van Noort, a Dutch, on his stay in Brunei from December 1600 to January 1601, describing the houses (of the nobles) as being "made of wood, and built on such light piles that when there is a storm or some other untoward event these houses can be removed from one side of the river to the other."

When Brunei's massive thalassocracy was lost, its finances soured. With a population of barely 15,000, it was hardly a shadow of its former glory by 1840. However, the role also extended into the time from the arrival, and subsequent imperial presence of the British even until the early 20th century. It was only during the British Residency that a programme which encouraged the Kampong Ayer residents to resettle on land began to be introduced, although it was initially unsuccessful but eventually took off, resulting in significant reduction to its population. Nevertheless, substantial number of residents still remain to live on water. The settlement also survived the Allied bombings of World War II.

== Administration ==
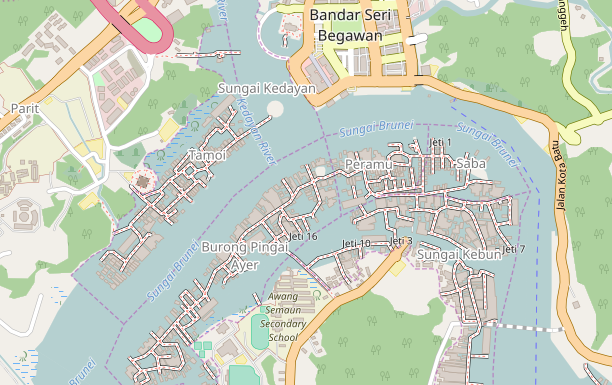
Map of Kampong Ayer from OpenStreetMap

Kampong Ayer encompasses six mukims and several administrative villages:

Mukims and villages of Kampong Ayer
Mukim	Population (2021)	Villages
Burong Pingai Ayer	1,459	Burong Pingai Ayer, Lurong Dalam, Pandai Besi 'A', Pandai Besi 'B', Pekan Lama, Pengiran Setia Negara, Sungai Pandan 'A', Sungai Pandan 'B'
Peramu	1,151	Bakut Berumput, Bakut Pengiran Siraja Muda 'A', Bakut Pengiran Siraja Muda 'B', Lurong Sikuna, Pekilong Muara, Peramu, Setia Pahlawan Lama
Saba	827	Saba Darat 'A', Saba Darat 'B', Saba Laut, Saba Tengah, Saba Ujong
Sungai Kebun	4,282	Bolkiah 'A', Bolkiah 'B', Setia 'A', Setia 'B', Sungai Kebun, Sungai Siamas, Ujong Kelinik
Sungai Kedayan	241	Bukit Salat, Sumbiling Lama, Sungai Kedayan 'A', Sungai Kedayan 'B', Ujong Tanjong
Tamoi	942	Limbongan, Pengiran Bendahara Lama, Pengiran Kerma Indera Lama, Pengiran Tajuddin Hitam, Tamoi Tengah, Tamoi Ujong, Ujong Bukit
Total	8,902	–

The mukims and villages are also part of the municipal area of Bandar Seri Begawan.

== Infrastructure ==
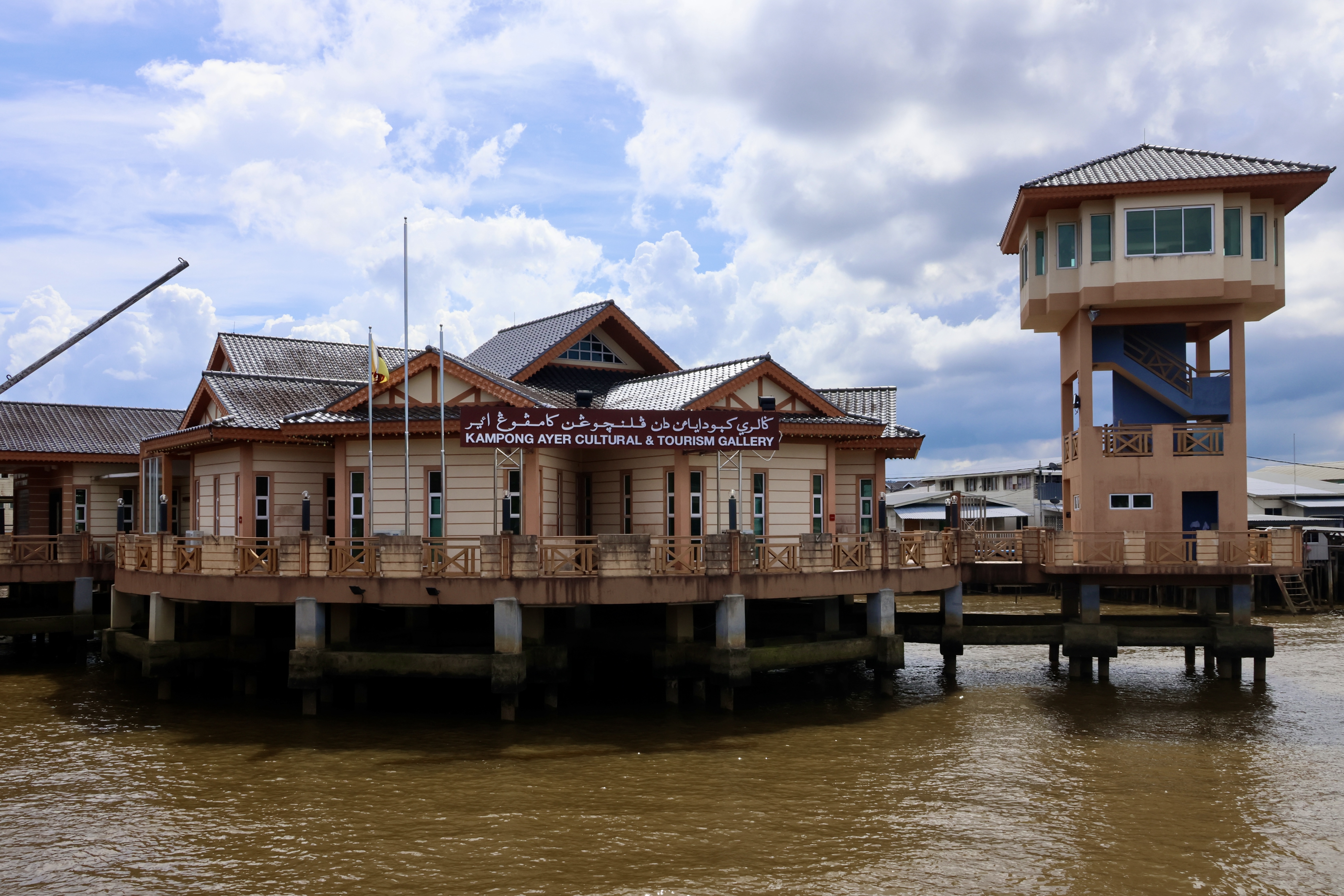
Kampong Ayer Cultural and Tourism Gallery

Houses in Kampong Ayer are built on stilts above the water. They are traditionally made of wood and adopt the style of traditional Malay houses. The houses may be up to two-storey high. Majority are built privately, thus may have individual style, whereas some which have been built under the public housing initiatives (notably those in Kampong Bolkiah and the houses under the pilot rejuvenation project in Kampong Lurong Sikuna) have a more uniform style akin to housing estates on land.

Kampong Ayer has an extensive network of walkways on stilts and pedestrian bridges connecting the houses and other buildings. They are built of wood, concrete or with metal stilts. For neighbourhoods without connecting walkways due to being separated by wide waterways, mobility is done by motorboats. The boats are usually made of wood and in traditional local style, but installed with engines. They are commonly known as perahu tambang (translated as 'water taxis') as trips are charged with fares similar to car taxis.

Common utilities may include electricity, pipe water, telephone lines, internet access and television services. As of 2017, fixed wireless has been made available with the speed of up to 100 Mbps. It has been implemented to eliminate the difficulty of house-to-house installation and overcome frequent internet cable theft.

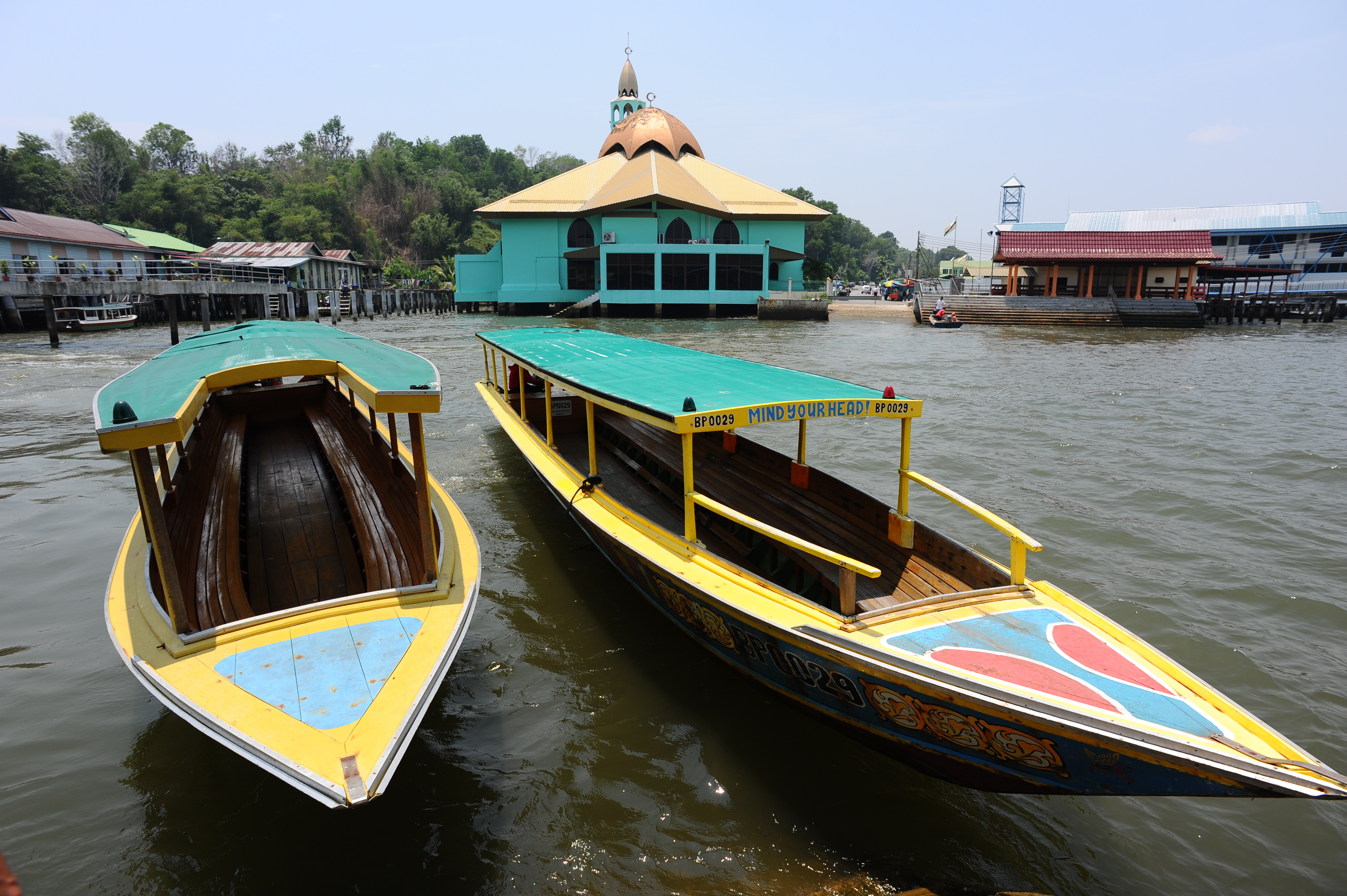
Al-Muhtadee Billah Mosque viewed from a water taxi

Educational institutions are available in Kampong Ayer which provide public education comprising primary, primary religious and secondary. There are at least a primary school in each mukim. Similarly, religious schools can also be found, which provide primary religious education to the resident Muslim pupils. The secondary school in Kampong Ayer, Awang Semaun Secondary School, is the only school of its kind where its buildings are built on water. Nevertheless, Sayyidina Umar Al-Khattab Secondary School, which is built on land, also has catchment area in some villages of Kampong Ayer.

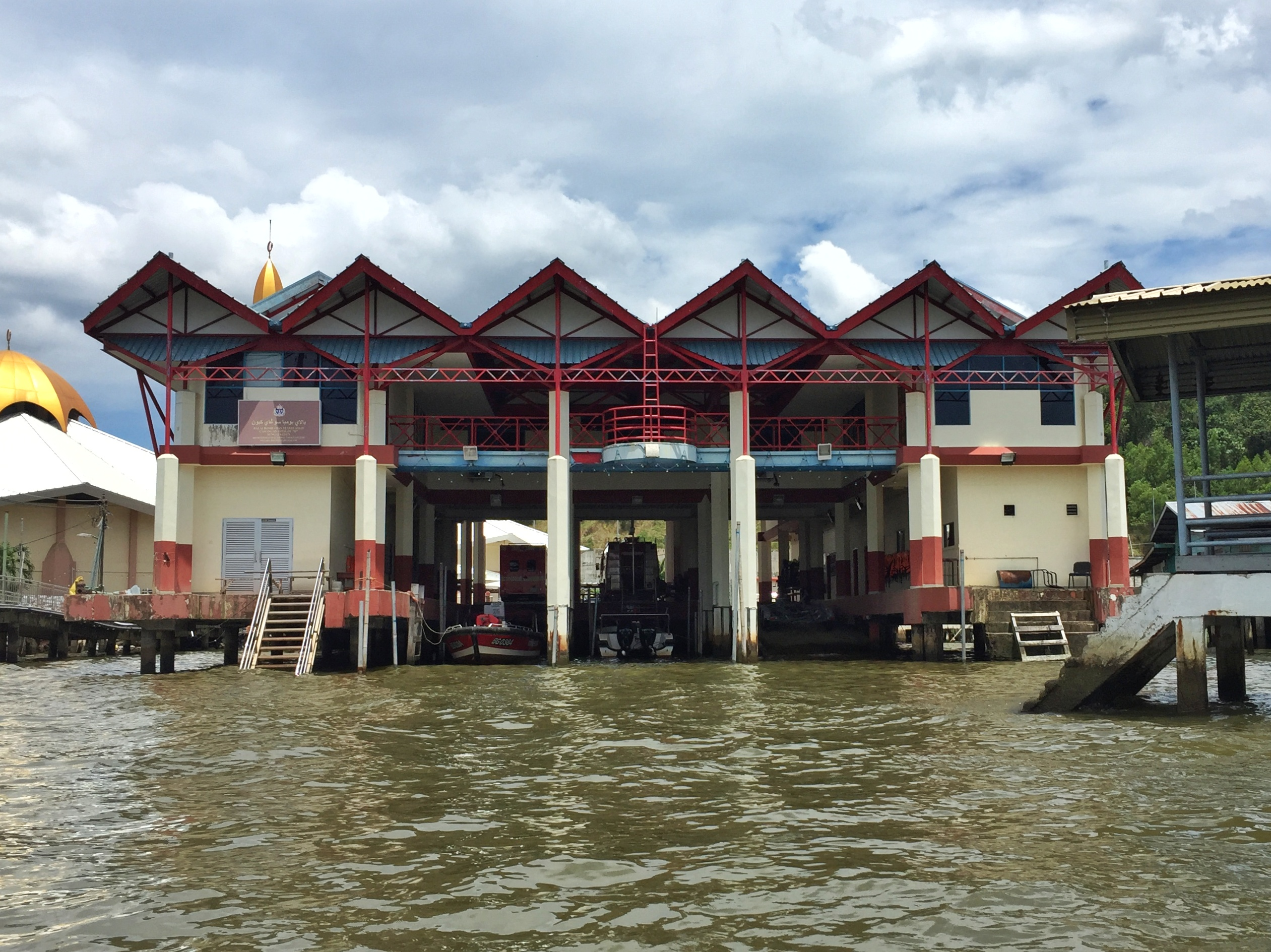
Waterside jetty and fireboat of Sungai Kebun Fire Station

Kampong Ayer Police Station, a historic police station built on stilts within the water village area of Bandar Seri Begawan, Brunei.

Other public facilities include mosques, police stations and fire departments. Fire cases are common in Kampong Ayer, in which the reported main causes include faulty wiring and susceptibility of the buildings to fire due to many being built of wood.

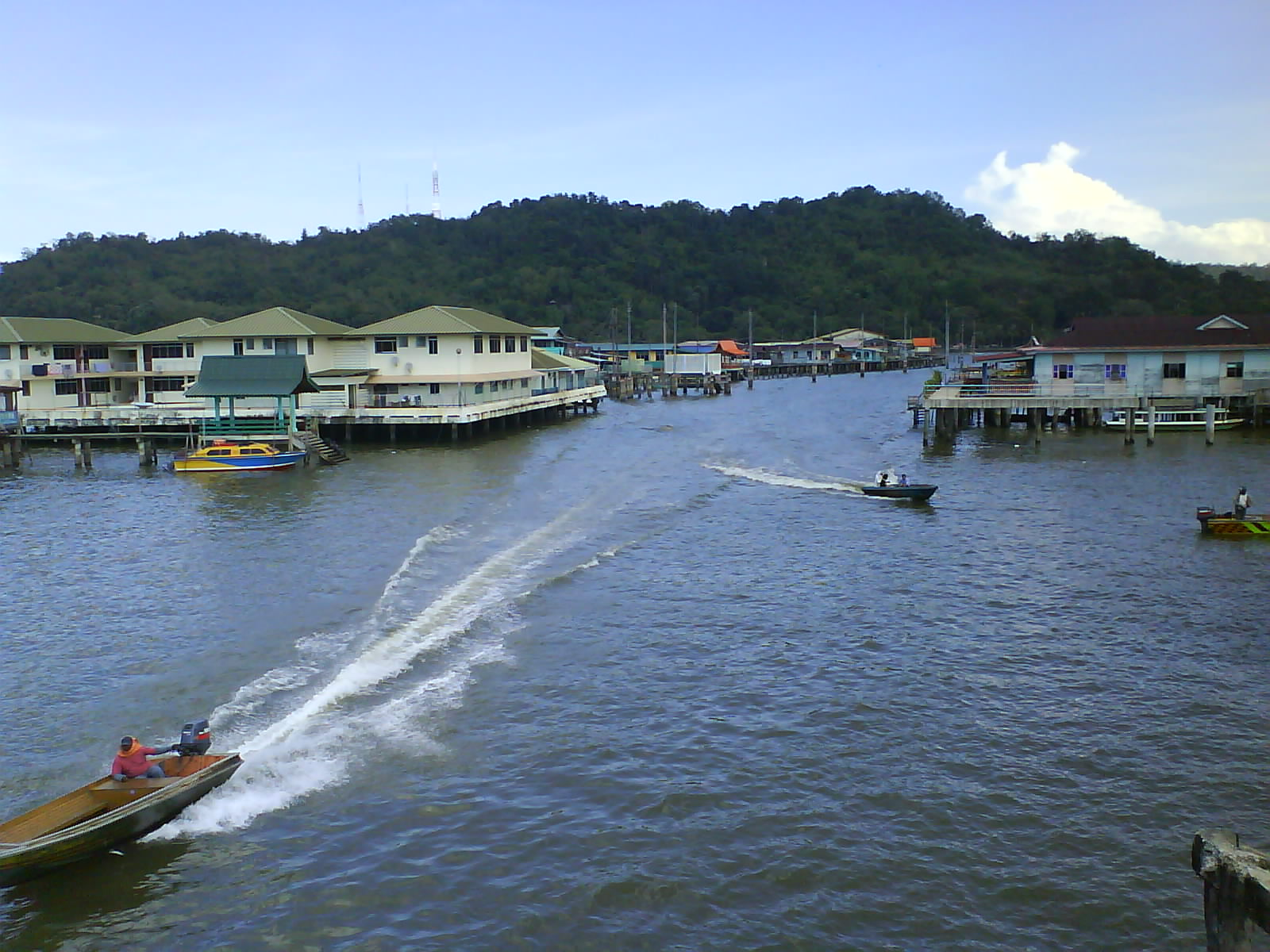
Boats at a waterway in Kampong Ayer

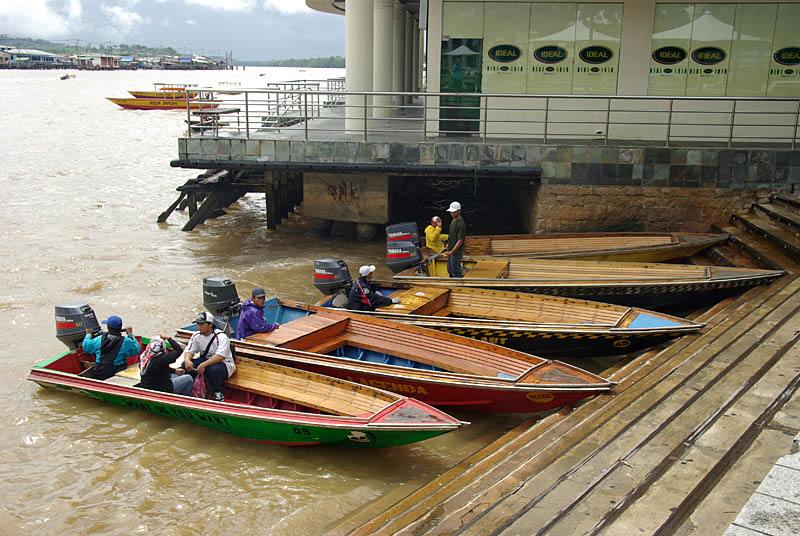
Water taxis transporting residents to Bandar Seri Begawan

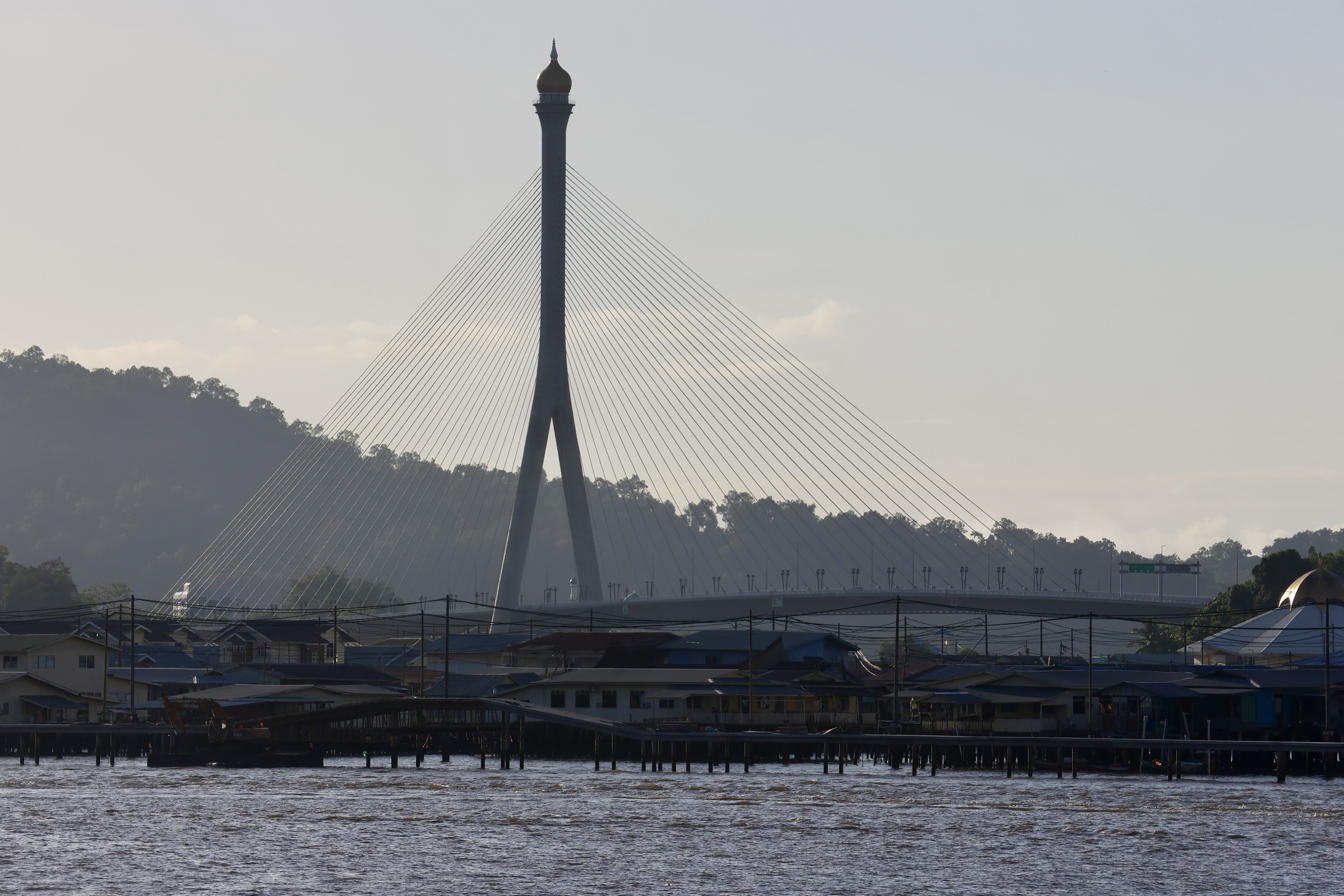
The village with the Raja Isteri Pengiran Anak Hajah Saleha Bridge in the background

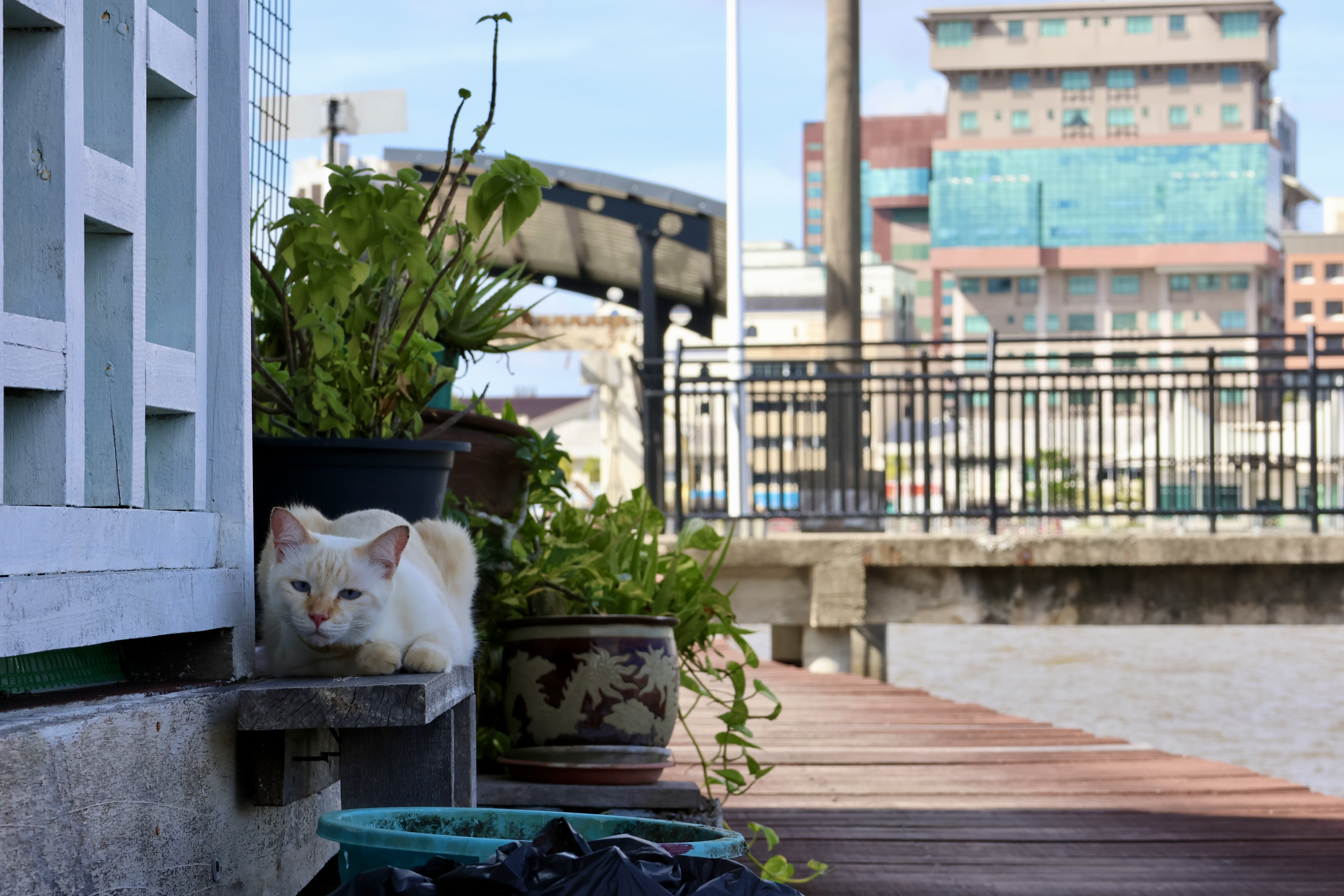
A pet cat living on the floating village

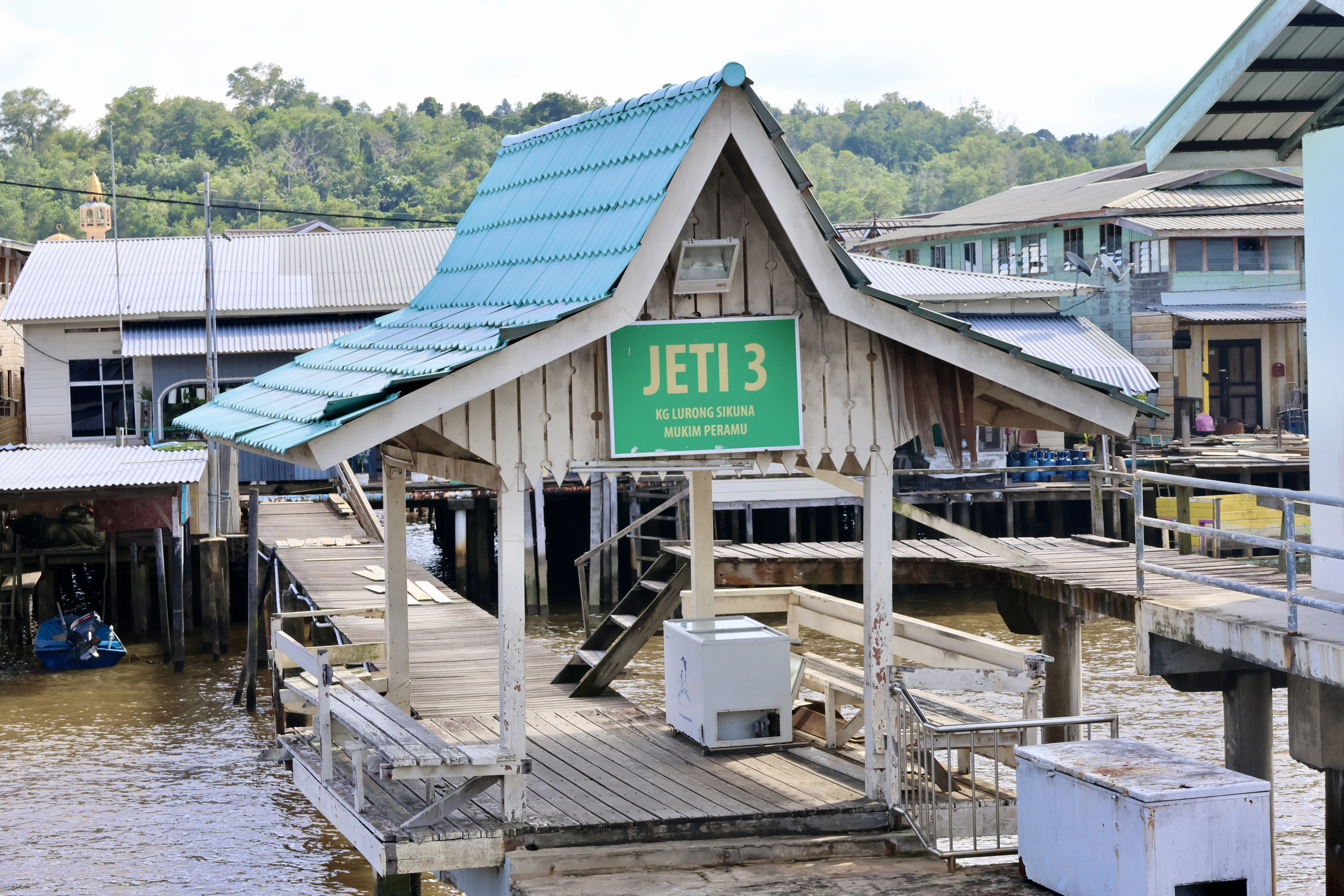
A boat jetty at the village

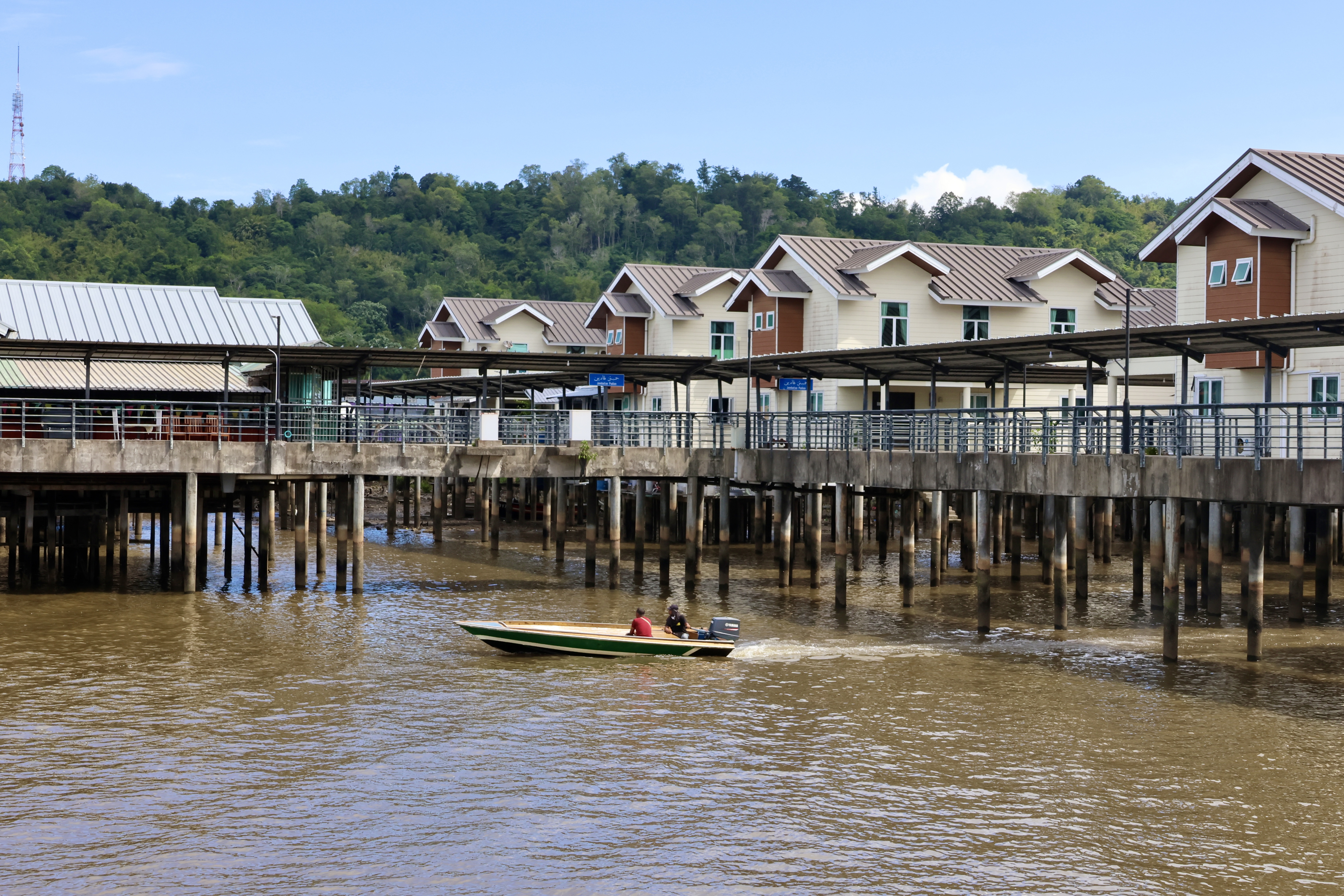
The village's new housing scheme

== Architecture and design ==
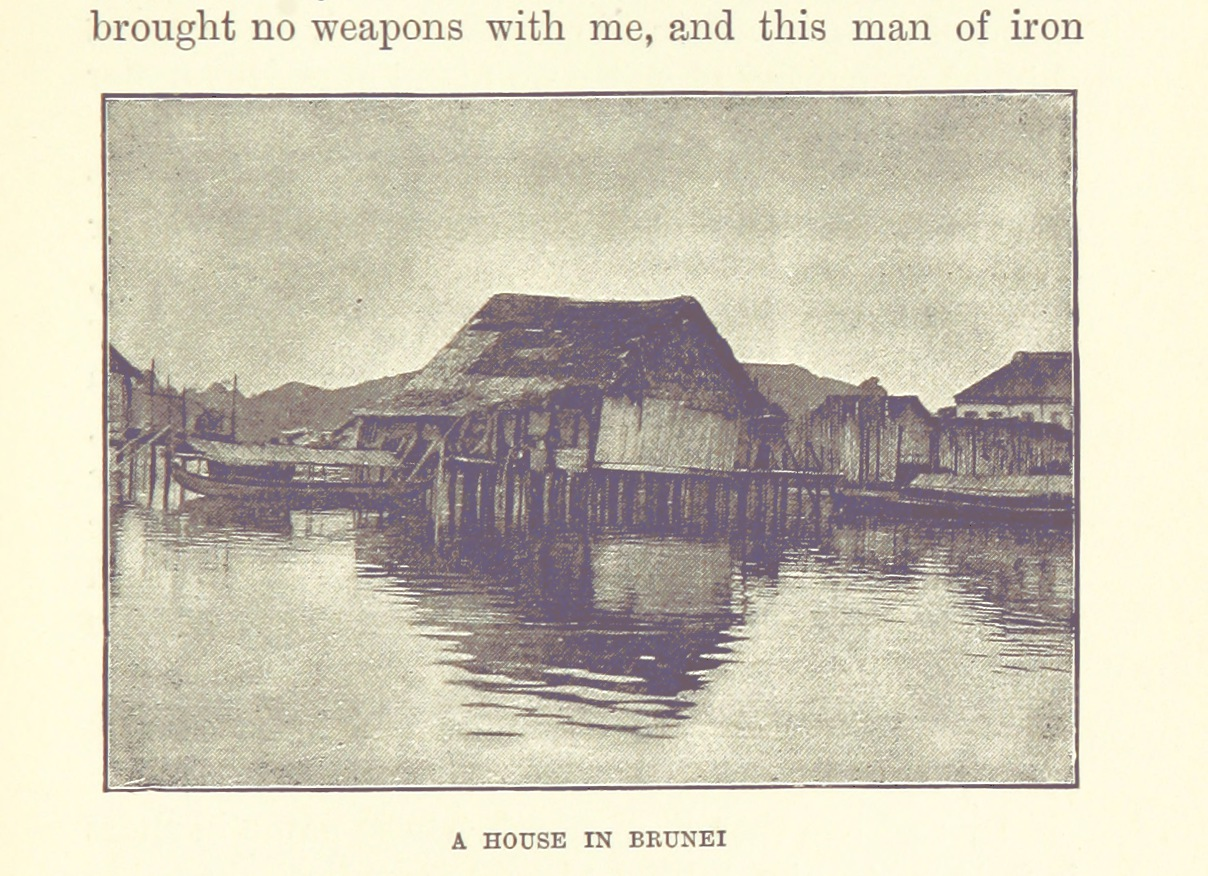
Traditional stilt houses in Kampong Ayer, 1891

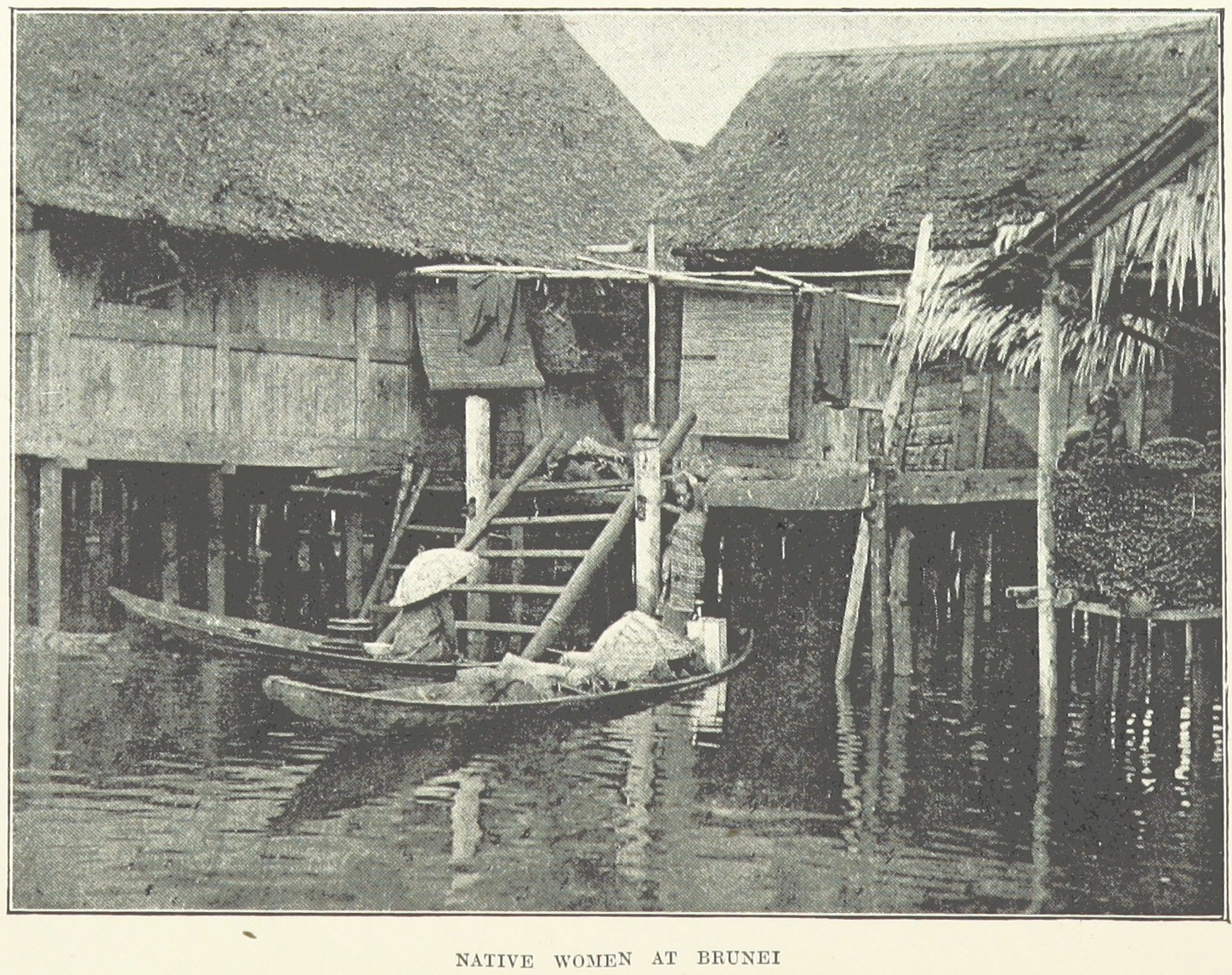
Bruneian Malays seen living at Kampong Ayer in 1891

Over the course of centuries, Kampong Ayer's architecture has had a major change, with its traditional dwellings being especially made to fit into the water-based environment. Originally built on stilts, these homes were made of sturdy materials that fit the local temperature and environmental circumstances, such nibung, kulimpapan, and bulian wood. Rainwater drainage was aided by the arrangement of palm leaves, bulian wood, or apung leaves for the roof, and mats were usually used to covered with nibung or bamboo flooring.

In Kampong Ayer, a number of unique traditional home styles were common. Typically built in the 19th century, the rumah belah bumbung was home to commoners and had an inverted V-shaped roof. These houses originally had apong shoots walls, but by the early 20th century, timber planks had taken their place. The rumah tungkup, which was frequently connected to the Pengirans or Pehins, was another noteworthy design. This kind of home had a tiny flat roof at the top and a roof that wrapped around the main house on all four sides. The rumah loteng was a type of home typically inhabited by upper-class families, distinguished by its two stories and attic. The attic was used for weaving, crafts, or storage, among other things.

Newer architectural designs, including the rumah potong limas and rumah berlanggar in the early and mid-20th century, were brought about by Brunei's expanding prosperity, especially after the discovery of oil. The rumah potong limas used contemporary materials like timber stilts and processed walls with traditional design components. The rumah berlanggar added a chamber, forming an L-shaped building that accommodated both religious rituals and everyday household needs.

Kampong Ayer's architecture reflected both traditional and modern elements as it developed. The basic architectural concepts, such as elevated dwellings and adaption to the water-based environment, remained essential to the village's character even as building materials and methods changed. Kampong Ayer is a place where tradition and modernity continue to coexist, as seen by the buildings like Bubungan Dua Belas, which combine Brunei Malay and Western architectural aspects.

== Challenges ==
=== Survival ===
As a major historical and cultural heritage of Brunei, there has been increasing concern on the survival of Kampong Ayer in modern times. This is factored by the emigration and relocation of the inhabitants to land. Over the last few decades, the overall population has been shrinking, estimated to have decreased from about 28,000 in 1981 to 13,000 in 2011. The diminishing population, added with the busy modern lifestyle, are threatening the survival of the customs and traditions practiced in Kampong Ayer. It also weakens the sense of community among the residents.

=== Waste ===
The floating of rubbish and sewage on the waters of Kampong Ayer is a persisting issue despite substantial measures and initiatives taken by various government and non-government agencies. It is acknowledged that the sources of the problem are not simply from within Kampong Ayer but may also due to ineffective waste management on land, specifically in the vicinity of upstream tributaries and streams of the Brunei River, in which Kampong Ayer lay along its downstream flow. Measures have been implemented by the government which include upgrading and installation of sewage treatment works in the catchment areas, as well as installation of rubbish collection system in the villages of Kampong Ayer. However, complete success is still yet to be seen. Systematic sewage disposal in Kampong Ayer itself is only feasible on public housing villages, namely Bolkiah 'A', Bolkiah 'B' and Sungai Bunga, where they have organised residential layout, where as in the traditional villages, which constitute the majority of Kampong Ayer areas, such disposal system is still not yet available.

Non-government organisations also play significant roles in combatting this issue. Together with the government, as well as the general public, in particular the Kampong Ayer residents, multiple cleaning campaigns have been conducted. Awareness programmes to the public on the importance of waste management have also been carried out for many years. Again, the effectiveness of such programmes have yet to completely yield the desired results.

== Notable people ==
- Pengiran Muhammad Salleh (1890–1969), politician and state kadi
- Pengiran Muhammad Ali (1916–2005), politician and teacher.
- Husain Yusof (1918–2010), teacher.
- Jamil Al-Sufri (1921–2021), historian and former director of Brunei History Centre.
- Pengiran Abdul Momin (1923–2006), politician and diplomat
- Abdul Rahman Taha (1930–2005), politician and civil servant
- Hussain Mohammad Yusof (1933–2012), politician and minister
- Ali Mohammad Daud (1936–2018), politician and diplomat
- Abdul Aziz Juned (born 1941), state mufti.
- Ya'akub Zainal (born 1941), politician and police commissioner.
- Badaruddin Othman (born 1942), politician and minister.
- Abdul Rahman Abdul Karim (1943–2019), politician and businessman.
- Abu Bakar Apong (born 1948), politician and minister.
- Abdul Wahab Juned (born 1949), politician and minister.
- Abdullah Bakar (born 1951), politician and minister.
- Adnan Yusof (born 1952), politician and minister.
- Hazair Abdullah (born 1953), politician and minister.
- Yahya Bakar (born 1954), politician and minister.
- Abdul Rahman Ibrahim (born 1954), politician and minister.
- Pengiran Anak Muhammad Bey Muntassir (1956–2009), nobility.
- Abdul Jalil Ahmad, military officer and diplomat
