= Kampong Sungai Lampai =

Village in Brunei

Kampong Sungai Lampai Kampung Sungai Lampai
- Village and neighbourhood
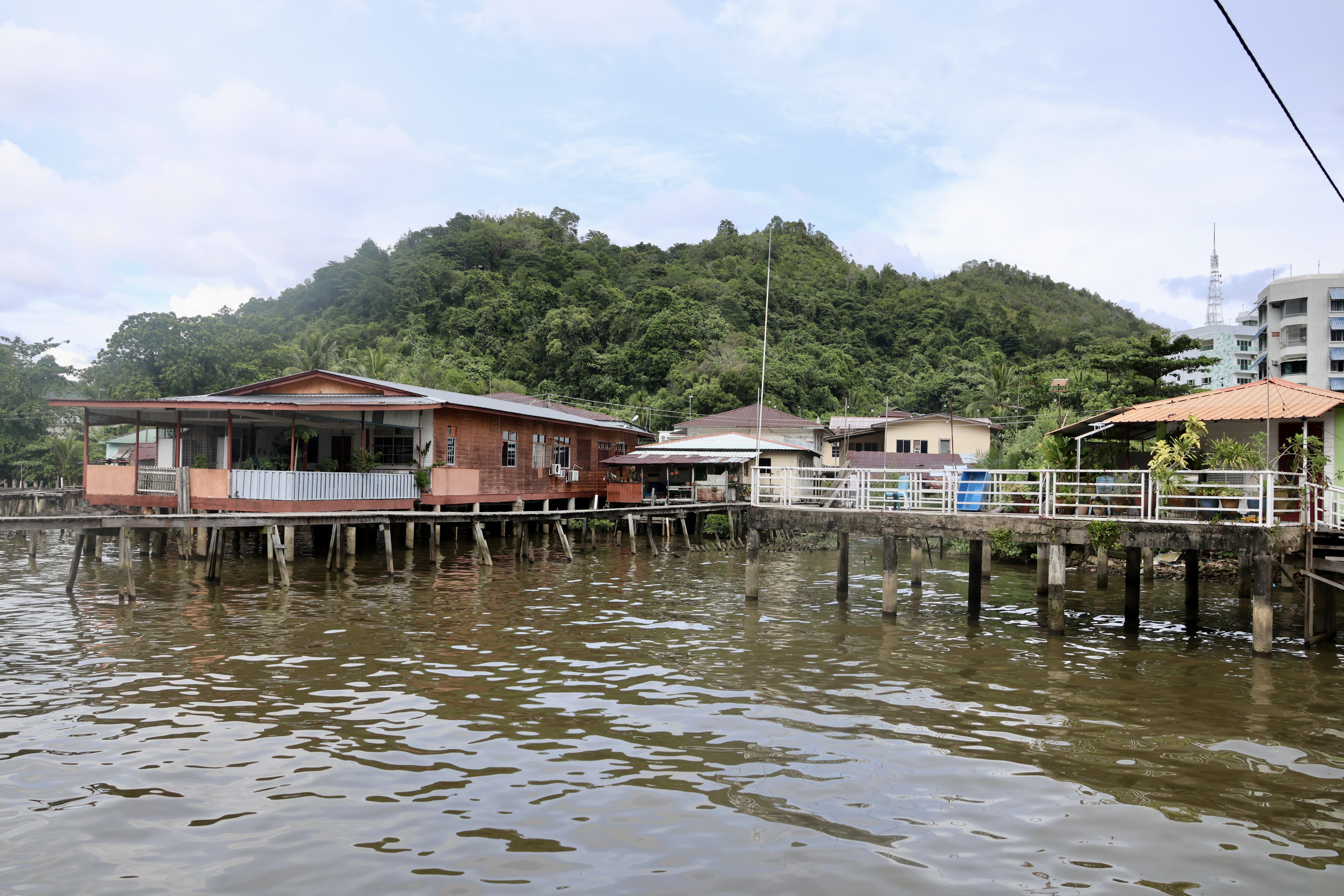
- Stilt homes at the village

- Location in Brunei
- Coordinates: 4°52′29″N 114°57′13″E
- Country: Brunei
- District: Brunei-Muara
- Mukim: Kota Batu

Government
  - Village head: Hanipah Junit

Population (2016)
  - Total: 314
- Time zone: UTC+8 (BNT)
- Postcode: BD1117

Kampong Sungai Lampai is a village in Brunei-Muara District, Brunei. It is also a neighbourhood in the country's capital Bandar Seri Begawan. The population was 314 in 2016. It is one of the villages within Mukim Kota Batu. The postcode is BD1117.

== History ==
During the Castilian War, Bendahara Sakam utilised Sungai Lampai and Kampong Pintu Malim as strongholds to repel Spanish incursions. It is believed that the origins of Kampong Ayer trace back several centuries to the establishment of a community in Kampong Sungai Lampai.

The first British resident, Malcolm McArthur, moved Brunei's administrative centre from Kampong Ayer to Sungai Lampai when the British Resident system was put into place in 1906 for political, economic, social, and health reasons. The first administrative buildings, including as the police station, jails, and the customs and excise division, were located at Sungai Lampai. The creation of contemporary Brunei Town, present day Bandar Seri Begawan, began when a 1.5-mile (2.4 km) road was built along the Brunei riverfront to connect Sungai Lampai to the future town.

== Infrastructure ==
Listed in the First Schedule of the Customs Enactment, 1954, Sungai Lampai saw significant development starting in 1960, including the construction of a customs checking station slated for completion in early 1961. Later, under the Customs (Amendment) Regulations, 1980, the Sungai Lampai Jetty was officially designated as a legal landing site for customs operations.

According to a 1964 report, the Marine Fire Station at Sungai Lampai was being built with moorings for speedboats and fire floats as well as quarters for the crew members who were on duty.
