= Mukim Peramu =

Mukim of Brunei

Coordinates: 4.884°N 114.944°E

- Mukim
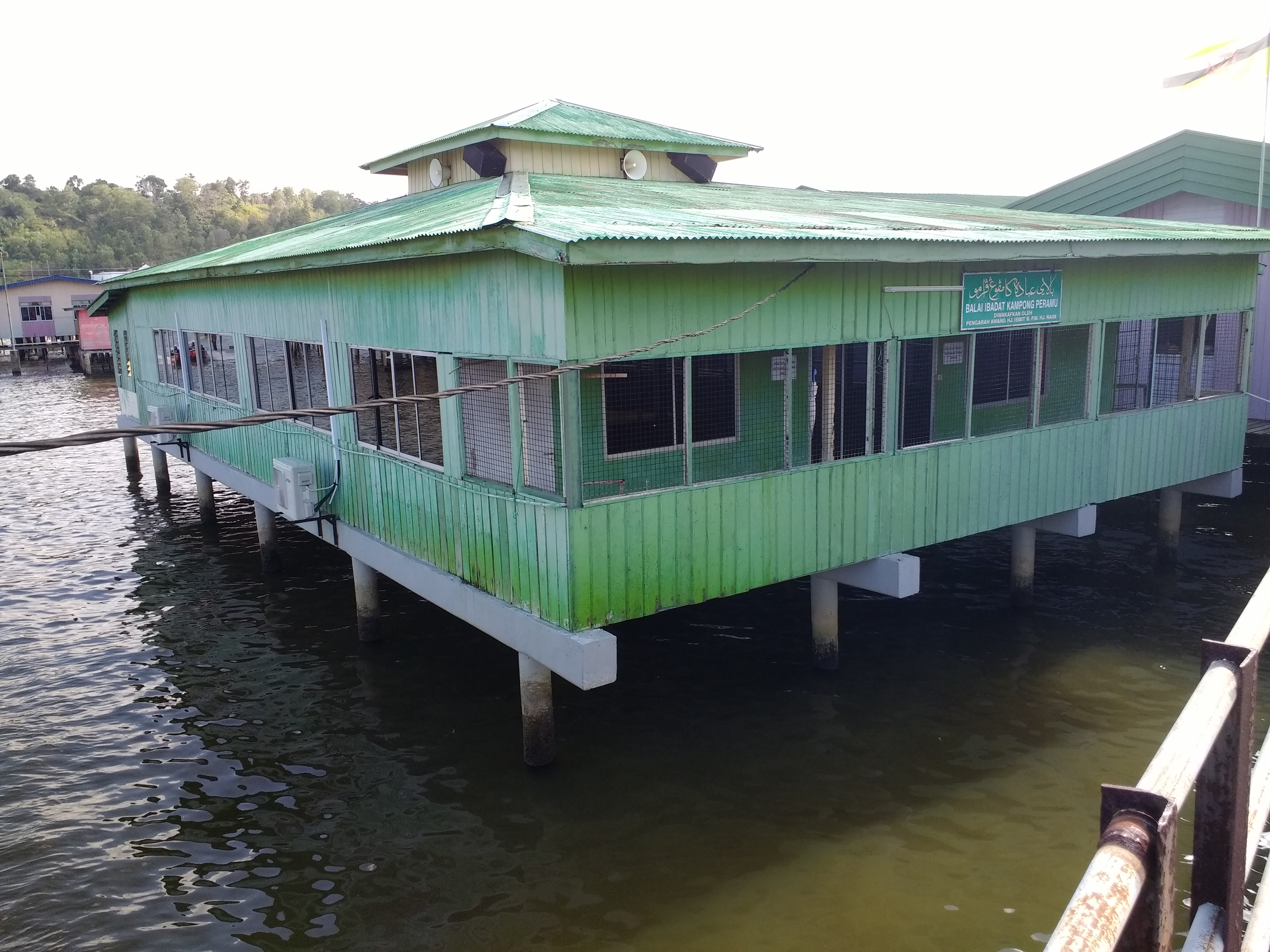
- Balai Ibadat Kampong Peramu

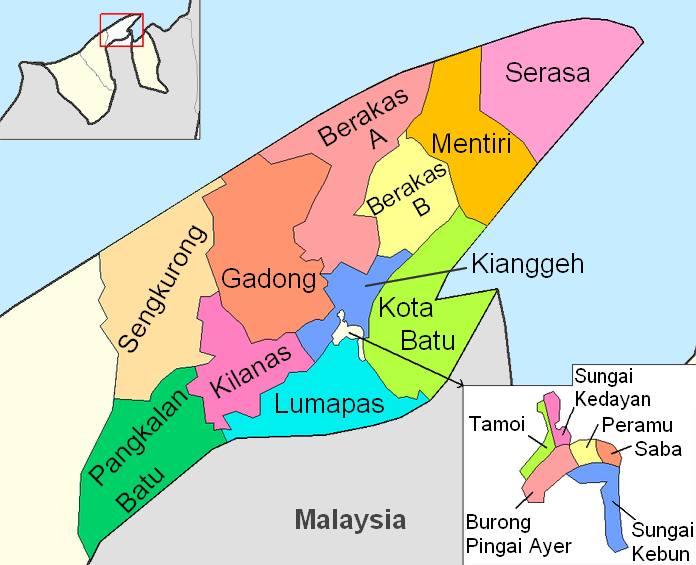
- Peramu is in yellow.
- Country: Brunei
- District: Brunei-Muara

Government
  - Penghulu: Raimi Rashid (Acting)

Population (2021)
  - Total: 1,151
- Time zone: UTC+8 (BNT)
- Postcode: BPxx26

Mukim Peramu is a mukim in Brunei-Muara District, Brunei. It is located within Kampong Ayer, the historical stilt settlements on the Brunei River in the capital Bandar Seri Begawan. The population was 1,111 in 2016.

== Etymology ==
Kampong Lurong Sikuna, where ships were anchored, gets its name from the English word schooner, as it did in the past. The mukim could be named after Kampong Peramu, one of the villages it encompasses.

== Geography ==
The mukim borders Mukim Kianggeh to the north, Mukim Saba to the east, Mukim Sungai Kebun to the south and Mukim Burong Pingai Ayer to the west.

== Demography ==
As of 2016 census, the population 1,111 with 49.95% males and 50.05% females. The mukim had 169 households occupying 169 dwellings. The entire population lived in urban areas. Among the occupations of the villagers is rowing boats and making sweets.

== Administration ==
As of 2021, the mukim comprised the following villages:

| Settlements | Population (2021) | Ketua kampung (2024) |
|---|---|---|
| Kampong Peramu | 427 | Haji Mayalin bin Haji Saat |
| Kampong Bakut Pengiran Si Raja Muda 'A' | 73 | Haji Mayalin bin Haji Saat |
| Kampong Bakut Pengiran Si Raja Muda 'B' | 110 | Haji Mayalin bin Haji Saat |
| Kampong Bakut Berumput | 53 | Haji Mayalin bin Haji Saat |
| Kampong Lurong Sikuna | 66 | Haji Mayalin bin Haji Saat |
| Kampong Setia Pahlawan | 202 | Haji Mayalin bin Haji Saat |
| Kampong Pekilong Muara | 220 | Haji Mayalin bin Haji Saat |

== Villages ==
=== Kampong Lurong Sikuna ===
In 2014, the village experienced changes and development with the Projek Perintis Menaik Taraf Kampung Ayer which is an initiative of the Sultan of Brunei towards beautifying the surroundings of Kampong Ayer with the construction of strong and organized modern houses. The houses built maintain the characteristics of the houses in Kampong Ayer, are provided the same facilities as on land and help to protect the environment, especially the water of the Brunei River. With the construction of houses on the project, Kampong Ayer, especially Kampong Lurong Sikuna, always receives visitors, especially tourists. The houses made it unique due to its layout which are comfortable and safe to live in.

== Economy ==
During the Information Department's Program Sua Muka to Mukim Peramu, the writer had the opportunity to visit a house owned by Awang Ahmad bin Haji Timbang where he made a collection of old items belonging to his family. In addition to old items, he is also interested in collecting souvenirs in the form of cups, plates and so on that are given in conjunction with an event. For him, although it seems trivial, it may be of historical value in the future. Among the most valuable souvenirs for him is the cup he got during the inauguration of the Sultan Omar Ali Saifuddien Mosque in 1958. His house also often receives visits from visitors who want to know about the old items that were used by the people of Kampung Ayer.

== Infrastructure ==
Although it is located in Kampong Ayer, it is not exempted from receiving various basic facilities such as running water, electricity, telephone and some other developments such as worship halls and schools. Among the developments in this subdistrict is the construction of the Projek Perintis Menaik Taraf Kampung Air involving open spaces in Mukim Peramu and Mukim Saba.

=== Housing ===
With the construction of houses on the project, Kampung Ayer always receives visitors, especially tourists, every day. The houses make it unique because of their layout which is comfortable and safe to live in. The construction of houses with concrete pillars, cement floors, fireproof wood walls, shows that the houses are built using high quality materials. The house under this project has been made two floors. The concrete playground facility that was built also makes it easier for the youth of Mukim Peramu to use it in the evening to play soccer. With these projects to upgrade Kampung Ayer, in addition to some basic facilities available, residents in Kampong Ayer are ready to continue living there. This is important to preserve the heritage of their ancestors.

=== Education ===
Pengiran Anak Puteri Besar Primary School is the sole primary school.

=== Places of interest ===
- The Balai Ibadat of Kampong Peramu is the sole mosque and serves the Muslim residents for congregational Islamic prayers and activities.
- Kampong Ayer Culture and Tourism Gallery is a museum that was inaugurated on 19 August 2009, mainly focused by visitors, especially tourists from abroad.
