= Mukim Burong Pingai Ayer =

Mukim of Brunei

Coordinates: 4.881°N 114.939°E

- Mukim
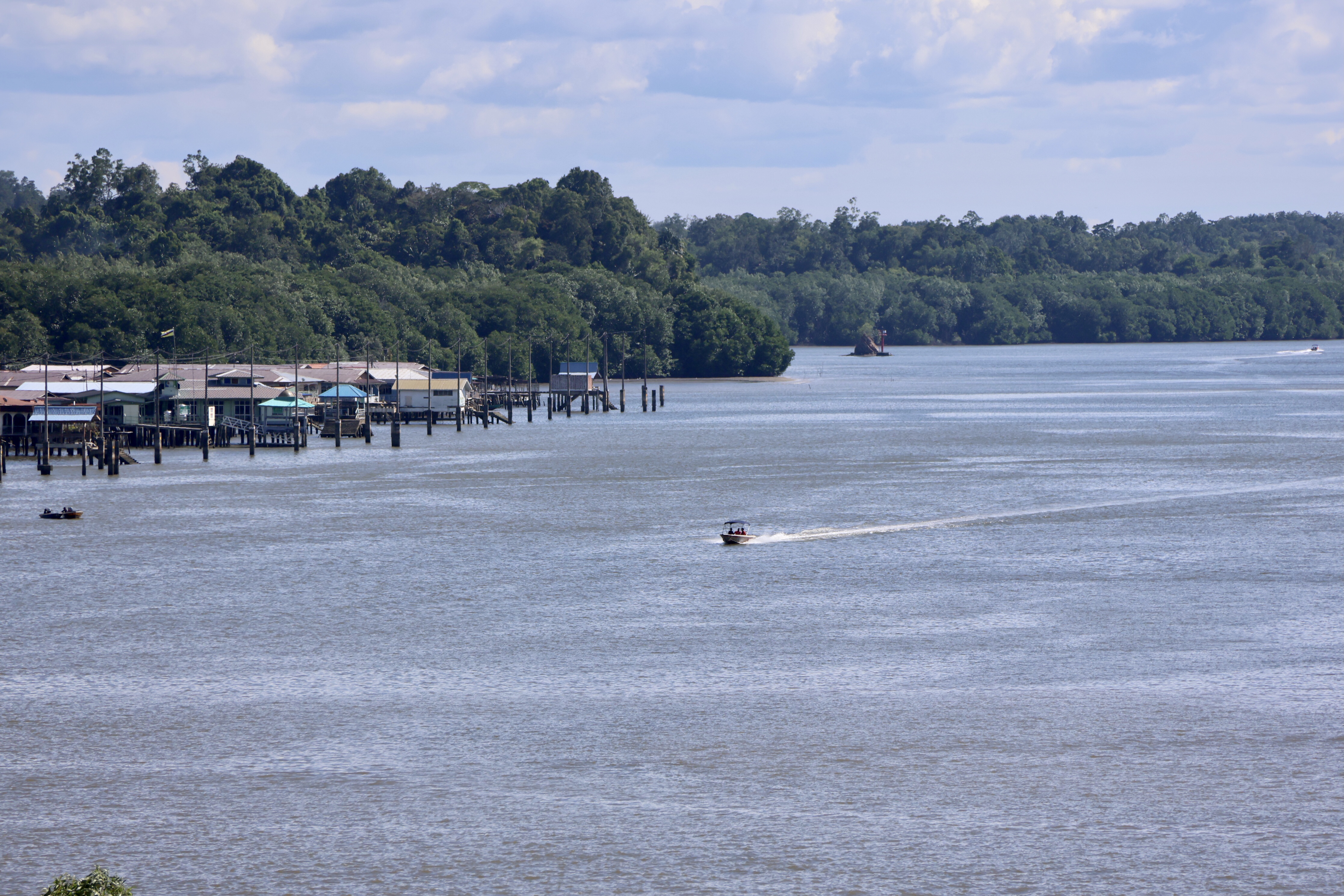
- Stilt houses of Burong Pingai Ayer facing the Brunei River

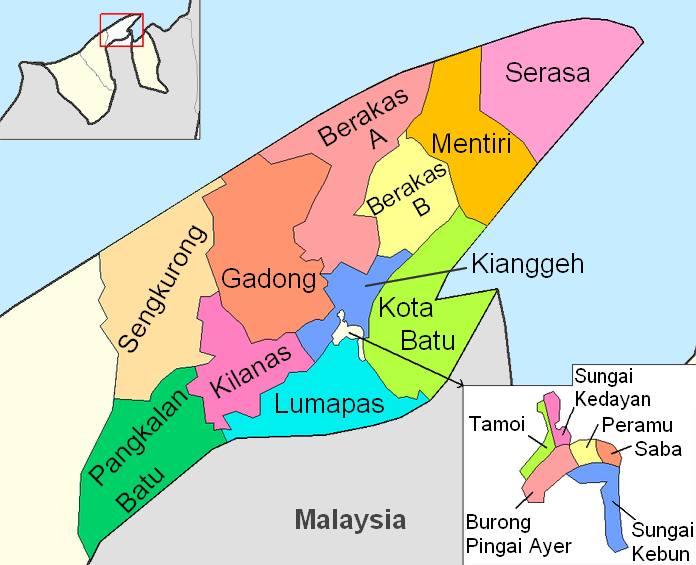
- Burong Pingai Ayer is in peach.
- Country: Brunei
- District: Brunei-Muara

Government
  - Penghulu: Raimi Rashid (Acting)

Area
  - Total: 0.5669 km^{2} (0.2189 sq mi)

Population (2021)
  - Total: 1,459
  - Density: 2,574/km^{2} (6,666/sq mi)
- Time zone: UTC+8 (BNT)
- Postcode: BMxx26

Mukim Burong Pingai Ayer is a mukim in Brunei-Muara District, Brunei. It is located within Kampong Ayer, the traditional stilt settlements on the Brunei River in the capital Bandar Seri Begawan. The population was 1,770 in 2016.

== Etymology ==
The mukim is named after Kampong Burong Pingai Ayer, one of the villages it encompasses. Over time, several names have altered such as Kampong Sungai Pandan, which was formerly known as Kampong Sungai Kuyuk, which was less popular because kuyuk in Bruneian dialect means dog. It is unknown where the name came from. Some people hypothesized that there were dogs in the neighborhood scavenging at close-by dumps for trash. Its current name is Sungai Pandan. Most likely the name was changed because of a complaint.

Built on a sandbank on the Brunei River, Kampong Bakut China was another settlement that underwent name changes (from the word bakut for sandbank and the Chinese businessmen who used to conduct trading there). It was once the main marketplace for the residents of Kampong Ayer, and businesses were once performed there. Since pekan, which means town in Bruneian, was given due to there being a little business center or town, the name was changed to Kampong Pekan Lama. Despite the fact that the market and other enterprises are no longer operated in that hamlet, Kampong Pekan Lama (old town) is still known by that name.

== Geography ==
The mukim borders Mukim Sungai Kedayan to the north, Mukim Peramu and Mukim Sungai Kebun to the east, Mukim Lumapas to the south, Mukim Kianggeh to the west and Mukim Tamoi to the west and north-west.

== Demographics ==
As of 2016 census, the population of Mukim Burong Pingai Ayer comprised 889 males and 881 females. The mukim had 264 households occupying 264 dwellings. The entire population lived in urban areas.

== Administration ==
As of 2021, the mukim comprised the following villages:

Settlements	Population (2021)	Ketua kampung (2024)
Kampong Burong Pingai Ayer	431	Haji Tarip bin Haji Asgar
Kampong Lurong Dalam	258	Haji Tarip bin Haji Asgar
Kampong Pandai Besi 'A'	87	Haji Tarip bin Haji Asgar
Kampong Pandai Besi 'B'	159	Haji Tarip bin Haji Asgar
Kampong Sungai Pandan 'A'	168	Haji Tarip bin Haji Asgar
Kampong Sungai Pandan 'B'	72	Haji Tarip bin Haji Asgar
Kampong Pengiran Setia Negara	86	Haji Tarip bin Haji Asgar
Kampong Pekan Lama	198	Haji Tarip bin Haji Asgar

== Villages ==
=== Kampong Pandai Besi ===
According to folk tale, the origin of its name came about from the smithing activities that were carried out at that time and that they were skilled in making tools such as swords, daggers and other tools. Following the activities at that time, the name 'Pandai Besi' was given to the village and unfortunately the carpentry ceased to exist around the 1970s. Kampong Pandai Besi, which translates to good at metal, was formerly known as Kampong Padaun and Kampong Pemeriuk.

Kampung Pandai Besi 'A' and 'B' is one of the villages located under Mukim Burong Pingai Ayer. There are 56 houses in the village with a population of approximately 460 people. Some of the youth are also active in various fields including sports such as table tennis, netball and darts in one of the medium-sized halls and they often participate in competitions organized by other villages. In addition to the village tahlil event, the village also participates in other contests such as a parade in conjunction with the celebration of the Maulud of the Islamic prophet Muhammad.

== Infrastructure ==
Like other mukims in the country, Mukim Burong Pingai Ayer is also provided with several public facilities such as the Surau Balai Ibadat Kampung Sungai Pandan, the Surau Balai Ibadat Kampung Lurong Dalam, Pengiran Muda Al-Muhtadee Billah Religious School, community hall and Dato Ahmad Primary School. In addition, the mukim also has basic facilities such as bridges, water supply, electricity supply, telephone lines, bridge piers and garbage disposal services. While for the comfort and convenience of the villagers in the mukim to do various activities, an infrastructure, namely the Burong Pingai Ayer Mukim Multipurpose Hall was built in 2014.

=== Mosques ===
- Pehin Datu Imam Haji Abdul Mokti Mosque
- Balai Ibadat Kampong Sungai Pandan — a balai ibadat (literally 'worship hall') in Kampong Sungai Pandan. It was built in 1992 and can accommodate 300 worshippers.

== Boat Racing Team ==
Boat racing is synonymous with the life of the people of Kampong Ayer. For Mukim Burong Pingai Ayer, the main boat racing team is Team Lela Cheteria from Kampong Lurong Dalam. The team has managed to make the country known at the regional level. Established in 2013, Team Lela Cheteria managed to achieve several successes not only in the country but also abroad.

Under the Brunei Darussalam Boat Racing Association (PEKEBAR), one of the successes achieved by the paddlers under the Lela Cheteria Team was when they participated in the International Dragon Boat Race held in Kota Kinabalu, Sabah, Malaysia in 2014, they won the championship, runner-up and third place for several contested categories. Meanwhile, in the same year the team continued to make a name for themselves after winning second place for two categories, namely 12 paddlers (male) and 20 paddlers (male) in the International Dragon Boat Race held in Kuching, Sarawak, Malaysia. The following years also brought luck to Team Lela Cheteria's boat racing team by winning several categories contested at the same match.
