= Raja Isteri Pengiran Anak Hajah Saleha Bridge =

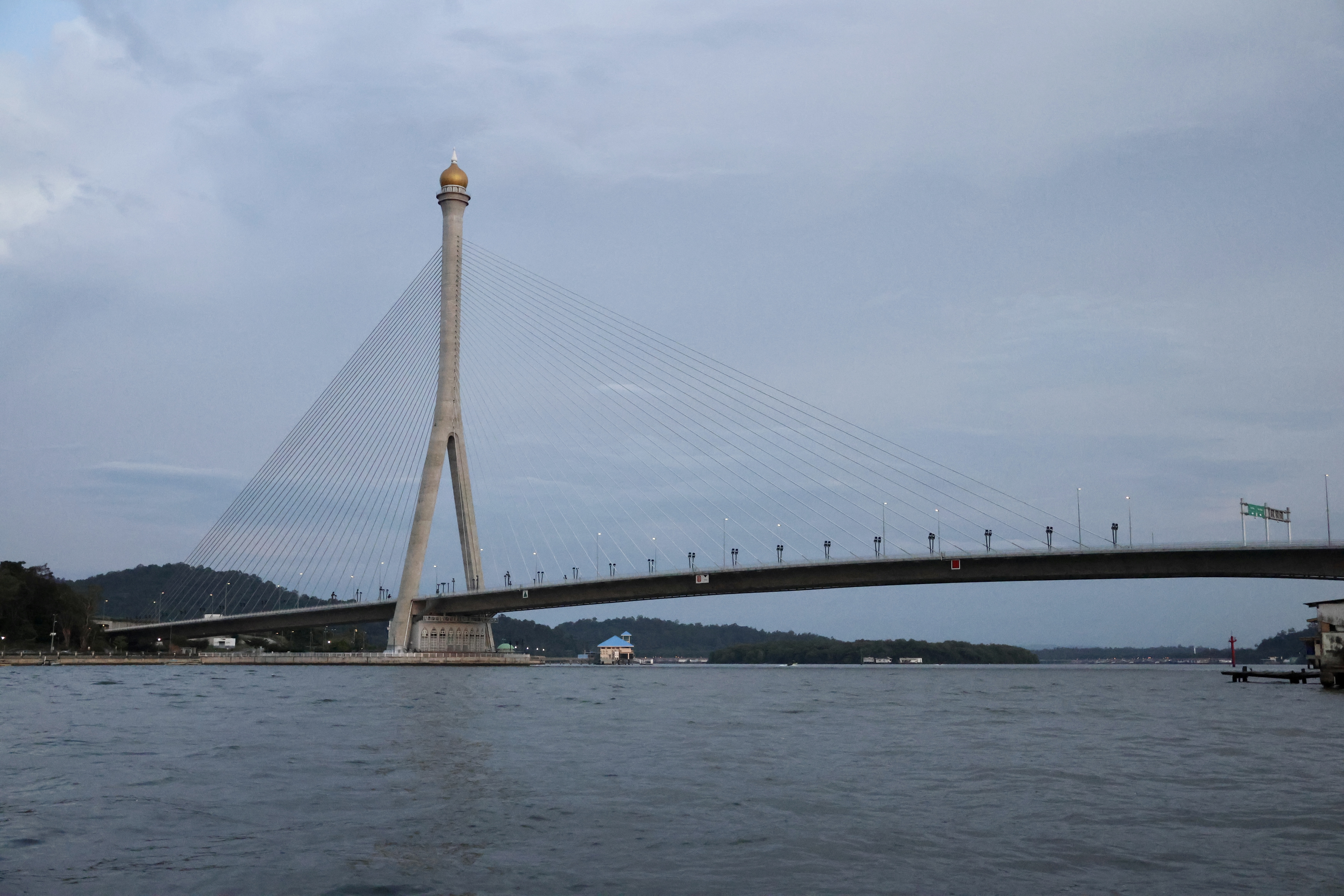
- Coordinates: 4.876528°N 114.949944°E
- Carries: motor vehicles, pedestrian
- Crosses: Brunei River
- Locale: Bandar Seri Begawan, Brunei
- Other name(s): Sungai Kebun Bridge
- Maintained by: Public Works Department

Characteristics
- Design: cable-stayed bridge
- Total length: 622 m (2,041 ft)
- Height: 157 m (515 ft)
- Longest span: 300 m (984 ft)

History
- Constructed by: (South Korea) Daelim Industrial (Brunei) Swee
- Built: 2014–2017
- Construction cost: B$139,000,000
- Inaugurated: 14 October 2017

The Raja Isteri Pengiran Anak Hajah Saleha Bridge (Malay: Jambatan Raja Isteri Pengiran Anak Hajah Saleha; Jawi: جمبتن راج استري ڤڠيرن انق حاجه صاليها), also commonly known as Sungai Kebun Bridge (Jambatan Sungai Kebun), is a cable-stayed bridge which connects the Pusat Bandar and Mukim Lumapas in Bandar Seri Begawan, Brunei. It is named after Queen Saleha, the queen consort of the current Sultan Hassanal Bolkiah. Officially inaugurated on 14 October 2017, it became the country's first cable-stayed bridge, and its tower has since been the tallest structure.

== Design and features ==
The bridge's initial plan has a total length of 622 metres (2,041 ft) and the main span is 300 metres (980 ft). It is a cable-stayed bridge with one tower which rises to the height of 157 metres (515 ft). At the top is an Islamic dome with a diameter of 8.7 metres and weight of 9.5 tonnes (9.3 long tons; 10.5 short tons). On the bridge is a dual-carriageway road with interchanges at both ends, as well as pedestrian sidewalks. The bridge's lone tower, which mimics the dome of a mosque and has plans for a prayer area on the first level, was designed to represent Brunei's Muslim culture.

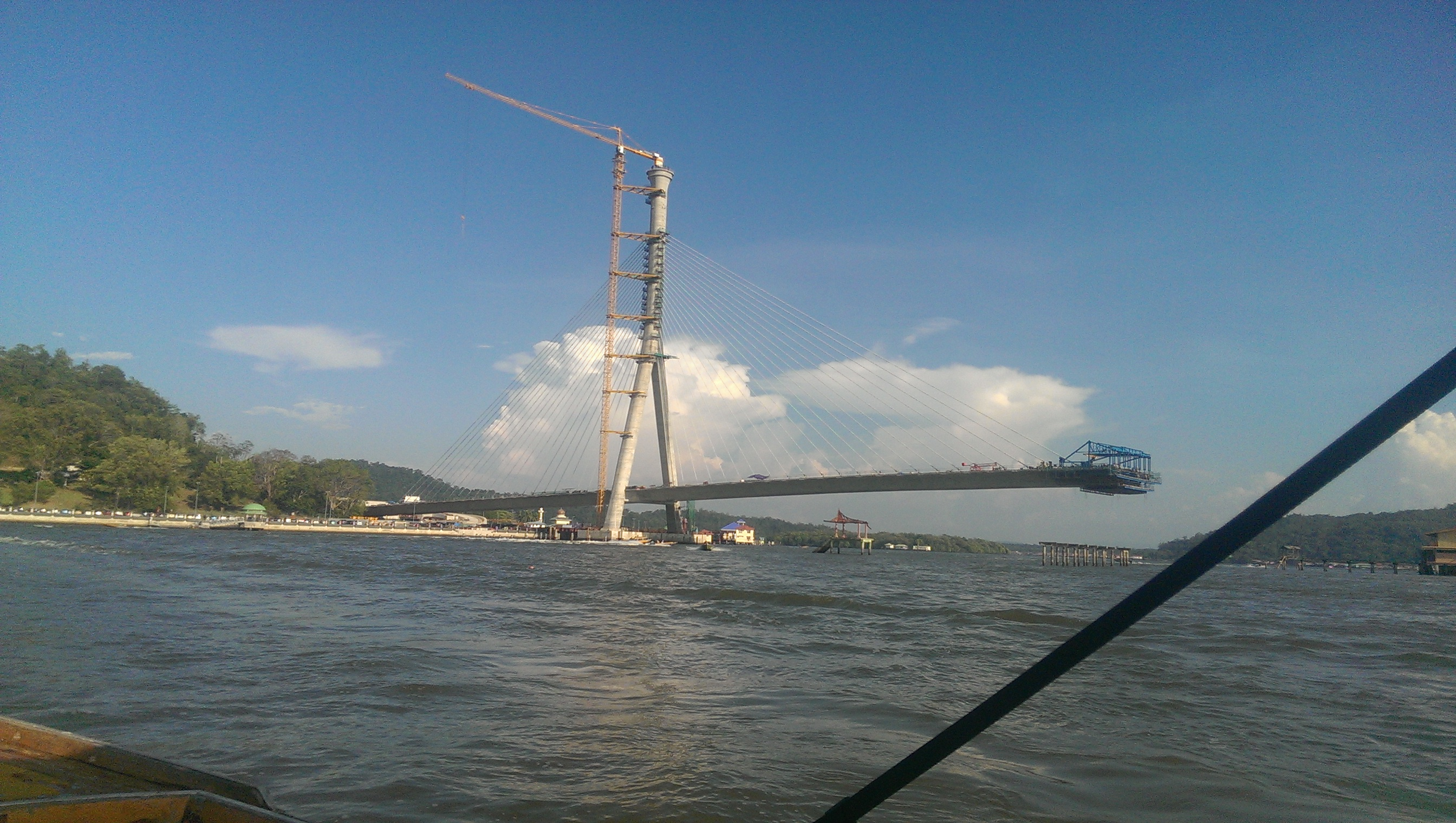
The Sungai Kebun Bridge in April 2016

== Construction ==
The Ministry of Development reached a success to begin the construction of the bridge in June 2013 as part of the 10th National Development Plan. The groundbreaking ceremony was held on 16 January 2014, officiated by the Crown Prince Al-Muhtadee Billah. The joint-venture between the South Korean company Daelim Industrial and local Swee constructed the bridge, which took about three years and cost 139 million Brunei dollar (B$100 million as of October 2017).

The bridge began to open to the public on 2 October 2017 on a trial basis. On the 14th in the same month, it was finally inaugurated in a grand opening ceremony as part of the Golden Jubilee of Hassanal Bolkiah, which included fireworks display by Howard & Sons, Hunan Dream Fireworks and Liuyang Intently Fireworks, as well as procession of decorated floats.
