= Kampong Pintu Malim =

Village in Brunei

Kampong Pintu Malim Kampung Pintu Malim
- Village and neighbourhood
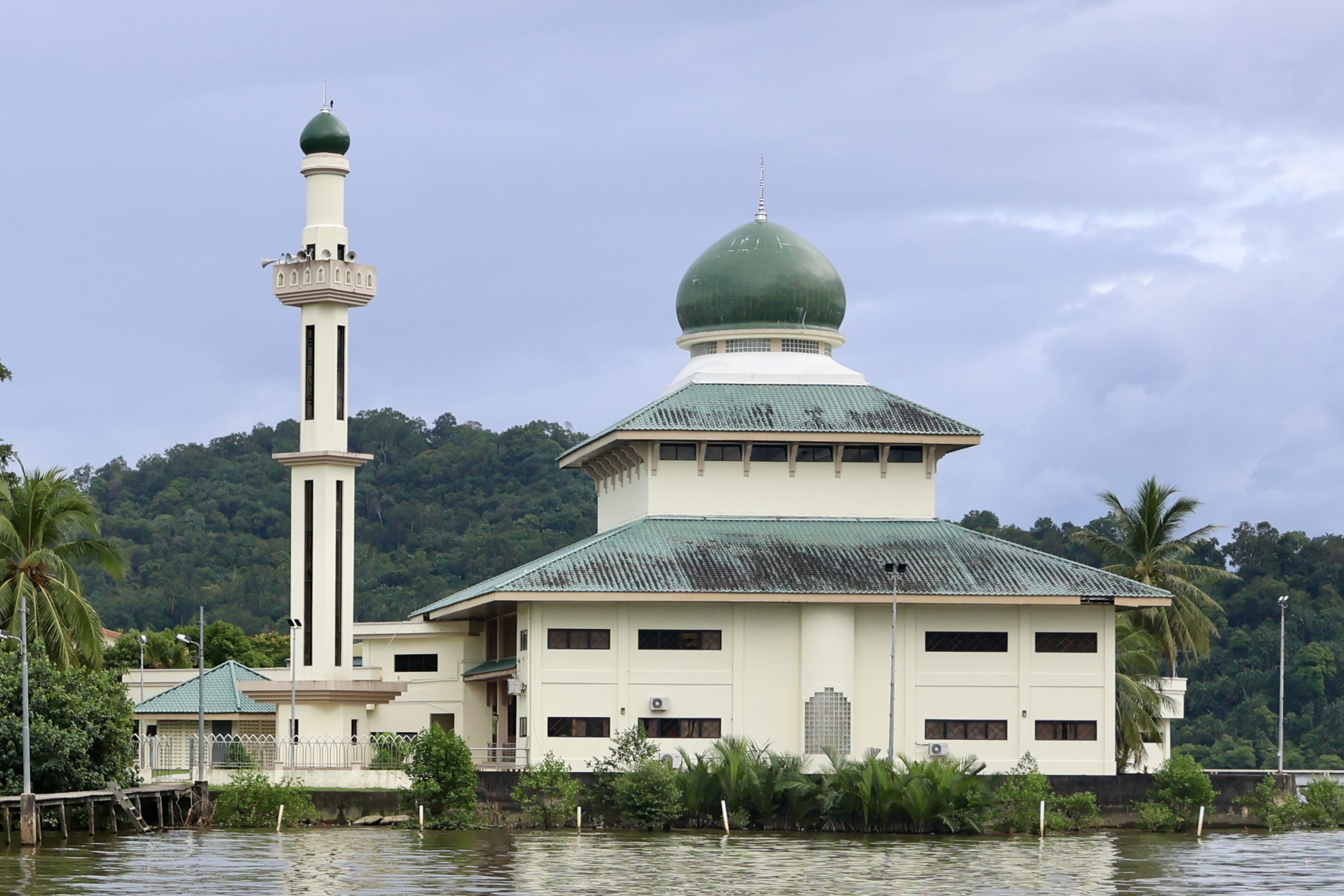
- Kampong Pintu Malim Mosque

- Location in Brunei
- Coordinates: 4°52′27″N 114°57′19″E
- Country: Brunei
- District: Brunei-Muara
- Mukim: Kota Batu

Government
  - Village head: Hanipah Junit

Population (2016)
  - Total: 319
- Time zone: UTC+8 (BNT)
- Postcode: BD1317

Kampong Pintu Malim (Malay: Kampung Pintu Malim) or simply Pintu Malim, is a village in Brunei-Muara District, Brunei. It is also a neighbourhood in the country's capital Bandar Seri Begawan. The population was 319 persons in 2016. It is one of the villages within Mukim Kota Batu. The postcode is BD1317.

== Infrastructure ==
Pintu Malim Primary School is the village's government primary school. It also shares grounds with Pintu Malim Religious School, the village's government school for the country's Islamic religious primary education.

The village mosque is Kampong Pintu Malim Mosque; the construction began in 1995 and completed in 1997. It can accommodate 1,000 worshippers.

Pulau Ambok (Monkey Island), located in the former Kampong Petagian near the Pintu Malim Mosque and the Haji Abdul Latif Timber Mill, is historically significant for several events. It served as a stronghold where Pengiran Bendahara Sakam trained Brunei warriors for the battle against the Spanish forces during the 1578–1579 Castilian War. Additionally, it was the site of a civil war between Sultan Abdul Hakkul Mubin and Bendahara Pengiran Muhyiddin. During this conflict, the island was used as a defensive fort for Muhyiddin as he awaited an attack from Mubin's forces from Kuala Sungai Brunei.

== Notable people ==
- Marsal Maun (1913–2000), politician and teacher
