= Mukim Saba =

Mukim of Brunei

Coordinates: 4°53′0″N 114°56′50″E

Mukim Saba Kampong Saba
- Mukim
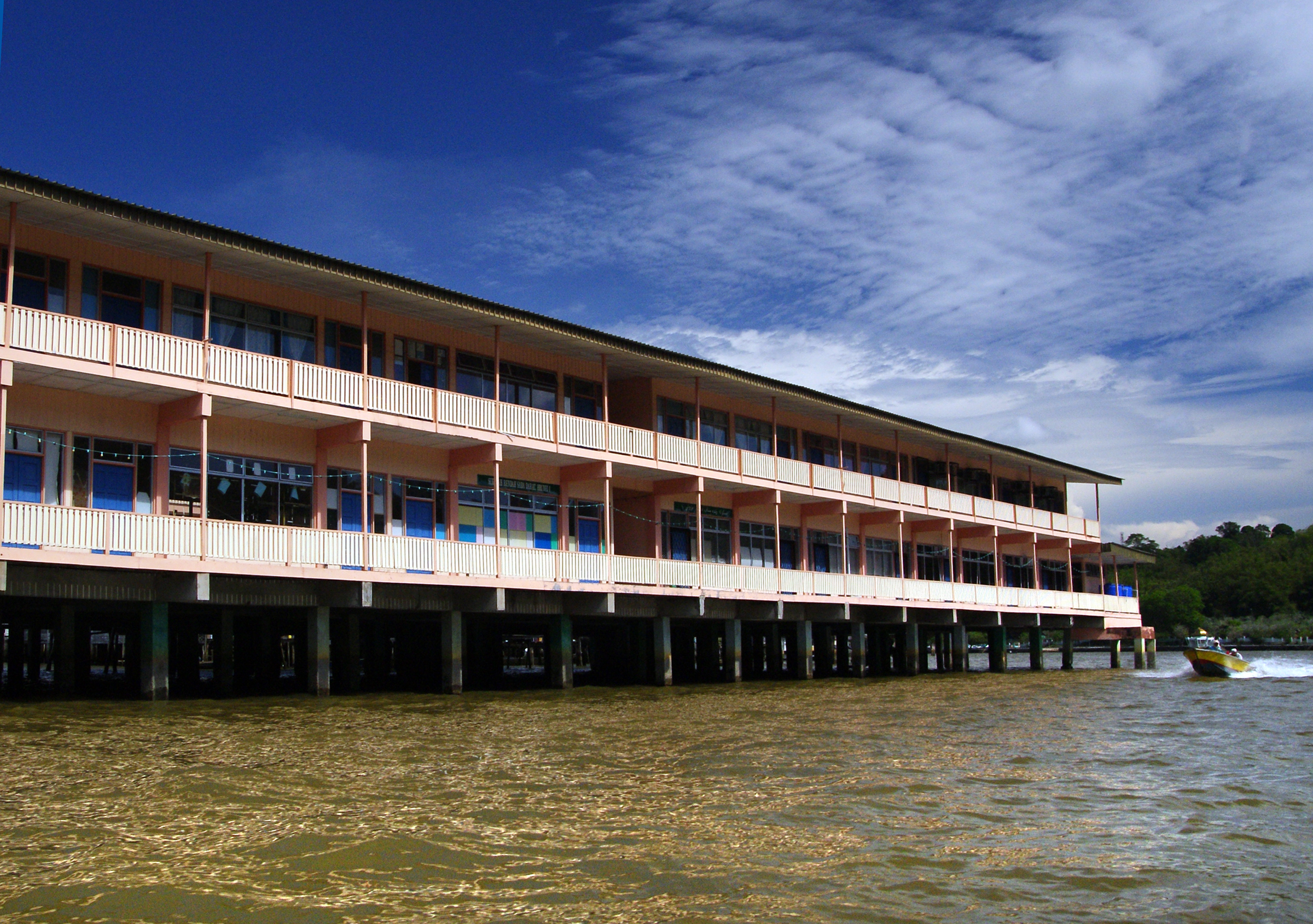
- Saba Darat Primary School

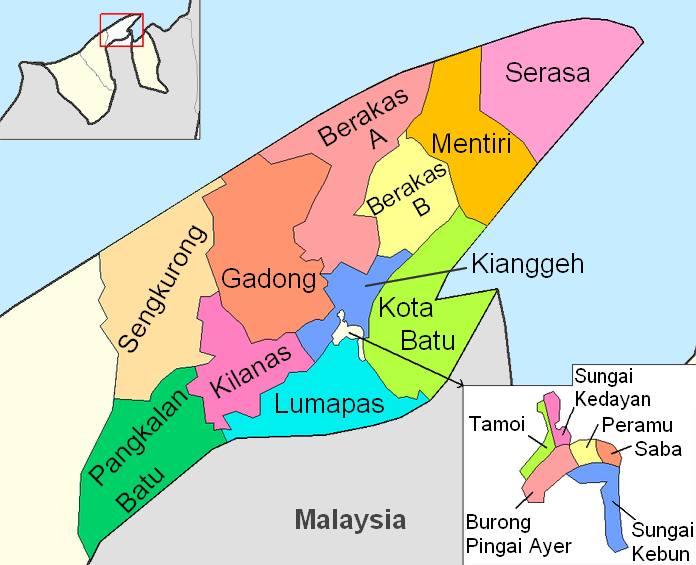
- Saba is in orange on this map of mukims of the Brunei-Muara District.
- Country: Brunei
- District: Brunei-Muara

Government
  - Penghulu: Raimi Rashid (Acting)

Population (2021)
  - Total: 827
- Time zone: UTC+8 (BNT)
- Postcode: BRxx26

Mukim Saba is a mukim (subdistrict) in Brunei-Muara District, Brunei. It is part of Kampong Ayer, the traditional stilted settlements on the Brunei River in the capital Bandar Seri Begawan. The population was 1,000 in 2016. It encompasses the village of Kampong Saba.

== Demographics ==
As of 2016 census, the population of Mukim Saba comprised 520 males and 480 females. The mukim had 144 households occupying 144 dwellings. The entire population lived in urban areas.

== Administration ==
As of 2021, the mukim comprises the following villages:

Settlements	Population (2021)	Ketua kampung (2024)
Kampong Saba Darat 'A'	251	Haji Mayalin bin Haji Saat
Kampong Saba Darat 'B'	332	Haji Mayalin bin Haji Saat
Kampong Saba Tengah	121	Haji Mayalin bin Haji Saat
Kampong Saba Ujong	39	Haji Mayalin bin Haji Saat
Kampong Saba Laut	84	Haji Mayalin bin Haji Saat

== Villages ==
=== Kampong Saba Darat 'B' ===
The origin of the name Kampong Saba is Kampung Pabalat. Kampung Pabalat was also known as Kampong Nelayan, they use balat (kilong, lintau and kabat) as fishing tools. In the beginning, Kampong Pabalat has a large area and there are many village names in it such as Kampong Padian, Kampong Peminyak, Kampong Pedaun, Kampong Perambat, Kampong Setia Pahlawan, Kampong Khatib Sulaiman, Kampong Peramu and others. It is said that when some residents ask, "Where are you going?" they will answer "Kan ke Saba ku" (Meaning they want to go to the river basin to get fish and daily necessities from the fishermen). Over time this village was called Kampung Saba. According to the village leader, SABA is also an acronym to Saya Anak Brunei Asli (I am a Native Bruneian Child). This village is no exception to the fire that made this village hold many legends, one of which is the Lela Menchanai School. This village also gave birth to many religious figures, reciters and reciters in this country. Despite that it is also claimed that the village was named after the craftsman of the village.

As of 2015, more over 800 people live in Kampong Saba Darat 'B', compared to more than 500 in Kampong Saba Darat 'A' and dwellings. While there are 55 homes in Kampung Saba Darat A, there are 84 homes in Kampong Saba Darat 'B'. Interestingly, in addition to the homes of the current people, Kampong Saba also boasts a number of contemporary homes. The majority of the residents of this community are miners, sailors, and independent contractors like cement mixers.

Saba Darat 'B' Primary School, Raja Isteri Pengiran Anak Saleha Religious School, a sepak takraw court, a surau, and a hall called Dewan Muafakat are just a few of the amenities offered in Kampung Saba Darat 'B'. The community of this hamlet also participates in local events including Dikir, Al-Quran recital, Tausyeh, Majlis Doa Arwah Semukim from house to house, and cemetery maintenance. Along with producing sweets in their homes, several people of this town also work in private industry, producing dried shrimp and other marine goods.
