= Kampong Sultan Lama =

Former village in Bandar Seri Begawan, Brunei

Kampong Sultan Lama Kampung Sultan Lama
- Village
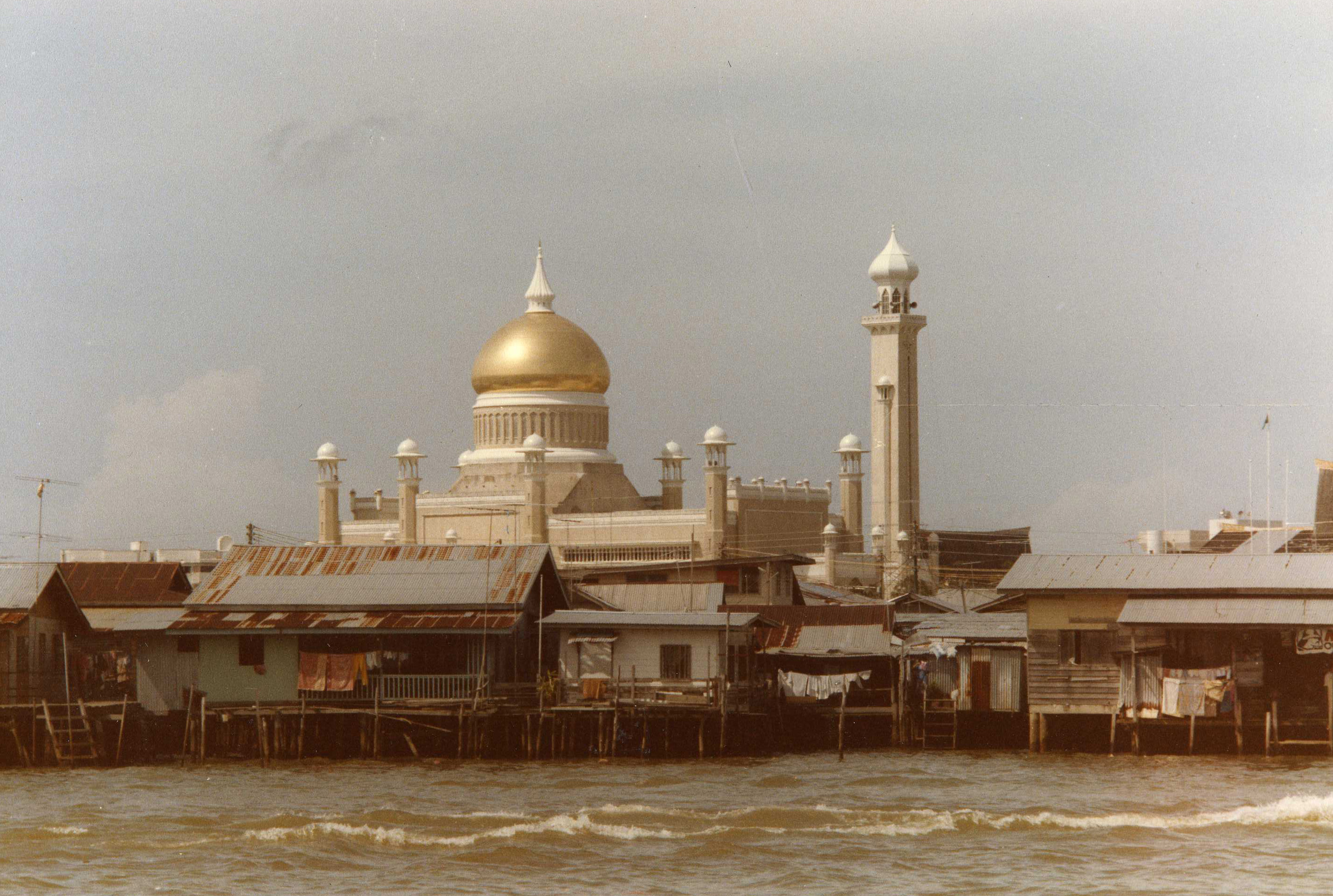
- View of the stilt houses in Kampong Sultan Lama and the Omar Ali Saifuddien Mosque from the Brunei River in 1985

- Location in Brunei
- Coordinates: 4°53′14″N 114°56′26″E
- Country: Brunei
- District: Brunei–Muara
- Mukim: Sungai Kedayan
- Planned: 1909
- First settled: 1910
- Ceased to exist: 1990s
- Named for: Sultan Hashim Jalilul Alam Aqamaddin
- Time zone: UTC+8 (BNT)

Kampong Sultan Lama (Malay: Kampung Sultan Lama) was a neighbourhood in Kampong Ayer, the riverine stilt settlement in Bandar Seri Begawan, the capital of Brunei. It was officially a village subdivision under Sungai Kedayan, a mukim (subdistrict) of Brunei–Muara District.

== Etymology ==
The Kampong Sultan Lama, translated as Old Sultan's Village, was allegedly named in honour of Sultan Hashim Jalilul Alam Aqamaddin, who ruled from 1890 to 1906. He stayed in the village's Istana Kota. The first dry-land palace was constructed in 1922 when Sultan Muhammad Jamalul Alam II made the decision to construct a brand-new palace called Istana Majlis.

== History ==
The Brunei royalty played a pivotal role in the migration from Kampong Ayer to the mainland, recognising the opportunities presented by British Resident McArthur's focus on establishing an administrative capital on land. By relocating, the royal family not only positioned themselves to benefit from development initiatives but also ensured their involvement in shaping the new administrative landscape. In 1909, when McArthur introduced a residential scheme along Sungai Tekuyung, Sumbiling, and Kampong Sultan Lama, the royal family seized the opportunity to acquire land with permanent title deeds. This strategic move allowed them to secure prime locations while opening new areas for settlement and agriculture.

The initiative to relocate Kampong Ayer residents to the mainland formally began in 1910, with McArthur initially suggesting a move to areas near the banks of the Brunei River, opposite Kampong Ayer. Later phases envisioned relocating residents to the outskirts to support agricultural development. Among the earliest migrants were members of the royal family, such as Sultan Muhammad Jamalul Alam II and his family, who settled in Kampong Sultan Lama and Kampong Kianggeh. Sultan Ahmad Tajuddin and his family moved to Kampong Berangan, while the descendants of Sultan Hashim also established themselves in Kampong Sultan Lama.

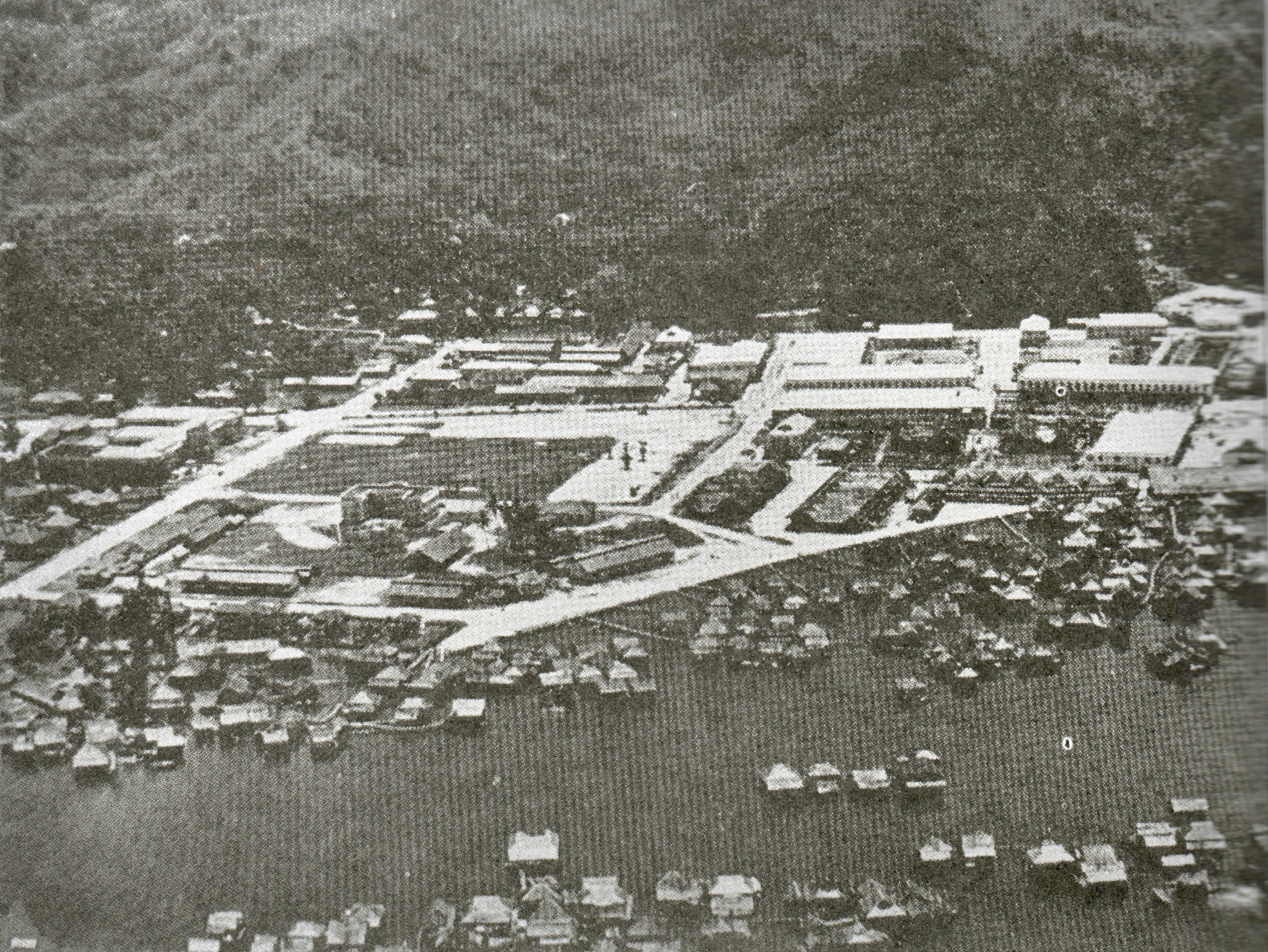
Kampong Sultan Lama on the banks of the Brunei River in 1952

Initially, the relocation plan primarily attracted interest from Pengiran families within the Brunei royal family. However, the initiative gained significant momentum in 1922 when Sultan Muhammad Jamalul Alam II relocated his palace from Kampong Sultan Lama to the mainland in Brunei Town. This landmark decision inspired many Kampong Ayer residents to embrace the resettlement effort. By the 1920s, the movement extended beyond the town centre to areas such as Tungkadeh and Kumbang Pasang, highlighting the growing interest among Kampong Ayer inhabitants in participating in this transformative scheme.

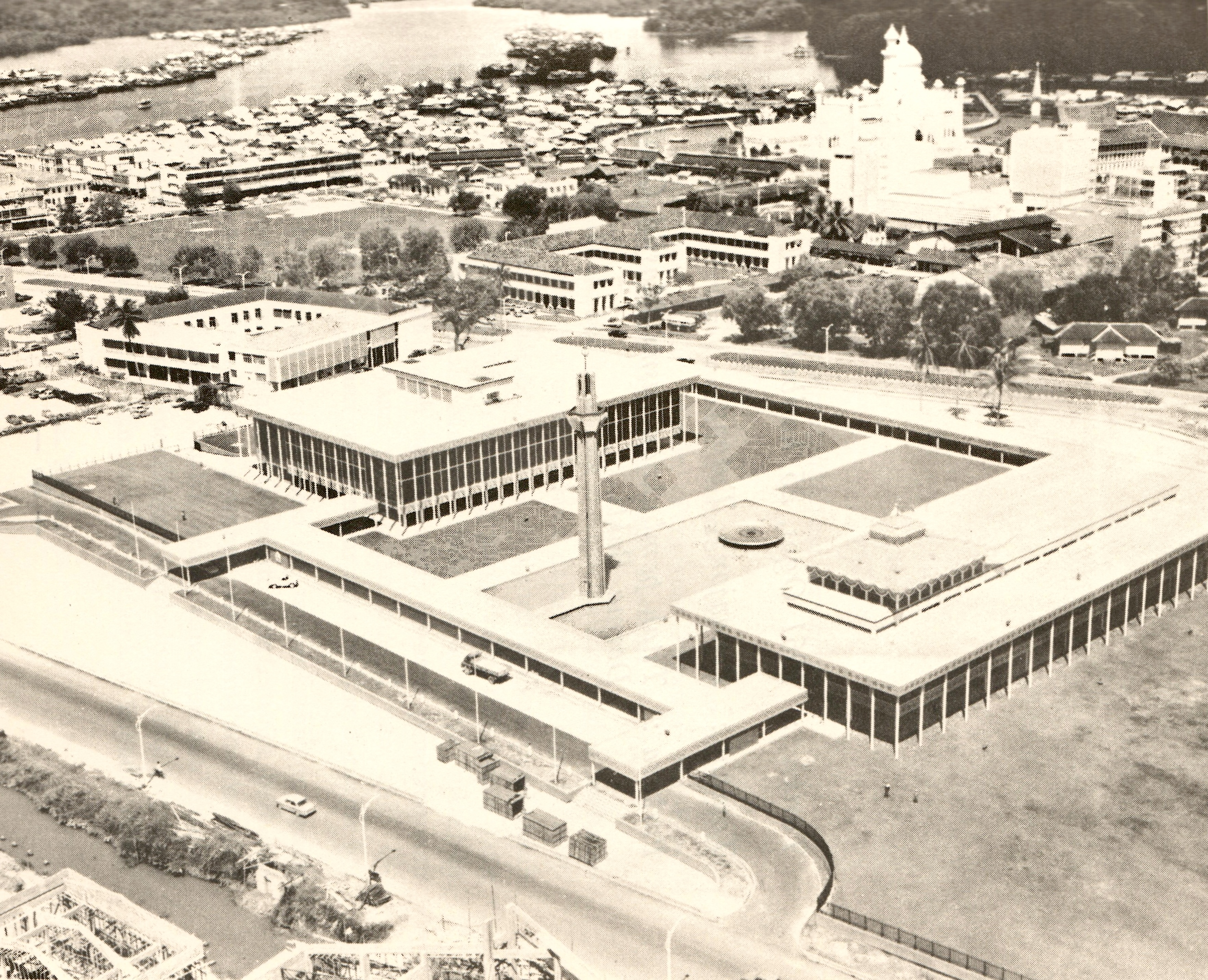
Aerial view of Brunei Town and Kampong Sultan Lama (background) in the 1960s

By the 1970s, Kampong Sultan Lama was surrounded by neighbouring villages named after Wazirs, Cheterias, and other notable dignitaries who had once resided there. These included Kampong Bendahara Lama, Kampong Pemancha Lama, Kampong Pengiran Kerma Indera Lama, and Kampong Pengiran Tajudin Hitam. Kampong Sultan Lama itself was a sizeable settlement, stretching from the current Royal Wharf to the edge of Kampong Sungai Kedayan, roughly at the midpoint of the lagoon encircling the Omar Ali Saifuddien Mosque.

In the early 20th century, fishing was the primary livelihood for most of Kampong Ayer's residents, and traditional fishing equipment remained a common household feature well into the 1970s. However, following Brunei's independence in 1984, the expansion of the public sector reshaped employment patterns and brought increased attention to the deteriorating living conditions in Kampong Ayer, which included overcrowding, poor sanitation, pollution, and frequent fire hazards. Kampong Sultan Lama, like other parts of the water village, faced considerable challenges due to devastating fires, particularly in the 1970s and 1990s. The village endured major fires in 1981 and 1990, followed by two more in September 1993, all of which caused extensive damage to its infrastructure and community. In response to these repeated calamities, the Yayasan Sultan Haji Hassanal Bolkiah (YSHHB) was established in 1992 to support affected areas, including Kampong Sultan Lama and Kampong Sungai Kedayan. As part of its efforts, YSHHB launched a housing project to provide relief and enhance living conditions for those impacted.

Eventually, Kampong Sultan Lama was demolished and levelled to make way for the YSHHB Building (Yayasan Complex). In the past, Kampong Sultan Lama and the other villages along the river's north bank occupied a much larger area. However, as part of efforts to revitalise the waterfront surrounding the Omar Ali Saifuddien Mosque, many of these villages were cleared. The Yayasan Complex, now standing on the site of a former village, features plank paths leading westward, offering visitors access to other surviving water villages. Many residents displaced by the redevelopment, including those from Kampong Sultan Lama, were relocated to Kampong Perpindahan Mata-Mata alongside communities from Kampong Sumbiling Lama, Sungai Kedayan, and Bunut. (Note: Kampong Sultan Lama residents were also relocated under a resettlement program in 1958, with many moving to the Kampong Pancha Delima area.) Efforts were made to preserve the memory of Kampong Sultan Lama, such as renaming streets after the original villages, ensuring that future generations would remain connected to their heritage.

== Infrastructure ==
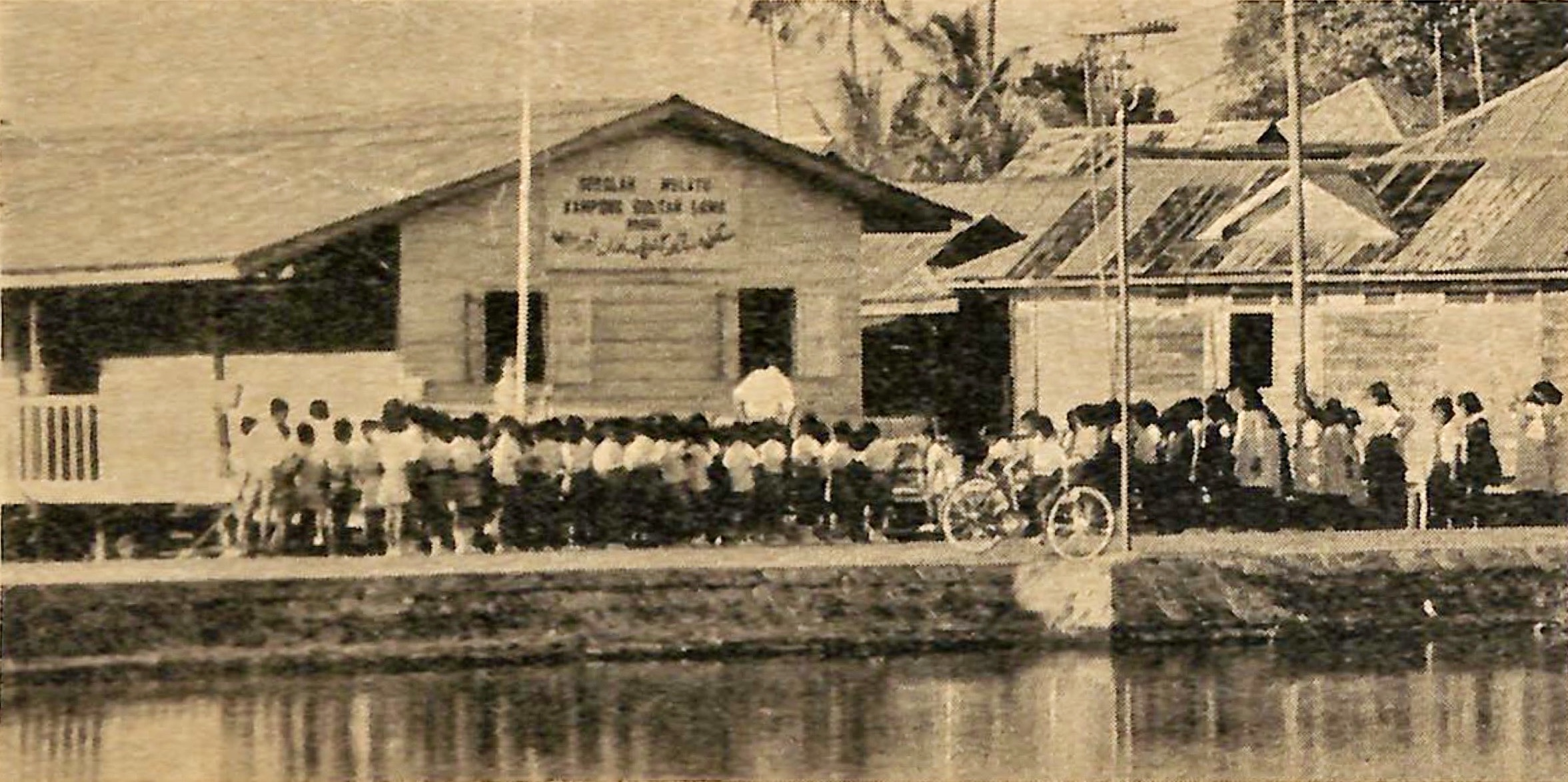
Kampong Sultan Lama Malay School in 1966

Lukan Uking presided over the formal opening of Kampong Sultan Lama Malay School on Friday morning, 9 September 1966. The school, which is next to the Omar Ali Saifuddien Mosque, was built by Kampong Sultan Lama locals with assistance from the Department of Education in a number of ways. The Kampong Sultan Lama Youth Association threw a Malam Aneka Ria (Evening of Entertainment) to commemorate the event. A colorful and unforgettable celebration for the community was created by the event's many activities, which included fashion competitions, costume contests, a drama called Menyahut Panggilan Ibu Pertiwi, singing, dancing, and comedy performances.

The Pintu Gerbang, built to commemorate the coronation of Sultan Hassanal Bolkiah on 1 August 1968, was presented by Yusof Husain. Originally located in Kampong Sultan Lama, the gateway was later relocated slightly inward in October 1993 following the construction of the YSHHB Complex.

== Notable people ==
- Pengiran Ahmad Yusof (1932–2017), nobleman and civil servant
- Omar Ali Saifuddien III (1914–1986), sultan of Brunei from 1950 to 1967

== Gallery ==
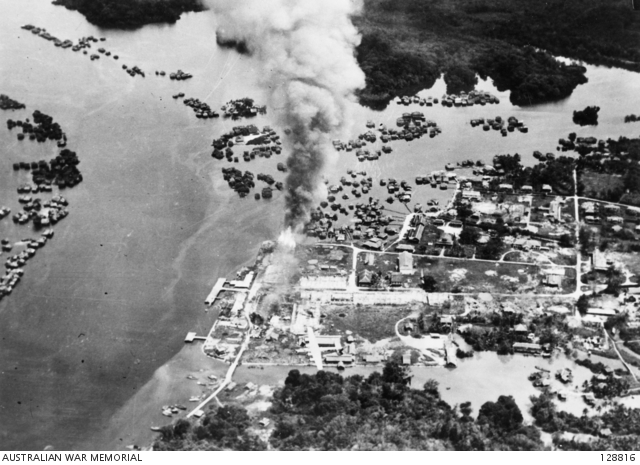
Kampong Sultan Lama and Brunei Town under Allied aerial bombardment in 1945

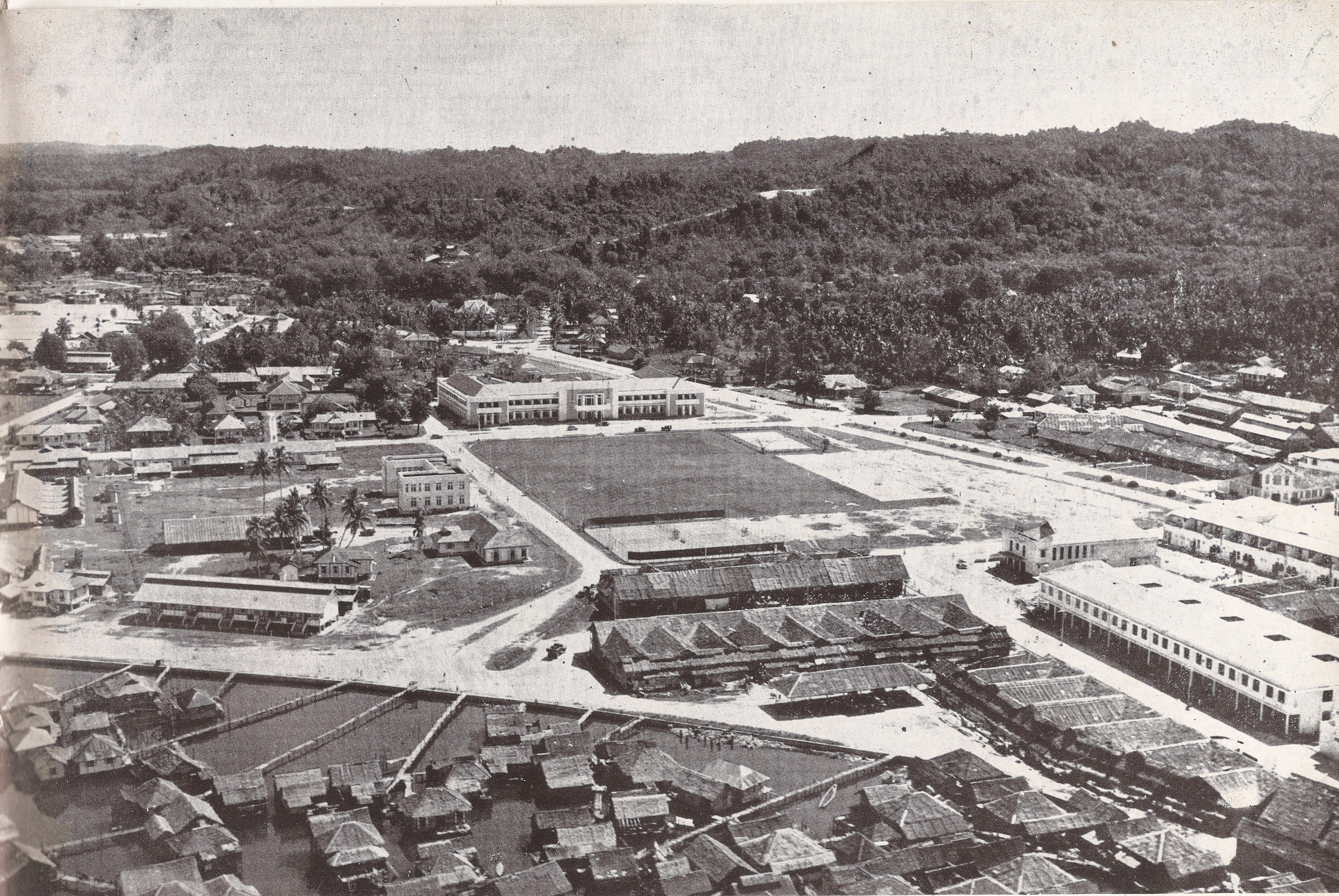
Kampong Sultan Lama (foreground) in 1950

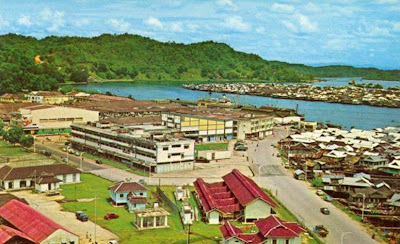
Aerial view of the city centre and Kampong Sultan Lama (right) in the 1950s

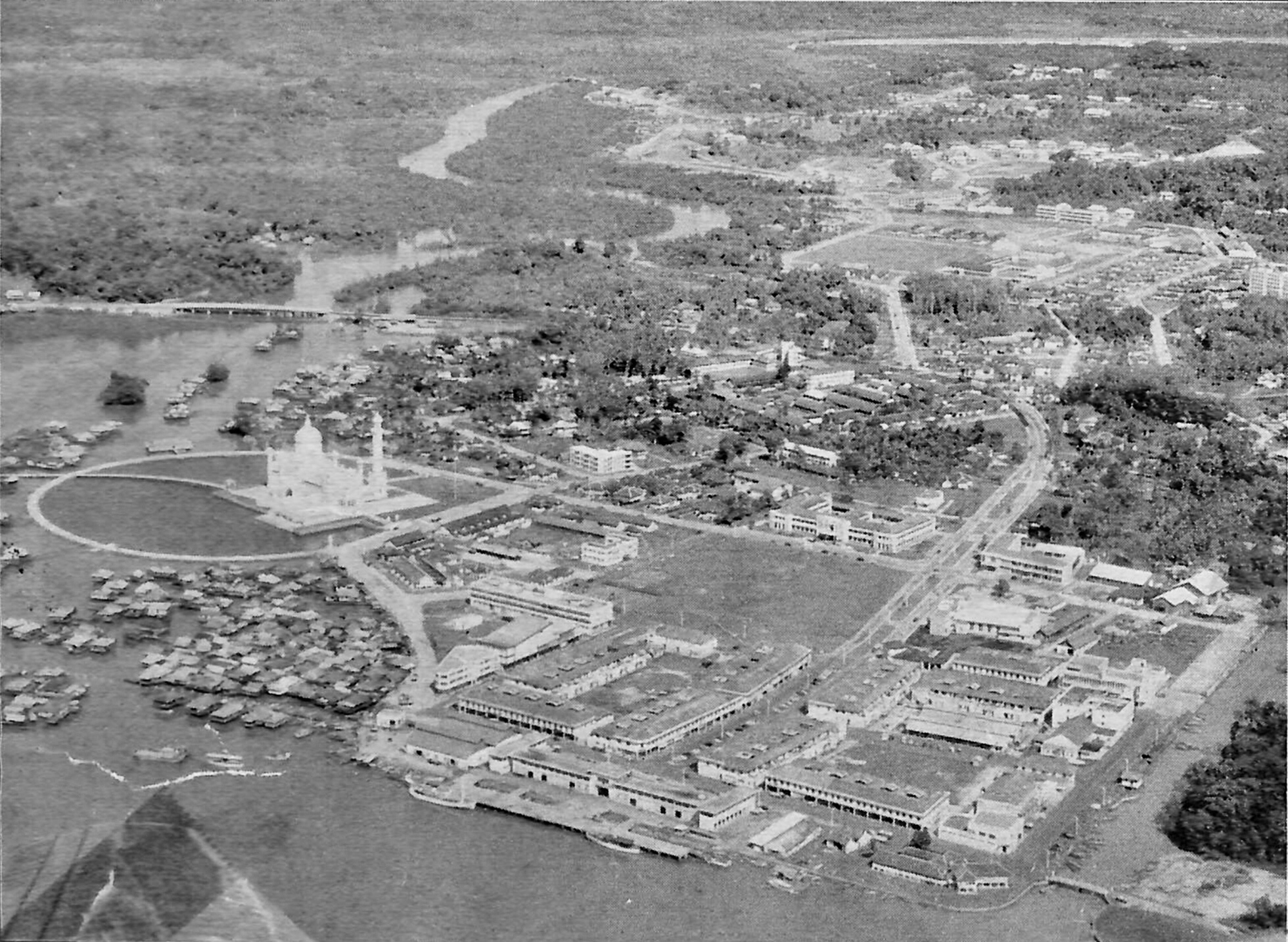
Kampong Sultan Lama (left) and the city centre in c. 1960

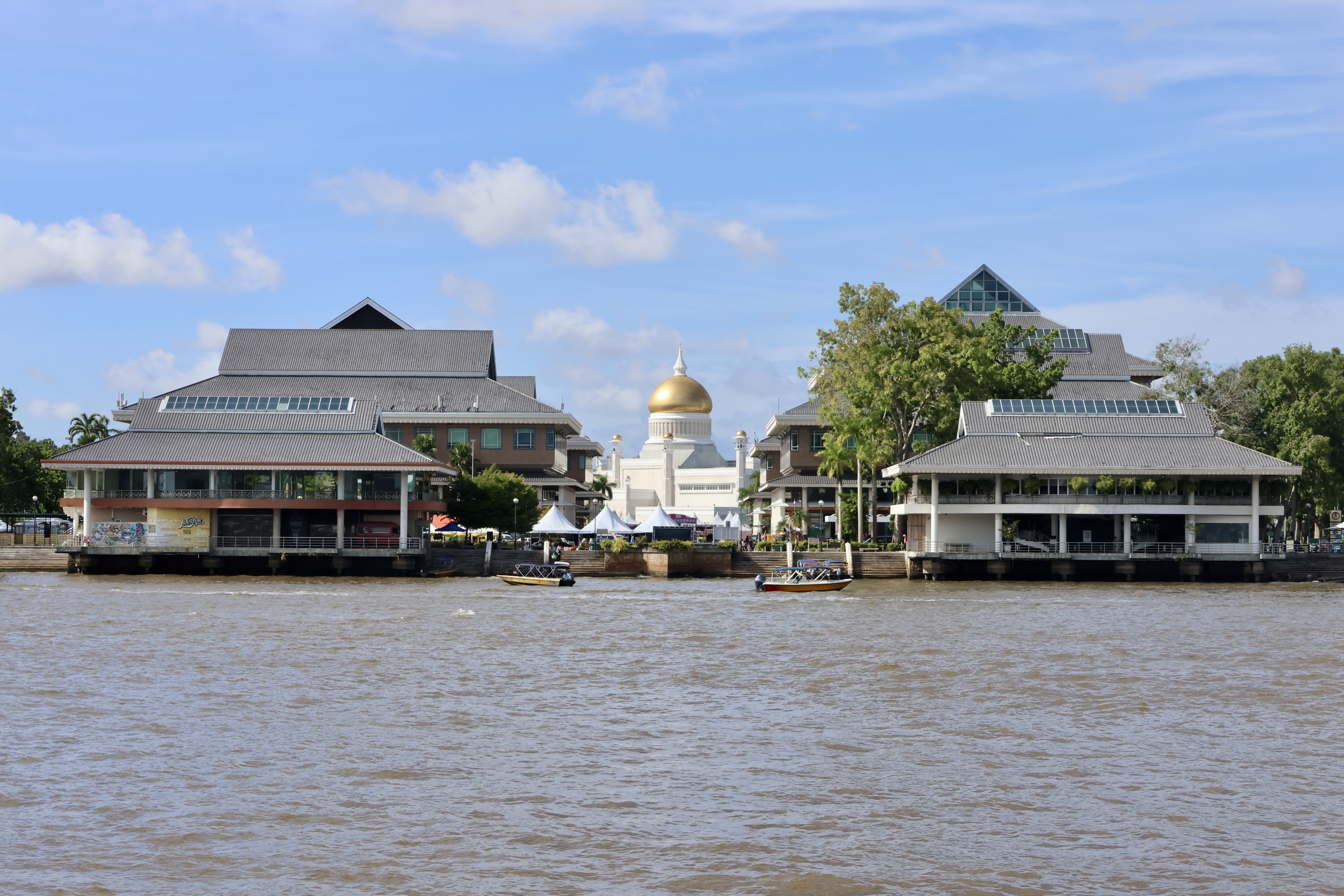
Yayasan Complex in 2023

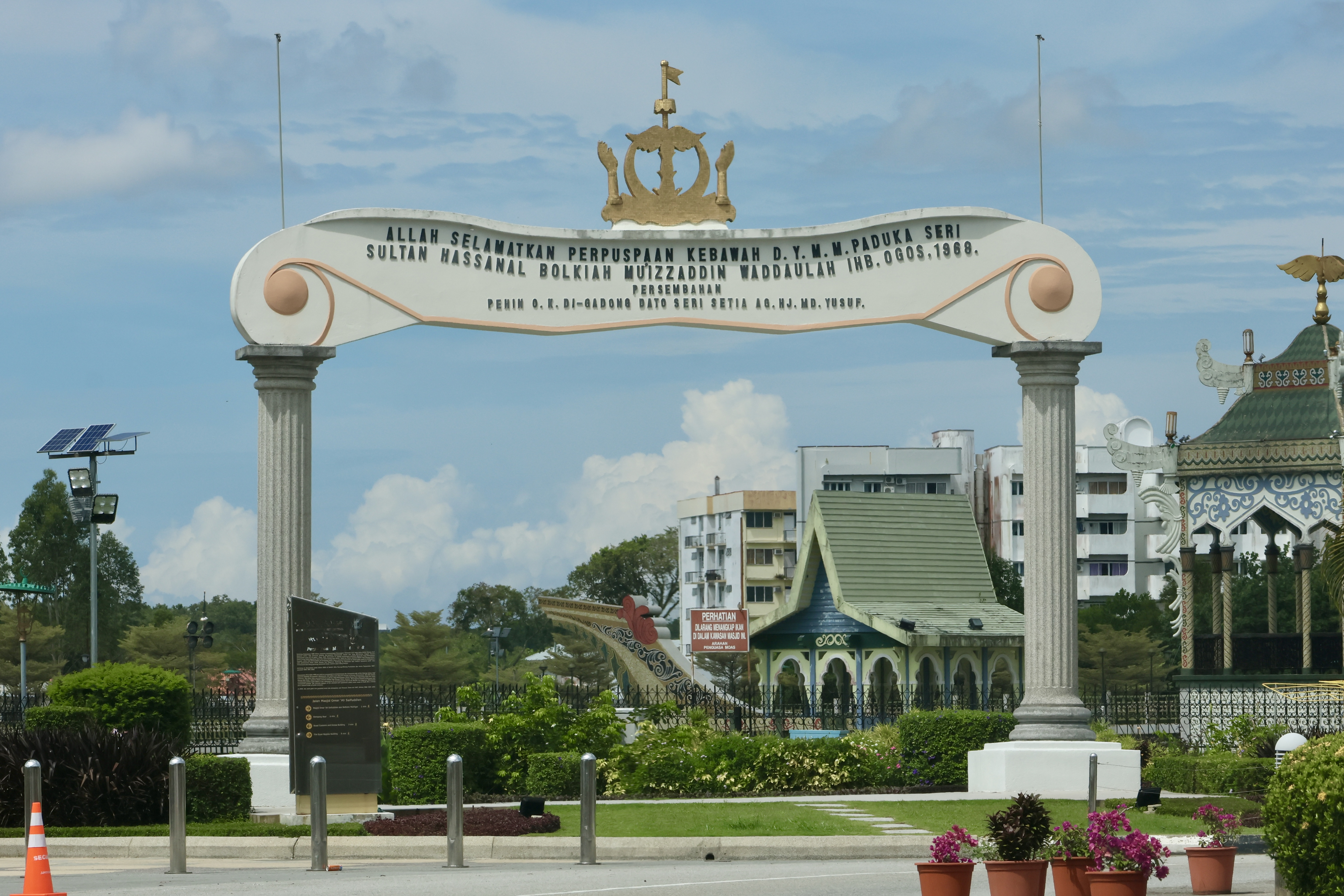
The Pintu Gerbang in 2023
