= Hashim Jalilul Alam Aqamaddin =

Sultan of Brunei from 1885 to 1906

Hashim Jalilul Alam Aqamaddin هاشم جليل العالم أقام الدين
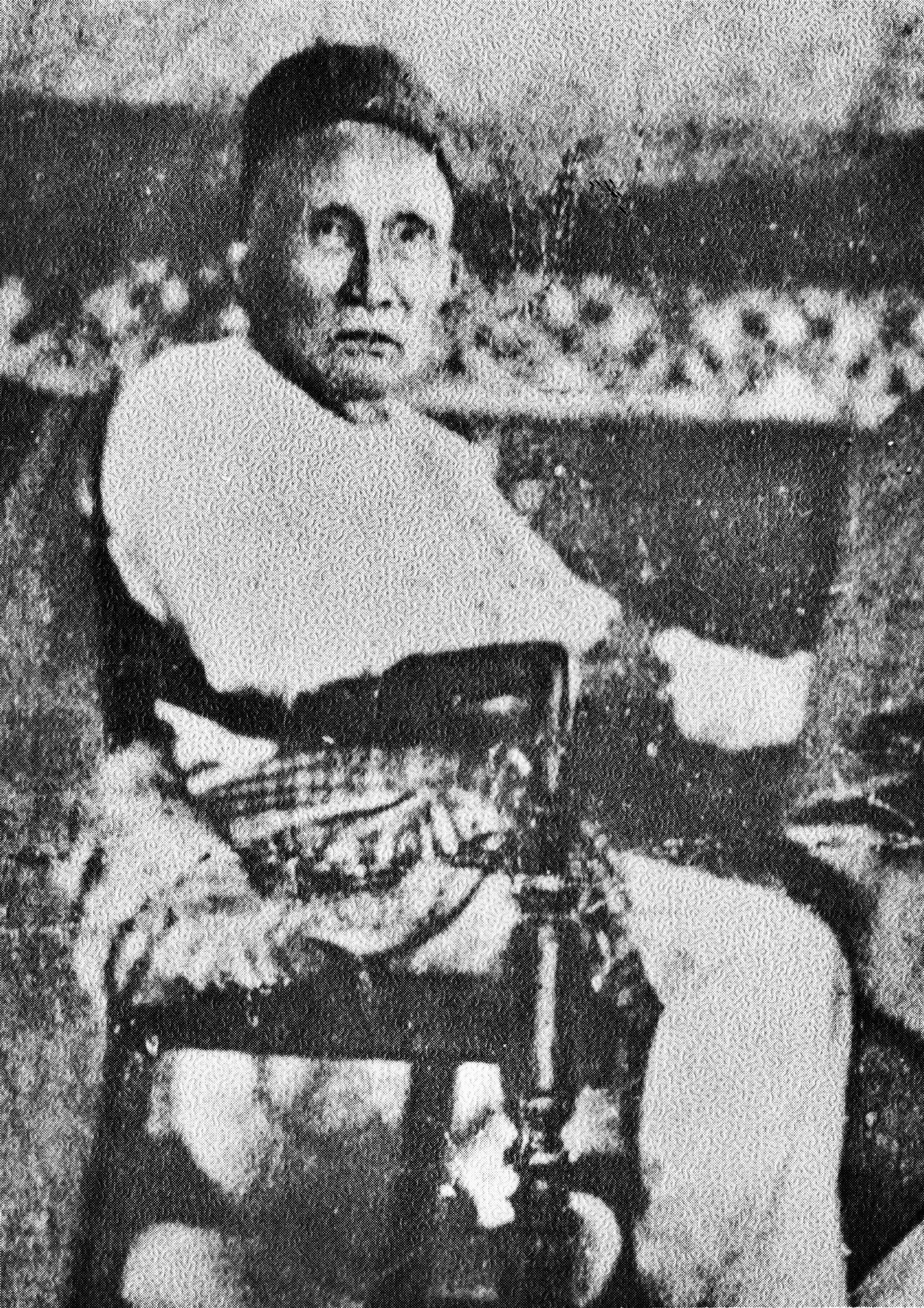
- Hashim, c. 1899

Sultan of Brunei
- Reign: 1885 – 10 May 1906
- Predecessor: Abdul Momin
- Successor: Muhammad Jamalul Alam II
- Born: 1825
- Died: 10 May 1906 (aged 80–81)
- Burial: Royal Mausoleum, Brunei
- Spouses: Pengiran Anak Siti Fatimah
- Issue: Prince Omar Ali Saifuddin; Prince Tengah; Muhammad Jamalul Alam II; Pengiran Anak Khamis; Pengiran Anak Safar; Pengiran Anak Metussin Kula
- House: Bolkiah
- Father: Omar Ali Saifuddin II
- Mother: Tuan Zaidah
- Religion: Islam

Hashim Jalilul Alam Aqamaddin (1825 – 10 May 1906) was the 25th Sultan of Brunei from 1885 until his death in 1906. Pengiran Anak Hashim or Hashim Jalilul was a prominent and controversial figure in Bruneian history. Many Western visitors' narrative painted him and his surroundings in a bad way, which was indeed consistent with the idea that Brunei was a decaying monarchy at the time.

Sultan Hashim requested British help in the late 19th century to stop Rajah Charles Brooke's territorial expansions, which resulted in the 1888 Protectorate Agreement. Aware of Brunei's request for assistance from the Ottoman Empire, the British sent Malcolm McArthur to handle matters related to governance, which resulted in the 1905–1906 Supplementary Agreement. This arrangement put Brunei's government under British control by allowing a British resident to advise the Sultan on most issues, with the exception of those pertaining to Islam and Malay customs.

== Early life ==
He was born in 1825 to Sultan Omar Ali Saifuddin II, not to a royal consort spouse, YM Puan Zaidah.

=== Betrayal of Pengiran Muda Hashim ===
Pengiran Muda Hashim, who was the uncle of Sultan Omar Ali Saifuddin II through his mother Raja Isteri Noralam, engaged in a power struggle with Pengiran Anak Hashim and his faction over the Wazir title of Pengiran Bendahara, necessary for ascending to the Brunei throne. Initially aligning with James Brooke, Pengiran Muda Hashim later sought Brooke's support to bolster his claim to the Brunei throne, further escalating tensions upon his return to Brunei and sparking conspiracies against Sultan Omar Ali Saifuddin II. By siding with Brooke, Pengiran Muda Hashim and his brothers inadvertently facilitated Brooke's access to Brunei's wealth, underestimating the complexities of Brunei's dynastic politics. These tensions within the royal family dated back to 1824, when Pengiran Muda Hashim's brother, Sultan Muhammad Alam, was assassinated. Despite the legitimacy of Pengiran Muda Hashim's claim, Brooke's involvement exacerbated the situation for his faction.

Pengiran Anak Hashim's actions in the events of 1845–1846, including the execution of Pengiran Muda Hashim and his family, led to lasting animosity within Brunei's royal circles. Despite the controversy, Pengiran Anak Hashim faced severe criticism from the British, particularly from Admiral Thomas Cochrane, who disparaged him as having a "worthless character" and linked him to piracy. This condemnation prompted direct British intervention in Brunei in 1846. However, Pengiran Anak Hashim also had supporters among British officials like Sir Spenser St. John, who viewed him as a capable and intelligent leader despite his contentious actions.

=== Rise to power and annexations ===
With Sir James Brooke's backing, Pengiran Anak Hashim's rise to prominence as Pengiran Temenggong in 1855 signalled a major rise of his authority inside the Brunei court. In an effort to repair relations with former opponents, he set up a calculated marital alliance by having his daughter wed Pengiran Anak Besar, the son of Pengiran Tajuddin, who had been killed in the massacre of 1845–1846, in 1846. The foundation for his future claim to the throne following Sultan Abdul Momin's rule was laid by this marriage, which enhanced his political status and maintained a balance of power within Brunei's royal hierarchy.

Charles Lee Moses became the first American consul general in Brunei in 1864. Moses's assurances of economic advantages and American protection won Sultan Abdul Momin over, and he consented to have a consulate built for him. Moses was able to persuade the Sultan to grant a ten-year lease to practically all of North Borneo, including its twenty-one districts and territories, in exchange for $4,500 a year in payments to the Sultan, plus an additional $4,000 from Pengiran Temenggong Pengiran Anak Hashim.

In response to Brooke's attempts to conquer Brunei holdings, the British government backed the British North Borneo Company (BNBC) in its efforts to take further territory from Brunei. Peter Leys, the British Consul General, put diplomatic demands on Sultan Abdul Momin in 1882 to give Sarawak ownership of Baram. Conceding that more fight would be ineffective, the Sultan gave up, causing Brunei to lose Suai, Niah, Sibuti, and Bakong in exchange for a yearly salary of $3,000 and cession payments of $2,000 to Pengiran Temenggong Anak Hashim and two other Pengirans.

The BNBC was actively pursuing new regions not included in the original lease, putting Brunei in danger of going extinct. Pengiran Temenggong Anak Hashim rashly gave Sarawak Trusan and Limbang without the Sultan's consent in 1884, when the company leased the Padas area for $3,000 a year. This made the leases worthless officially. The Sultan realised that immediate action was required to protect Brunei since he was extremely concerned about its existence.

To stop Brunei's land from becoming further alienated, Sultan Abdul Momin called a gathering of his leaders in 1885. Aware of his advanced age and abiding by his religious obligation, he gave the chiefs his parting counsel (nasihat) and required them to swear an oath (Amanat or Umanat) to keep no more Brunei regions from coming under foreign control.

== Reign ==
=== Accession ===
After 33 years as Brunei's ruler, Abdul Momin died on 15 September 1885. On the following evening, his brother-in-law, Pengiran Temenggong Pengiran Anak Hashim, was sworn in as Sultan Hashim Jalilul Alam Aqamaddin during his funeral. Abdul Momin's coffin was taken from the palace to the Lapau, a ceremonial hall, and set in front of the throne. Pengiran Bendahara invited Pengiran Temenggong to stand next to his father's body, and the accession ceremony got underway right away. He was given the royal dagger, Keris Si Naga, and a seven-time tribute rite was conducted as the nobat was played. Subsequently, the Pengiran Bendahara declared Hashim as the new sultan.

The Nobat Ibrahim was performed during the procession that took Abdul Momin's casket to the royal cemetery for burial after his ascension. Various dignitaries attended religious readings and recitations at the palace in the days after the latter's passing. Hashim was installed before to the burial, and the rites followed customary procedures as described in ancient documents. Following 40 days of mourning, the celebrations concluded with a feast, when Hashim received further regalia to better cement his status as the new sultan. The entire procedure followed accepted practices, demonstrating the importance of the enthronement and funeral ceremonies in Brunei's royal customs.

=== Coronation ===
According to the Kitab Risalat Al-Marhum Fi-Adati L-Marhum, the ceremonial customs set up during the previous coronation of Sultan Muhammad Hasan were carefully adhered to during the coronation of Sultan Hashim. He sat on the tanglung on the pataratna (the throne), at the Lapau, where the ceremony was held. With him wearing a crown and accompanied by dignitaries such as the Pehin Orang Kaya Di-Gadong, Pengiran Bendahara, and Pengiran Pemancha, the ceremony got underway. The awarding of several traditional titles to ministers was a noteworthy feature of the coronation, particularly the resuscitation of the Pengiran Pemancha Sahibul Rae Wal-Mashuarah, which highlighted the Wazir's significance in the court. He received seven acts of tribute (sembah) at the ritual, expressing allegiance to and reverence for the monarch.

The coronation's framework was identical to that of Muhammad Hasan's, including similar customs like the nobat's ceremonial music and the drawing of swords (menghunus). Pehin Orang Kaya Di-Gadong symbolised the solemnity and severity of the ceremony by stomping his foot on the Lapau's floor during the tribute. All things considered, the coronation demonstrated the continuity and importance of Brunei's traditions, not only commemorating Hashim's succession but also reaffirming the country's rich cultural legacy and ceremonial customs.

=== Limbang dispute ===
Upon his ascension to the throne, he decided not to appoint a replacement for his previous position in office of Pengiran Temenggong which left three other Wazirs, thus improving his income and finances. The Amanat was of great assistance to Sultan Hashim Jalilul Alam, who, in spite of his prior violations, took action to protect Brunei's surviving areas upon his coronation in 1885. To maintain the state against formidable foreign and internal obstacles, he used Brunei's age-old tactic of pushing opponents on one another.

He faced a challenge from the British North Borneo Company (BNBC) and the Brooke government (White Rajahs) in Sarawak who wanted more land from Brunei and it was not strong enough to stop the land grabs. In the hopes of improving the relations between the Sultan and the White Rajahs to settle the conflict in Limbang, he leased the settlement of Punang Terusan to Sarawak in 1885. Unfortunately in November of that same year, tensions would rise again in Limbang after the murders of multiple Bruneian Malays. The two alleged culprits were offered to be handed over to the Sultan but later declined as they were not the guilty parties. Due to his decision, the people of Limbang protested and refused to pay their taxes in which was taken advantage of by both the British Consul General Peter Leys and Rajah Charles Brooke. The Sultan eventually agreed to lease Limbang for 6,000 Sarawak dollars per year.

The British government agreed to the White Rajahs' persuasive thesis in that same year, thus Limbang came into Sarawak's rule after arguing that the Sultan no longer has the ability to govern the colony. In November 1886, Wazirs and people of Brunei Town demanded that Limbang to be returned to Brunei with the slogan of "Brunei is the spirit of Limbang and Limbang is the (physical) body of Brunei". The demand was motivated by Abdul Momin's Amanat. In 1887, he wrote to the British Crown with the intention of requesting a British Resident to be put in place. That same year, Padas-Damit was also among the areas annexed. Sultan Hashim made a minor change in Brunei's coinage with the introduction of the copper one cent in 1887.

=== Protectorate Agreement of 1888 ===
Britain's worries about the German Empire and the United States, among other Western countries, remained three decades later. In an effort to establish a more stable sphere of influence, Britain looked for further protections encompassing North Borneo, Sarawak, and Brunei. In 1887, Sultan Hashim was given assurances of security by Lord Salisbury. As a result, on 17 September 1888, Brunei, Sarawak, and North Borneo signed a Protectorate Agreement with the British government, which marked yet another important turning point in Brunei's history.

Sultan Hashim signed the Treaty of Protection with Sir Hugh Low of Great Britain to prevent further loss of Bruneian territories. The treaty handed the country's foreign affairs over to Great Britain. The agreement prevented Brunei from engaging in direct negotiations with Sarawak and North Borneo, which were once dependent countries but now needed to be mediated via Brunei government. Second, the British government was to make the ultimate decisions to settle any disagreements.

Just two years after the Agreement was made, in March 1890, Brooke seized Limbang, which turned this arrangement into a significant defeat for Brunei. The British Foreign Office (FO) approved the annexation despite Brunei's protests and its geographical and economic concerns, creating a pattern that was hard to reverse. Brunei's sovereignty was seriously undermined and essentially divided the country into two separate enclaves.

The Protectorate Agreement of 1888, aimed at safeguarding Brunei, proved ineffective in preventing further territorial encroachments. Britain's flexible interpretation of the agreement allowed it autonomy in managing Brunei's affairs, including decisions on territorial disputes, prioritising geopolitical interests over Brunei's sovereignty. Externally, Brunei faced imminent threats as the British Foreign Office considered dividing its remaining lands between Brooke and the BNBC. Internally, economic challenges, Brooke's destabilisation efforts for Tutong and Belait, and treason among Brunei's nobility further weakened the kingdom. Sultan Hashim, disillusioned by Britain's actions, expressed his dismay to King Edward VII in 1902, highlighting Brunei's vulnerable state. He wrote the King a letter saying:

From the day I set my hand to the Treaty of Protection [17 September 1888], I have not once received assistance or protection from Your Majesty’s Government and I beg, with all deference, for your Majesty’s help. Not a single Consul has done anything to help strengthen my country. They all seem to help Sarawak and to try to hand over my country to Sarawak.

— Sultan Hashim Jalilul Alam Aqamaddin, 1902

Without a doubt, Brunei experienced intense foreign pressure as well as domestic turmoil at this crucial time. After the Tutong–Belait uprising of 1899, the British government, unconcerned with Brunei's existence, considered dividing it between Brooke and the BNBC. Surprisingly, Sir Alexander Swettenham was sent to mediate this breakup, avoided bringing up the subject with Sultan Hashim and possibly out of respect for the Sultan and disapproval for Brooke's power.

=== Continued struggle against colonialism ===
By early 1901, violence erupted once again in Tutong, prompting the FO to reassess its strategy in resolving the Brunei dispute amidst escalating tensions. This crisis served as the final blow in the gradual dismantling of the sultanate, viewed by many in British circles through a lens heavily influenced by pro-Brooke perspectives. Criticisms emerged, including local preferences for Sarawak's governance due to perceived fairer taxation, Brunei's diminished territory post-Limbang being deemed unproductive and better managed by Sarawak, and concerns over governance issues raised by Chinese traders in Brunei Town. These perceptions painted Brunei as politically unstable and economically weak, casting doubt on Sultan Hashim's leadership and the kingdom's future prospects. Despite facing unjust accusations stemming from past mistakes and resisting British influence, Sultan Hashim steadfastly defended Brunei's independence amid financial pressures on the royal family, exacerbated by historical errors like involving James Brooke.

In 1901, Sultan Hashim's financial situation had deteriorated to the point where he borrowed $10,000 from Brooke to meet urgent household expenses. During this period, a royal wedding took place, marked by a year-long celebration as Sultan's favourite grandson, Pengiran Muda Tajuddin, married the daughter of his adversary, Pengiran Bendahara Pengiran Anak Besar, in a grand ceremony aimed at solidifying political alliances. In 1902, Brooke and Hewett asked him to cede Belait and Tutong to them but he refused and said, "What would happen to me, my chiefs and my descendants? I should be left like a tree, stripped of branches and twigs." They also offered 8,000 Sarawak dollars to the Sultan to lease both Tutong and Belait Rivers.

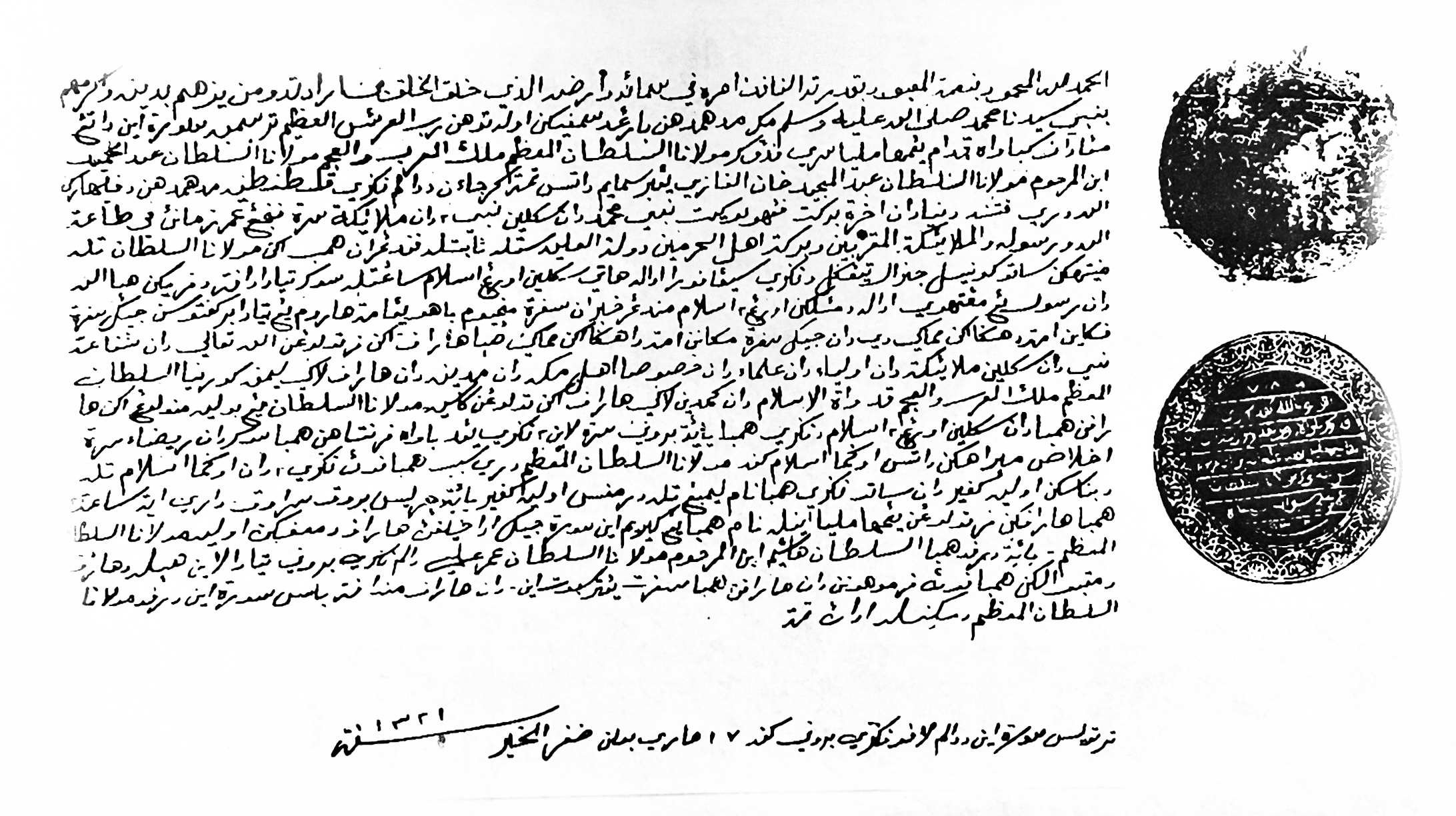
Confiscated letter written by Hashim to Abdul Hamid in 1890

In a 1903 letter to Sultan Abdul Hamid II of the Ottoman Empire, sent through the Turkish Consul General in Singapore, Sultan Hashim expressed his intense dissatisfaction with Brunei's British rule and his readiness to cede the kingdom to Turkey because of what he saw as the mistreatment of Islam and the loss of Limbang to Sarawak's Brooke. The letter was discovered later and confiscated by Hewett. Upon reading the letter, Hewett became enraged by the Sultan's baseless charges against the British. The High Commissioner in Malaya, Sir Frank Swettenham, chose to completely dismiss the incident rather than take it further despite its controversial nature.

Tragedy struck in 1904 when a smallpox epidemic claimed the lives of the newlywed couple and their infant, dashing hopes of reconciliation between the Sultan and his Pengiran Bendahara. As a final attempt to facilitate the transfer of Brunei to Sarawak's ownership, the FO proposed that Brooke increase his compensation offer to the Brunei palace and settle the outstanding cession money for the Limbang territory. Brooke's refusal, citing Sarawak's financial constraints, led to the recall of the controversial Consul Hewett to London in 1904.

Sultan Hashim steadfastly resisted giving up Brunei or compromising his dynasty despite severe economic decline following the loss of Limbang. The majority of Brunei's sago industries had shut down by 1903, leaving just a small 300-person cutch operation on Kampong Ayer's banks. The Sultan trusted Edmund Roberts, who was plotting against him although pretending to be loyal, and he was given the title of Dato to serve as an advisor in Brunei's State Council. Hashim expressed deep dissatisfaction with British consuls like G. Hewett, accusing them of favoring Brooke's interests and Sarawak's takeover. He rejected Hewett's attempts at gunboat diplomacy and refused monetary offers for Brunei's remaining territories, emphasising his commitment to Brunei's national security over personal gain.

In the end, Sultan Hashim's unwavering opposition succeeded in preserving both Brunei's sovereignty and its royal lineage. Prominent British individuals like as C. P. Lucas and Governor E. W. Birch were against the Sarawak alternative and in favor of a British Resident supervising Brunei's governance. Plans to move Brunei to Sarawak sparked worries from The Straits Times, and in 1903, Consul Hewett unintentionally brought Brunei's oil deposits to the notice of the British. Because it was not in constant communication and only made occasional trips to Brunei, the Labuan-based British Consulate system had proven unable to keep an eye on the country. Sultan Hashim became increasingly aggressive in his interactions with the British Government and began to regard British Consuls as rivals as a result of this impersonal approach, which stood in stark contrast to the friendly connections observed in Malaya.

=== Malcolm McArthur's arrival and report ===
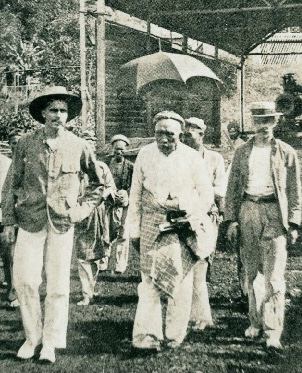
In the presence of Dato Edmund Roberts, the plant manager, Hashim visited the cutch factory on the banks of Kampung Ayer in c. 1902

Malcolm McArthur during Brunei's turbulent 1904 period, becoming became a crucial character in the sultanate's survival. Sarawak's chiefs were taken aback when McArthur arrived in Brunei in May 1904; they had anticipated Brunei's easy annexation. Brooke's hopes of incorporating the remaining parts of Brunei were blocked when McArthur's expedition exposed an alternative situation. Brooke's dreams of becoming a great man were destroyed by McArthur's prompt steps and the upcoming report. Although Brooke was sceptical of McArthur's assessment's quickness, McArthur finished the job in just three months, which marked a major change in Brunei's future and British policy.

McArthur's original three-month mission in Brunei was prolonged by unanticipated events, namely the smallpox epidemic that occurred in June–August 1904. Sultan Hashim was struck, upon McArthur's arrival, by his friendliness and kindness of spirit, which distinguished him much from past encounters with British officials. McArthur's choice to stay longer in Brunei helped him establish a close relationship with the Sultan, who valued his attempts to learn about the palace and its populace. Their relationship became so close that, in sharp contrast to his earlier petitions against previous British Consuls, the Sultan personally supported McArthur's appointment as Brunei's first British Resident following the Treaty's signature.

Compared to earlier British officials, McArthur's extensive fact-finding trip in Brunei uncovered a radically different viewpoint. McArthur had a more tolerant perspective of Sultan Hashim in contrast to the negative opinions of his predecessors, such as Hewett, who condemned the Sultan for allegedly unfulfilled pledges and lawlessness. The Sultan was seen by him as honourable but also rather oblivious to outside events, frequently surrounded by advisors, and reluctant to assume accountability. McArthur observed Sultan Hashim's frequent isolation in his palace and his reliance on rumours to learn about the outside world.

When McArthur heard about Sultan Hashim's letter to Sultan Abdul Hamid II, he responded to it not with criticism but with sympathy. McArthur thought the Sultan's actions were unfair because he felt abandoned and abused by the British, which drove him to act in desperation. McArthur noted that the Sultan's brutal treatment at the hands of the British was a major contributing factor to his seeming disobedience of treaty duties. In spite of this, McArthur also pointed out, with a laugh, how ironic Sultan Hashim's goals were in light of Brunei's unstable situation. Instead of going into further detail, he offered a more nuanced assessment of the circumstances underlying Sultan Hashim's behaviour and emotions.

=== 1905–1906 Supplementary Treaty ===
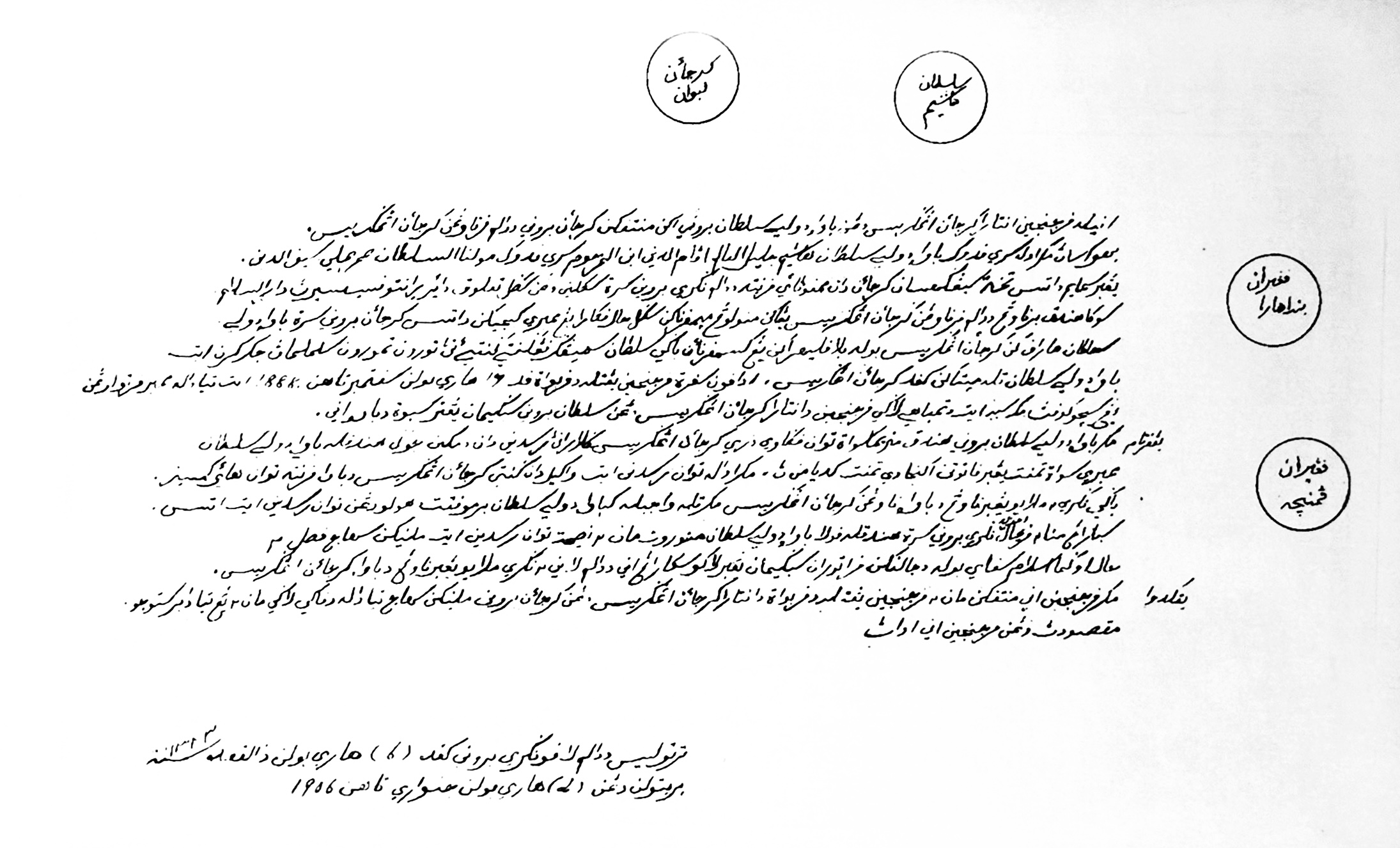
Supplementary Treaty between Brunei and Great Britain

McArthur believed and advised that a British Residency system should be implemented, an idea which Sultan Hashim himself had approved. The 1905–1906 Supplementary Treaty was signed by Brunei's the Sultan and his Wazirs in late 1905. It was completed with the arrival of Sir John Anderson, the High Commissioner in Malaya, in January 1906. Anderson stressed the need of leading for Brunei's future and hailed McArthur as a reliable ally of the Malays. During the event, Sultan Hashim expressed his relief and reaffirmed his commitment. The Sultan and his advisors were satisfied with Anderson's guarantees on the status of Islam in Brunei as stipulated in the treaty. This event demonstrated Sultan Hashim's attempts to protect Brunei's sovereignty through international accords and strategic alliances, and it represented an important diplomatic victory.

Brunei's Wazirs lost much of their traditional authority under British rule, especially as a result of land reforms that denied them basic means of subsistence. As a result, their influence and patronage declined. Following 1906, the Sultan's status among his ministers and his symbolic position as head of state were enhanced, even if his direct political authority declined in comparison to the British Resident's all-encompassing control over the administrative, judicial, and legislative branches of government. A major change from the Sultan's power in the 19th century to British supervision in Brunei's administration occurred when the British Resident essentially took on the role of the government.

The British Resident only gain more power after the instalment of the British Residency in the Supplementary Agreement of 1905/1906. Tho Brunei came under British protectorate, the last territory to be annexed was the Pandaruan District in 1890, with no actions taken by the British. Sultan Hashim's final stand opposing British and Brooke's ambitions came in and strengthened his determination. With the loss of eighteen regions by 1904, the Sultan was left with just four rivers. Due to their importance for the manufacture of antimony in Sarawak, sago in Mukah, and subsistence in Limbang, these lands were lost, plunging Brunei into extreme poverty and having an impact on both the palace and the populace.

After Brunei signed the treaty, which made the sultanate a British shade, it was deemed of interest that they should have their own national flag like other countries. Design proposals were made and eventually agreed upon that the design of the flag would be based on the yellow and the irregular colours of white and black. All of these colours have their own symbolic meanings, yellow being the symbol for the Sultan, white being the symbol for the Pengiran Bendahara, and black being the symbol for the Pengiran Pemancha.

== Death ==
Following Sultan Hashim's death on 10 May 1906, Pengiran Muda Bongsu Muhammad Jamalul Alam II, the 17-year-old son, assumed the role of Sultan of Brunei. The young Sultan's age meant that Pengiran Bendahara and Pengiran Pemancha, who were older, took on regent duties. In July of that year, Sultan Muhammad Jamalul Alam II petitioned the British High Commissioner to amend the modifications made to Brunei's traditional administration by the British Resident, perhaps under the influence of Pengiran Bendahara and his allies.

Sultan Hashim is buried at the Royal Mausoleum in Brunei Town, alongside his father, Omar Ali Saifuddin II. Towards the end of his life, the Sultan was noted to be "unwilling to trust any of his chiefs." Till his death, he refused to sanction Limbang and pleaded to the British government to return it back to Brunei.

== Personal life ==
He met Malcolm McArthur in 1904, when he was believed to be in his 70s by the latter, although he claimed to be in his 80s. By that time, he was characterised as weak and elderly. He had clearly been worn out during his reign due to his elderly age and the strain of statecraft over time.

He married into an anti-Western party in the Brunei royal through the daughter of Pengiran Anak Muhammad Yusuf (known as Usop). He was married twice and with the notable being Pengiran Isteri Pengiran Siti Fatimah as she gave birth to Hashim's successor Muhammad Jamalul Alam II. It was said that the Sultan had well more than 100 sons and daughters, along with around 30 concubines. Notable issues are:

- Crown Prince Omar Ali Saifuddin (died 25 June 1905), married Pengiran Anak Siti Khadija
- Prince Tengah (died 1905)
- Sultan Muhammad Jamalul Alam II (1889 – 11 September 1924), 26th Sultan of Brunei
- Pengiran Anak Khamis (died 1986), member of the Privy Council and wazir from 1971 to 1975
- Pengiran Anak Safar (died 1964), member of the Privy Council
- Pengiran Anak Metussin Kula

== Legacy ==
=== Reputation ===
Pengiran Anak Hashim had an assortment of personalities who could be both diplomatic and combative when necessary. According to British sources, he was cunning and tenacious, with strong nationalist feelings and a deep-seated resentment of British imperial officials, especially after the Brookes' deeds. Even though he was hostile to Britain, he saw that going up against colonial powers directly would be pointless. He took part in proxy wars in the 1840s, destroying a second powerful line of Bruneian royalty that was backed by James Brooke and Britain.

When Sultan Hashim served as Pengiran Temenggong under Sultan Abdul Momin, he was criticised for his part in the surrender of important lands. Even with his remorse and the Amanat he swore when he became Sultan in 1885, he was finally defeated by James Brooke by direct assault for Limbang. Sultan Hashim's resistance to Brooke's intrusions during this defeat cemented his image as a strong leader who could withstand outside pressure. He later saved Brunei through the 1905–1906 Supplementary Agreement, which helped the sultanate withstand external and internal challenges. This agreement led to the establishment of the British Residency in 1906, marking the beginning of an official British presence in Brunei.

As Sultan, Hashim experienced a great deal of loneliness and mental strain. Prominent ministers such as Pengiran Bendahara Pengiran Anak Besar, Pengiran Di-Gadong Pengiran Matassan and Pengiran Pemancha Pengiran Muhd Salleh did not always back him, probably because of old grudges and the intricate dynamics of Brunei's court politics. Complex ties within the kingdom were further compounded by Sultan Hashim's role in the killings of the fathers of Pengiran Bendahara and Pengiran Pemancha during the power grab of 1845–1846. The Sultan's tenure was characterised by mistrust and isolation at the conclusion of his reign.

=== Things named in his honour ===
- Istana Sultan Hashim Jalilul Alam Aqamaddin, a palace built in Kampong Ayer in the 1880s and was dismantled.
- Kampong Sultan Lama, is a former village in Kampong Ayer and Bandar Seri Begawan.
- Jalan Sultan Hashim, a road named after him in Seria.

Regnal titles
Preceded by Abdul Momin	Sultan of Brunei; 1885–1906	Succeeded by Muhammad Jamalul Alam II
