= Pengiran Anak Khamis =

Bruneian nobility (died 1986)

Pengiran Anak Khamis ڤڠيرن انق خميس
- Pengiran Di-Gadong Sahibul Mal
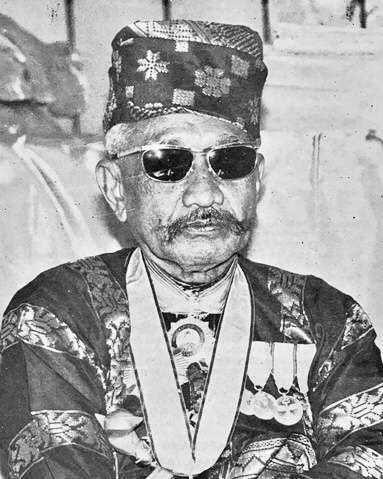
- Pengiran Anak Khamis in 1968
- Born: 1902–1903; Brunei Town, Brunei
- Died: 1986 (aged 82–84); Brunei
- Burial: Royal Mausoleum, Bandar Seri Begawan, Brunei
- Spouse: Pengiran Khadija
- Issue: Pengiran Anak Besar
Regnal name
- Pengiran Di-Gadong Sahibul Mal Pengiran Anak Haji Khamis ibni Al-Marhum Sultan Hashim Jalilul Alam Aqamaddin
- House: Bolkiah
- Father: Hashim Jalilul Alam Aqamaddin
- Mother: Pengiran Chendra Kesuma
- Religion: Islam

Pengiran Anak Khamis (Note: The alternative spelling of his given name is "Pengiran Anak Kamis" and "Pengiran Anak Ahmed Kamis" rather than "Pengiran Anak Khamis.") (died 1986) was a Bruneian nobleman and politician who formerly held several high-ranking positions which included being a member of the Privy Council, and the Brunei Islamic Religious Council. He is the non-gahara son of Sultan Hashim Jalilul Alam Aqamaddin, therefore does not carry the title Prince (Pengiran Muda).

== Career ==
Three sons of Hashim, namely Pengiran Anak Khamis, Pengiran Anak Safar, and Pengiran Anak Sabtu, in 1941 were negotiating with the British government a $20,000 payment made by Sarawak on account of its ancient rights over Limbang. He and his brothers acknowledged that they did not have a legitimate claim on Sarawak because their father had stopped making such claims, but all of them agreed that the sultan of Brunei deserved an equitable portion of the offer. They were also fearing Sultan Ahmad Tajuddin would try to rob the other heirs of their shares. They had previously written a letter directly to Charles Vyner Brooke expressing their stance, and were said to be cooperative and reasonable in the manner in which they went about entering. Their entrance was part of overall moves to explore and dispense compensation fairly among Hashim's descendants.

Within a 1960 Colonial Office List, Pengiran Anak Khamis was first noted to be a member of the Privy Council to Sultan Omar Ali Saifuddien III. On 10 April 1967, he was among the Bruneian hajj pilgrims to arrive at Jeddah, via Kuala Lumpur and Singapore. He would assume royal duties during ceremonial and national events after becoming a member of Cheteria, and later a Wazir in 1971.

== Personal life ==
Pengiran Anak Khamis was married to Pengiran Khadija and was the half-brother of Sultan Muhammad Jamalul Alam II, as he was not the son of his father's recognised queen consort (Raja Isteri), Pengiran Siti Fatimah. Together they have a daughter named Pengiran Anak Hajah Besar.

On 8 September 1963, he experienced the loss of his granddaughter, Dayangku Normala, at her home in Kampong Sungai Kianggeh. In her honour, flags across the nation were flown at half-mast the following day as a sign of condolence.

== Titles, styles and honours ==
=== Titles and styles ===
Personal standard of Pengiran Di-Gadong Sahibul Mal

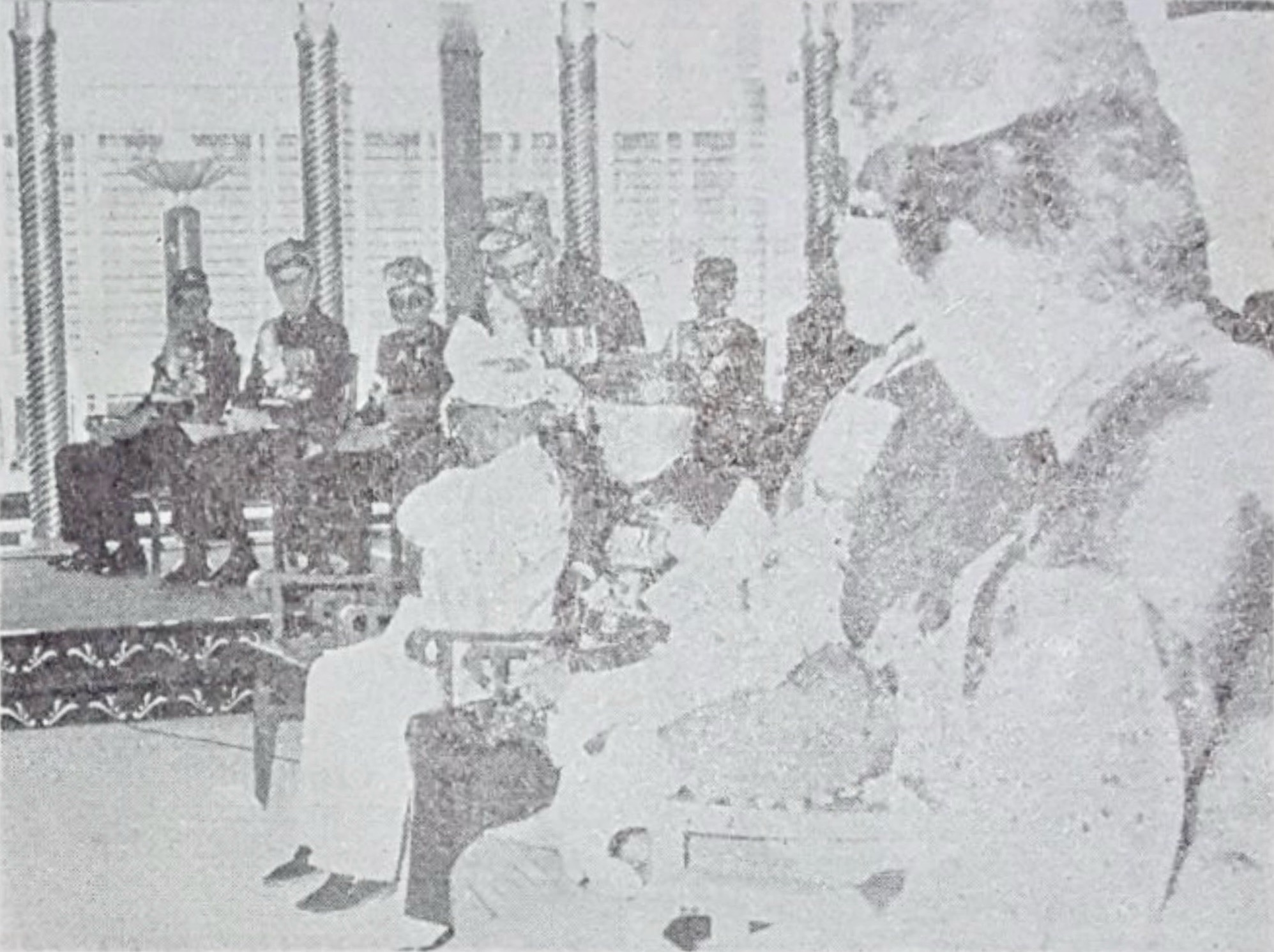
Pengiran Anak Khamis (in white) at the title bestowment ceremony held at the Lapau in 1971

On 15 February 1968, Pengiran Anak Khamis was honoured by Sultan Hassanal Bolkiah with the cheteria title of Pengiran Paduka Tuan Sahibul Karib. He was later elevated to the title of Pengiran Perdana Cheteria Laila Diraja Sahibun Nabalah on 15 May 1968. Each of these titles carries the style Yang Amat Mulia. His final promotion came in the form of the wazir title Pengiran Di-Gadong Sahibul Mal, (Note: After his death, the title was shortened to "Pengiran Di-Gadong." In English, the title translates to "Lord of the Treasury." Pengiran Di-Gadong held the highest authority for state affairs and military matters, and overseeing the nation's wealth.) which was conferred at the Lapau on 18 October 1971, and styled as Yang Teramat Mulia Seri Paduka. (Note: His full title is "Yang Teramat Mulia Seri Paduka Pengiran Di-Gadong Sahibol Mal Pengiran Anak Haji Khamis ibni Sultan Hashim Jalilul Alam Aqamaddin.") His title was superseded on 14 October 1975.

=== Honours ===
Pengiran Anak Khamis has been bestowed the following honours:

- Family Order of Laila Utama (DK; 1968) – Dato Laila Utama
- Family Order of Seri Utama (DK; 23 September 1967) – Dato Seri Utama
- Order of Seri Paduka Mahkota Brunei Second Class (DPMB; 23 September 1962) – Dato Paduka
- Omar Ali Saifuddin Medal (POAS; 23 September 1956)
- Meritorious Service Medal (PJK)
- Omar Ali Saifuddin Coronation Medal (31 May 1951)

== Notes ==
Regnal titles
Preceded by Pengiran Muhammad Salleh	Pengiran Temenggong Sahibul Bahar; 1971–1975	Succeeded by Prince Jefri Bolkiah
