= Muhammad Jamalul Alam II =

Sultan of Brunei from 1906 to 1924

Muhammad Jamalul Alam II محمد جمال العالم ٢
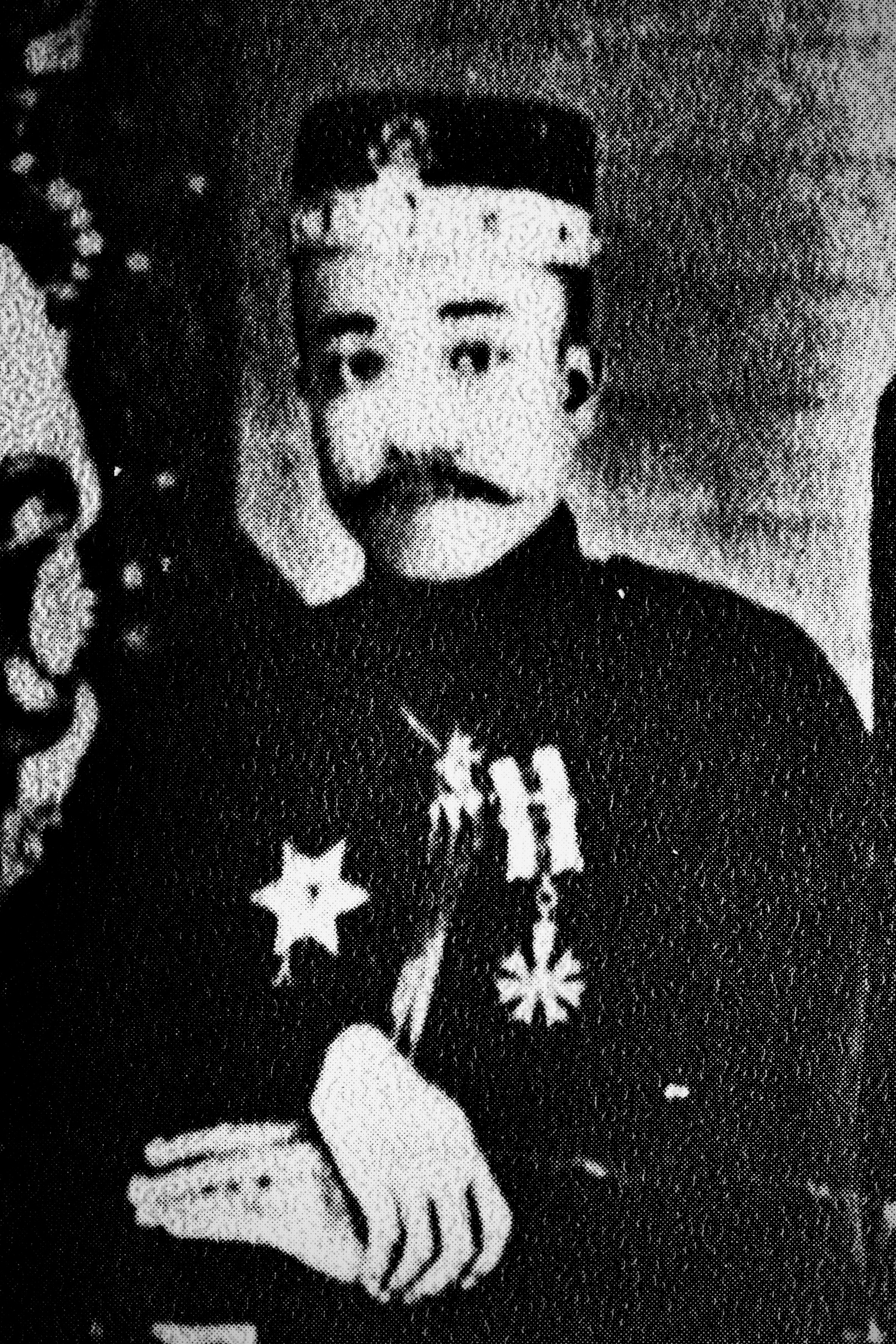
- Formal portrait, 1921

Sultan of Brunei
- Reign: 10 May 1906 – 19 September 1924
- Coronation: 15 May 1918
- Predecessor: Hashim Jalilul Alam Aqamaddin
- Successor: Ahmad Tajuddin
- Born: 1889
- Died: 19 September 1924 (aged 34–36)
- Burial: Royal Mausoleum, Bandar Seri Begawan, Brunei
- Spouses: Pengiran Isteri Tengah; Pengiran Anak Siti Fatimah
- Issue: Prince Bongsu; Ahmad Tajuddin; Prince Anum; Prince Laila Gambar; Omar Ali Saifuddien III; Pengiran Anak Besar Bagol; Princess Besar; Princess Tengah; Princess Damit; Princess Tinggal
- House: Bolkiah
- Father: Hashim Jalilul Alam Aqamaddin
- Mother: Pengiran Isteri Fatimah
- Religion: Islam

Muhammad Jamalul Alam II (1889 – 19 September 1924) was the 26th Sultan of Brunei from 1906 until his death in 1924. He was succeeded by his eldest son Ahmad Tajuddin.

Jamalul Alam was the first Bruneian sultan to speak English, reflecting British influence as Brunei navigated its relationship with the British Residency established in 1906. Initially, the Sultan encountered resistance from conservative royal family members opposed to British administrative reforms. Nevertheless, he eventually became known as a "model ruler" and a loyal British ally, admired for his intelligence and diplomatic approach. His rule saw Brunei through one of its most impoverished periods, as the country faced economic decline and social challenges. Despite this he aimed to encourage new developments in agriculture, medicine, and education, while also promoting Islamic learning. His unexpected death in 1924, when he was in his mid-30s, left Brunei under a regency during the minority of his son, Ahmad Tajuddin, sparking continued debates over the future of Brunei's education and governance.

== Reign ==
=== Succession ===
Born in 1889, Sultan Muhammad Jamalul Alam II rose to power during a turbulent political era marked by ongoing territorial disputes, particularly between the Brookes and the British North Borneo Company. As one of Abdul Mokti Nasar's most distinguished pupils, Jamalul Alam greatly benefited from his mentor's teachings, which profoundly influenced his commitment to advancing Islamic education and religious customs in Brunei.

Brunei's status as a British protectorate, formalized in 1888, further complicated the political landscape by granting Britain authority to intervene in succession disputes while allowing the sultan to retain control over internal affairs. This reliance on British support in matters of succession was not new, as seen in the ascensions of Sultan Abdul Momin in 1852 and Sultan Hashim Jalilul Alam Aqamaddin in 1885, whose succession faced challenges from Pengiran Anak Besar, the nephew of Pengiran Muda Hashim, who had been killed during the 1846 massacre ordered by Sultan Omar Ali Saifuddin II.

=== Early reign ===
On 10 May 1906, following Sultan Hashim's death, the British Resident recommended that his 17-year-old son, Jamalul Alam, (Note: According to the 2004 book Dokumentasi, he was known as Pengiran Muda Muhammad Jamalul Alam before he became sultan of Brunei in 1906.) succeed him as sultan, despite the traditional preference for the more senior Pengiran Bendahara. As a result, Jamalul Alam ascended the throne at a young age, under a period of co-regency with the wazirs, Pengiran Bendahara and Pengiran Pemancha. Initially, this arrangement created tension, as the regents, influential figures in Brunei's traditional administration, sought to maintain certain customary practices and limit British influence. Over time, however, Jamalul Alam grew into his role, eventually moving beyond the regents' influence to embrace a more progressive approach to governance, although British authority continued to shape the monarchy's direction.

Jamalul Alam was Brunei's first English-speaking ruler. Although higher levels of administration started using English during his rule, the British insisted that messages be written in formal Malay for the sultan's consideration. Even though English acquired considerable significance in government, it was still mostly limited to the highest levels of Brunei's administration, and the usage of Malay and Arabic as prestige languages in official communication persisted.

The sultan petitioned the British high commissioner, at the behest of the regents, to amend a number of administrative modifications that Resident Malcolm McArthur had proposed. The sultan asked that the government assist in the recovery of escaped slaves, that the sultan and State Council be consulted before issuing warrants against prominent people, that local judges (hakim) be permitted to try cases pertaining to Islam, and that the Brunei flag be flown over government buildings. The new sultan wanted to maintain certain elements of Brunei's traditional government, therefore his requests were a resistance against British influence.

Resident McArthur fiercely opposed Jamalul Alam when he attempted to uphold Brunei's laws and traditions, which the British perceived as a challenge to their power. Four of the sultan's requests were originally acceptable to McArthur, but he objected to the fifth, which called for the preservation of all Bruneian laws and customs. The British claimed that this weakened Brunei's modernisation measures. The sultan was forcefully informed by the high commissioner that the 1906 Treaty permitted the required legislative reforms. McArthur increased pressure, even going so far as to threaten to overthrow the young sultan or cut stipends if he continued. When Jamalul Alam and his regents finally gave in, Brunei's monarchy made a major concession on long-standing traditions, laws, and government under British protection, advancing the country's modernisation.

The British Resident's authority in Brunei was extensive, covering both executive and judicial areas, with the exception of matters related to Islam and customs. At one point in 1908–1909, British Resident J. F. Owen even threatened Jamalul Alam with removal from the throne for opposing a newly introduced land law. This threat ultimately led to the sultan's cooperation, which subsequently improved their relationship. According to D. E. Brown, cited in Muhaimin's work, Bruneians believed that the sultan retained power under the Resident System; however, those more familiar with the political landscape recognized that executive authority largely rested with the Resident.Jamalul Alam, after initial tension with British authorities over the implementation of the Land Code—which even led to a deposition threat from Sir John Anderson—grew into a more progressive ruler following the passing of the older generation of wazirs.

Under his reign, Islamic law was formally introduced in Brunei, marking a pivotal point in its legal history. Alongside British-introduced common law, equity, and statute systems, Brunei's legal framework began adapting to local contexts, with Western influence still significant, particularly in Islamic family law. The limited application of Islamic law for Muslims resulted in a largely derivative system. Brunei's first modern Islamic law, the 1912 Islamic Law Enactment, addressed issues around marriage and divorce, including prayer abandonment, adultery, and spousal support. The 1913 Islamic Marriage and Divorce Enactment further formalised these matters, mandating that Muslim marriages and divorces be registered with a Kadi within seven days, with fines for non-compliance.

Jamalul Alam also played a pivotal role in the development of Brunei's modern infrastructure, with one of his key achievements being the formation of the Brunei Police Force in 1906. Two officers from the Straits Settlements Police Force were assigned to Brunei Town, now Bandar Seri Begawan, marking the beginning of Brunei's police history. This arrangement was due to Brunei's administrative ties with the British-controlled Colony of Labuan. In order to promote education throughout the nation, he also established Malay schools in 1911. In that same year, he also directed the start of oil drilling explorations in Labi and Bukit Puan, leading to the ultimate discovery of some in Labi in 1914.

=== Coronation ===
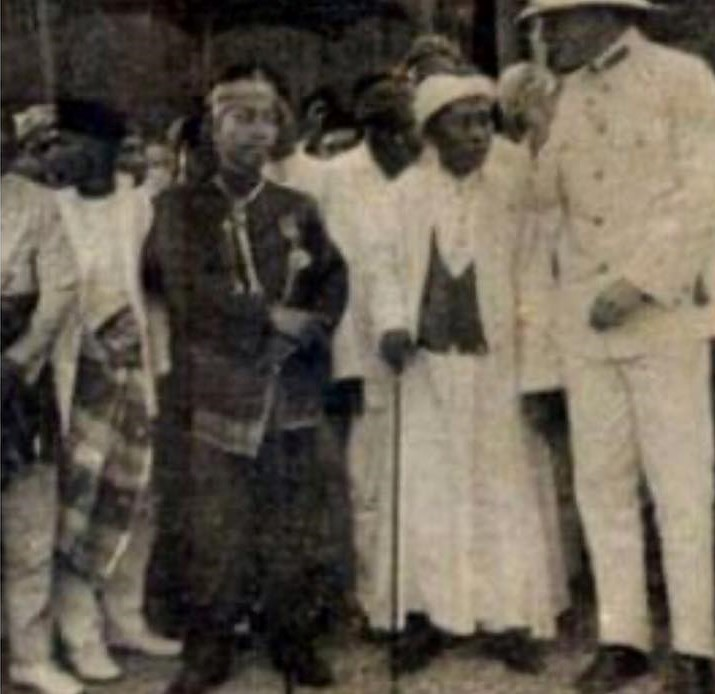
Jamalul Alam at a state ceremony in the 1920s

The coronation or installation of Jamalul Alam as the Yang Di-Pertuan on 15 May 1918 marked a significant turning point in Brunei's history, as it symbolised the end of the co-regency and the restoration of the sultan's direct authority. (Note: Haji Abdul Ghaffar bin Abdul Mumin and British Resident McArthur, both provided detailed eyewitness reports of this incident.) The ceremony began with traditional rituals, including the sultan's ceremonial bathing, followed by the donning of the ancient gold crown, a heavy regalia signifying royal power. Jamalul Alam, accompanied by key figures such as the Pengiran Bendahara and the Pengiran Pemancha, was carried in a royal litter through Brunei Town. As he passed through the streets, the people of Brunei showed immense enthusiasm, cheering and demonstrating their loyalty to their newly crowned Sultan.

Upon reaching the Lapau, the formal coronation took place. The Pengiran Bendahara recited the sultan's lineage and claims to the throne, calling on all present to pledge their allegiance. The Orang Kaya Temenggong, holding a drawn sword, ensured that the subjects paid their respects in an orderly fashion. However, the formality of the proceedings soon gave way to a spontaneous outpouring of emotion from the crowd, with many eager to touch the sultan as an act of homage. This moment of intense excitement required the sultan to be escorted back to a private room, where the ceremony continued in a more controlled manner.

The coronation was not only a formal transition of power but also a cultural event that showcased the traditional practices of Brunei's royal court. The ceremony included a procession of dignitaries, the presentation of royal regalia, and symbolic acts of loyalty and submission. The event was punctuated by displays of public affection and respect for the sultan, illustrating the deep connection between the ruler and his subjects. The festivities continued with land sports and fireworks, adding to the celebratory atmosphere of the day, culminating in a grand display of unity and national pride.

=== Later reign and death ===
Embracing new ideas like education and vaccination programs, he was recognized for his efforts with an honorary knighthood in the 1920 Birthday Honours, (Note: Honorary Knighthood of the Most Distinguished Order of St Michael and St George granted to Jamalul Alam by King George V in appreciation of his unwavering allegiance to the British Crown throughout World War I (1914–1918).) and his untimely death was deeply mourned by the British. In 1922, Jamalul Alam's decision to relocate his palace from Kampong Sultan Lama to the interior of Brunei Town (Note: Istana Majlis, the new land-based palace of Jamalul Alam, was finished in 1921.) renewed interest in Resident McArthur's proposal for relocating the Kampong Ayer community. His involvement inspired Kampong Ayer residents to consider mainland resettlement, and relocation efforts in the 1920s began expanding beyond the city centre to areas like Tungkadeh and Kumbang Pasang, marking a significant shift in Brunei's urban development.

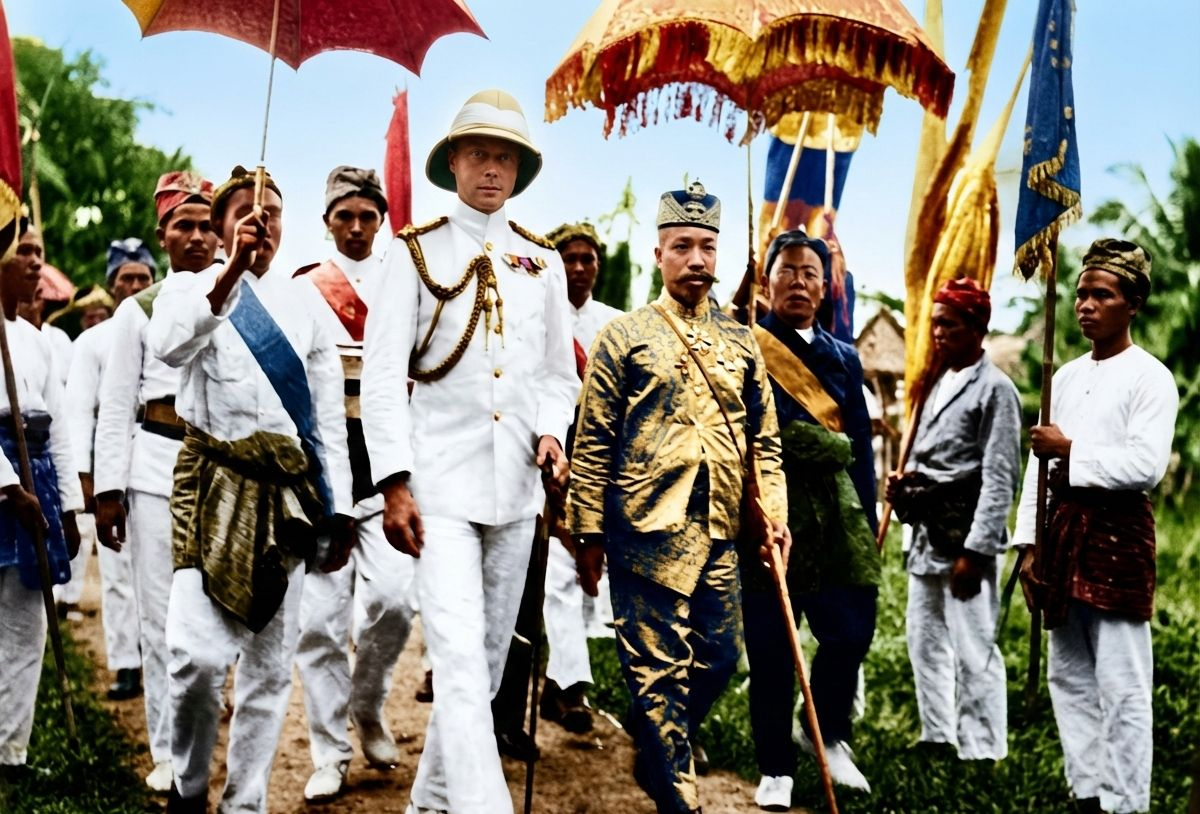
Prince of Wales (left) and Jamalul Alam (middle) in 1922

In 1922, Jamalul Alam sent a troupe of traditional Bruneian artists to Singapore as part of his retinue for the Malaya and Borneo Cultural Festival, held in celebration of the Prince of Wales' visit. This event provided Bruneian artists with the opportunity to present their traditional art forms while experiencing Western-style arts for the first time, marking a significant moment in Brunei's theatrical history. The occasion is often regarded as the beginning of Brunei's rich stage performance tradition.

Later on 18 May 1922, the Prince of Wales visited Borneo, where he was received by Jamalul Alam and officers from HMS Renown (1916) and HMS Cairo (D87). The sultan arrived just before the public was restricted from the area, dressed in gold silk robes and accompanied by ministers, advisers, and an honor guard, positioning himself at the prince's landing point. Shortly after noon, the prince arrived to a twenty-one-gun salute, and Jamalul Alam greeted him onshore. Following a brief exchange with the sultan, the British Resident introduced each assembled officer, and the prince greeted them in turn. He then joined the sultan in the royal chair, which transported them to the audience hall. Dressed informally in shorts and an open-necked army shirt, the prince appeared in high spirits. Later, officers from the Renown and Cairo joined for a formal curry luncheon at the courthouse, while the prince and the British Resident's wife took a brief excursion to nearby falls. By late afternoon, the prince concluded his visit, thanking all those present and noting that he had greatly enjoyed the occasion.

Jamalul Alam died on 19 September 1924, (Note: According to Jamil Al-Sufri and other sources have reported his date of death as 19 September 1924. Meanwhile, some states that it was on 11 September 1924.) at the age of 35, following a brief bout of malaria that was worsened by grief over the recent loss of his primary wife, Pengiran Isteri Tengah, and their two children, also to malaria. His passing marked the beginning of a new regency period during the minority of his eldest son and successor, Pengiran Muda Besar Ahmad Tajuddin, which further strengthened the British Resident's authority in Brunei. Jamalul Alam was laid to rest in the Royal Mausoleum on Jalan Tutong.

== Personal life ==
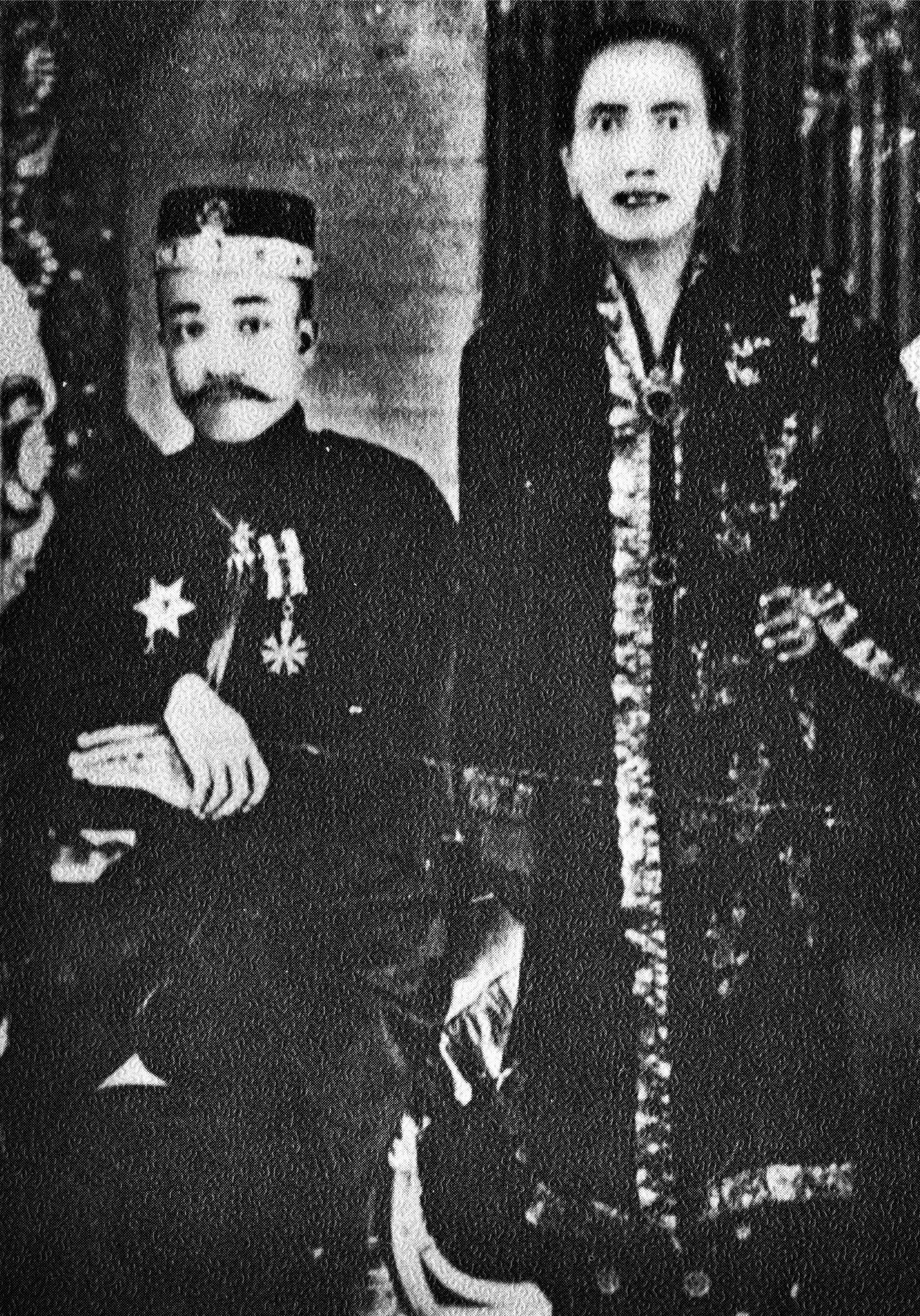
Official portrait of Sultan Jamalul Alam and Pengiran Anak Siti Fatimah in 1921

Jamalul Alam was first married to Pengiran Isteri Tengah, followed by Pengiran Anak Siti Fatimah, who was granted the title of Raja Isteri (Queen Consort) and styled as Duli Yang Maha Mulia. Pengiran Anak Siti Fatimah was the daughter of Pengiran Tua Omar Ali ibni Pengiran Pemancha Pengiran Anak Muhammad Salleh I, and Pengiran Babu Raja Pengiran Anak Tengah binti Pengiran Maharaja Lela Pengiran Anak Abdul Kahar. She died on 7 March 1947, and due to Brunei's limited communication infrastructure at the time, her death was announced through arrangements by BARIP President H. M. Salleh. With his two wives, he had a total of 10 children.

- Pengiran Muda Bongsu (18 November 1908 – 1910)
- Sultan Ahmad Tajuddin Akhazul Khairi Waddien (22 August 1913 – 4 June 1950), Sultan of Brunei from 1924 to 1950
- Pengiran Muda Anum (died September 1924), killed by malaria
- Pengiran Muda Laila Gambar (died September 1924), killed by malaria
- Sultan Omar Ali Saifuddien Sa'adul Khairi Waddien (23 September 1914 – 7 September 1986), Sultan of Brunei from 1950 to 1967
- Pengiran Anak Besar Bagol (died 10 June 1945), married Pengiran Bini Zainab
- Pengiran Anak Puteri Besar (1902 – 16 September 1993), married to Pengiran Bendahara Pengiran Muda Hashim
- Pengiran Anak Puteri Tengah (1910 – 24 August 1969)
- Pengiran Anak Puteri Damit (born 6 April 1911)
- Pengiran Anak Puteri Tinggal, married to Pengiran Anak Besar

== Things named after him ==
- Muhammad Jamalul Alam Mosque, named after him and the late Sultan Muhammad Jamalul Alam I.
- Sultan Muhammad Jamalul Alam Middle School (SMJA), formerly Sultan Muhammad Jamalul Alam Malay Middle School.
- Maharajalela Jamalulalam (MLJ) is an offshore gas field that was discovered in 1990.

== Honours ==
- Honorary Knight Commander of the Order of St Michael and St George (KCMG; 1920) – Sir
- Honorary Companion of the Order of St Michael and St George (CMG; 1914)

== Notes ==
Regnal titles
| Preceded by Hashim Jalilul Alam Aqamaddin | Sultan of Brunei; 1906–1924 | Succeeded by Ahmad Tajuddin |
