= Kampong Burong Pingai Ayer =

Kampong Burong Pingai Ayer Kampung Burong Pingai Ayer
- Village
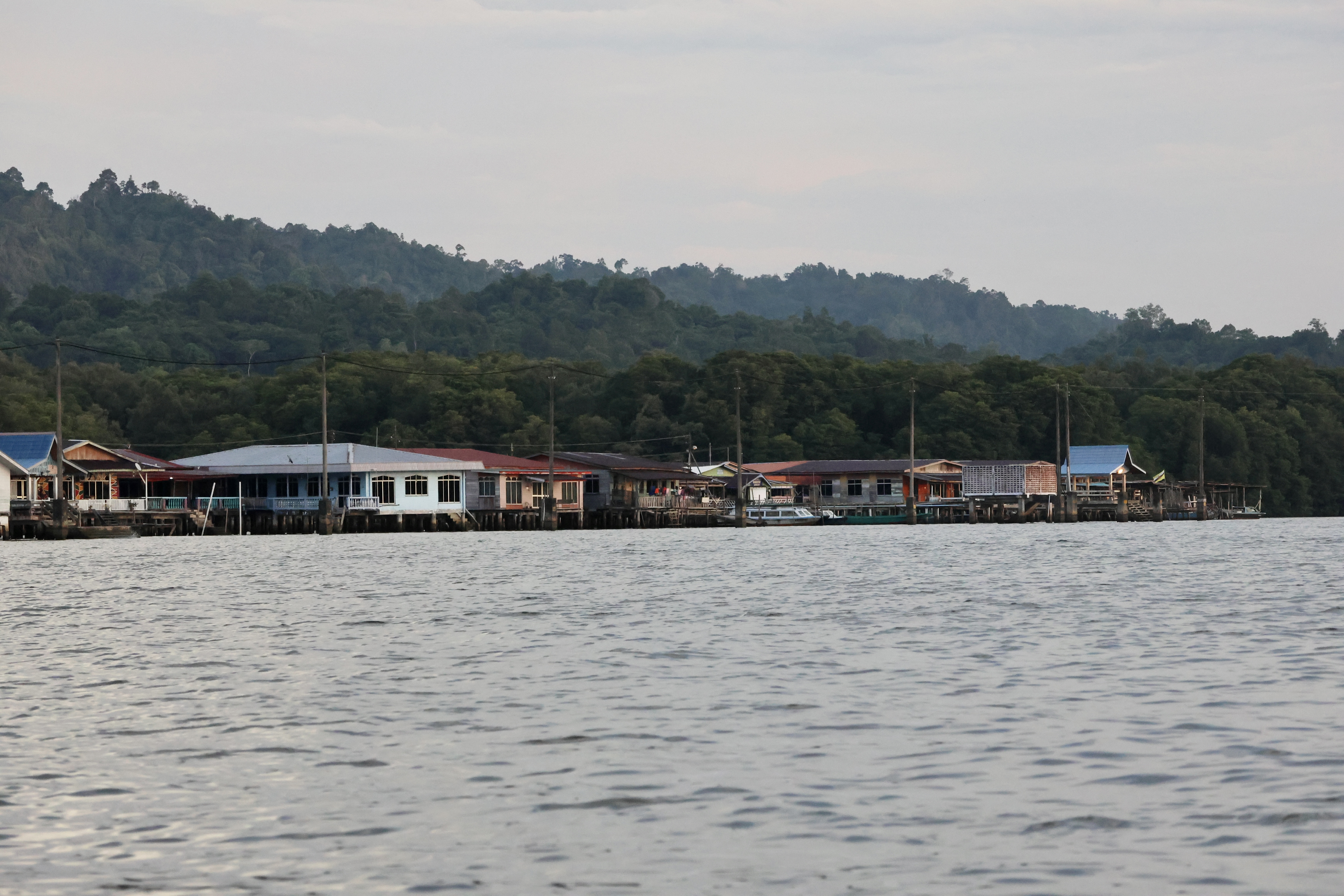
- View of the stilt houses in Kampong Burong Pingai Ayer from the Brunei River in 2023

- Location in Brunei
- Coordinates: 4°52′34″N 114°56′02″E
- Country: Brunei
- District: Brunei–Muara
- Mukim: Burong Pingai Ayer

Government
  - Village chief: Tarip Asgar

Population (2021)
  - Total: 431
- Time zone: UTC+8 (BNT)
- Postcode: BM1126

Kampong Burong Pingai Ayer is a village in Brunei–Muara District, Brunei, within Mukim Burong Pingai Ayer. It is located within Kampong Ayer, the traditional stilted settlements on the Brunei River in the country's capital Bandar Seri Begawan. The population was 514 in 2016.

== Etymology ==
Due to its location at the hulu (the interior or beginning) of the Brunei River, Kampong Burong Pingai was previously known as Kampong Ulu-Ulu. According to legend, the hamlet was named Kampong Burong Pingai because a pembalat (a person who uses a bamboo basket to capture fish or builds fish traps out of bamboo) from Kampong Saba discovered a white bird making the sound "pingai, pingai, pingai" at the settlement. The man was aware that Si Pingai, a white bird owned by Sultan Muhammad Shah's wife, had recently passed away. The bird was captured, and it was given to the sultan. From that time, the village has been referred to as Kampong Burong Pingai. According to legend, Sultan Muhammad Shah's wife was a Johor princess, and the incident took place somewhere about 1368.

== History ==
The village was formerly known as "Kampong Burong Pingai" until the name was added with the term "Ayer" in the 1960s to distinguish it from the land village Kampong Burong Pingai Berakas. Kampong Burong Pingai Ayer also cannot be denied from an unwanted tragedy because the village had experienced a fire in early 2000 which destroyed nine houses and while in early 2001 Dato Ahmad Primary School was hit by the incident followed by three houses in 2006.

== Demography ==
As of 2015, Kampong Burong Pingai Ayer currently has 82 houses with a population of 587 people consisting of 288 males and 299 females including 52 senior citizens. The village is one of the villages under Mukim Burong Pingai Ayer.

== Infrastructure ==
In the government of Brunei's concern, the village was also given facilities such as water supply, electricity, bridges, piers, mosques, schools and so on. Emphasizing the spirit of mutual understanding, the Burong Pingai Subdistrict Multi-Purpose Hall was built in 2014 with the aim of holding a feast, a celebration that can accommodate up to 800 people. Notably, the village is the home to the first ever mosque in Kampong Ayer.

=== Mosque ===
Pehin Datu Imam Haji Abdul Mokti Mosque is the village mosque and was inaugurated by Prince Sufri Bolkiah on 6 February 1981. The mosque can accommodate 350 worshippers. It is named after a certain pious man who was born in the village.

== Notable people ==
- Badaruddin Othman (born 1942), politician and civil servant
- Suhaili Mohiddin, politician and civil servant
- Abdul Mokti Nasar (1864–1946), Muslim scholar
