= Abdul Mokti Nasar =

Bruneian educator and Muslim scholar (1864–1946)

Pehin Datu Imam Mokti Nasar
- موكتي نسر
- Born: 1864; Kampong Burong Pingai, Kampong Ayer, Brunei
- Died: 1946 (aged 81–82)
- Occupation: Muslim scholar

Abdul Mokti bin Haji Nasar (Note: Various spellings of his name have been noted, including Mokti for his given name and Nassar for his patronymic. His full title and name is Pehin Datu Imam Awang Haji Abdul Mokti bin Awang Nasar.) (1864–1946) was a Muslim scholar, Sufi teacher, and Islamic reformer in Brunei around the turn of the 20th century. He played a pivotal role in introducing the Qadiriya-Naqshbandiyya Sufi order to Brunei, promoting a scriptural approach to Islam and establishing his balai as a leading religious centre. He significantly contributed to Brunei's religious education, attracting prominent students, spreading Islamic teachings across the region, and leaving behind influential writings on Islamic spirituality and socio-religious issues.

== Biography ==
Abdul Mokti was born in 1864 (1281 Hijrah) in Kampong Burong Pingai (present day Kampong Burong Pingai Ayer), part of Kampong Ayer in Brunei. He pursued religious education under the guidance of prominent scholars, including Syeikh Ahmad Khatib of Sambas, Indonesia and Dato Ahmad Haji Abdul Latif. His expertise lay in Tariqat Qadariyah, which he studied through these teachers and religious texts from Sumatra, Indonesia, such as As-Sirat Al-Mustaqim. His dedication to spreading Islam took him to various regions, including Sarawak and Sambas. During his four-year pilgrimage to Mecca, he deepened his religious knowledge, mastered Arabic, and gained a profound understanding of Islamic teachings.

Abdul Mokti became a distinguished scholar known for addressing socio-religious concerns relevant to his contemporaries. He introduced the Qadiriya-Naqshbandiyya Sufi order to Brunei, emphasising a more scriptural approach to Islam. His influence extended through his balai (religious centre), where he lectured, counselled, and promoted a Sharia-focused interpretation of Islam, contributing significantly to Brunei's tradition of religious education and reform.

By the late 19th century, Abdul Mokti played a pivotal role in connecting Brunei with the broader Islamic world, particularly through his ties with Shaykh Ahmad Khatib. This connection facilitated the spread of the Qadiriyya, Naqshbandiyya, and Qadiriyya-Naqshbandiyya orders in Brunei, fostering the country's religious and spiritual growth.

Upon his return, Abdul Mokti established a teaching hall and expanded his outreach to interior regions such as Pudak, Pulau Berbunut, Labu Estate, and Padas in Sabah. His dedication attracted notable students, including Sultans Muhammad Jamalul Alam II and Omar Ali Saifuddien III. In 1920, he officiated the opening of a mosque in Labu Estate, Temburong, solidifying his influence in the community. He left behind a significant body of writings, including duaas, fatwas, the genealogy of Tariqat Qadariyah, accounts of cholera outbreaks in 1290 and 1322 Hijrah, and the teachings of Luqman Al-Hakim.

His prolonged stay in Mecca reflected Brunei's improving socioeconomic conditions, enabling more Bruneians to undertake the pilgrimage. His studies and mastery of Arabic strengthened ties between Brunei and the Jawi community in Mecca. Upon his return, his balai became the most prominent religious center in Brunei during the early 20th century, marking a period of significant socio-religious transformation.

Abdul Mokti's teachings, rooted in Islamic spirituality, employed an evolutionary approach to scripturalisation. His lessons were closely aligned with the Qur'an, Hadith, and the sayings of respected ulama, often citing well-known works like Abu Bakr al-Razi's kitab al-mujarrabat (Book of Wonders). Balancing traditional adat (customary practices) with scholarly rigor, he effectively communicated a scripturalised form of Islam, bridging the gap between traditional beliefs and evolving religious understanding in Brunei.

== Things named after him ==
- Pehin Datu Imam Haji Abdul Mokti Mosque, located in Kampong Burong Pingai Ayer, was inaugurated in 1981.
