= Kampong Perpindahan Mata-Mata =

Perpindahan Mata-Mata
- Village and public housing estate
- Kampong Perpindahan Mata-Mata
- Location in Brunei
- Coordinates: 4°53′52″N 114°53′07″E
- Country: Brunei
- District: Brunei-Muara
- Mukim: Gadong 'B'
- Established: 1983

Government
  - Village head: Pengiran Muhammad Nurramzu Nazri

Area
  - Total: 173.2584 ha (428.131 acres)

Population (2016)
  - Total: 2,385
  - Density: 1,377/km^{2} (3,565/sq mi)
- Time zone: UTC+8 (BNT)
- Postcode: BE1918

Kampong Perpindahan Mata-Mata (Malay: Kampung Perpindahan Mata-Mata) or simply known as Perpindahan Mata-Mata, is a public housing estate and designated village in Brunei-Muara District, Brunei, on the outskirts of the capital Bandar Seri Begawan. The population was 2,385 in 2016. It is one of the villages within Mukim Gadong 'B'. The postcode is BE1918.

== Etymology ==
The village was originally known as Merlimau. It could be named after a neighboring village, Kampong Mata-Mata. The additional name of Perpindahan translates to Transfer.

== History ==
Kampong Perpindahan Mata-Mata was established in 1983 as one of the settlement areas under the relocation program in the 20th century, which is a government program for Kampong Ayer residents to move and settle on land. This village is also for the resettlement of people in several villages who lost their homes due to a fire. The residents who started moving to the village in early 1983 were in stages. The people who first moved to this village were from Kampong Sumbiling Lama, then followed by Kampong Sumbiling Baru. Only the head of the family was given free and his children paid monthly, Kampong Sungai Kedayan and Kampong Sultan Lama which is the neighborhood in Kampong Ayer, as well as Kampong Pulau Baru-Baru and Kampong Pulau Berbunut at the mouth of the Brunei River and Kampong Bunut in Mukim Kilanas.

== Geography ==
Kampong Perpindahan Mata-Mata is located in the middle of the Brunei-Muara District, which is in the West of Bandar Seri Begawan. The village neighbors Kampong Mata-Mata in the East and the Skim Tanah Kurnia Rakyat Jati (STKRJ) Mata-Mata in the West.

== Demography ==
There are 210 houses in Perpindahan Mata-Mata and this does not include STKRJ Mata-Mata. The population according to the population census in 2011 was 2,241 people. Most of its residents work with the government and private agencies.

== Infrastructure ==
=== Education ===
- Pengiran Pekerma Setia Diraja Sahibul Bandar Primary School was built in March 1990 with a land area of 15,037 acres, with a cost of BND$3.8 million and was fully completed in August 1992. On 1 September 1992 the school began operating under the name Kampong Perpindahan Mata-Mata Gadong Primary School. On 23 July 1996 in conjunction with the 50th Birthday of His Majesty the Sultan, it was renamed its current name, in conjunction with the name of one of the devoted teachers, namely Pengiran Haji Ali bin Pengiran Haji Md. Daud.
- The same school is used for religious schooling known as the Pengiran Pekerma Setia Diraja Sahibul Bandar Religious School from Grade One to Grade Six, for the afternoon learning sessions.

=== Mosque ===
- Kampong Perpindahan Mata-Mata Mosque has playgrounds and roads that have been upgraded and Kedai Koperasi Kampung Perpindahan Mata-Mata (KOPERMATA), members are made up of the village's own children.

== See also ==
- Public housing in Brunei
- STKRJ Kampong Mata-Mata
