= Vizier (Brunei) =

Brunei Hierarchy

The Wazir (English: Vizier; Jawi: وزير) are a group of royal dignitaries within the Sultanate of Brunei whose position ranks the second-highest official in the country behind the Sultan. The Wazir had formerly held the position of the Sultan's highest official in the administration of the then-reigning government throughout Brunei's history, particularly during the times prior to and after the British protectorate (British Resident and Assistant British Resident). The core of Brunei's nobility consisted of this class of governmental offices, and it consists of a Perdana Wazir, and Wazir Empat under him. Notably, they are sometimes referred to as and acted as Senior Ministers.

== History ==
In the administration of the Government of Brunei, the vizier position has long been the top one in Brunei. The only Wazir during the early Sultans of Brunei's rule were Bendahara and Temenggong. Traditionally, the ranking of the four wazirs is as follows; Bendahara, Di-Gadong, Temenggong and Pemancha. At the end of the 16th century, under Sultan Muhammad Hasan, Pemancha and Di-Gadong were first used. During the reign of Sultan Hassanal Bolkiah, the present Sultan of Brunei, Perdana Wazir was only recently introduced.

As of 2005, it seems that the majority of the Wazir belonged to the core aristocracy. On 6 February 1970, a fifth position was created as Perdana Wazir. The Pengiran Bendahara was the highest rank held by a Wazir prior to 1970. In addition to serving as the senior official in things pertaining to Islam, he assumed the power or authority of the Sultan in the event that the latter was absent from the nation.

== Etymology ==
=== Bendahara ===
The office of Bendahara (a Sanskrit title) increased in significance during the Malacca Sultanate about 1400. In the traditional Malay states, the bendahara is the chief minister and is second only to the sultan in rank, power, and authority. Its duties included carrying out the sultan's orders, serving as prime minister, and serving as commander in chief. In order to increase the sultan's independence, the bendahara also provided him with a palace and a bride who was a member of his own family. After a sultan died, this official's most significant task may have been to gather the royal regalia and serve as regent during the interim until he turned the regalia over to the heir. The role was frequently held by a senior member of the sultan's family.

=== Di-Gadong ===
Di-Gadong is a high official title whose definitions are ambiguous. His responsibilities were differently described but generally included three components. He was in charge of the treasury or finances. The Sultan's household was under his management. In particular, he was in charge of taxation inside the Sultanate's domains. Considering the latter, it should be understood that he was in charge of the Sultan's apprehensions. Notably, the Bruneian Malay term for the colour green is gadong. The term "Gadong" refers to a greenish affluent of the Brunei River, which is itself an affluent of the Kedayan River, which it joins.

=== Temenggong ===
In the traditional Malay states, the person in charge of enforcing the law and overseeing the army and police was known as a Temenggong. This significant nonhereditary role was defined during the rise of the Malaccan Sultanate in the 15th century, which served as a hub for trade between Southeast Asia, China, and India. The temenggong played a crucial role in upholding the household tranquility necessary for the thriving trade of the Malaccan Sultanate. His responsibilities included maintaining order, caring for criminals, constructing jails, policing city streets, and ensuring the precision of weights and measures in commerce. Although Malacca's prominence declined after the 15th century, other Malay rulers adopted its administrative system, which included the office of temenggong, and it flourished and persisted till the 19th century.

=== Pemancha ===
Pemancha is a high official title whose definitions are ambiguous. Lower-level evidence suggests that district chiefs in Sabah are known as Orang Kaya Kaya and that the Land Dayak counterpart of a Penghulu in Sarawak is known as Orang Kaya Pemancha. The headmen of several villages are also referred to as Pemancha in Sarawak.

== Functions ==
High-ranking government officials in Brunei, such as the senior Wazir, Pengiran Bendahara, and Pengiran Paduka Tuan, oversee Islamic religious affairs to strengthen Islam in the country. The Manteri-Manteri Ugama, with appointed officers like Mudim, have managed Islamic matters since the time of Sultan Saiful Rijal. Despite British rule, these religious leaders continued to influence national affairs, as exemplified by Pehin Tuan Imam Haji Mohidin bin Nakhoda Jambul's appointment to the State Council in 1907. This illustrates the government's efforts to elevate Islam's role in Brunei.

== Hierarchy ==
In Bruneian society, a person's position and status are indicated by a variety of characteristics. A royal court or state function's seating arrangement is one method. In seating configurations, di atas (upper) and di bawah (lower) are used as measurements. The top end, which is often the farthest from the door, is occupied by those of greatest status. The remaining guests are placed near the entrance in decreasing order of rank. Gradations of precedence may also be shown by a person's sitting arrangement, whereby those on the right are sat higher than those on the left.

The Kepala Wazir's official title is Perdana Wazir, while the Wazir Empat's official titles are basically known as Bendahara, Di-Gadong, Pemancha, and Temenggong. The title is invariably followed by Pengiran, nevertheless, because they are typically chosen from the people with Pengiran titles, particularly the royal family and Pengiran Bertaras (Sultan's siblings). In addition, a few additional words were added following the basic title of Wazir. But only when the incumbent is still alive will the full title be used. Wazir's list is as follows:

- Kepala Wazir
  - Pengiran Perdana Wazir Sahibul Himmah Wal-Waqar
- Wazir Empat
  - Pengiran Bendahara Seri Maharaja Permaisuara
  - Pengiran Di-Gadong Sahibul Mal
  - Pengiran Pemancha Sahibul Rae' Wal-Mashuarah
  - Pengiran Temenggong Sahibul Bahar

== Title and styling ==
Every person who becomes a Wazir possesses a certain set of rules that they must follow when discussing certain aspects of the surat-menyurat (letters used for activities carried out by one party to another party continuously, whose activities are carried out by sending letters to each other), including naming the Wazir in question. Wazir is understood to originate from a prince who is either gahara (pure royal lineage) or not. For the wazir who is the prince of the Sultan, it is styled as Duli Yang Teramat Mulia Paduka Seri (The Most Glorious), while other than that, it is referred to as Yang Teramat Mulia Seri Paduka (The Most Illustrious).

== Court uniform and dress ==
The viziers sit above the Cheteria and Manteri. These Wazir, who are often men of royal descent, fly separate flags above their homes: white for the Perdana Wazir and Bendahara, green for the Di-Gadong, black for the Pemancha and scarlet for the Temenggong. The flags are remarkably straightforward and affordable.

Wazirs usually sit behind the Sultan and his siblings at ceremonial events. The royal umbrella, the kampilan and kelasak (shield), the sinipit (spear), and kaskol (gold betel container) were the regalia. Traditional fabric was used to wrap the kaskol. The royal members' status was indicated by the colour of the wrapping paper. For example, the kaskol wrapping of the Sultan was made of yellow supplemental weft fabric, while that of the Pengiran Bendahara and Perdana Wazir were made of white. The Perdana Wazir and Bendahara have white regalia bearers.

The typical black clothing of the royal regalia carriers was worn, but the colour of their dastar, arat (belt), and sinjang (sarong) varied according to the status of the person whose regalia they were carrying. For example, the officers carrying the Sultan's regalia wore traditional black-backed woven cloth embellished with golden thread in the form of sinjang, arat, and dastar, a pattern of kain berturus (vertical). Although the two fabrics had the same kain berturus pattern, the ornamentation included distinct designs. The regalia bearers of the Bendahara wore kain biasa, whereas the Perdana Wazir wore kain bepakan, which was made of gold threads woven alternately through the wefts. Since gold thread was not used for the weft in kain biasa, the cloth had a matte appearance. In this instance, it seems to the audience that the variations in the shimmering effect on the garments indicate the varying ranks of the individuals wearing the regalia.

Copper, silver, and gold items used in royal ceremonies reveal the rank and identity of the owner. Items such as the keris (Malay dagger) and kaskol (gold betel container) were given to royal dignitaries who received the title of Wazir, Cheteria, and Manteri. The kaskol is only given to the Wazir and the Kepala Cheteria while Cheteria-Cheteria and Manteri-Manteri such as Kepala Manteri and Kepala Manteri Empat receive the silver-born tipa (container or vessel to store betel and its seasonings) while copper-born tipa is granted for the other officials ranked below.

Ceremonial uniforms of Wazir

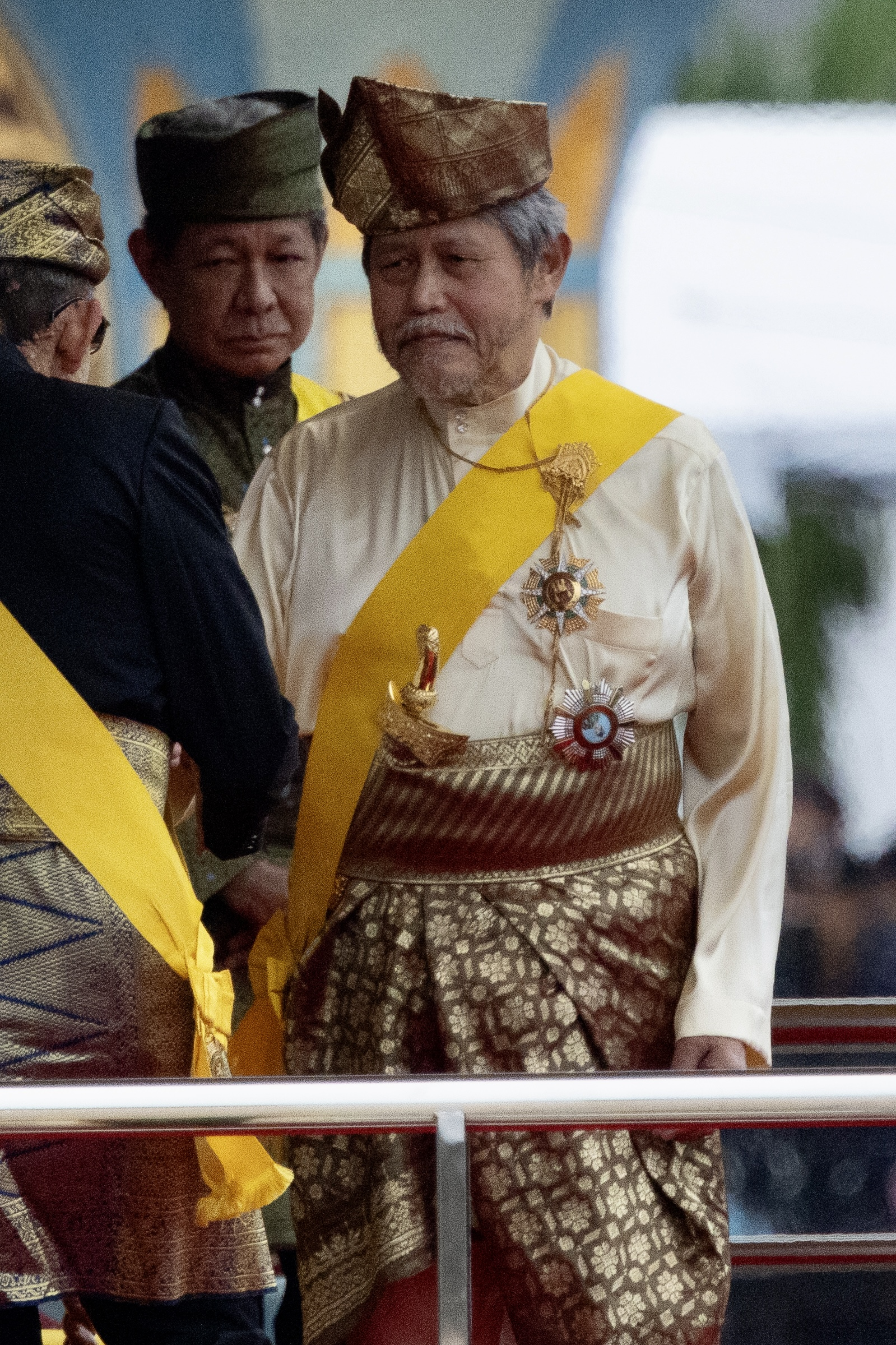
Prince Mohamed Bolkiah, Perdana Wazir

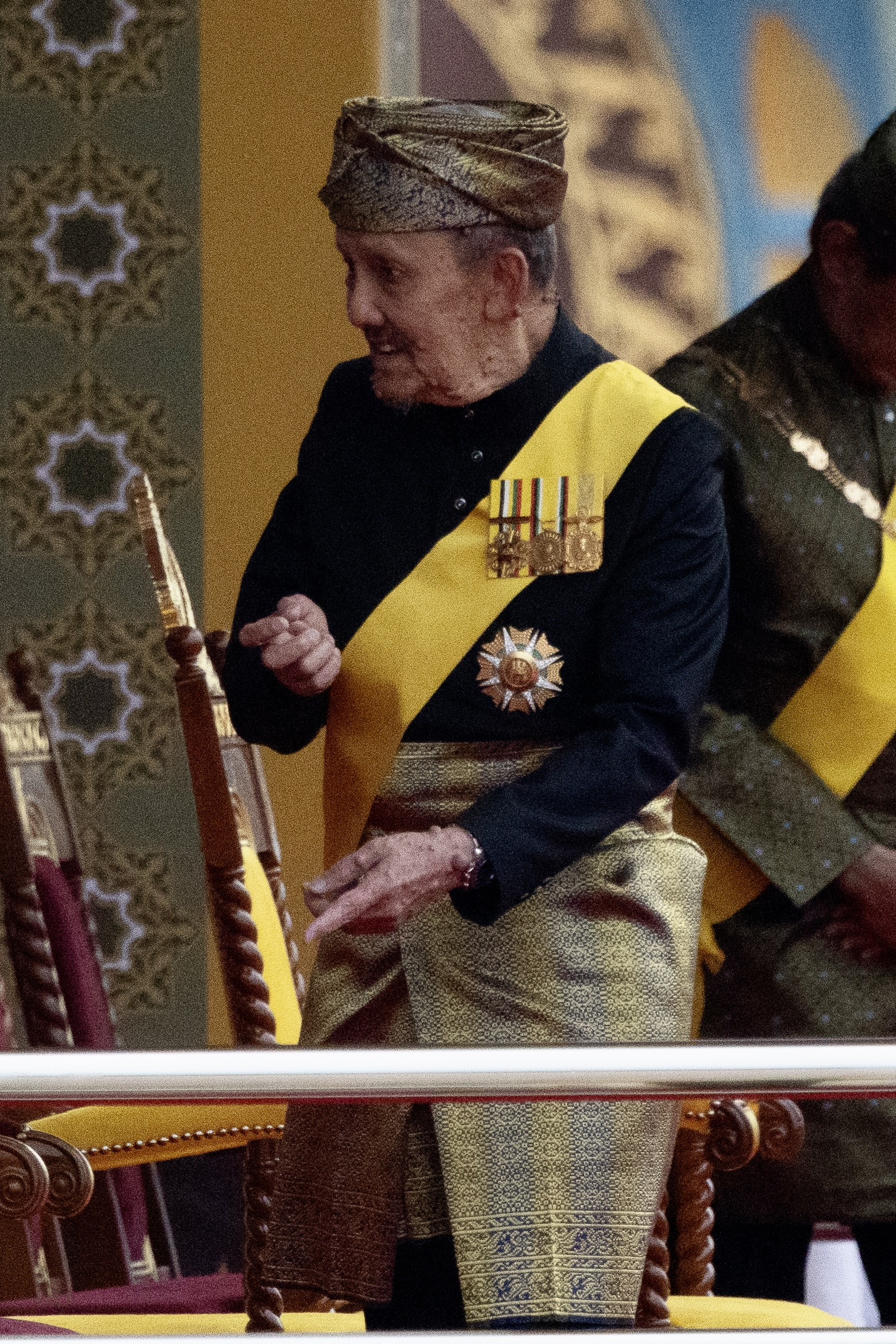
Prince Sufri Bolkiah, Bendahara

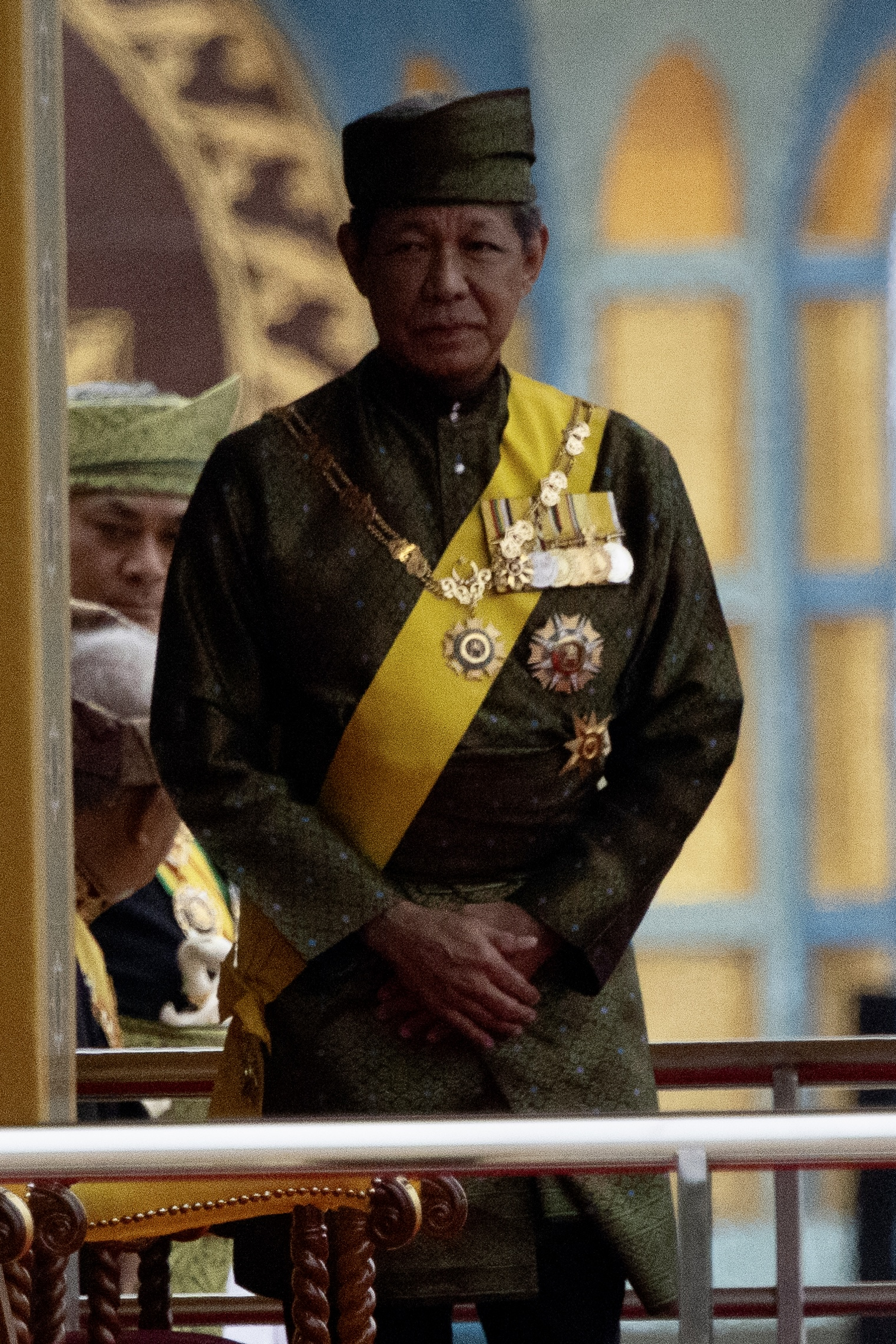
Prince Jefri Bolkiah, Di-Gadong

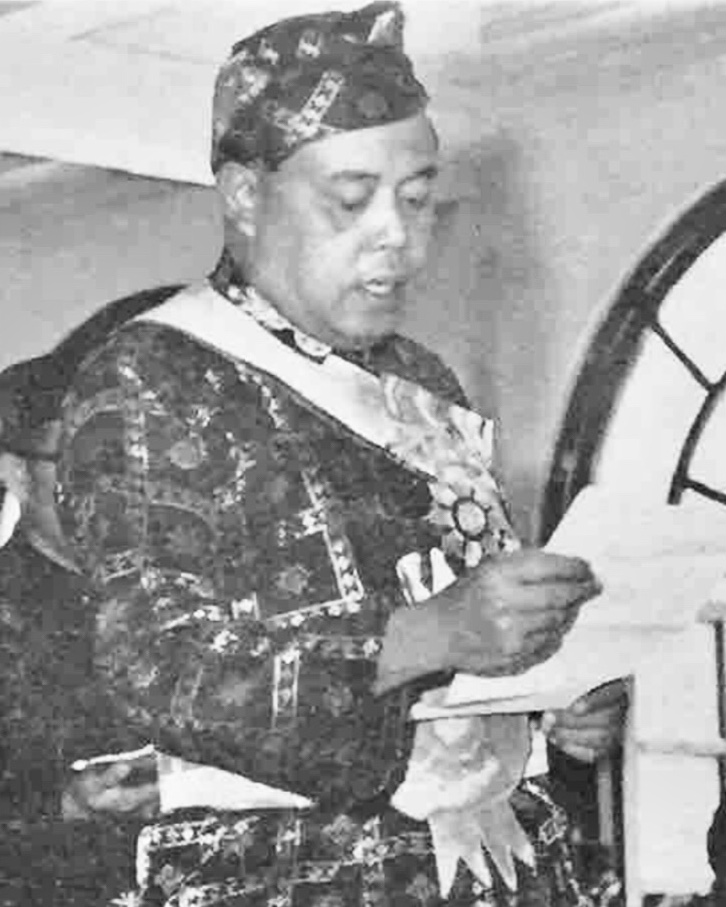
Pengiran Anak Mohamed Alam, Pemancha

== Wazir ==
The vizier must be a member of the Royal Family, namely one of the royal princes who is gahara (pure descendants of the sultan), as stated in Chapter 2 (1) of the Proclamation to Lift and Appoint Regent from 1959. Pengiran-Pengiran Kebanyakan, however, may also be given the title of vizier with the Sultan's consent. A ceremony known as mengarak is used to designate someone as vizier and bestow the appropriate title.

Title (Note: This column is arranged in order of seniority.)	Hierarchy	Incumbent	Date	Predecessor
Pengiran Perdana Wazir Sahibul Himmah Wal-Waqar	Kepala Wazir	Duli Yang Teramat Mulia Paduka Seri Pengiran Perdana Wazir Sahibul Himmah Wal-Waqar Pengiran Muda Mohamed Bolkiah ibni Al-Marhum Sultan Haji Omar 'Ali Saifuddien Sa'adul Khairi Waddien	6 February 1970	Title established
Pengiran Bendahara Seri Maharaja Permaisuara	Wazir	Duli Yang Teramat Mulia Paduka Seri Pengiran Bendahara Seri Maharaja Permaisuara Pengiran Muda Haji Sufri Bolkiah ibni Al-Marhum Sultan Haji Omar 'Ali Saifuddien Sa'adul Khairi Waddien	14 November 1979	Yang Teramat Mulia Seri Paduka Pengiran Bendahara Seri Maharaja Permaisuara Pengiran Muda Haji Hashim ibni Al-Marhum Pengiran Bendahara Pengiran Anak Abdul Rahman
Pengiran Di-Gadong Sahibul Mal	Wazir	Duli Yang Teramat Mulia Paduka Seri Pengiran Di-Gadong Sahibul Mal Pengiran Muda Haji Jefri Bolkiah ibni Al-Marhum Sultan Haji Omar 'Ali Saifuddien Sa'adul Khairi Waddien	14 November 1979	Yang Teramat Mulia Seri Paduka Pengiran Di-Gadong Sahibul Mal Pengiran Anak Haji Khamis ibni Al-Marhum Sultan Hashim Jalilul Alam Aqamaddin
Pengiran Pemancha Sahibul Rae' Wal-Mashuarah	Wazir	Vacant	-	Yang Teramat Mulia Seri Paduka Pengiran Pemancha Sahibul Rae' Wal-Mashuarah Pengiran Anak Haji Mohamed Alam ibni Al-Marhum Pengiran Bendahara Pengiran Anak Abdul Rahman
Pengiran Temenggong Sahibul Bahar	Wazir	Vacant	-	Yang Teramat Mulia Seri Paduka Pengiran Temenggong Sahibul Bahar Pengiran Haji Mohammad bin Pengiran Abdul Rahman Piut

== See also ==
- Cheteria
- Manteri
- Council of Cabinet Ministers
