= List of public housing estates in Brunei =

This is a list of public housing estates in Brunei. The list consists of housing estates under the current government housing programmes of the National Housing Scheme (Malay: Rancangan Perumahan Negara), including the Landless Indigenous Citizens' Housing Scheme (Malay: Skim Tanah Kurnia Rakyat Jati), as well as the former National Resettlement Scheme (Malay: Rancangan Perpindahan Negara). The housing estates may be part of village subdivisions, the third-level subdivisions of Brunei, but many of them have large enough population and hence are designated as separate villages; a few may even very large population that they are divided into few village subdivisions.

Public housing estates in Brunei
Estate	Area	Village subdivision	District
Perpindahan of Berakas	Berakas	Anggerek Desa	Brunei-Muara
Perpindahan of Berakas	Berakas	Burong Pingai Berakas	Brunei-Muara
Perpindahan of Berakas	Berakas	Pancha Delima	Brunei-Muara
Perpindahan of Berakas	Berakas	Pengiran Siraja Muda Delima Satu	Brunei-Muara
Perpindahan of Berakas	Berakas	Jaya Bakti	Brunei-Muara
Perpindahan of Berakas	Berakas	Jaya Setia	Brunei-Muara
Perpindahan of Berakas	Berakas	Orang Kaya Besar Imas	Brunei-Muara
Perpindahan of Bunut	Bunut	Bunut Perpindahan	Brunei-Muara
Lugu National Housing Scheme	Lugu	part of Lugu	Brunei-Muara
Lumapas Indigenous Citizens' Housing (also known as Kilugus Indigenous Citizens' Housing)	Lumapas / Kilugus	Lumapas Landless Indigenous Citizens' Housing Scheme (also Kilugus Landless Indigenous Citizens' Housing Scheme)	Brunei-Muara
Lambak Kanan National Housing Scheme (also known as Perpindahan of Lambak Kanan)	Lambak Kanan	Lambak Kanan National Housing Area 1	Brunei-Muara
Lambak Kanan National Housing Scheme (also known as Perpindahan of Lambak Kanan)	Lambak Kanan	Lambak Kanan National Housing Area 2	Brunei-Muara
Lambak Kanan National Housing Scheme (also known as Perpindahan of Lambak Kanan)	Lambak Kanan	Lambak Kanan National Housing Area 3	Brunei-Muara
Lambak Kanan National Housing Scheme (also known as Perpindahan of Lambak Kanan)	Lambak Kanan	Lambak Kanan National Housing Area 4	Brunei-Muara
Lambak Kanan National Housing Scheme (also known as Perpindahan of Lambak Kanan)	Lambak Kanan	Lambak Kanan National Housing Area 5	Brunei-Muara
Lambak Kiri Landless Indigenous Citizens' Housing Scheme	Lambak Kiri	Lambak Kiri Landless Indigenous Citizens' Housing Scheme	Brunei-Muara
Mata Mata Indigenous Citizens' Housing (also known as Katok 'B' Indigenous Citizens' Housing)	Mata-Mata / Katok 'B'	Mata-Mata (Katok 'B') Landless Indigenous Citizens' Housing Scheme Area 1	Brunei-Muara
Mata Mata Indigenous Citizens' Housing (also known as Katok 'B' Indigenous Citizens' Housing)	Mata-Mata / Katok 'B'	Mata-Mata (Katok 'B') Landless Indigenous Citizens' Housing Scheme Area 2	Brunei-Muara
Mata Mata Indigenous Citizens' Housing (also known as Katok 'B' Indigenous Citizens' Housing)	Mata-Mata / Katok 'B'	Mata-Mata (Katok 'B') Landless Indigenous Citizens' Housing Scheme Area 3	Brunei-Muara
Perpindahan Mata-Mata Indigenous Citizens' Housing	Mata-Mata	Perpindahan Mata-Mata	Brunei-Muara
Perpindahan of Mata-Mata	Mata-Mata	Perpindahan Mata-Mata	Brunei-Muara
Mentiri National Housing Scheme	Mentiri	Mentiri National Housing Area 'A'	Brunei-Muara
Mentiri National Housing Scheme	Mentiri	Mentiri National Housing Area 'B'	Brunei-Muara
Meragang National Housing	Meragang	Meragang National Housing	Brunei-Muara
Panchor National Housing Scheme (commonly known as Mengkubau National Housing Scheme)	Panchor	Panchor	Brunei-Muara
Rimba Landless Indigenous Citizens' Housing Scheme	Rimba	Rimba Landless Indigenous Citizens' Housing Scheme	Brunei-Muara
Rimba National Housing Scheme	Rimba	Rimba National Housing Scheme Area 1	Brunei-Muara
Rimba National Housing Scheme	Rimba	Rimba National Housing Scheme Area 2	Brunei-Muara
Rimba National Housing Scheme	Rimba	Rimba National Housing Scheme Area 3	Brunei-Muara
Rimba National Housing Scheme	Rimba	Rimba National Housing Scheme Area 4	Brunei-Muara
Rimba National Housing Scheme	Rimba	Rimba National Housing Scheme Area 5	Brunei-Muara
Perpindahan of Serasa	Serasa	Perpindahan Serasa	Brunei-Muara
Sungai Buloh Indigenous Citizens' Housing	Sungai Buloh	part of Sungai Buloh	Brunei-Muara
Tanah Jambu Indigenous Citizens' Housing	Tanah Jambu	parts of Tanah Jambu	Brunei-Muara
Tanah Jambu National Housing	Tanah Jambu	parts of Tanah Jambu	Brunei-Muara
Tungku Indigenous Citizens' Housing	Tungku	Tungku Landless Indigenous Citizens' Housing Scheme Area 1	Brunei-Muara
Tungku Indigenous Citizens' Housing	Tungku	Tungku Landless Indigenous Citizens' Housing Scheme Area 2	Brunei-Muara
Tungku Indigenous Citizens' Housing	Tungku / Katok 'A'	Tungku Landless Indigenous Citizens' Housing Scheme Area 3 (also known as Katok 'A' Landless Indigenous Citizens' Housing Scheme)	Brunei-Muara
Lumut National Housing	Lumut	Lumut National Housing Area 1	Belait
Lumut National Housing	Lumut	Lumut National Housing Area 2	Belait
Mumong Indigenous Citizens' Housing	Mumong	Mumong 'A'	Belait
Panaga National Housing	Panaga	part of Panaga	Belait
Pandan National Housing	Pandan	part of Pandan 'A'	Belait
Pandan National Housing	Pandan	part of Pandan 'B'	Belait
Pandan National Housing	Pandan	part of Pandan 'C'	Belait
Lorong Tengah National Housing	Seria	Lorong Tengah Seria National Housing	Belait
Lorong Tiga Selatan Indigenous Citizens' Housing	Seria	Lorong Tiga Selatan	Belait
Bukit Beruang National Housing (also known as Perpindahan of Bukit Beruang)	Bukit Beruang	part of Bukit Beruang (also known as Perpindahan Bukit Beruang)	Tutong
Telisai Indigenous Citizens' Housing	Telisai	part of Telisai	Tutong
Rataie Indigenous Citizens' Housing	Rataie	Rataie	Temburong
Rataie National Housing	Rataie	Rataie	Temburong
