= Kampong Katok =

Village in Brunei

- Village
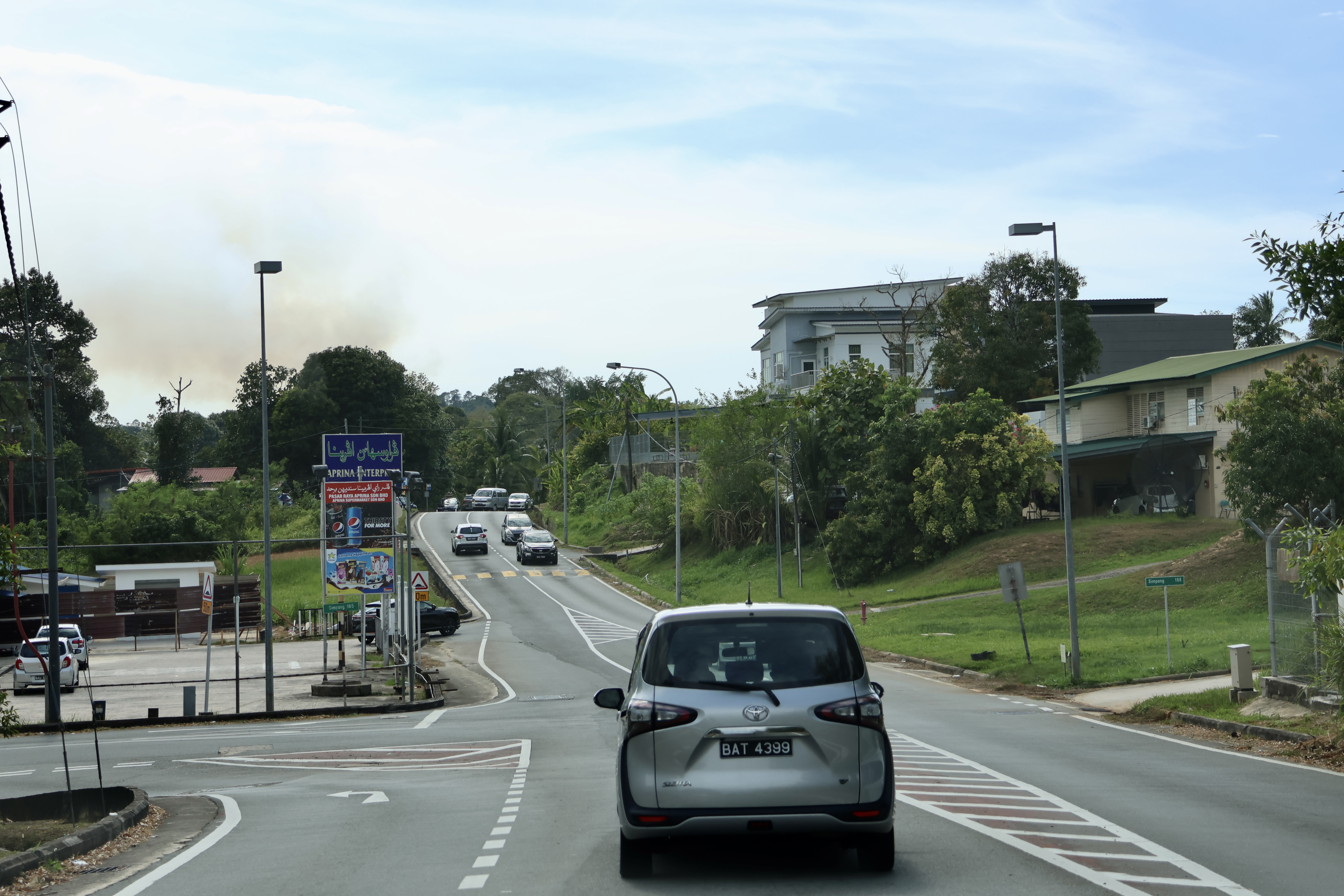
- Jalan Tungku

- Location in Brunei
- Coordinates: 4°54′54″N 114°53′34″E
- Country: Brunei
- District: Brunei-Muara
- Mukim: Gadong 'A'

Government
  - Village head: Ismail Rejab

Population (2016)
  - Total: 2,079
- Time zone: UTC+8 (BNT)
- Postcode: BE2319

Kampong Katok is a village in Brunei-Muara District, Brunei, about 8 kilometres (5.0 mi) from the capital Bandar Seri Begawan. The population was 2,079 in 2016. It is one of the villages within Mukim Gadong 'A'. The postcode is BE2319.

== Geography ==
The village is located on the outskirts of the municipal area of the country's capital Bandar Seri Begawan, and about 8 kilometres (5.0 mi) from its city centre.

As a village subdivision, it borders Kampong Tungku and STKRJ Katok 'A' to the north, STKRJ Tungku Area 1 to the north-east, Kampong Mata-Mata to the east and south, Area 2 of STKRJ Mata-Mata to the south, Kampong Tanjong Bunut to the south-west, Kampong Selayun to the west, and Kampong Peninjau to the north-west.

== Administration ==
Kampong Katok shares a village head (ketua kampung) with the neighbouring village Kampong Tungku.

== Economy ==
Efforts made by the residents of Kampong Tungku and Katok through animal husbandry or more precisely producing kelulut honey. The production of kelulut honey is planned to be the brand of the village's product, especially in response to the government's call to make one product one village, given the growing involvement of the population and their liking for it. The Ketua Kampong Tungku/Katok explained that, seeing the development through animal husbandry, the members of the Village Consultative Council (MPK) suggested that it be made a trademark of the village's product and it was well received.

== Address ==
The location address for the public housing estates STKRJ Katok 'A' and STKRJ Katok 'B', as well as the schools Katok Secondary School and Raja Isteri Pengiran Anak Hajah Saleha Girls' Arabic Religious Secondary School which are located in STKRJ Katok 'B', is often regarded as located in the village, even though they are not within the village boundary. The aforementioned public housing estates are designated as separate village subdivisions.
