= Kampong Tungku =

Village in Brunei

- Village
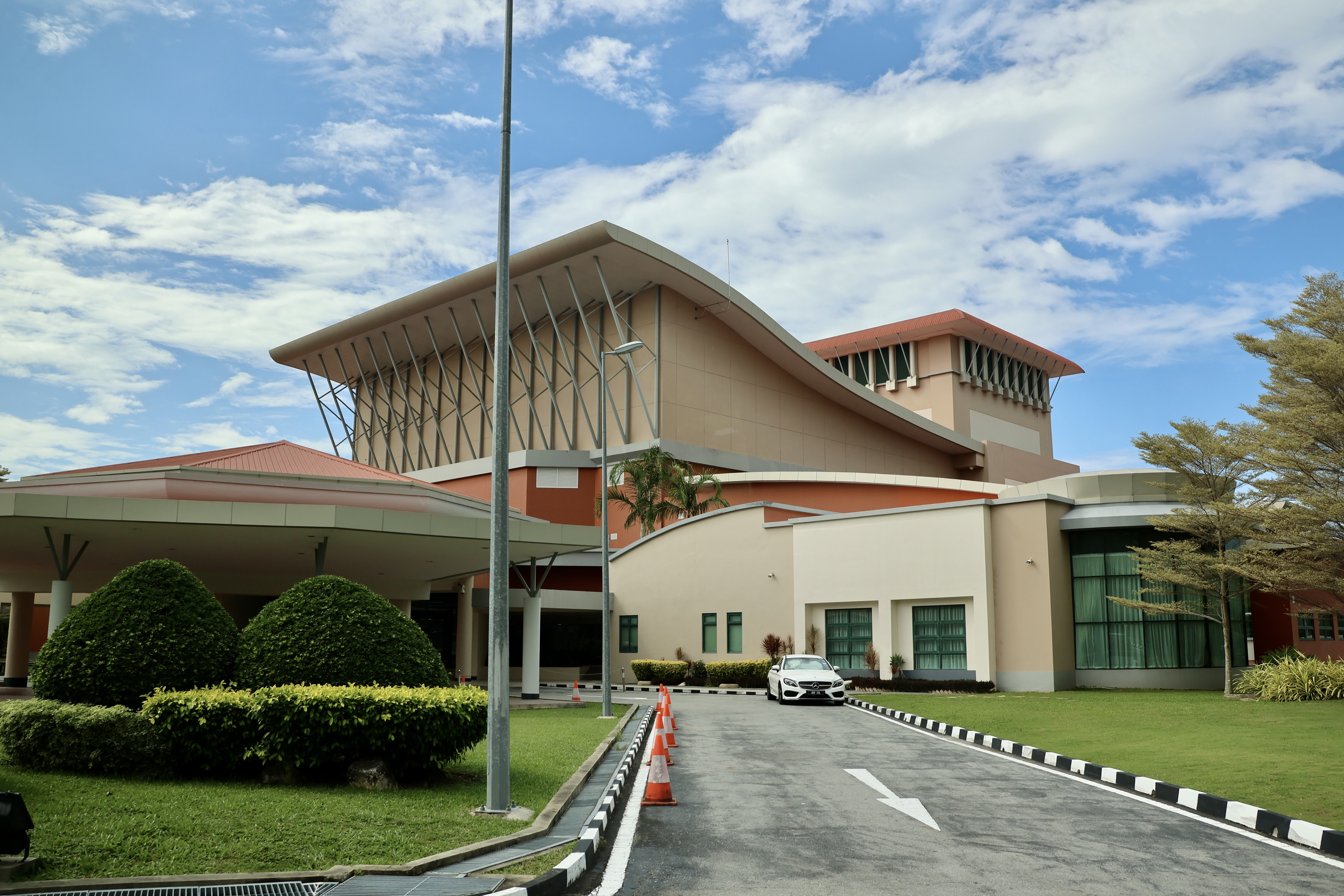
- Jerudong International School

- Location in Brunei
- Coordinates: 4°55′50″N 114°53′02″E
- Country: Brunei
- District: Brunei-Muara
- Mukim: Gadong 'A'

Government
  - Village head: Ismail Rejab

Population (2016)
  - Total: 1,689
- Time zone: UTC+8 (BNT)
- Postcode: BE2119

Kampong Tungku is a village in Brunei-Muara District, Brunei, about 10 kilometres (6.2 mi) from the capital Bandar Seri Begawan. The population was 1,689 in 2016. It is one of the villages within Mukim Gadong 'A'. The postcode is BE2119.

== Geography ==
The village is located on the outskirts of the municipal area of the country's capital Bandar Seri Begawan, and about 10 kilometres (6.2 mi) from its city centre.

As a village subdivision, it borders Kampong Rimba to the north-east; Area 1 and Area 5 of RPN Kampong Rimba, and STKRJ Kampong Rimba to the east; Area 1 and Area 2 of STKRJ Kampong Tungku to the south-east; Kampong Katok and STKRJ Kampong Katok 'A' to the south; and Kampong Peninjau to the west. It also borders the South China Sea to the north.

== Administration ==
Kampong Tungku shares a village head (ketua kampung) with the neighbouring village Kampong Katok.

== Economy ==
Efforts made by the residents of Kampong Tungku and Katok through animal husbandry or more precisely producing kelulut honey. The production of kelulut honey is planned to be the brand of the village's product, especially in response to the government's call to make one product one village, given the growing involvement of the population and their liking for it. The Ketua Kampong Tungku/Katok explained that, seeing the development through animal husbandry, the members of the Village Consultative Council (MPK) suggested that it be made a trademark of the village's product and it was well received.

=== Rimba Digital Junction ===
The Rimba Digital Junction, a Brunei Economic Development Board (BEDB) initiative, aims to create a cluster for information and communication technology and high-tech industries on a 15 hectares (37 acres) site near the RPN Kampong Rimba. Initially considered as a potential location for a new district hospital, the site was ultimately designated for the digital junction. In 2012, the government announced a joint venture with Canadian-based CAE to develop a world-class multi-purpose training centre (MPTC) at the site. The MPTC is designed to provide training across various sectors, including defense, aerospace, emergency management, healthcare, and energy, with modern facilities such as flight simulators. It will also offer specialised training to support Brunei's growing oil and gas exploration and production activities.

=== Agro Technology Park ===
To assist creative, tech-driven companies in the agro sectors, especially in the food industry, the Brunei government is developing the Brunei Agro Technology Park (BATP). Situated on a 500 hectares plot of land in Kampung Tungku, the park seeks to give both domestic and foreign businesses access to a cutting-edge platform. Business spaces, government labs, a Food Development Center, a Halal Science Center, food processing incubators, and the first phase of botanic gardens are all part of Phase 1A, which started in January 2011 and is anticipated to be finished in 2013. Roads, high-voltage cables, and substations are all part of the park's infrastructure, which supports small and medium-sized businesses, the halal sector, food security, and biodiversity development.

== Infrastructures ==
=== Roads ===
Road access to the village is served by Jalan Tungku from the south-east, and Jalan Rakyat Jati Rimba and the Tungku–Jerudong Highway from the north. Jalan Tungku is the main road in the settlement which traverses the area in the north-west–south-east direction. Jalan Rakyat Jati Rimba and the Tungku–Jerudong Highway terminate in Tungku at a roundabout junction with Jalan Tungku north of the settlement.

=== Education ===
The village's government primary school is Tungku Primary School. It also shares grounds with Tungku Religious School, the village's government school for the country's Islamic religious primary education.

The following educational institutions are located within the village's administrative boundary:

- University of Brunei Darussalam (UBD), the country's national university
- University of Technology Brunei (UTB), the country's institute of technology
- Jerudong International School, one of the few international schools in the country and offers British curriculum
- The Mechanical Campus of the Institute of Brunei Technical Education (IBTE)

=== Religion ===
Pengiran Muda Abdul Malik Mosque is the village mosque, which is also shared with the residents of Kampong Katok. It was inaugurated on 27 July 2012 by Sultan Hassanal Bolkiah, the Sultan of Brunei. The mosque has a capacity for 1,000 worshippers. It is named after Prince Abdul Malik, a son of Sultan Hassanal Bolkiah with the queen consort Queen Saleha.
