= STKRJ Tungku Area 2 =

Public housing estate in Brunei

STKRJ Tungku Area 2 Skim Tanah Kurnia Rakyat Jati Kampung Tungku Kawasan 2
- Public housing estate and village
- Location in Brunei
- Coordinates: 4°55′45″N 114°53′12″E
- Country: Brunei
- District: Brunei-Muara
- Mukim: Gadong 'A'

Government
  - Village head: Pengiran Mahmod Fakhrul Razi

Population (2016)
  - Total: 1,862
- Time zone: UTC+8 (BNT)
- Postcode: BE2719

STKRJ Tungku Area 2 is a public housing estate and village within Mukim Gadong 'A' in Brunei-Muara District, Brunei. The population was 1,862 in 2016. The postcode is BE2519. It is one of the estates for the Landless Indigenous Citizens' Housing Scheme (Skim Tanah Kurnia Rakyat Jati, STKRJ), the public housing programme for the country's indigenous citizens (rakyat jati).

== Geography ==
The estate is located on the outskirts of the municipal area of Bandar Seri Begawan, the country's capital, and about 9 kilometres (5.6 mi) from its city centre. As a village subdivision, it borders Kampong Tungku to the north, south and west, and STKRJ Kampong Rimba to the east.

It is one of the STKRJ estates named after the nearby village Kampong Tungku.

== See also ==
- STKRJ Tungku Area 1
- Kampong Tungku
- STKRJ Kampong Katok 'A'
