= Mukim Berakas 'A' =

- Mukim
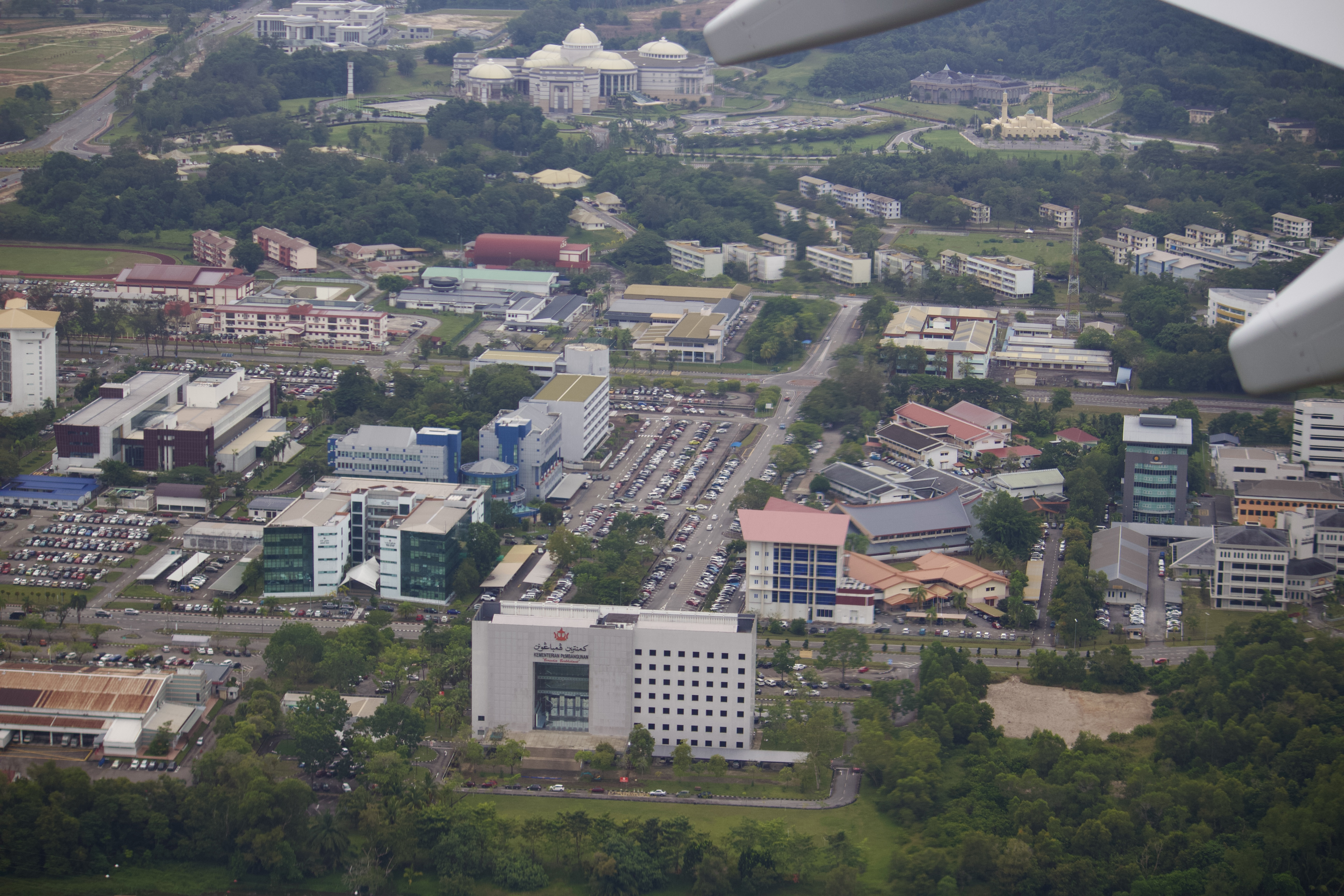
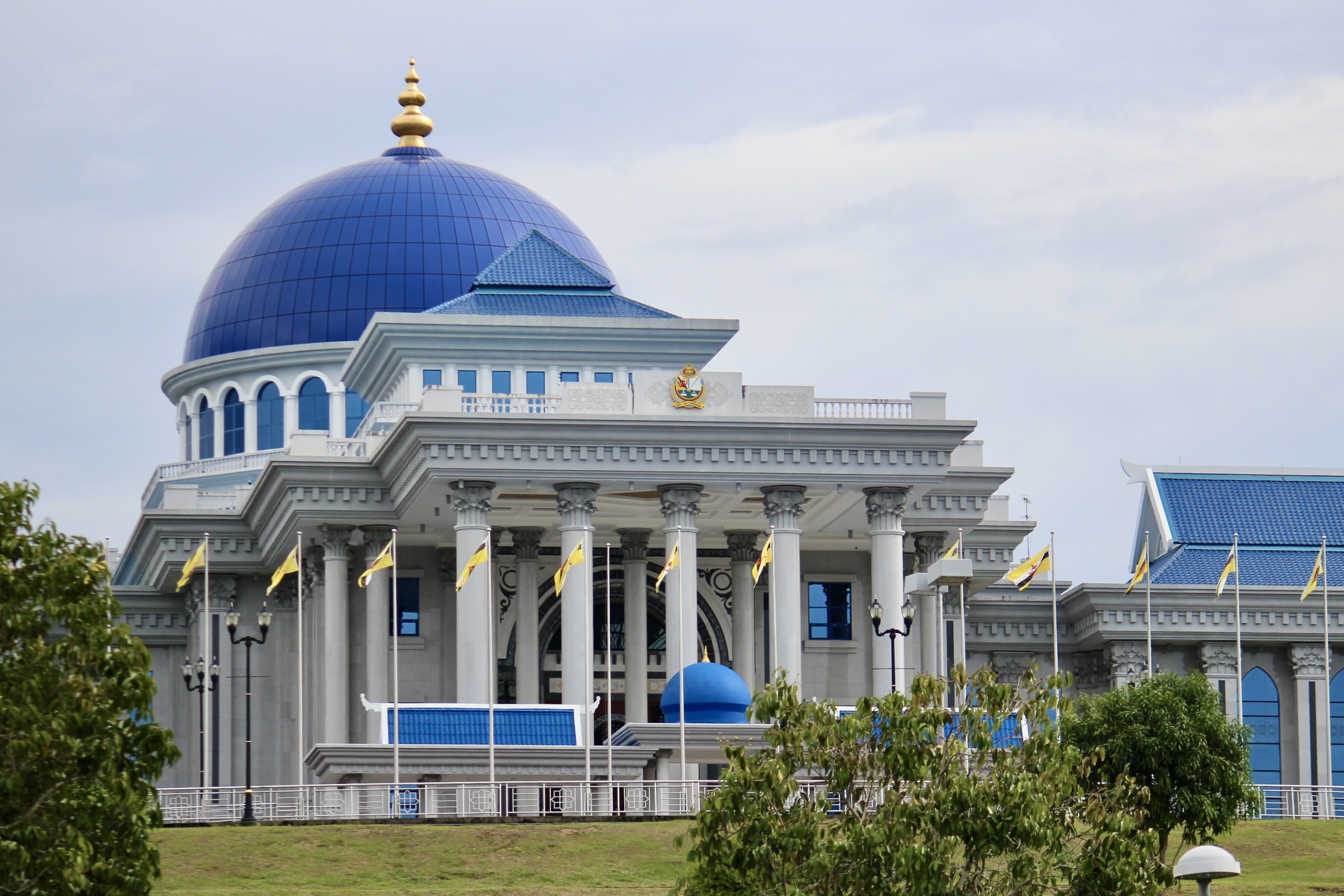
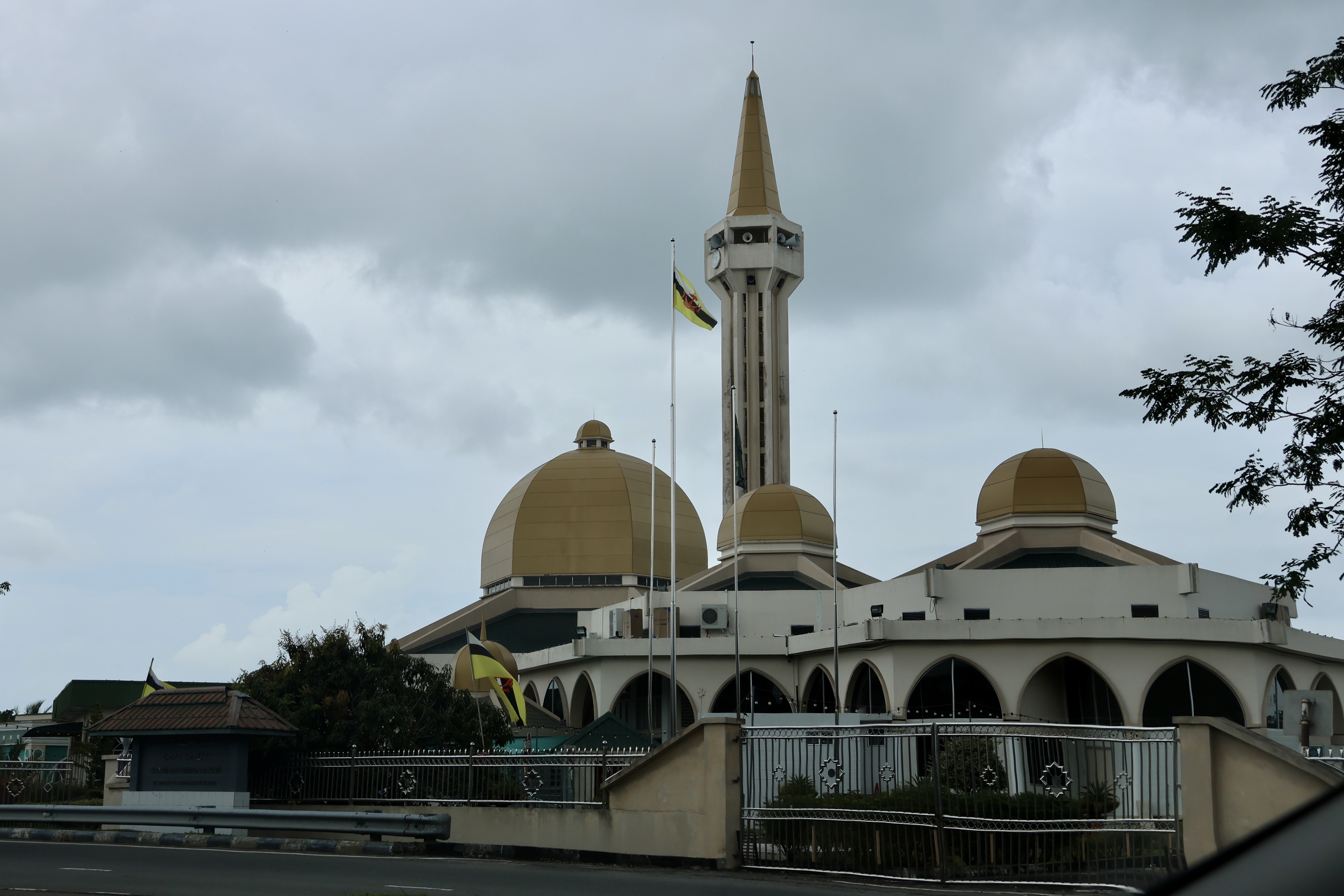
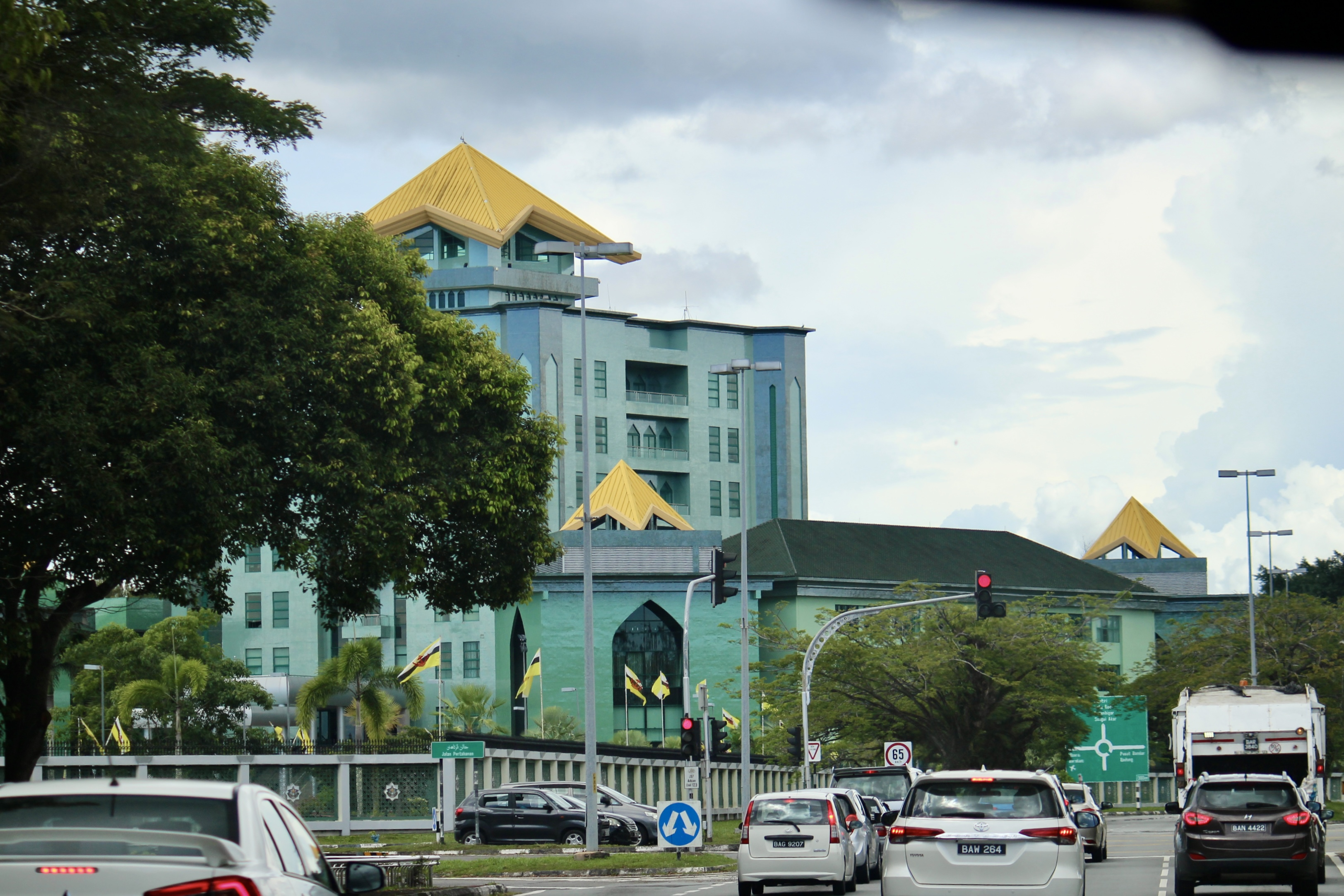
- Clockwise from top left: Old Airport, Legislative Building, Ministry of Defence, Serusop

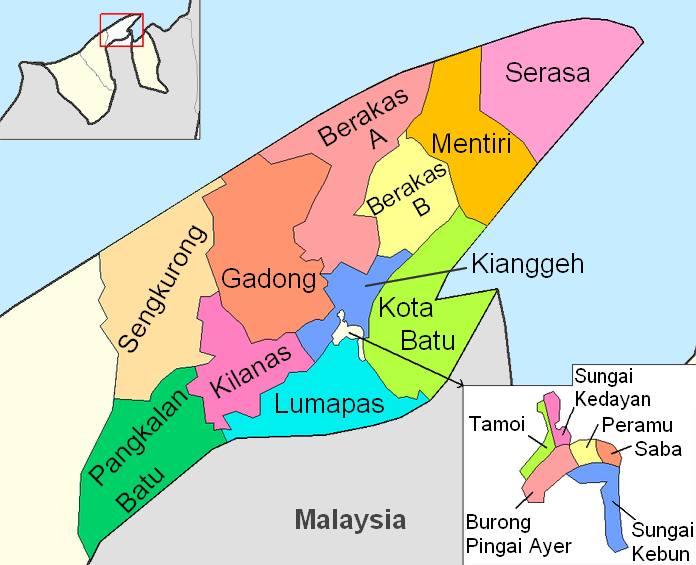
- Berakas 'A' is in salmon pink.
- Coordinates: 04°57′43″N 114°56′10″E
- Country: Brunei Darussalam
- District: Brunei-Muara
- Established: 1996

Government
  - Penghulu: Omar Dollah

Population (2021)
  - Total: 28,311
- Time zone: UTC+8 (BNT)
- Postcode: BBxx13, BBxx14

Mukim Berakas 'A' is a mukim in Brunei-Muara District, Brunei Darussalam. The population was 27,223 in 2016.

== Etymology ==
People from the Kampong Ayer used to travel to the Berakas to get firewood before resettlement. Only a jungle at that time, they wrapped the woods when they had gathered them. In Brunei Malay, the act of bundling the woods is known as berkas. As word spread about memberakas kayu (to gather firewood), Berakas was established as the location where people go.

== Geography ==
The mukim borders the South China Sea to its north, Mukim Mentiri and Mukim Berakas 'B' to its east, Mukim Kianggeh to its south, Mukim Gadong 'B' to its south-west, and Mukim Gadong 'A' to its west.

== Administration ==
Mukim Berakas 'A' encompasses the following populated settlements:

Settlements	Population (2021)	Ketua kampung (2024)
Kampong Jaya Setia	939	Abdul Hafiz bin Haji Abdul Manan
Kampong Jaya Bakti	402	Abdul Hafiz bin Haji Abdul Manan
Kampong Burong Pingai Berakas	586	Abdul Hafiz bin Haji Abdul Manan
Kampong Orang Kaya Besar Imas	1,059	Haji Omar bin Haji Dollah
Kampong Pancha Delima	1,548	Haji Omar bin Haji Dollah
Kampong Pengiran Siraja Muda Delima Satu	2,740	Pengiran Roslan bin Pengiran Tuah
Kampong Serusop	1,573	Pengiran Roslan bin Pengiran Tuah
Kampong Lambak 'A'	4,471	Haji Brahim bin Haji Abd Rahman
Kampong Lambak 'B'	3,760	Pengiran Jofri bin Pengiran Haji Zaidi
Kampong Lambak Kiri	2,521	Awangku Aminur Aminuddin bin Pengiran Haji Mohd Salleh
STKRJ Lambak Kiri	2,296	Muhammad Redzuan Shah bin Haji Matali
Kampong Terunjing	881	—N/a
Berakas Camp	2,650	—N/a
Government Departments and Housing Areas	734	—N/a
Brunei International Airport	20	—N/a
Kampong Pulaie	405	Pengiran Wasli bin Pengiran Zohari
Kampong Anggerek Desa	1,726	Pengiran Wasli bin Pengiran Zohari

== History ==
In the late 1940s, Mukim Berakas was primarily made up of forest land. It took some time before additional people moved in; first, just the Kedayans resided here. In the 1950s, when they initially started settling in this region, lands in the Anggerek Desa and Burong Pingai were allotted under the first Kampong Ayer resettlement scheme. The mukim and Mukim Berakas 'B' were originally one mukim by the name 'Mukim Berakas' before being split into the current divisions in 1996.

Warta Mukim Berakas 'A' was launched on 29 January 1997 by the then Brunei and Muara District Officer, Dato Paduka Haji Mohd. Kassim. This newspaper displays news materials about the activities around Mukim Berakas 'A'. This newspaper is one of the information media for Penghulu and Ketua Kampong Mukim Berakas 'A' in highlighting the activities held, in addition to containing the histories and successes achieved by the villagers.

== Economy ==
Among the products and services worked in this mukim are woven cloth, making songkok, sweets, and welding. One of the businesses that often become the focus of this district is renting wedding dresses. One of the villages in this sub-district has also been selected to participate in the national-level Outstanding Village Award, which is the Village Consultation Council of the Kurnia Rakyat Land Scheme Jati Lambak Kiri. The village has introduced Tamu Lawak Oil products at the awards. This product has managed to get a lot of demand both from home and abroad where it is often used as a massage oil.

Mukim Berakas 'A' products have also been exhibited in conjunction with the departure of Sultan Hassanal Bolkiah in conjunction with the Completion Ceremony for the Awarding of the Keys to the Children of Meragang Houses, Semi-detached Houses, and Terraced Houses in Tanah Jambu and Panchor (Mengkubau) under the National Housing Plan (RPN), and Semi-detached Houses and Terraced Houses in Mata-Mata (Katok 'B'), as well as Lugu Terraced Houses under the Land Scheme of the People's Gift of Brunei (STKRJ) for the Brunei-Muara District, on 24 January 2015. The exhibition was held at the home of the Ketua Kampong Pancha Delima/Kampung Anggerek Desa, namely Awang Haji Zulkifli bin Haji Awang Ya'akub who is also the Acting Ketua Kampong Orang Kaya Imas / Pulaie, that is right after awarding the children the keys to the house.

== Demography ==
As of 2016 census, the population of Mukim Berakas 'A' comprised 14,193 males and 13,030 females. The mukim had 5,186 households occupying 5,071 dwellings. The entire population lived in urban areas. According to the Preliminary Report of the 2011 Population and Housing Census (BPP), Mukim Berakas has 31,180 residents with 5,321 dwellings.

This mukim is also active in performing Bruneian Malay art such as berdong, poetry, poetry recitation, traditional dance, native Malay songs to defend and elevate the cultural dignity of Bruneians. Meanwhile, in order to instil a sense of patriotism towards the country, residents of Mukim Berakas 'A' have also held a Brunei Darussalam Flag Raising Ceremony in conjunction with the 29th National Day Anniversary Celebration which took place at the grounds of Datu Mahawangsa Lambak Primary School.

== Infrastructure ==
Berakas 'A' mukim also have facilities provided by the government, such as mosques, schools, clinics, water supply, electricity, telephones, and roads. The progress in terms of infrastructure in this sub-district also stands out with the presence of government buildings and various shopping centre buildings that are often the focus of the public.

== See also ==
- Mukim Berakas 'B'
