= STKRJ Kampong Lambak Kiri =

- Public housing estate and village
- Location in Brunei Darussalam
- Coordinates: 4°59′08″N 114°56′24″E
- Country: Brunei Darussalam
- District: Brunei-Muara
- Mukim: Berakas 'A'

Area
  - Total: 81 ha (200 acres)

Population (2016)
  - Total: 2,593
  - Density: 3,200/km^{2} (8,300/sq mi)
- Time zone: UTC+8 (BNT)
- Postcode: BB1114

Skim Tanah Kurnia Rakyat Jati (STKRJ) Kampung Lambak Kiri is a public housing estate and located village in the north of Brunei-Muara District in Brunei Darussalam. The population was 2,593 in 2016. It is one of the villages within Mukim Berakas 'A'. Its postcode is BB1114.

== History ==
The residents of STKRJ Lambak Kiri started moving in 1992 to 1993. There are two types of housing available here, which are stone and wooden types. This settlement includes residential areas in STKRJ, Berakas Garrison, and Kampong Lambak Kiri. It has an area of 1,616.45 hectares.

== Economy ==
Tamu Lawak Oil (Temulawak Oil) is a product named as 'One Village One Product' (1K1P) in STKRJ Lambak Kiri and its surroundings. It is further expanded its production by Majlis Perundingan Kampung (MPK) together with the manufacturer of the product. The MPK receives donations continuously as a result of the sale. MPK STKRJ Lambak Kiri and the surrounding area also help in marketing related products by participating in exhibitions and sales. Tamu Lawak oil or in its scientific name is curcuma zanthorrhiza is a type of herbal plant that can be found in Brunei. This Tamu Lawak oil can be said to be the first massage oil in the country produced and produced by a local daughter company, and made into a 1K1P Project that has been carried out and achieved success both nationally and regionally.

== See also ==
- Public housing in Brunei
