= STKRJ Katok 'B' =

Public housing estate in Brunei

STKRJ Katok 'B' Kampong Katok 'B' STKRJ Mata-Mata
- Public housing estate
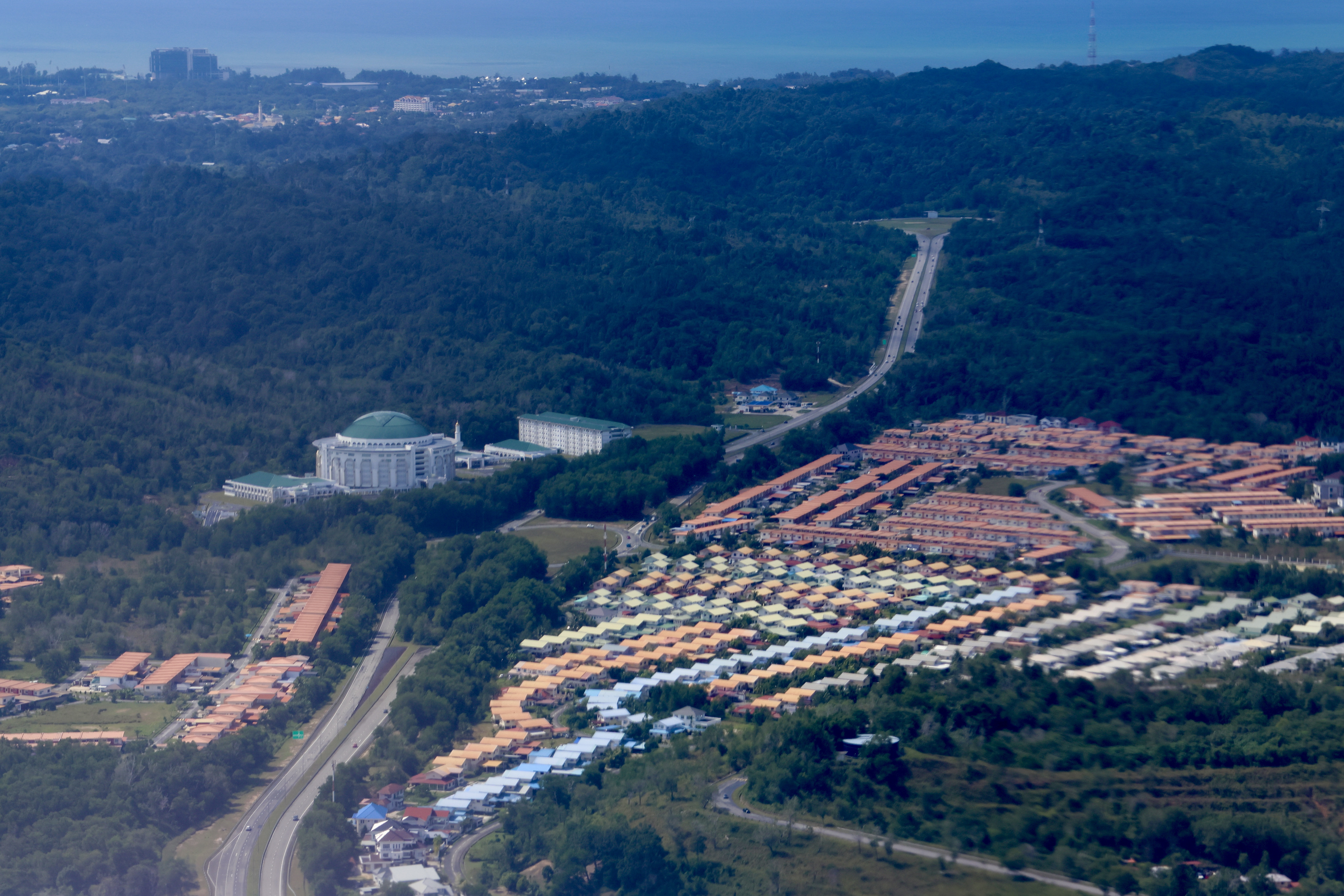

- Location in Brunei
- Coordinates: 4°54′00″N 114°52′30″E
- Country: Brunei
- District: Brunei-Muara
- Mukim: Gadong 'B'

Government
  - Village head: Pengiran Muhammad Redzuan

Population (2016) (Note: See Administration section.)
  - Total: 6,108
- Time zone: UTC+8 (BNT)

STKRJ Katok 'B' or Kampong Katok 'B', also known as STKRJ Mata-Mata, is a public housing estate in Brunei-Muara District, Brunei, about 11 kilometres (6.8 mi) from the country's capital Bandar Seri Begawan. The total population was 6,108 in 2016. It is one of the estates for the Landless Indigenous Citizens' Housing Scheme (Skim Tanah Kurnia Rakyat Jati, STKRJ), a public housing programme for the country's indigenous citizens (rakyat jati).

== Geography ==
The estate is located in the central part of Brunei-Muara District, as well as in the outskirts of the municipal area of Bandar Seri Begawan and about 11 kilometres (6.8 mi) from the capital's city centre. It neighbours Kampong Mata-Mata and Perpindahan Mata-Mata to the east.

It is one of the estates named after the village Kampong Katok, the other STKRJ Katok 'A'.

== Administration ==
For subdivision purposes, the estate is officially known as STKRJ Mata-Mata and has been divided into three areas and administered as villages:

Village	Population (2016)	Postcode	Mukim
STKRJ Mata-Mata Area 1	2,484	BE2118	Gadong 'B'
STKRJ Mata-Mata Area 2	2,159	BE2318	Gadong 'B'
STKRJ Mata-Mata Area 3	2,485	BE2518	Gadong 'B'
Total	7,128	-	

== Infrastructures ==
=== Schools ===
Katok 'B' Primary School is the estate's government primary school.

Other schools located in the area include:

- Katok Secondary School (Sekolah Menengah Katok) — a government secondary school. It was established in 2014 and as of 2017 had 1,180 students and 121 teachers. It is housed at what was formerly Katok Sixth Form Centre, a sixth form college, whereby the latter has been relocated to a new place in Mukim Sengkurong and renamed Sengkurong Sixth Form Centre. The school complex sits on a 12-acre (4.9 ha) land and was completed in 2008 at a cost of B$16.8 million (US$12.5 million as of September 2021). Some of the facilities include 41 classrooms, laboratories, gymnasium, theatre and library. It was established to alleviate overcrowding at Menglait Secondary School.
- Raja Isteri Pengiran Anak Hajah Saleha Girls' Arabic Religious Secondary School (Sekolah Ugama Arab Menengah Perempuan Raja Isteri Pengiran Anak Hajah Saleha, SUAMPRIPAHS) — a girls' government secondary school for the country's Arabic Islamic religious education. The construction began in 2015 and completed in 2017 at a cost of almost B$47 million (US$35 million as of September 2021); it can accommodate 1,800 students. The students and teachers are those relocated from Raja Isteri Pengiran Anak Damit Girls' Arabic Religious Secondary School (SUAMPRIPAD) in Batu Satu. As of 2018, it had 1,365 students and 133 teachers. It was initially known as Katok Arabic Secondary School (Sekolah Menengah Arab Katok) until it was renamed on 30 January 2017 on the royal command of Sultan Hassanal Bolkiah.

However, their location address is often attributed to Kampong Katok, even though they are located outside of the village boundary.
