= Panchor National Housing Scheme =

Mengkubau National Housing Scheme Rancangan Perumahan Negara Mengkubau Panchor National Housing Scheme
- Public housing estate
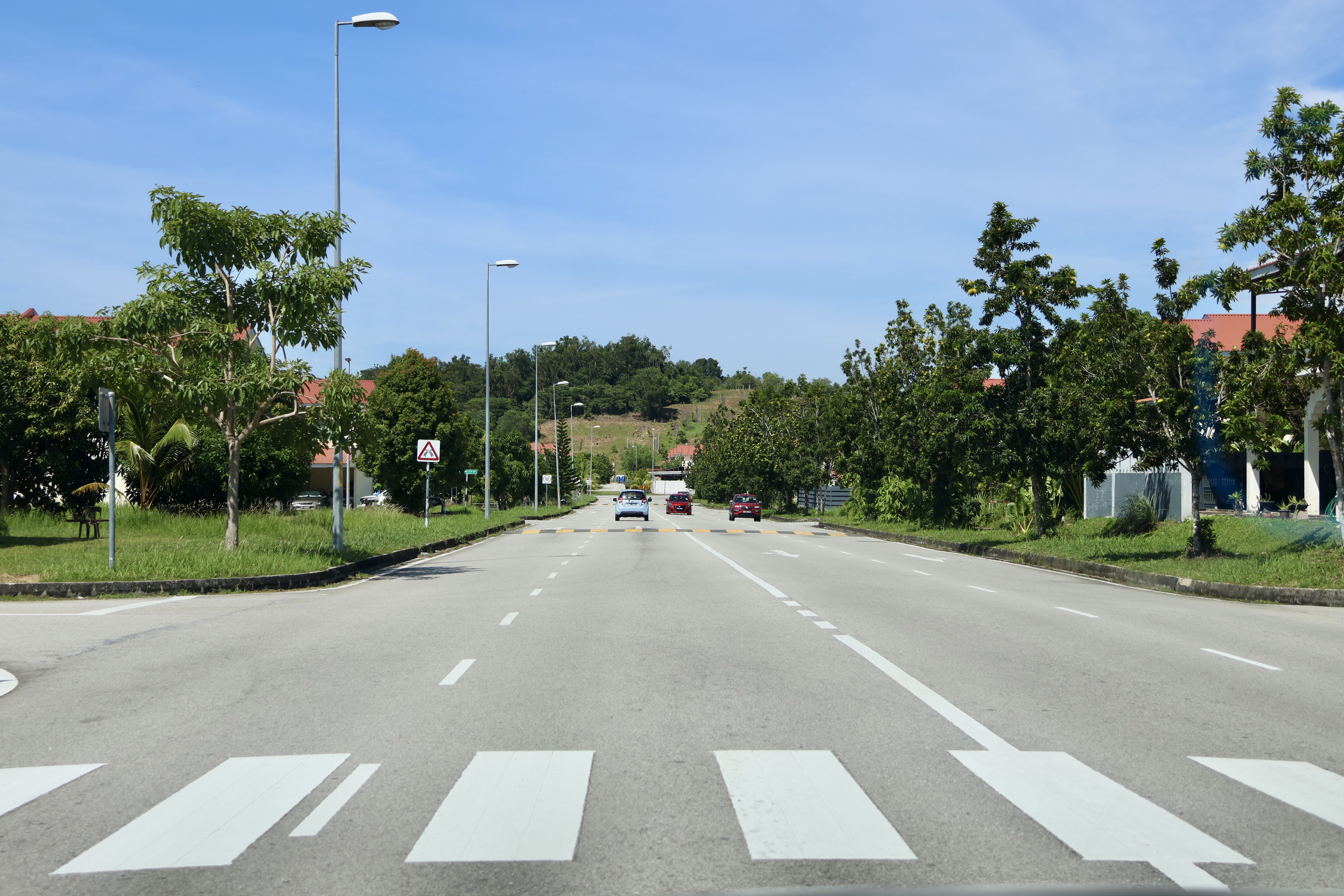
- Simpang 50

- Location in Brunei
- Coordinates: 4°58′37″N 115°00′40″E
- Country: Brunei
- District: Brunei-Muara
- Mukim: Mentiri

Government
  - Village head: Hilmy Ahmad (Area 1 & 3); Eddie Hardey (Area 2); Faidil Rosemady (Area 4); Hairul Azri (Area 5)

Mengkubau National Housing Scheme (Malay: Rancangan Perumahan Negara Mengkubau, abbreviated as RPN Mengkubau), commonly known as Panchor National Housing Scheme, is a public housing estate in Brunei-Muara District, Brunei, in the mukim (subdistrict) of Mentiri. It is one of the public housing estates of under the programme of its namesake, which is a government housing programme for the citizens of Brunei.

== History ==
In response to the increasing demand for housing, the Brunei Economic Development Board undertook three pilot projects to construct a total of 7,500 low-cost houses. The largest of these projects was located at Kampong Mengkubau, spanning 309 hectares (760 acres) and consisting of 4,000 houses. Construction began in February 2010, with completion expected by the first quarter of 2014. The development included two types of housing: 1,600 semi-detached units on 400 square metres (4,300 sq ft) lots and 2,400 terrace houses on 250 square metres (2,700 sq ft) lots, resulting in a higher development density compared to previous housing schemes in areas such as Lambak Kanan, Rimba, and Mentiri, which had focused on detached bungalows with larger lot sizes.
