= Mukim Gadong 'A' =

- Mukim
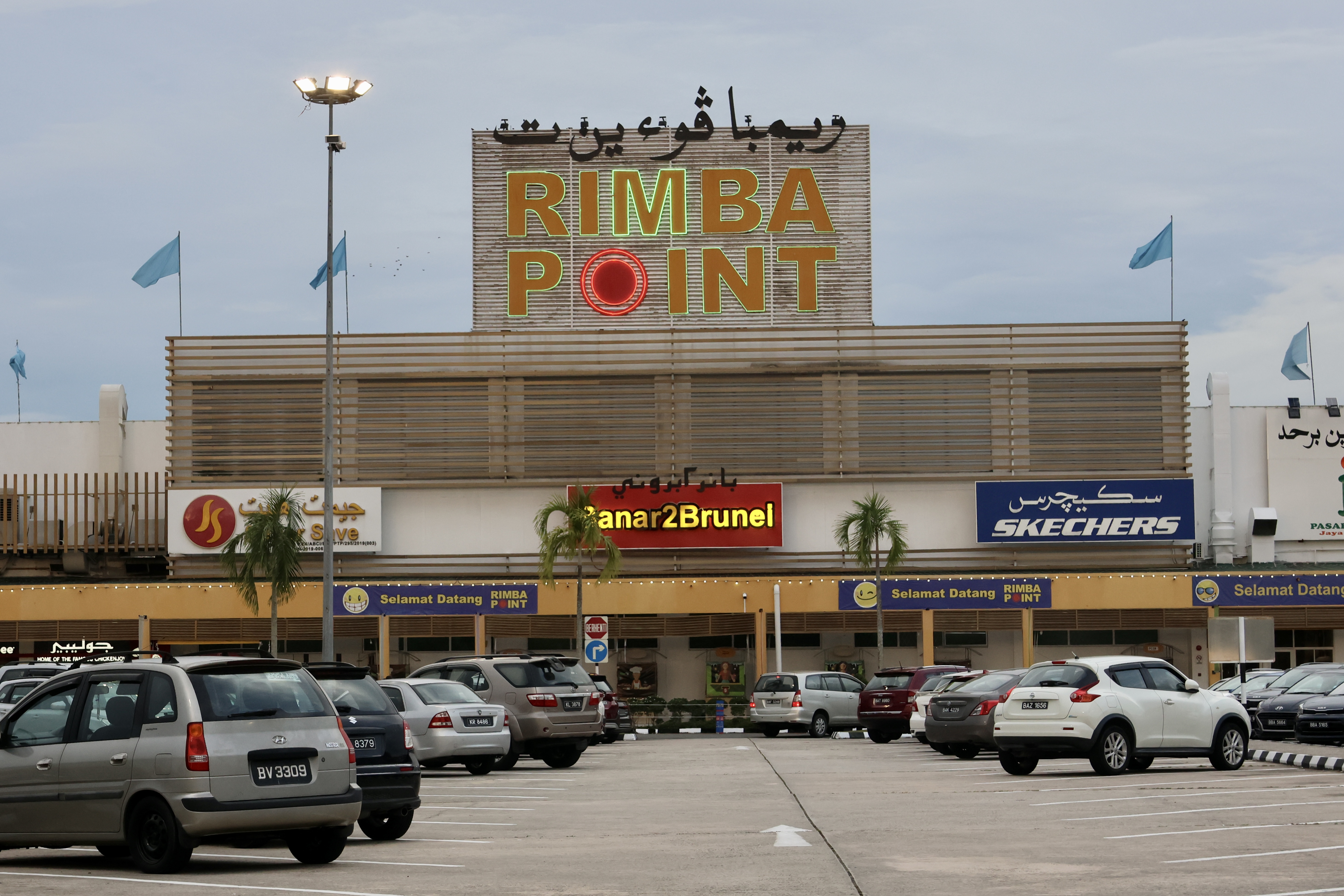
- Kampong Rimba

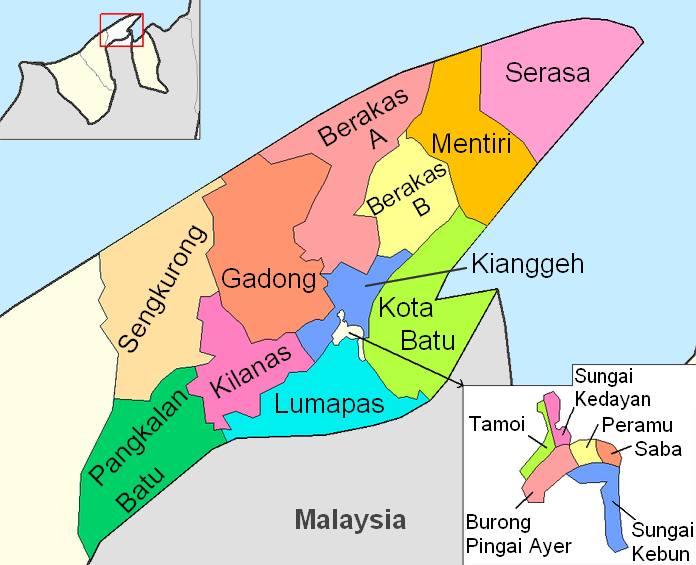
- Gadong is in peach.
- Coordinates: 4.5262°N 114.6193°E
- Country: Brunei
- District: Brunei-Muara
- Established: 21 November 2005

Government
  - Penghulu: Julkepli Ibrahim

Population (2021)
  - Total: 35,424
- Time zone: UTC+8 (BNT)
- Postcode: BExx19

Mukim Gadong 'A' (GAH-dong) is a mukim in Brunei-Muara District, Brunei. The population was 34,049 in 2016.

== Background ==
The mukim was established on 21 November 2005 with split of the former Mukim Gadong into this mukim and Mukim Gadong 'B'.

== Geography ==
The mukim borders the South China Sea to the north, Mukim Berakas 'A' to the east, Mukim Gadong 'B' to the south and Mukim Sengkurong to the west.

Some of the coastline of Mukim Gadong 'A' has been modified and added with 'land extensions' towards the sea of various shapes and sizes, especially near the surroundings of Pantai Tungku. There are also some small, man-made islands made of rocks and sand with some trees planted on them.

== Demographics ==
As of 2016 census, the population of Mukim Gadong 'A' comprised 16,859 males and 17,190 females. The mukim had 5,395 households occupying 5,338 dwellings. The entire population lived in urban areas.

== Administration ==
Settlements	Population (2021)	Ketua kampung (2024)
Kampong Rimba Area 1	5,284	Puspawira bin Haji Md Noor
Kampong Rimba Area 2	5,284	Abdul Manap bin Haji Amit
STKRJ Kampong Rimba Area 1	4,506	Wahab bin Timbang @ Rosli
STKRJ Kampong Rimba Area 2	4,506	Ismail bin Haji Sulaihi
RPN Kampong Rimba Area 1	1,594	Haji Adanan bin Taha @ Awang Mohamad
RPN Kampong Rimba Area 2	4,151	Haji Mohammad bin Haji Kabon
RPN Kampong Rimba Area 3	2,861	Pengiran Haji Hashim bin Pengiran Ismail
RPN Kampong Rimba Area 4	2,294	Haji Julkepli bin Haji Ibrahim
RPN Kampong Rimba Area 5	4,877	Mohd Salleh bin Haji Ahmad
Kampong Katok	2,427	Haji Ismail bin Haji Rejab
Kampong Tungku	2,320	Haji Ismail bin Haji Rejab
STKRJ Tungku Area 1	1,027	Haji Hassan bin Haji Ali
STKRJ Tungku Area 2	1,958	Pengiran Mahmod Fakhrul Razi bin Pengiran Hamzah
STKRJ Tungku Area 3	2,125	Haji Adnan bin Haji Bagol

== Other locations ==
Other locations within the mukim include:

- Tungku Beach

== See also ==
- Public housing in Brunei
