= Kampong Rimba =

Village in Brunei

Kampong Rimba Kampung Rimba
- Village
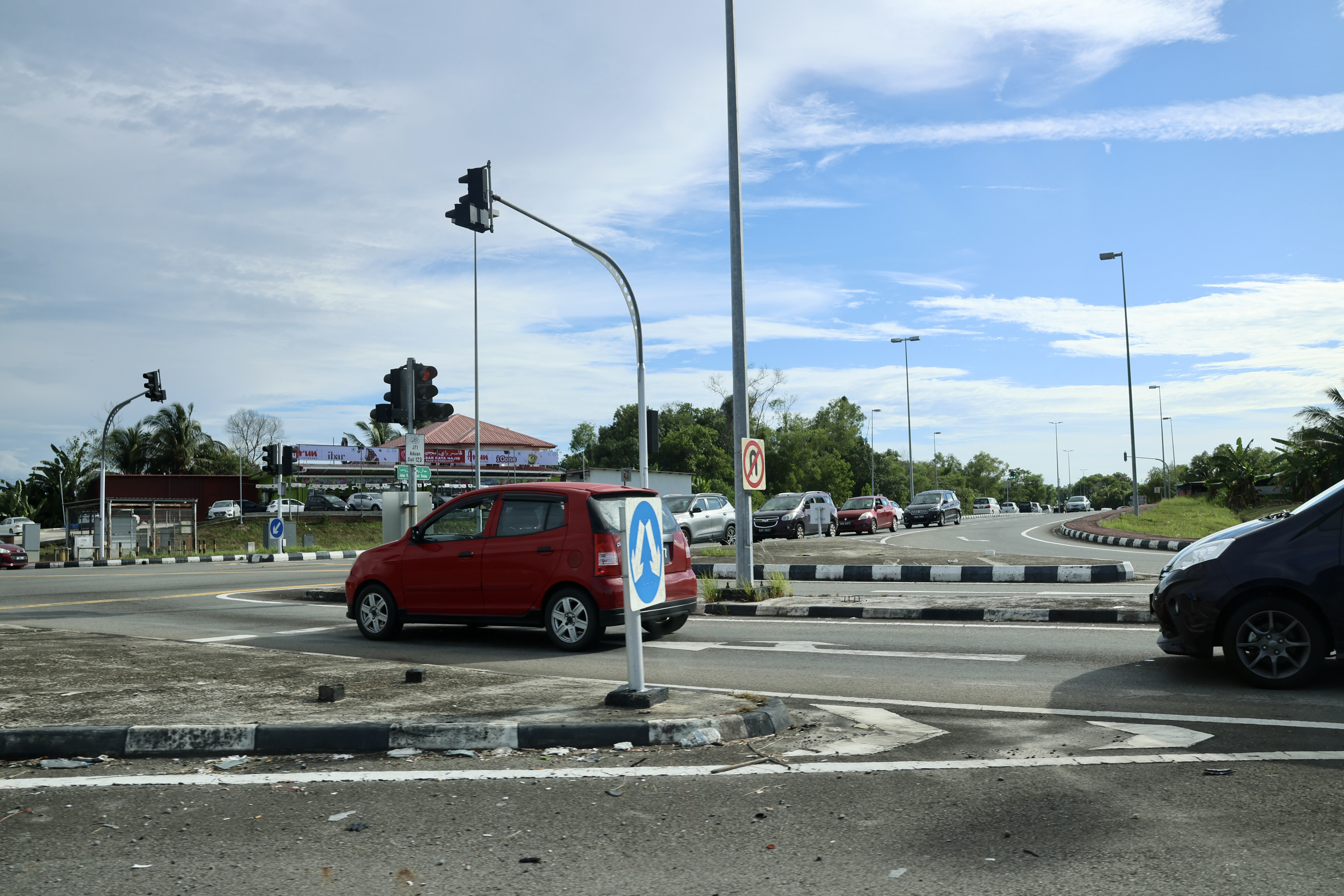

- Location in Brunei
- Coordinates: 4°55′38″N 114°54′21″E
- Country: Brunei
- District: Brunei-Muara
- Mukim: Gadong 'A'

Government
  - Village head: Puspawira Noor (Area 1); Abdul Manap Amit (Area 2)

Area
  - Total: 583.14 ha (1,441.0 acres)

Population (2016)
  - Total: 5,013
  - Density: 859.7/km^{2} (2,226/sq mi)
- Time zone: UTC+8 (BNT)
- Postcode: BE3119

Kampong Rimba (from the Malay name, literally translates as 'Rimba Village') is a village on the outskirts of Bandar Seri Begawan, the capital of Brunei. It is one of the village subdivisions under Mukim Gadong 'A', a mukim in Brunei-Muara District. The population was 5,013 in 2016.

== Etymology ==
The origin of the name Rimba is from the word rimba (thick forest). It is believed from the stories of the elders from word of mouth, at that time the residents made a living by exploring the jungle for farming and then made it the starting point of life from the Baloi River and moved to the countryside until it reached the Tungku Beach and continued to the current village site.

It is also believed that the message of Islam came to Rimba from the Arab missionaries who often traded through the South China Sea and indirectly conveyed the teachings of Islam. In the past, an Arab missionary who sailed through the South China Sea was hit by a storm and shipwrecked in Kuala Sungai Pulau Punyit. While waiting for the help of another ship, he taught the teachings of Islam and married the son of the leader of the Kedayan tribe at that time.

== Demography ==
A total percentage of the population consisting of Malays 96 percent equal to 6,002 people followed by Chinese 2.40 percent (150 people) and Indians 1.60 percent (100 people). According to the Ketua Kampong Rimba, there are 690 buildings in this village, while the total number of families living in this village is 893 families with a total population of 6,266 people consisting of 3,817 aged under 18 years and 18-59 years as many as 2,306 and 143 those over 60 years old.

== Infrastructure ==
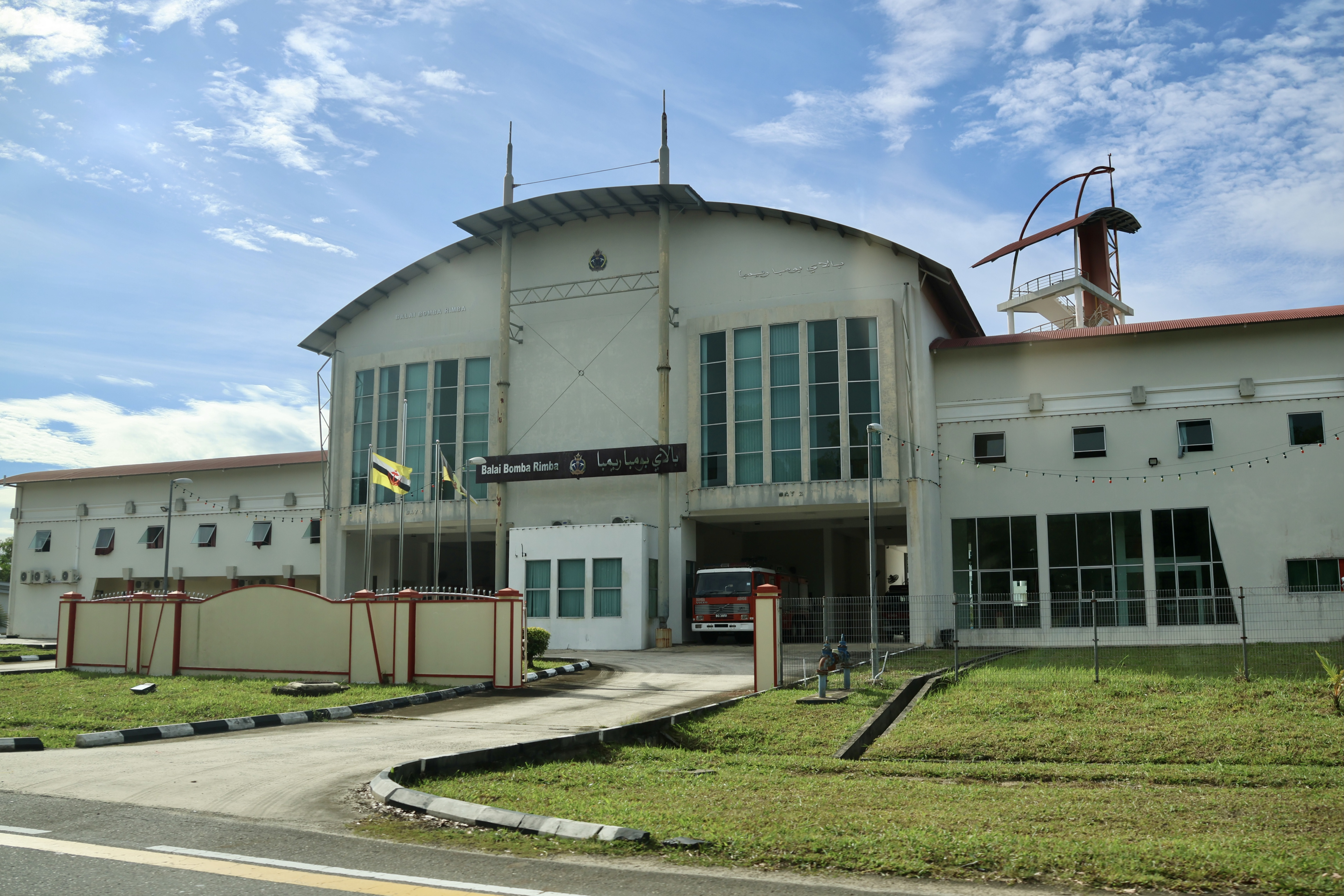
Rimba Fire Station

Kampong Rimba Housing is divided into five sections, namely RPN Kampong Rimba, STKRJ Kampong Rimba, Kampong Sungai Kedayan Resettlement Scheme Housing, Old Pemancha, Ujong Tanjong, Expo 2000 Scheme Housing, Housing Government Flats, Private Flat Housing (Rent), Business Block Buildings and Shop Houses. As in other villages, Kampong Rimba also has a Health Clinic, Kidney Clinic, Public Service Institute, Horticulture Trading Center, Royal Brunei Reserve Soldiers and Royal Brunei Military Police. In addition, Kampong Rimba also has a number of facilities including mosques, roads, public buses, water and electricity supply, grocery stores, mini supermarkets, eateries, cyber cafes and hardware stores. The village is also home to the Embassy of Myanmar.

=== Healthcare ===
The village is home to the following healthcare facilities:

- Pengiran Anak Puteri Hajah Muta-Wakkilah Hayatul Bolkiah Health Centre, a community health centre for the residents of Mukim Gadong 'A' and Mukim Gadong 'B'
- Rimba Dialysis Centre, one of the few dedicated dialysis centres in the country

=== Mosque ===
For the Jumu'ah (the congregational Friday noon prayers), the Muslim residents are served by the Raja Isteri Pengiran Anak Hajah Saleha Mosque.

=== Recreation ===
Among the activities that he is involved with the villagers, it is clear that he is also cleaning and making tracks for the Bukit Laicupu Recreational Park to introduce to the public to have a leisure place with the family, jogging, making studies of different types of plants and insect life that will be done by school students later. With the construction of the recreation park, teenagers and young people can be spared from the social symptoms that are not beneficial, hanging out in business complexes.

=== Miscellaneous ===
- Horticulture Business Centre — one of the few dedicated flower markets in the country. It is managed by the Agriculture and Agrifood Department, a government department under the Ministry of Primary Resources and Tourism.
- Civil Service Institute (Institut Perkhidmatan Awam) — the training agency for government civil servants

In 2015, the Ministry of Communications suggested building a central bus terminal in Rimba to take the place of the Bandar Seri Begawan's current main district bus station. The planned new terminal is strategically situated within the housing scheme, next to the Rimba Point mall, food court, and department store complex. This is part of measures that include redesigned bus routes and a new ticketing system. It is believed that the new station would serve as the primary bus interchange in Brunei Muara area and will offer links to other important districts, the Bandar Seri Begawan central business area, other districts, and most likely interstate connections.

== Notable people ==
- Adi Said (born 1990), footballer for Kasuka FC
