= Tungku Beach =

Beach in Brunei-Muara, Brunei

- Pantai Tungku
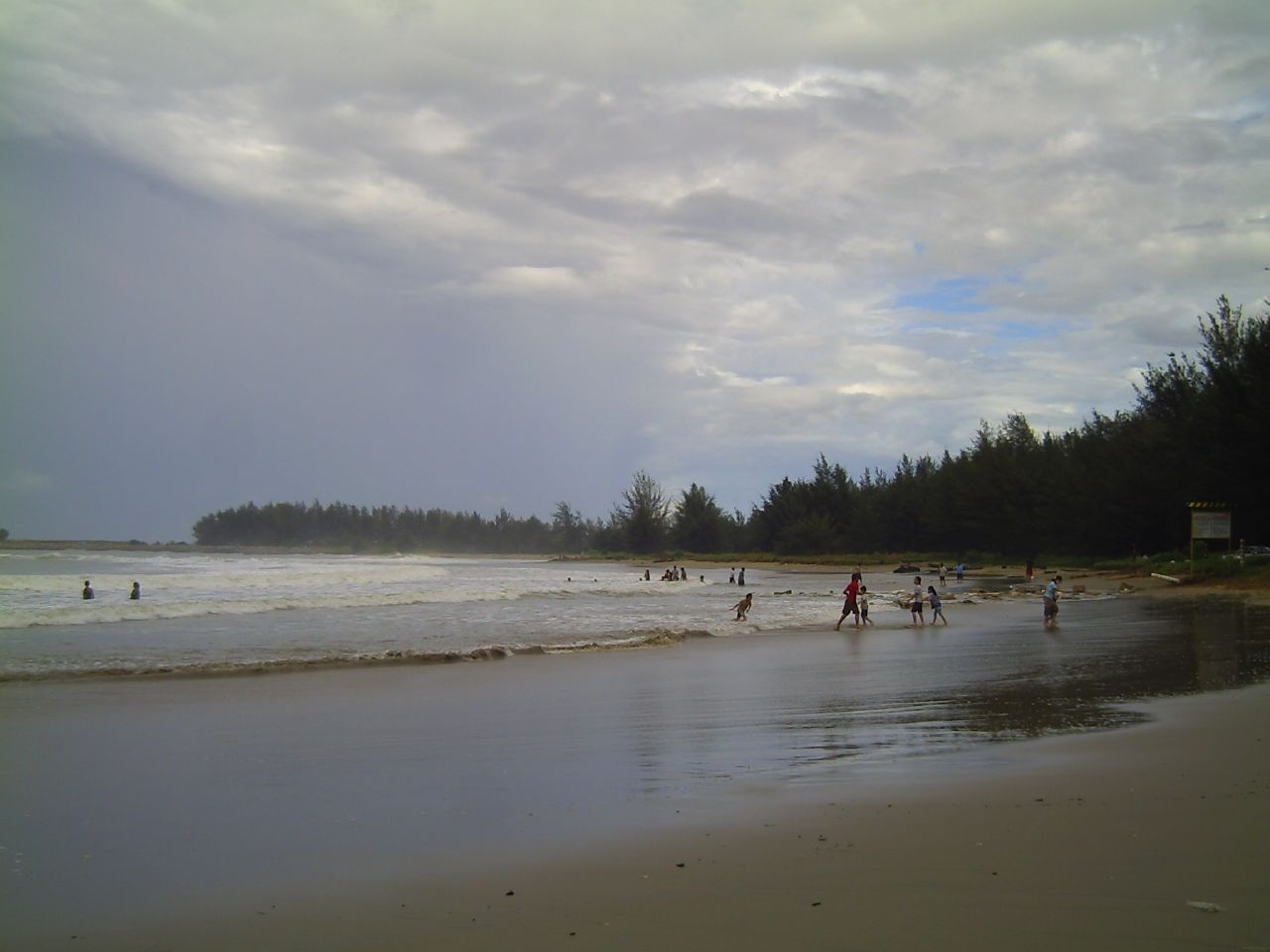

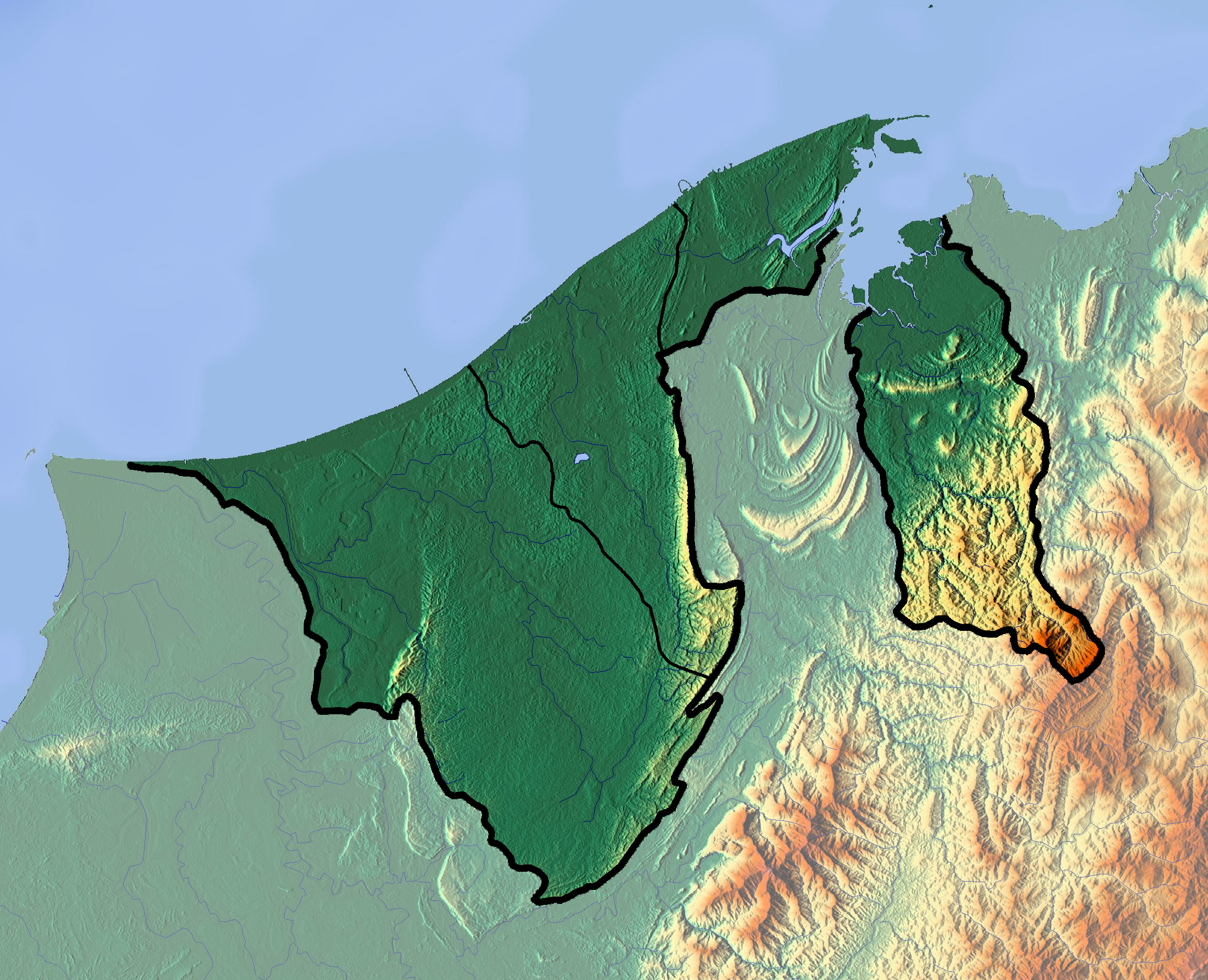
- Location within Brunei
- Location: Tungku, Gadong 'A', Brunei-Muara
- Nearest city: Bandar Seri Begawan, Brunei-Muara
- Coordinates: 4.9683817°N 114.8612669°E
- Governing body: Brunei Investment Agency

Tungku Beach (Malay: Pantai Tungku) is a Brunei Investment Agency (BIA) owned beach in Kampong Tungku, Gadong 'A', Brunei-Muara, Brunei. The beach is known for fishing, picnicking and view of sunsets over the South China Sea. The beach sits at an altitude of 76 metres (249 ft).

In 1992, it was reported that the beach had severe sand erosion. On 24 February 2013, a beach cleaning campaign was hosted by the Ministry of Development's Lands Department.
