= Daïra =

Country subdivision of a wilaya in Algeria and in Western Sahara

A daïra or daerah (Arabic: دائرة circle; plural dawaïr) is an administrative division in Algeria and Western Sahara in West Africa, as well as Brunei, Indonesia and Malaysia in Southeast Asia. It is commonly translated in English as "district".

== West Africa ==
"Daïra" is the primary spelling variant used in Algeria and Western Sahara. It is a subdivision of wilayah in both countries.

== Southeast Asia ==
"Daerah" is an Arabic loanword in Malay and Indonesian, which is cognate with "daïra".

=== Brunei ===
A daerah or district is the primary subdivision of Brunei. There are four daerah, namely Belait, Brunei-Muara, Temburong and Tutong. A daerah is subdivided into mukims (equivalent to subdistricts) and subsequently villages (kampung).

=== Indonesia ===
In Indonesia, "daerah" is used as in the term Daerah Istimewa/Khusus, which refers to the Special Regions or provinces with special status. There are three Special Regions (Aceh, the Special Region of Yogyakarta, and the Special Region of Jakarta), and there are six Special Autonomous Regions or Daerah Otonomi Khusus (Central Papua, Highland Papua, Papua, South Papua, Southwest Papua, and West Papua).

=== Malaysia ===
A daerah or district is a type of state administrative divisions in Malaysia. It is the primary subdivision of the states in Peninsular Malaysia, where as in Sabah and Sarawak in Malaysian Borneo, it is the secondary subdivision which is below divisions. Regardless, any daerah may be subdivided into mukims.

== See also ==
- District
- Arrondissement
