= Mukim Gadong 'B' =

- Mukim
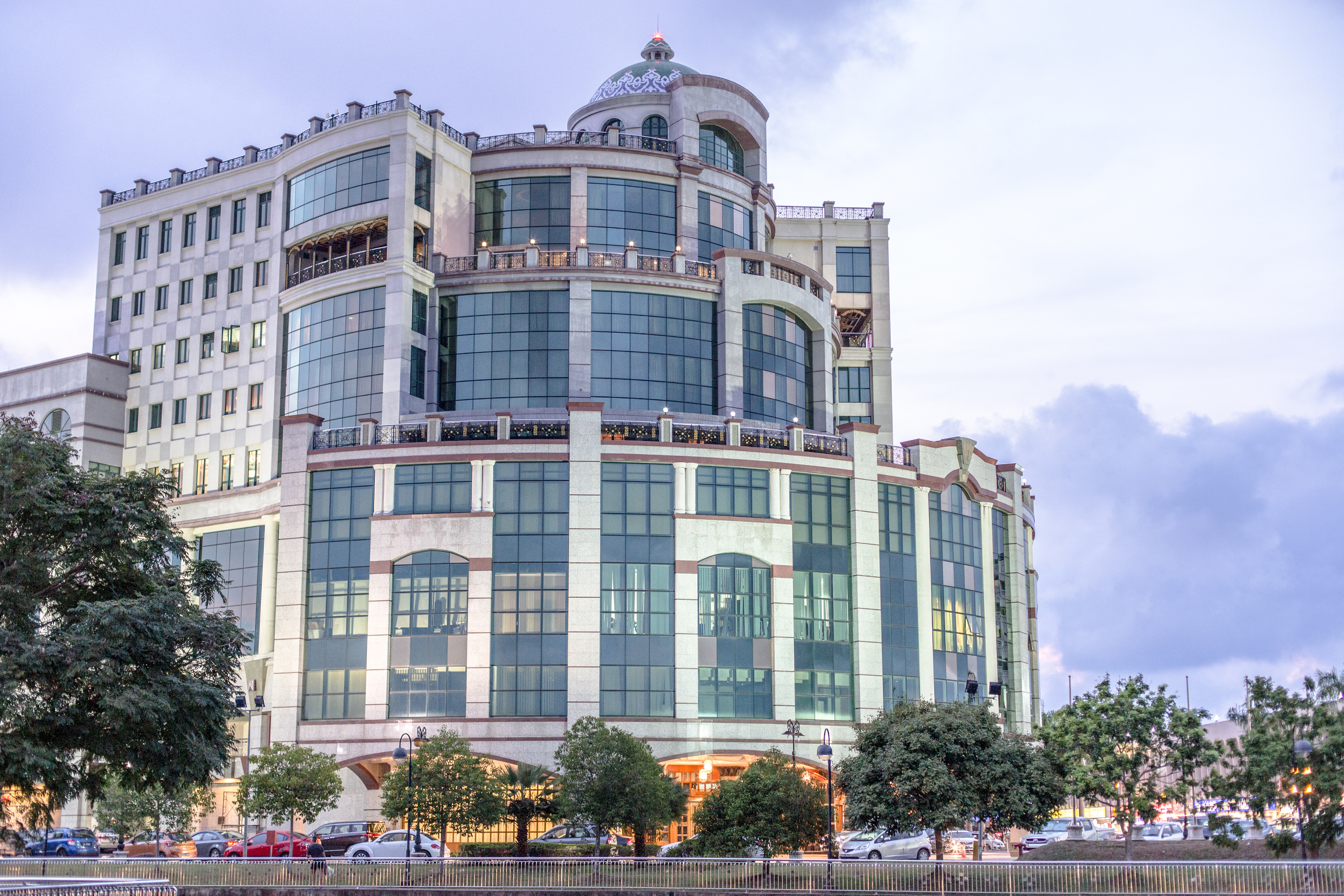
- The Rizqun International Hotel

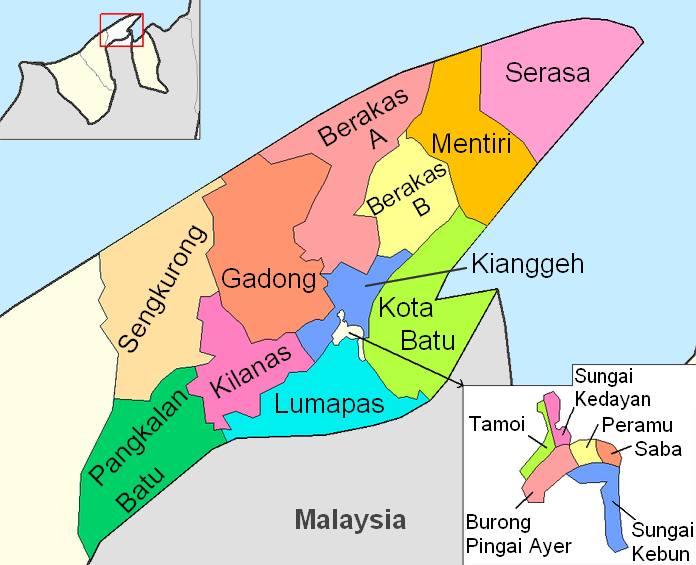
- Gadong is in peach.
- Coordinates: 4.5262°N 114.6193°E
- Country: Brunei
- District: Brunei-Muara
- Established: 21 November 2005

Government
  - Penghulu: Pengiran Muhammad Nurramzu Nazri

Area
  - Total: 2,456.4997 ha (6,070.143 acres)

Population (2021)
  - Total: 38,067
  - Density: 1,549.6/km^{2} (4,013.6/sq mi)
- Time zone: UTC+8 (BNT)
- Postcode: BExx18, BExx19

Mukim Gadong 'B' (Malay pronunciation: [muˈkim gaˈdoŋ]) is a mukim in Brunei-Muara District. Brunei. The population was 33,637 in 2016.

== Background ==
The mukim was established on 21 November 2005 with split of the former Mukim Gadong into this mukim and Mukim Gadong 'A'.

== Geography ==
The mukim is located in the central western part of the district, bordering Mukim Gadong 'A' to the north, Mukim Berakas 'A' to the north-east, Mukim Kianggeh to the east and south and Mukim Kilanas to the south and west.

== Demographics ==
As of 2016 census, the population of Mukim Gadong 'B' comprised 17,044 males and 16,593 females. The mukim had 6,710 households occupying 6,639 dwellings. The entire population lived in urban areas.

== Settlements ==
As of 2021, the mukim encompsses the following settlements:

Settlements	Population (2021)	Ketua kampung (2024)
Kampong Pengkalan Gadong	3,356	Haji Othaman bin Haji Patra (Acting)
Kampong Menglait	3,311	Haji Othaman bin Haji Patra
Kampong Mata-Mata	7,159	—N/a
Kampong Beribi Area 1	6,490	Haji Ali bin Haji Matassan
Kampong Beribi Area 2	6,490	Mohammad Faizal bin Haji Zaini
Kampong Beribi Area 3	6,490	Haji Ali bin Haji Matassan (Acting)
Kampong Kiarong Area 1	4,735	Mohammad Shair bin Haji Samsudin
Kampong Kiarong Area 2	4,735	Mohammad Shair bin Haji Samsudin (Acting)
Kampong Kiulap	3,663	Haji Hassan bin Haji Mohammad
Kampong Perpindahan Mata-Mata	2,189	Pengiran Muhammad Nurramzu Nazri bin Pengiran Haji Mohd Salleh
STKRJ Mata-Mata Area 1	2,484	Kapten (B) Pengiran Muhammad Redzuan bin Pengiran Haji Said
STKRJ Mata-Mata Area 2	2,195	Kapten (B) Pengiran Muhammad Redzuan bin Pengiran Haji Said
STKRJ Mata-Mata Area 3	2,485	Kapten (B) Pengiran Muhammad Redzuan bin Pengiran Haji Said

Gadong commercial area is located within Bandar Seri Begawan.
