= STKRJ Kampong Katok 'A' =

Public housing estate in Brunei

STKRJ Kampong Katok 'A' STKRJ Kampong Tungku Area 3
- Public housing estate and village
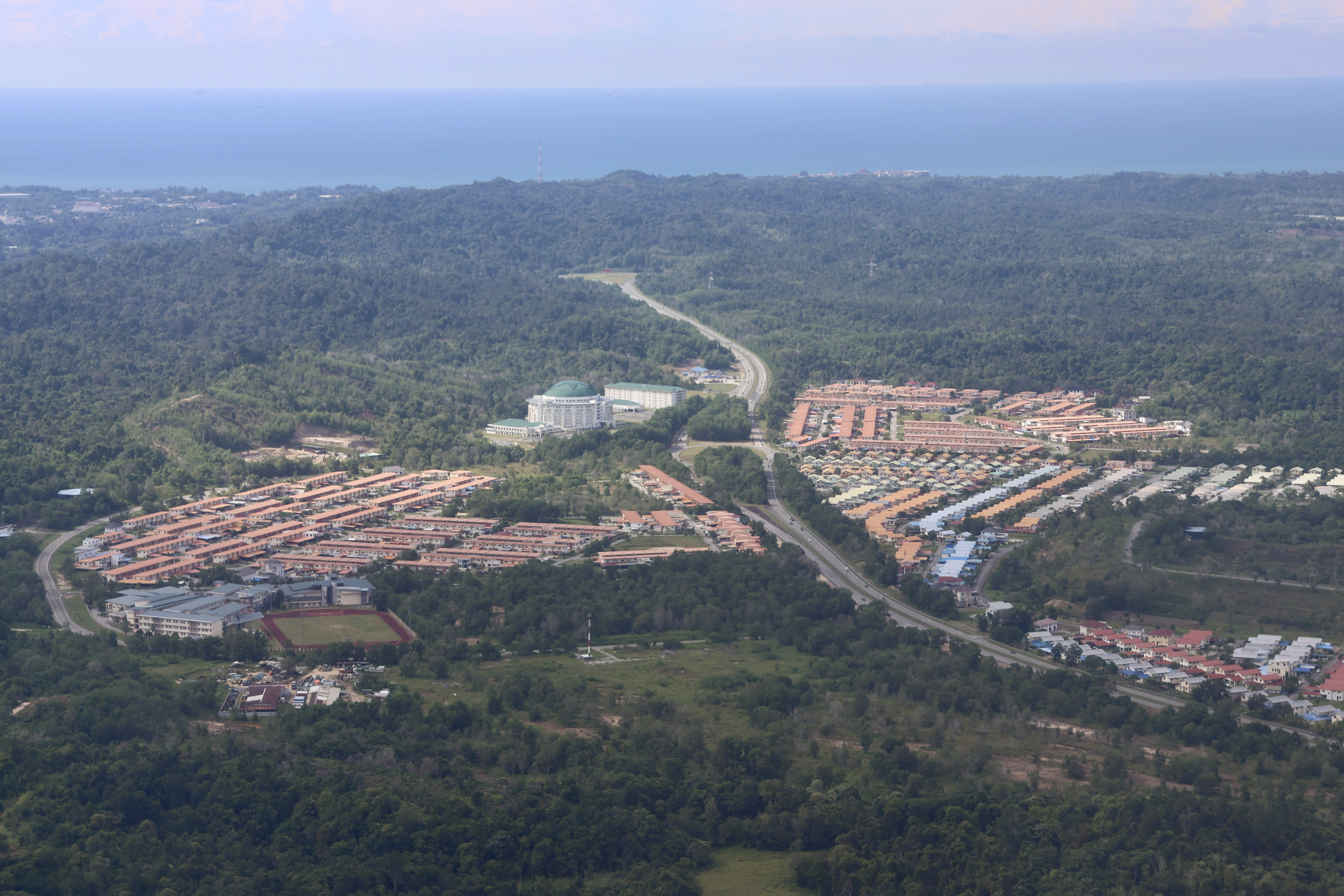

- Location in Brunei
- Coordinates: 4°55′30″N 114°52′50″E
- Country: Brunei
- District: Brunei-Muara
- Mukim: Gadong 'A'

Area
  - Total: 69.15 ha (170.9 acres)

Population (2016)
  - Total: 1,393
  - Density: 2,014/km^{2} (5,217/sq mi)
- Time zone: UTC+8 (BNT)
- Postcode: BE2919

STKRJ Kampong Katok 'A', also known as STKRJ Kampong Tungku Area 3, is a public housing estate and designated village in Brunei-Muara District, Brunei. It is located about 10 kilometres (6.2 mi) from the capital Bandar Seri Begawan. It has an area of 69.15 hectares (170.9 acres); the population was 1,393 in 2016. It is one of the villages within Mukim Gadong 'A'. The postcode is BE2919.

== Geography ==
The village is located on the outskirts of Bandar Seri Begawan municipal area, and about 10 kilometres (6.2 mi) from its city centre. With an area of 69.15 hectares (152.13 acres), this area has a population of 1,894 as of August 2015. The area overseen by him is starting from Simpang 355-21 type 'E' houses, which is 706 people, Simpang 355- 86 type 'D' houses, which is 534 people, while Simpang 355-101 house type 'C' recorded 492 people with a total of 1,732 people according to the 2014 census. Of that number, residents aged 18 and over are 1,409 people and residents under 18 years old are 485 people.

== Facilities ==
Katok 'A' Primary School is the government primary school. It also shares grounds with Katok 'A' Religious School, the government school for the country's Islamic religious primary education.

== See also ==
- Kampong Katok 'B'
- STKRJ Tungku Area 1
- STKRJ Tungku Area 2
