= STKRJ Kampong Rimba =

Public housing estate in Brunei

STKRJ Rimba
- Public housing estate and village
- STKRJ Kampong Rimba
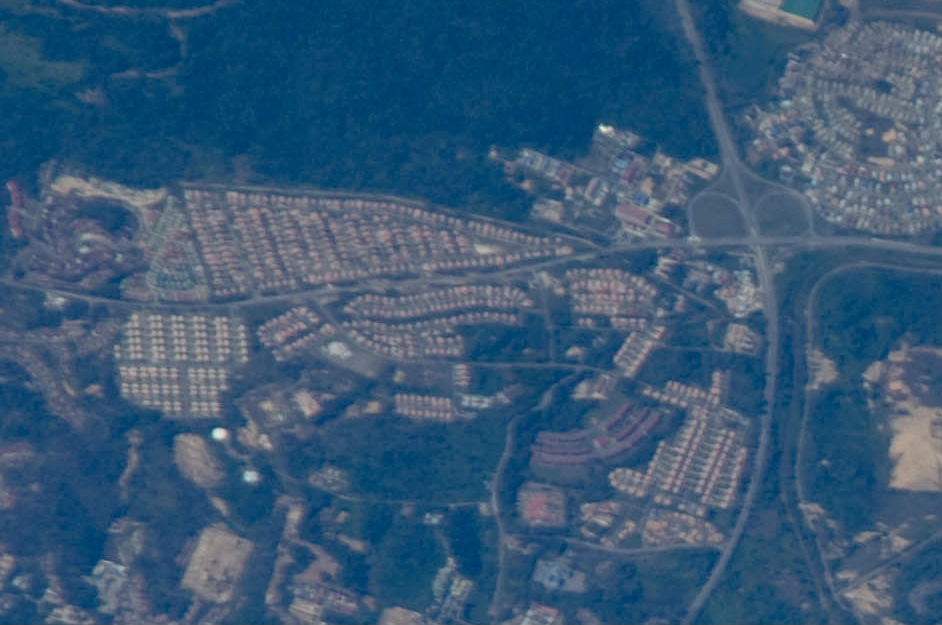

- Location in Brunei
- Coordinates: 4°56′12″N 114°53′59″E
- Country: Brunei
- District: Brunei-Muara
- Mukim: Gadong 'A'

Government
  - Village head: Wahab Timbang (Area 1); Ismail Sulaihi (Area 2)

Area
  - Total: 69.15 ha (170.9 acres)

Population (2016)
  - Total: 5,023
  - Density: 7,264/km^{2} (18,810/sq mi)
- Time zone: UTC+8 (BNT)
- Postcode: BE3119

Skim Tanah Kurnia Rakyat Jati (STKRJ) Kampong Rimba or STKRJ Rimba is a public housing area on the northern outskirts of Bandar Seri Begawan, the capital of Brunei. It is officially a village subdivision under Mukim Gadong 'A', a mukim in Brunei-Muara District. It has an area of 69.15 hectares (170.9 acres); the population was 5,023 in 2016.

== Demography ==
The housing area has a population of 6,800 people. There are 560 houses under the scheme, consisting of 61 Class B houses, 154 Class C houses, 97 Class D houses, 50 Class E houses, 87 houses in Expo 99 and 111 houses in Semi-detached houses.

== Infrastructure ==
This village has access to basic facilities such as electricity supply, roads, water supply and telephone booths. The public facilities that were established are the Public Service Institute, the Pengiran Anak Puteri Hajah Muta-Wakkilah Hayatul Bolkiah Health Center, the ABDB Military Camp and the Military Police Camp (storage) and the Holticultur Business Center. In the religious field, the Muslim villagers carry out religious events such as the Maulidur Rasul procession, the Majlis Korban in conjunction with Hari Raya Aidiladha and the Tahlil and Doa Sekampung Arwah Ceremony held in the month of Ramadan and so on.

== See also ==
- Public housing in Brunei
- RPN Kampong Rimba
