= Kampong Mata-Mata =

Village in Brunei-Muara, Brunei

Kampong Mata-Mata Kampung Mata-Mata
- Village and neighbourhood
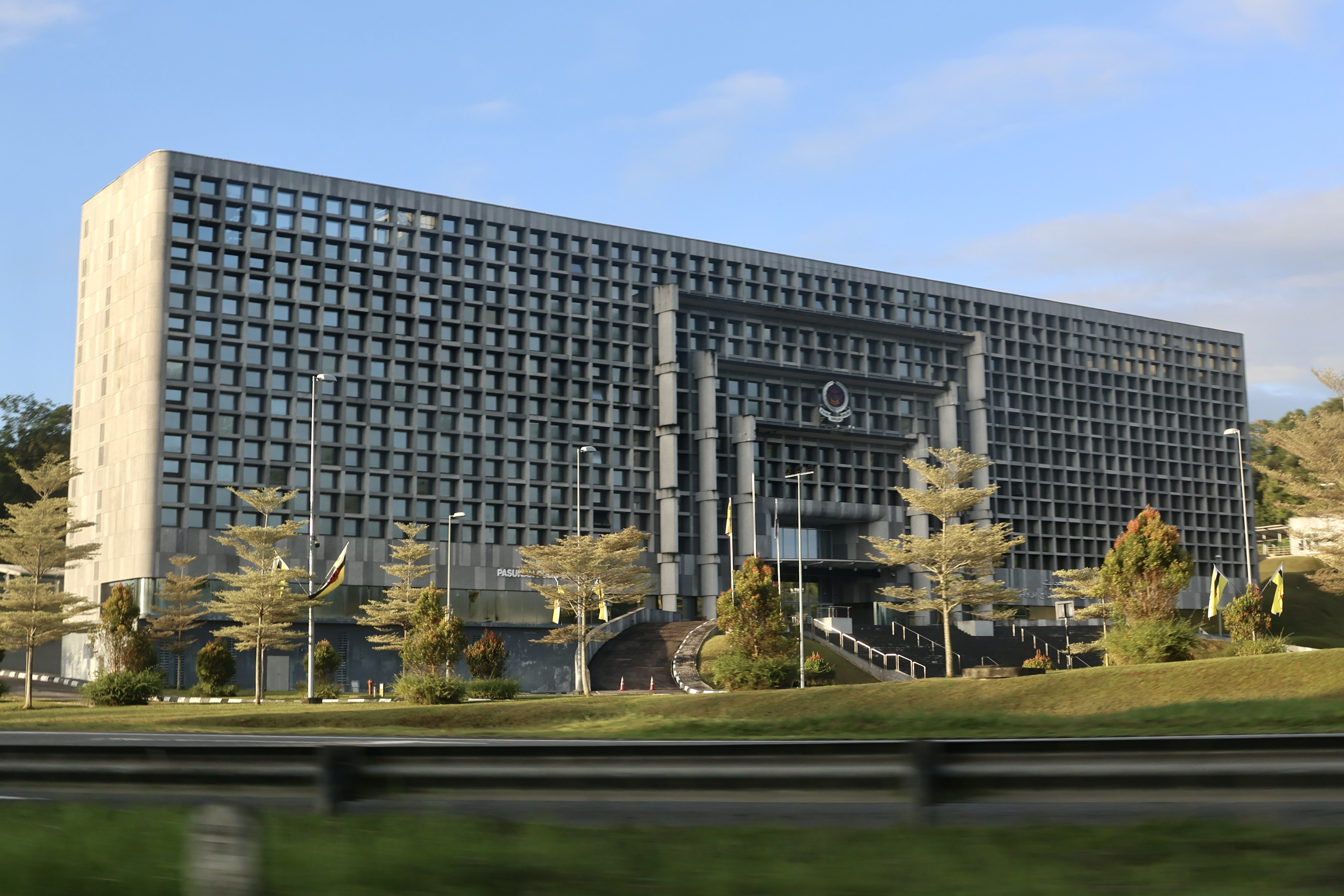
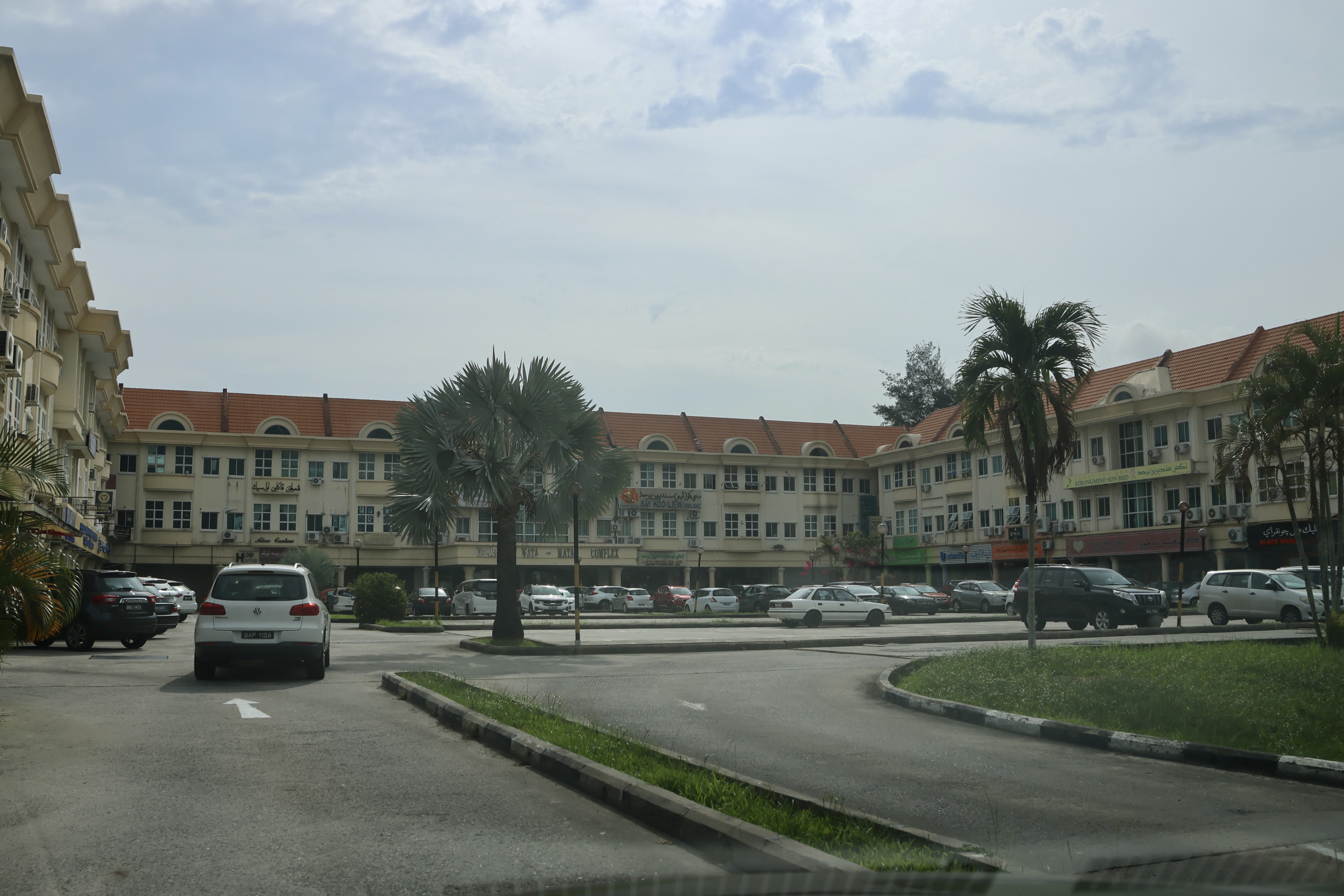
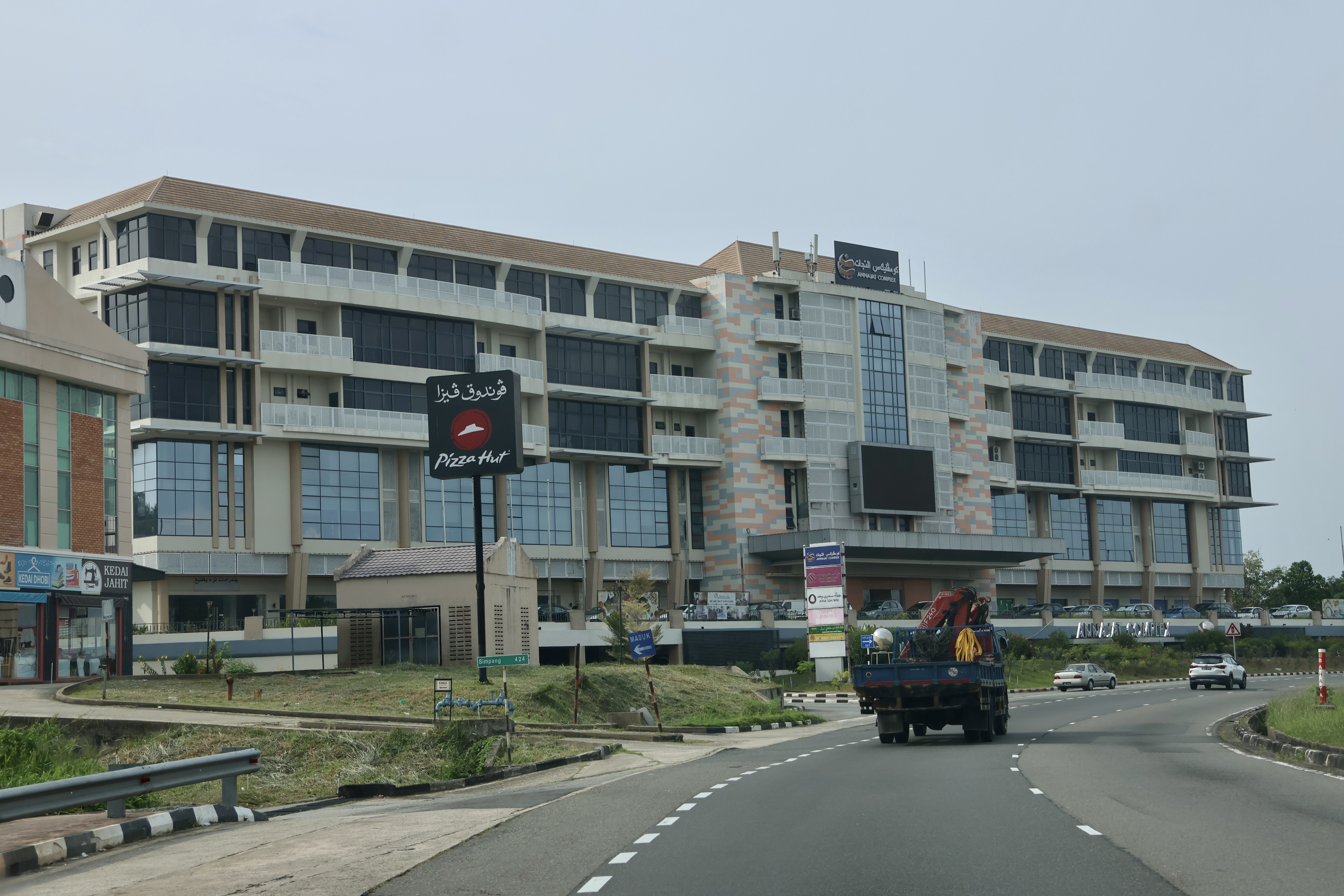
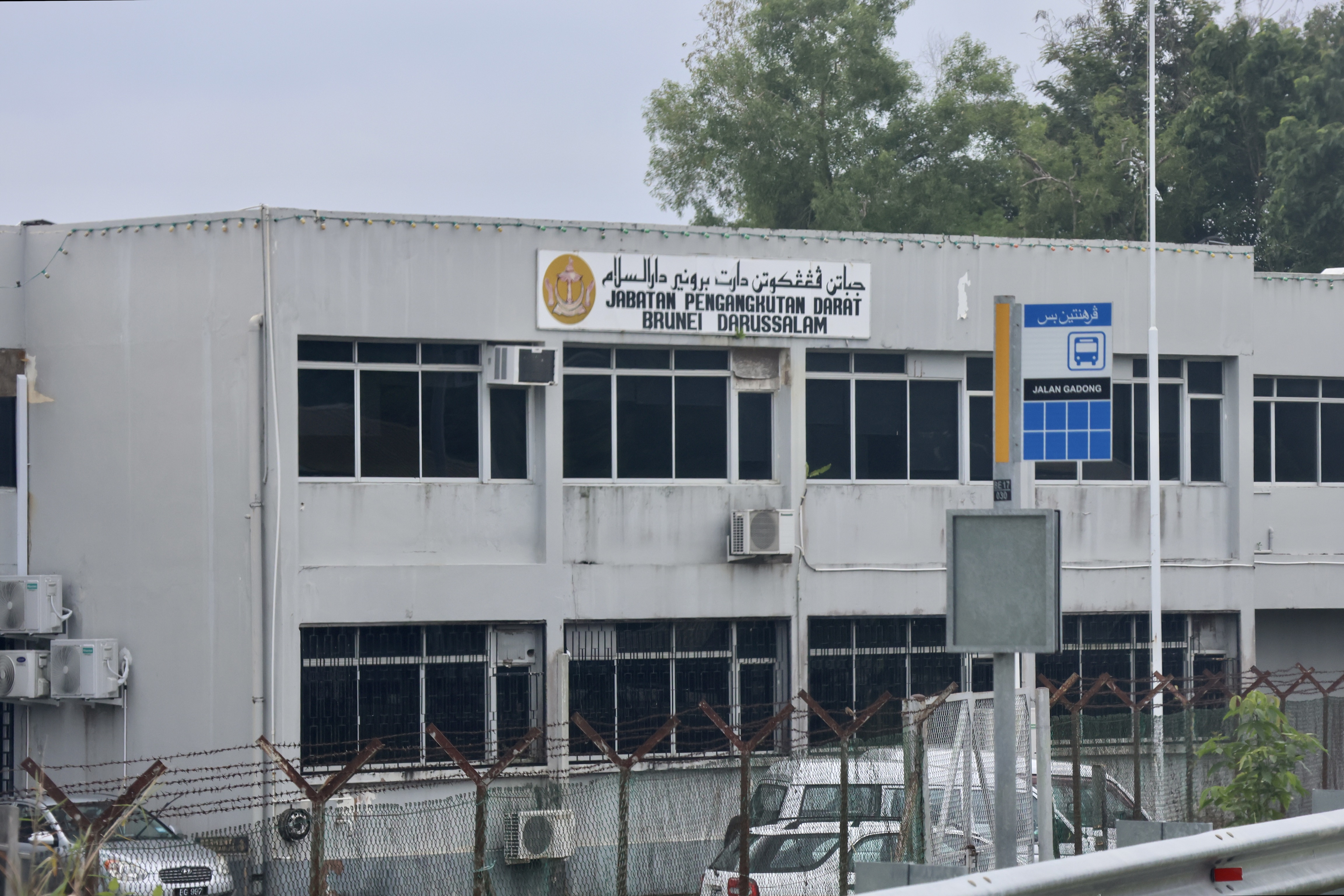
- Clockwise from top left: RBPF Headquarters, Warisan Mata-Mata Complex, former Land Transport Department building, Annajat Complex

- Location in Brunei
- Coordinates: 4°54′06″N 114°53′45″E
- Country: Brunei
- District: Brunei–Muara
- Mukim: Gadong 'B'
- Established: 1800s

Area
  - Total: 481.2059 ha (1,189.086 acres)

Population (2016)
  - Total: 6,126
  - Density: 1,273/km^{2} (3,297/sq mi)
- Time zone: UTC+8 (BNT)
- Postcode: BE1718

Kampong Mata-Mata (Malay: Kampung Mata-Mata) or commonly known as Mata-Mata, is a village in Brunei-Muara District, Brunei, and a neighbourhood in the capital Bandar Seri Begawan. The population was 6,126 in 2016. It is one of the villages within Mukim Gadong 'B'. The postcode is BE1718.

== Etymology ==
The origin of the name of the village which is said to be according to folktales, some village elders often came across a large eye of a size of a chicken which braced at a height of 7–8 feet in a tree or on the ground and from that incident the name Mata-Mata was given to the area in question which coincidentally at that time the village did not yet have a name around 1880. The people were born in the early 1800s and the story about the eyes is already there. Those eyes are not of the genie type and only certain people are shown to see those eyes. The story of the eye is believed because it is not just one or two but many people who saw it. It can be seen for a period of two to three years until after that they are no longer visible and disappeared.

== History ==
This history begins in the early 1800s when the village was first inhabited. In the early 1920s, the area was still a forest and not yet owned by anyone. There was not even permission for anyone could use the land until 1952. It is believed that in this area, some villagers have seen an eye that is stuck in a tree. At that time, the people's job was to grow rice when it was in season and to garden. They grow tugal rice (hill rice) by moving from one place to another. The forest area is seen first before it was divided. The land is divided into fields as much as two to three acres for one family after seeing in advance the condition of the land that will be explored for paddy and gardening. They move around because they want a comfortable place and also want (good) fertile land to grow rice and garden. The rice is stored in a place called 'durung'.

== Geography ==
Mata-Mata is located in the central part of Brunei-Muara District. It is also located on the outskirts of Bandar Seri Begawan, thus functions as a suburb of the capital. It neighbours the settlements of Katok to the north and Beribi to the south-east.

Mata-Mata consists of three main clusters of settlements, namely: Mata-Mata (original settlement), Perpindahan Mata-Mata and Mata-Mata Landless Indigenous Citizens' Housing Scheme. Perpindahan Mata-Mata (literally 'Mata-Mata Relocation') is a housing area established for a group of village residents in Kampong Ayer who had been relocated to live on land. Mata-Mata Landless Indigenous Citizens' Housing Scheme is also known as Katok 'B' Landless Indigenous Citizens' Housing Scheme even though the settlement is not contiguous to the original Katok settlement area.

== Administration ==
Apart from being a village subvidision, Kampong Mata-Mata has also been subsumed under the municipal area of the capital Bandar Seri Begawan.

== Demography ==
The area of the village is 48,121 hectares with a total of 1,392 houses built with a total population of 6,699 people consisting of 3,387 males and 3,312 females including 254 seniors. That number includes about 20 percent of the Chinese community. The community is special because, when Ramadan nears, the residents hold a village sangkai every Friday night at the worship center. This custom has been passed down from generation to generation. With the village's Requiem Prayer Council, which incorporates all the people in encouraging cooperative effort including other yearly events like the Hari Raya Aidilfitri Celebration.

== Economy ==
The traditional foods sold such as kalupis, penyaram, wajid, ulat-ulat (a type of thick porridge like cendul but white in color), surabai and celapam (included in sumboi-sumboi) were well received.

== Infrastructure ==
=== Education ===
The levels of education available in Mata-Mata only include primary and secondary. There are a few public primary schools as well as Katok Secondary School which are run by the government's education ministry. The Ugama or Islamic religious primary education, which has been made compulsory for Muslim pupils in Brunei, is also available in Mata-Mata. They are provided in a few religious schools which share grounds with the primary schools in Mata-Mata and they are run by the Ministry of Religious Affairs.

- Mata-Mata Primary School began operation in December 1979. According to records in 2018, there were 288 students with 29 permanent teachers. In the afternoon the school is used for student learning for the religious school session.
- Seri Mulia Sarjana School, private school
- Within Mata-Mata is also located Raja Isteri Pengiran Anak Hajah Saleha Girls' Secondary Arabic Religious School (Malay: Sekolah Ugama Arab Menengah Perempuan Raja Isteri Pengiran Anak Hajah Saleha), a government secondary school. However, it is a specialised school providing Islamic religious education and taught in Arabic; it is also run by the religious affairs ministry.

=== Mosque ===
There are two mosques in Mata-Mata, namely Kampong Perpindahan Mata-Mata Mosque and the Balai Ibadat of Kampong Mata-Mata. They primarily serve the Muslim residents for the Jumu'ah or weekly Friday prayers.

== Notable people ==
- Chan Key Hong, chairman of Maju Motors
- Nawawi Taha, private and confidential secretary to the sultan
