= Kampong Peninjau =

Peninjau
- Village
- Kampong Peninjau
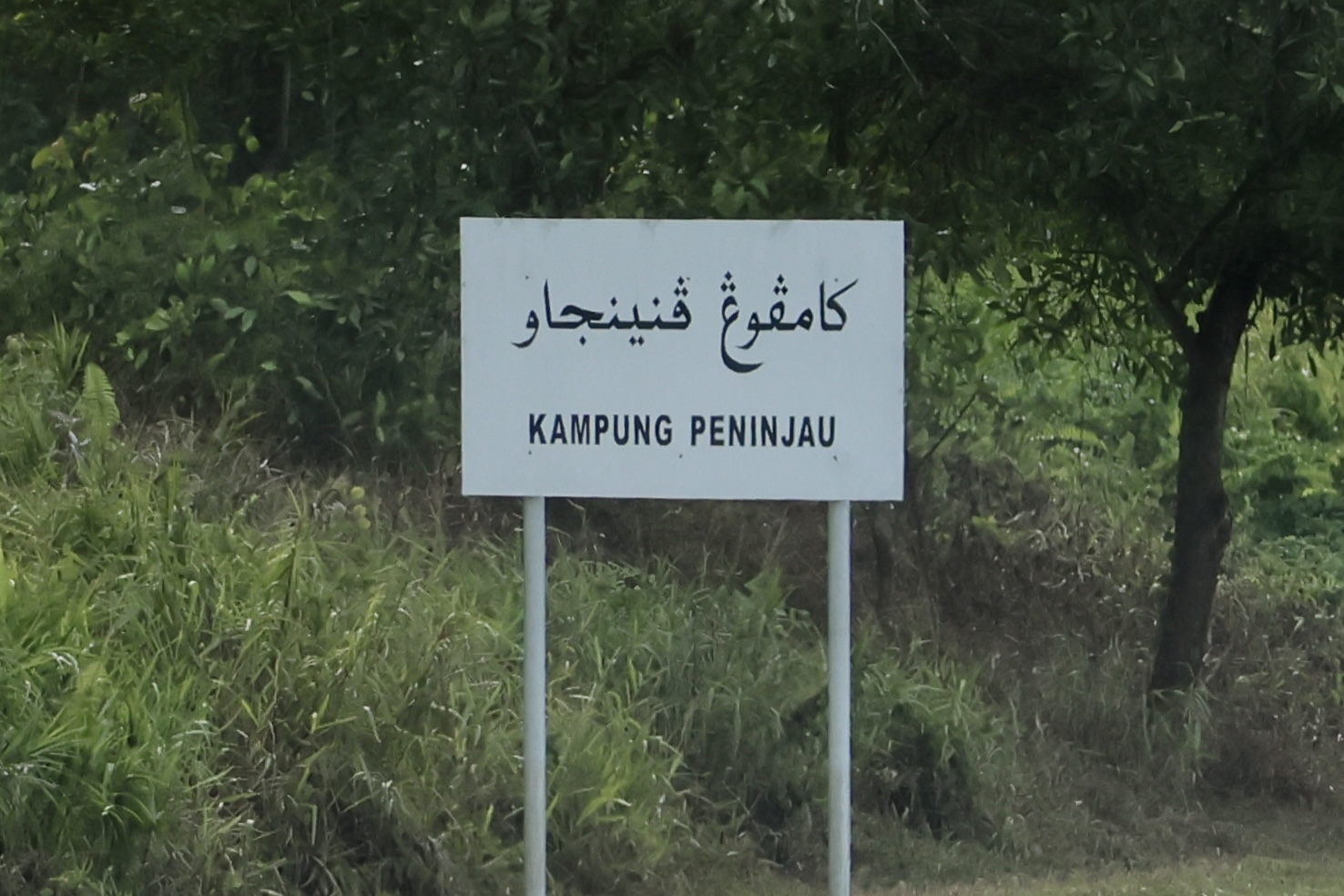
- Kampong Peninjau sign

- Location in Brunei
- Coordinates: 4°55′32″N 114°50′38″E
- Country: Brunei
- District: Brunei-Muara
- Mukim: Sengkurong

Government
  - Village head: Kamis Panjang

Population (2016)
  - Total: 3,418
- Time zone: UTC+8 (BNT)
- Postcode: BG3522

Kampong Peninjau, also known as Kampong Jerudong 'B', is a village in Brunei-Muara District, Brunei. The population was 3,418 in 2016. It is one of the villages within Mukim Sengkurong. The postcode is BG3522.
