= Administrative divisions of Brunei =

The administrative divisions of Brunei Darussalam mainly consist of daerah (districts), mukim (sub-districts), and kampung or kampong (villages). They are organised hierarchically in Brunei Darussalam, with daerah being the largest first level, and kampong the smallest third level.

There are also a few municipal (or city) divisions: Bandar Seri Begawan, and a few district towns. They are considered to be outside the conventional hierarchy of the main administrative division.

All the administrative divisions are under direct governance of the government, through the Ministry of Home Affairs. Generally, the administrative divisions serve for population census. The administrative areas have limited to no autonomy, and is more pronounced towards the lowest administrative level. The major socio-political aspects, such as education and law are centralised and managed through separate government ministries or departments.

== Districts ==
There are four districts in Brunei Darussalam (daerah), namely: Brunei-Muara, Belait, Tutong, and Temburong. Brunei-Muara is the smallest district by area, but has the largest population. Belait is the largest district by area, and the centre for the production of oil and gas.

A district is headed by a Pegawai Daerah or District Officer, and assisted by an Assistant District Officer.

== Mukims ==
The administrative level of mukim in Brunei Darussalam lies below (subordinate) the district. At present, there are thirty-eight mukims in Brunei; with seventeen in Brunei-Muara, eight in Tutong, eight in Belait, and five in Temburong. A mukim is headed by a penghulu.

== Villages ==
A village (Malay: kampung or kampong) is the smallest and lowest administrative level in Brunei Darussalam, and headed by a ketua kampong or village head. Its population varies from a few hundreds to units of thousands.

Kampong Ayer is not considered a kampong administrative division. It is simply a common term in referring to the whole of the cluster of settlements on the Brunei River. However, Kampong Ayer is a large area which consists of a few mukim and a number of kampong.

== Municipalities ==
There are four 'major' areas of population in Brunei Darussalam, which are considered to be bandaran or municipality, namely:

- Bandar Seri Begawan, the country's capital; also the capital of Brunei-Muara District;
- Kuala Belait, the administrative town for Belait District;
- Seria, a town in Belait District, and;
- Tutong, the administrative town for Tutong District.

The municipalities are considered outside the conventional hierarchy of the main administrative division, as their spatial jurisdiction do not necessarily fit to any of the levels, as well as their sizes are not consistent; Bandar Seri Begawan comprises several mukims, but other towns comprise only a few villages. Also, the municipalities are governed under different departments from that which administer the districts and their sub-divisions, although still within the same ministry.

The municipalities are headed by Pengerusi Lembaga Bandaran, or Town Board Chairman.

While Bangar is the focal town of Temburong, it is yet to have a municipal status. Although the official name for Bangar is Pekan Bangar (literally translates as 'Bangar Town'), it is a village sub-division. Similarly, Muara (Malay: Pekan Muara) is a port town in Brunei-Muara District, but it is also administered as a village under the mukim of Serasa.
