= Public housing in Brunei =

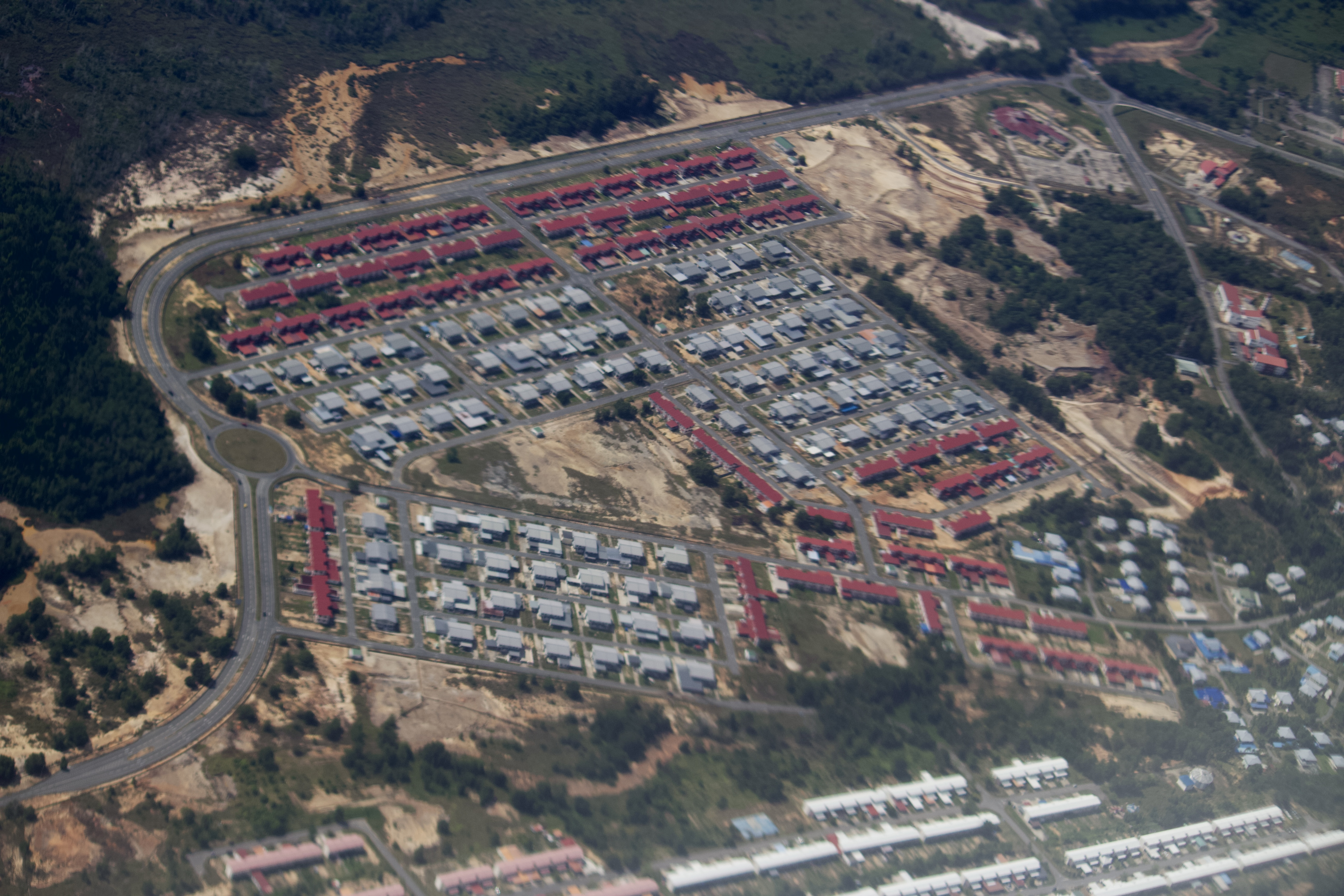
Aerial view of Bukit Beruang National Housing Scheme in 2022.

Public housing in Brunei comprises government development programmes which aim to provide ownership of land or homes to the citizens of Brunei. They are managed by the Housing Development Department (Malay: Jabatan Kemajuan Perumahan), a government department under the Ministry of Development. There has been three main public housing programmes in the country, namely the National Housing Scheme (Malay: Rancangan Perumahan Negara), the Landless Indigenous Citizens' Housing Scheme (Malay: Skim Tanah Kurnia Rakyat Jati) and the National Resettlement Scheme (Malay: Rancangan Perpindahan Negara).

== History ==
Public housing was first initiated in the 1950s by the government in the form of mass resettlement programmes for the residents of Kampong Ayer, the stilt settlement on the Brunei River. In that decade there were cholera and smallpox epidemics which greatly affected the residents; at that time more residents settled along the banks than the middle of the river and hence more prone to the diseases. Therefore, the initial aim of the housing programme was to relocate the residents to places on land which are less susceptible to the spread of the diseases.

However, the programme eventually shifted its aim to allow the Kampong Ayer residents in owning a home on land. The first resettlement programme was carried out in 1952 in which a housing estate was developed in Bunut. Followed by the completion of Burong Pingai Berakas and Pancha Delima housing estates in 1953. There were then succession of resettlement programmes in the following few decades, and subsequently various resettlement estates appeared which are all located in Brunei-Muara District.

In the 1970s, the government conducted analysis on the housing demands in the country and eventually came up with the present housing programmes. Lambak Kanan became the first area to be developed as the estate of Rancangan Perumahan Negara beginning in 1984. The National Housing Scheme has distributed more than 30,000 homes and land parcels since 1984. When building public housing, adopting cutting-edge technologies and environmental sustainability is crucial. Furthermore, investigating vertical housing options seeks to maximise the use of available land, meeting the growing need for public housing while promoting environmental concerns.

== Programmes ==
Although there has been three main housing development programmes conducted by the government, only two are currently pursued, namely the National Housing Scheme and the Landless Indigenous Citizens' Housing Scheme.

=== National Housing Scheme ===
The National Housing Scheme (Malay: Rancangan Perumahan Negara, commonly abbreviated as RPN) aims to provide homes to the citizens of Brunei regardless of ethnic or racial background. Houses are granted in turns according to the year of the application by the applicants.

=== Landless Indigenous Citizens' Housing Scheme ===
In contrast with the National Housing Scheme, the Landless Indigenous Citizens' Housing Scheme (Malay: Skim Tanah Kurnia Rakyat Jati, commonly abbreviated as STKRJ) aims to provide private lands, which often comes with completely-built homes, specifically to rakyat jati or the indigenous citizens of the country. The rakyat jati are essentially the indigenous Malays, which consist of the seven ethnic groups officially recognised by the government, namely the Brunei Malay, Kedayan, Bisaya, Tutong, Dusun, Belait and Murut.

=== National Resettlement Scheme ===
The National Resettlement Scheme (Malay: Rancangan Perpindahan Negara) has been a housing programme carried out by the government to aid the residents of Kampong Ayer in resettling on land. It is currently not active or that the relocation programme is handled as part of the other two housing programmes.

== Estates ==
The housing estates are developed in all four districts of Brunei, generally as part of existing villages or other survey areas, or in their vicinity. Each estate constitutes only one of either housing programmes. However, a village or area may have more than one type of estates. Some estates may also have enough population comparable that of village settlements and hence they are designated as village subdivisions, the third- and lowest-level administrative divisions of the country. A few estates even have larger population and end up having more than one village subdivisions.

Nevertheless, each village subdivision of a housing estate functions similar to the local village, including having a ketua kampung or village head as its community leader as well as a Village Consultative Council (Malay: Majlis Perundingan Kampung) as the community association. There may also be presence of community infrastructure such as a primary school and a community centre. As Brunei is predominantly Muslim, a mosque may also be built for the Muslim residents to perform Jumu'ah or Friday prayers, as well as a religious school which provides the Islamic religious primary education compulsory for Muslim pupils in the country.
