= List of villages in Brunei =

Brunei is divided into four districts (daerah), namely Brunei Muara, Belait, Tutong and Temburong. Each district is divided into several mukims. Altogether there are 39 mukims in Brunei. Each mukim encompasses several villages (kampung or kampong). The following is a list of villages in Brunei.

== Belait District ==
=== Melilas Mukim ===
- Kampong Tempinak
- Kampong Melilas
- Kampong Bengerang II

=== Seria Mukim ===
- Kampong Baru
- Kampong Perakong
- Kampong Ubi(Jabang)
- Kampong Lorong Tiga Selatan
- Kampong Panaga
- Kampong Anduki
- Kampong Sungai Bera
- Kampong Perpindahan Baru

In the Badas area:

- Kampong Badas

=== Sukang Mukim ===
- Kampong Apak-Apak
- Kampong Saud
- Kampong Buau
- Kampong Kukup
- Kampong Sukang
- Kampong Dungun
- Kampong Ambawang
- Kampong Biadong Tengah
- Kampong Biadong Ulu

=== Liang Mukim ===
- Andulau Forest Reserve
- Agis-Agis
- Keluyoh
- Lilas
- Lumut
- Lumut Camp
- Lumut National Housing Area 1
- Lumut National Housing Area 2
- Lumut Tersusun
- Perumpong
- Sungai Bakong
- Sungai Gana
- Sungai Kang
- Sungai Kuru
- Sungai Lalit
- Sungai Liang
- Sungai Tali
- Sungai Taring
- Skim Tanah Kurnia Rakyat Jati Lumut
- Tunggulian

=== Labi Mukim ===
- Kampong Bukit Puan
- Kampong Gatas
- Kampong Kenapol
- Kampong Labi
- Kampong Labi Lama
- Kampong Malayan
- Kampong Mendaram Besar
- Kampong Mendaram Kecil
- Kampong Pesilin
- Kampong Rampayoh
- Kampong Ratan
- Kampong Simpang Tiga
- Kampong Sungai Petai
- Kampong Tanajor
- Kampong Tapang Lupak
- Kampong Teraja
- Kampong Terawan
- Kampong Terunan

=== Kuala Belait Mukim ===
- Kampong Pekan Belait
- Kampong Melayu Asli
- Kampong Melayu Baru
- Kampong China
- Kampong Temenggong
- Kampong Lubok Palam
- Kampong Sungai
- Pekan Kuala Belait

=== Kuala Balai ===
- Kampong Kuala Balai
- Kampong Mala’as
- Kampong Sungai Damit
- Kampong Sungai Mendaram

== Brunei Muara District ==
=== Berakas A ===
- Anggerek Desa
- Burong Pingai Berakas
- Jaya Bakti
- Jaya Setia
- Lambak
- Lambak Kiri
- Lambak Kiri Landless Indigenous Citizens' Housing Scheme
- Orang Kaya Besar Imas
- Pancha Delima
- Pengiran Siraja Muda Delima Satu
- Pulaie
- Serusop

=== Berakas B ===
- Madang
- Manggis
- Salambigar
- Sungai Akar
- Sungai Hanching
- Sungai Orok
- Sungai Tilong

=== Burong Pingai Ayer Mukim ===
- Kampong Burong Pingai Ayer
- Kampong Lurong Dalam
- Kampong Pandai Besi 'A'
- Kampong Pandai Besi 'B'
- Kampong Sungai Pandan 'A'
- Kampong Sungai Pandan 'B
- Kampong Pg. Setia Negara
- Kampong Pekan Lama
- Kampong Sungai Asam

=== Gadong A Mukim ===
- Katok
- Rimba
- Rimba Landless Indigenous Citizens' Housing Scheme
- Rimba National Housing Scheme Area 1
- Rimba National Housing Scheme Area 2
- Rimba National Housing Scheme Area 3
- Rimba National Housing Scheme Area 4
- Rimba National Housing Scheme Area 5
- Tungku
- Tungku Landless Indigenous Citizens' Housing Scheme Area 1
- Tungku Landless Indigenous Citizens' Housing Scheme Area 2
- Tungku Landless Indigenous Citizens' Housing Scheme Area 3 (also known as Katok 'A')

=== Gadong B Mukim ===
- Beribi
- Kiarong
- Kiulap
- Mata-Mata
- Mata-Mata Landless Indigenous Citizens' Housing Scheme Area 1
- Mata-Mata Landless Indigenous Citizens' Housing Scheme Area 2
- Mata-Mata Landless Indigenous Citizens' Housing Scheme Area 3
- Menglait
- Pengkalan Gadong
- Perpindahan Mata-Mata

=== Kianggeh Mukim ===
- City Centre,
- Berangan,
- Kianggeh,
- Kumbang Pasang,
- Parit,
- Pusar Ulak,
- Tasek Lama,
- Tumasek
- Tungkadeh

=== Kilanas Mukim ===
- Bengkurong
- Bunut
- Bunut Perpindahan
- Burong Lepas
- Kilanas
- Jangsak
- Madewa
- Sinarubai
- Tanjong Bunut
- Tasek Meradun
- Telanai

=== Kota Batu Mukim ===
- Belimbing
- Dato Gandi
- Kota Batu
- Mengkubau
- Menunggol
- Pelambayan
- Pintu Malim
- Pudak
- Pulau Baru-Baru dan Berbunut
- Riong
- Serdang
- Subok
- Sungai Belukut
- Sungai Besar
- Sungai Bunga
- Sungai Lampai
- Sungai Matan
- Perpindahan Tanjong Cendana

=== Lumapas Mukim ===
- Kupang
- Putat
- Pengkalan Batang
- Kasat
- Buang Sakar
- Tarap Bau
- Bukit Merikan
- Lupak Luas
- Sungai Asam
- Buang Tekurok
- Sengkirap (formerly part of Buang Tekurok)
- Lumapas 'A'
- Lumapas 'B'
- Pancur
- Kilugus

=== Mentiri Mukim ===
- Tanah Jambu
- Sungai Buloh
- Batu Marang
- Panchor
- Mengkubau
- Mentiri

=== Pangkalan Batu Mukim ===
- Kampong Batang Perhentian
- Kampong Batong
- Kampong Batu Ampar
- Kampong Bebatik
- Kampong Bebuloh
- Kampong Bukit Belimbing
- Kampong Imang
- Kampong Junjongan
- Kampong Kuala Lurah
- Kampong Limau Manis
- Kampong Masin
- Kampong Panchor Murai
- Kampong Parit
- Kampong Pengkalan Batu
- Kampong Wasan

=== Peramu Mukim ===
- Bakut Berumput
- Bakut Siraja Muda 'A'
- Bakut Siraja Muda 'B'
- Lurong Sikuna
- Pekilong Muara
- Peramu
- Setia Pahlawan Lama
- Saba Mukim
- Saba Darat 'A'
- Saba Darat 'B'
- Saba Laut
- Saba Tengah
- Saba Ujong

=== Sengkurong Mukim ===
- Kampong Jerudong
- Kampong Katimahar
- Kampong Kulapis
- Kampong Lugu
- Kampong Mulaut
- Kampong Pasai
- Kampong Selayun
- Kampong Sengkurong
- Kampong Tagap
- Kampong Tanjong Nangka

=== Serasa Mukim ===
- Kapok,
- Meragang,
- Muara,
- Pelumpong,
- Sabun
- Serasa.

=== Sungai Kebun Mukim ===
- Kampong Bolkiah 'A'
- Kampong Bolkiah 'B'
- Kampong Setia 'A'
- Kampong Setia 'B'
- Kampong Sungai Siamas
- Kampong Ujong Kelinik
- Kampong Sungai Kebun

=== Sungai Kedayan ===
- Kampong Sumbiling Lama (Ayer)
- Kampong Bukit Salat
- Kampong Sungai Kedayan 'B'
- Kampong Sungai Kedayan 'A'
- Kampong Ujong Tanjong
- Kampong Kuala Peminyak
- Kampong Pemancha lama

=== Tamoi Mukim ===
- Pengiran Bendahara Lama
- Pengiran Kerma Indera Lama
- Pengiran Tajuddin Hitam
- Tamoi Tengah
- Tamoi Ujong

== Temburong District ==
=== Amo Mukim ===
- Amo 'A'
- Amo 'B'
- Amo 'C'
- Batang Duri
- Belaban
- Biang
- Parit
- Selangan
- Sibulu
- Sibut
- Sumbiling Lama
- Sumbiling Baru

=== Bangar Mukim ===
- Pekan Bangar Lama
- Pekan Bangar Baru
- Perkemahan Bangar
- Kampong Menengah
- Kampong Sungai Sulok
- Kampong Sungai Tanit
- Kampong Sungai Tanam
- Kampong Balayang
- Kampong Semamang
- Kampong Buang Bulan
- Kampong Belingus
- Kampong Batang Tuau
- Kampong Seri Tanjong Belayang
- Kampong Puni
- Kampong Ujong Jalan

=== Batu Apoi Mukim ===
- Kampong Batu Apoi
- Kampong Sungai Radang
- Kampong Peliunan
- Kampong Sungai Bantaian
- Kampong Gadong Baru
- Kampong Luagan
- Kampong Negalang Iring
- Kampong Negalang Unat
- Kampong Lakiun
- Kampong Tanjong Bungar
- Kampong Lamaling
- Kampong Selapon
- Kampong Sekurop

=== Bokok Mukim ===
- Kampong Buda-Buda
- Kampong Belais
- Kampong Belais Kecil
- Kampong Paya Bagangan
- Kampong Bokok
- Kampong Meniup
- Kampong Bakarut
- Kampong Simbatang
- Kampong Rataie
- Kampong Perpindahan Rataie
- Kampong Rakyat Jati
- Kampong Kenua
- Kampong Lepong Baru
- Kampong Lepong Lama
- Kampong Semabat Bahagia
- Kampong Semabat
- Kampong Temada

=== Labu Mukim ===
- Kampong Labu Estate
- Kampong Senukoh
- Kampong Piasau-Piasau
- Kampong Payau
- Kampong Ayam-Ayam

== Tutong District ==
=== Keriam Mukim ===
- Bukit Panggal
- Ikas
- Keriam
- Kupang
- Luagan Dudok
- Maraburong
- Sinaut
- Sungai Kelugos

=== Kiudang Mukim ===
- Kampong Bakiau
- Kampong Batang Mitus
- Kampong Birau
- Kampong Kebia
- Kampong Kiudang
- Kampong Luagan Timbaran
- Kampong Mungkom
- Kampong Pad Nunok
- Kampong Pangkalan Mau

=== Lamunin Mukim ===
- Bintudoh
- Biong
- Bukit Bang Dalam
- Bukit Barun
- Bukit Sulang
- Kuala Abang
- Lamunin
- Layong
- Menengah
- Panchong

=== Pekan Tutong Mukim ===
- Bukit Bendera
- Kandang
- Kuala Tutong
- Panchor Dulit
- Panchor Papan
- Paya Pekan Tutong
- Penabai
- Penanjong
- Petani
- Sengkarai
- Serambangun
- Tanah Burok
- Tutong Kem

=== Rambai Mukim ===
- Kampong Rambai
- Kampong Merimbun
- Kampong Kuala Ungar
- Kampong Benutan
- Kampong Batang Piton
- Kampong Sengkowang
- Kampong Pelajau
- Kampong Kerancing
- Kampong Belaban
- Kampong Mapol
- Kampong Supon Besar
- Kampong Supon Kecil
- Kampong Takalit
- Kampong Lalipo
- Kampong Bedawan
- Kampong Belabau

=== Tanjong Maya Mukim ===
- Bangunggos
- Bukit Sibut
- Bukit Udal
- Liulon
- Lubok Pulau
- Padang
- Pemadang
- Penapar
- Sebakit
- Tanjong Maya
- Tanjong Panjang

=== Telisai Mukim ===
- Binchaya
- Bukit Beruang
- Bukit Pasir
- Danau
- Keramut
- Penapar Danau
- Pengkalan Dalai
- Penyatang
- Sungai Paku
- Telamba
- Telisai
- Tumpuan Ugas

=== Ukong Mukim ===
- Kampong Ukong
- Kampong Pengkalan Ran
- Kampong Pengkalan Dong
- Kampong Tong Kundai
- Kampong Nong Anggeh
- Kampong Sungai Damit Ulu
- Kampong Piton nambang
- Kampong Bang Pangan
- Kampong Pak Meligai
- Kampong Pak Bidang
- Kampong Bukit
- Kampong Pengkalan Panchor
- Kampong Talat
- Kampong Melaboi
- Kampong Pengkalan Padang
- Kampong Bang Ligi
- Kampong Litad
- Kampong Bang Bingol
- Kampong Long Mayan
