= Kampong Lugu =

Kampong Lugu Kampung Lugu
- Village
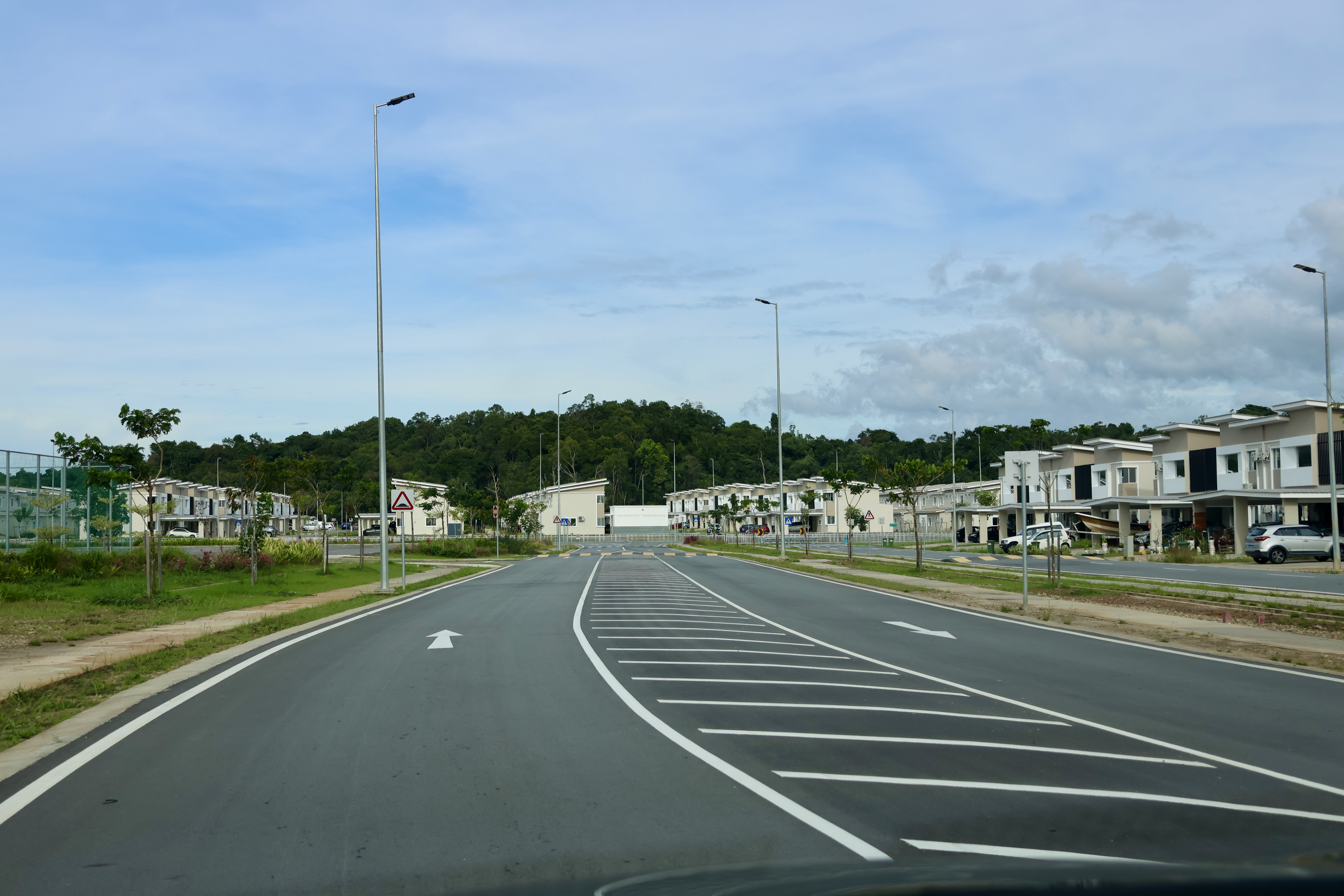
- RPN Kampong Lugu

- Location in Brunei
- Coordinates: 4°52′33″N 114°48′12″E
- Country: Brunei
- District: Brunei–Muara
- Mukim: Sengkurong

Government
  - Village head: Bujang Abdul Ghani

Population (2016)
  - Total: 2,082
- Time zone: UTC+8 (BNT)
- Postcode: BG2921; BG3021 (STRKJ)

Kampong Lugu (Malay: Kampung Lugu) or commonly known as Lugu, is a village situated in Mukim Sengkurong of Brunei–Muara District's western edge. It comprises the original village settlement and the public housing estate RPN Kampong Lugu. The population was 2,082 in 2016.

== Geography ==
Kampong Lugu is located in the westernmost part of Brunei–Muara District and thus borders Tutong District. It neighbours Kampong Katimahar to the south. Lugu Lake is an artificial fresh water lagoon which sits below the RPN Kampong Lugu and along the Muara–Tutong Highway.

== Demography ==
In 2020, the government has projected 9,120 persons in Landless Indigenous Citizens' Housing Scheme (STKRJ) and National Housing Scheme (RPN). Based on data from residential dwellings in STKRJ Kampong Lugu, the number of terraces was 64 in 2016, 27 in May 2017, and 19 in 2019. The majority of the local population is Kedayan.

== Transportation ==
The Ministry of Development (MoD) released the names of the roads that go from STKRJ Kampong Lugu to Jalan Lugu in 2016: Jalan Kibah, Jalan Lasuk, Jalan Basung, Jalan Sungkat, and Jalan Takiding.

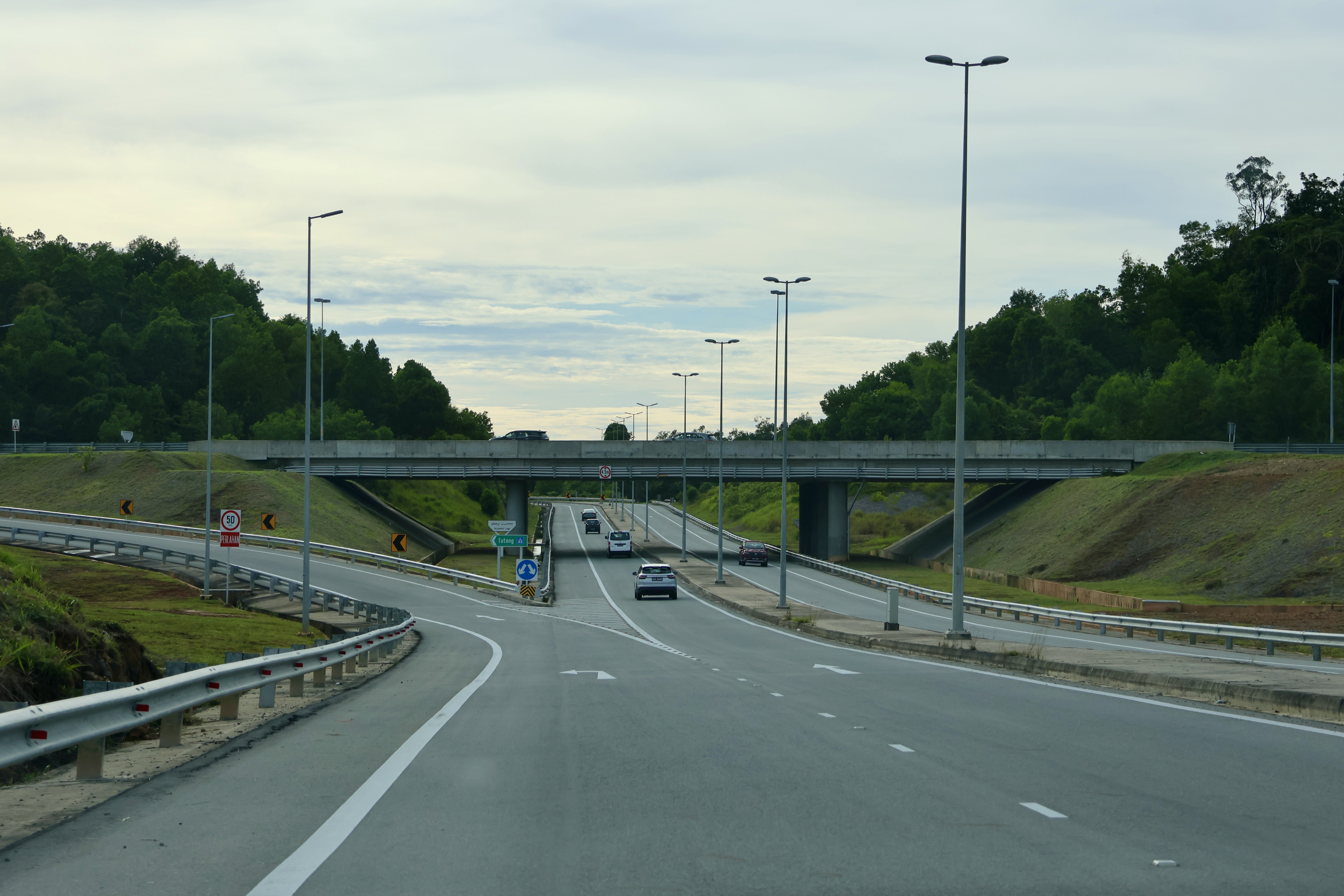
Lugu Flyover în 2025

The Lugu Flyover (Jejambat Lugu), a B$13 million project was formally inaugurated by Minister Suhaimi Gafar, on 20 February 2022. In order to improve road connection for RPN Kampong Lugu projects and to provide essential access to the Muara–Tutong Highway, construction on the project started in November 2019. Residents of RPN Kampong Lugu may travel faster and more easily to Tutong, Belait, Brunei–Muara Districts thanks to the flyover. As part of Brunei's Green National Strategy under Wawasan Brunei 2035, 500 tree seedlings were also planted at the location with the goal of increasing forest coverage and carbon sinks through reforestation.

== Public housing estates ==
The STKRJ began in 2010, is expected to be completed by October 2013, providing 520 units, including 8 semi-detached houses and 502 terrace houses, across 130 hectares (320 acres). The Housing Development Department (HDD) plans to develop the remaining 300 hectares of the Lugu site into 5,000 additional units, focusing on terrace and cluster housing for higher density. Further government housing developments are proposed for areas south of the STKRJ site and a 214 hectares site at the northeastern edge, with up to 6,000 units expected. Overall, the Lugu area could see between 11,000 and 16,000 new dwellings. Additionally, 6,000 houses are being considered for Kampong Keriam in Tutong District, with conceptual layout submissions invited for high-density development in both Lugu and Keriam.

On 2 June 2014, the STKRJ distributed semi-detached houses to remaining 18 people and terraced houses to 331 people in STKRJ Kampong Lugu. On 52.5 hectares (130 acres) of land, 520 housing units—including 18 semi-detached units, 210 "D" terrace houses, 146 "E" terrace houses, and 146 "F" terrace houses—were constructed at STKRJ Kampong Lugu. The "D" Terrace homes are 118 square meters in size, while the semi-detached homes have a floor space of 130 square meters. The homes on the "E" Terrace occupy 103 square meters of space, while the homes on the "F" Terrace occupy 90 square meters.

The 193 hectares (480 acres) RPN Kampong Lugu project started construction in 2014, and the first residents moved in two to three years later. Under the initial RPN Kampong Lugu project, 1,000 cluster home units with a total floor area of 130 square metres (1,400 sq ft) and four bedrooms, bathrooms, and a kitchen have been built as of 18 February 2019. The housing community was designed to include community facilities including a playground, park, school, and mosque. The government of Brunei worked to meet the rising need for reasonably priced housing among its people and residents, which includes this construction.

On 30 January 2021, HDD and the chosen contractor, Swee, signed the contract for the Kampong Lugu Phase II project at the Betabur Hall. Shaharuddin Khairul signed on behalf of the Housing Development Department, while Pengiran Mahalee Damit signed on behalf of Swee, with Petar Perunding and Eco Bumi Arkitek as the suppliers. As part of the 11th National Development Plan (RKN 11), the RPN Kampong Lugu Phase 2 project seeks to construct 1,000 terraced houses with basic utilities including power, water, and roads. The project is being built on a 165 hectares (410 acres) plot and is projected to be finished in 24 months, with a budget surpassing B$108 million. Furthermore, the MoD is carrying out other housing projects via HDD.

During a site visit on 22 January 2022, the Minister stated that despite last year's COVID-19-related setbacks, construction had successfully restarted. According to him, the RPN Kampong Lugu Phase II project's 1,000 housing units should be finished by the end of the year or early in 2023. Furthermore, monitoring is being done on the infrastructure being built at a neighbouring site that would house 500–600 homes on 86 hectares of land. In order to stop the spread of COVID-19, the minister underlined the need of adhering to the Ministry of Health's rules and SOPs, which include social distance, routine testing, and vaccine requirements. He then went to the isolation block that was used during the COVID-19 outbreak in 2021 and examined the temporary staff quarters that housed 363 people.

== Infrastructure ==
One may describe Kampong Lugu as a hamlet without any infrastructure, including mosques, schools, and other buildings. The Kampong Katimahar Primary School was the adjacent village where the village's children used to attend school. But nowadays, the government provides the community with all the amenities it needs, including roads, water, power, and telephones. This is made worse by its relocation, which makes the community always congested with passing traffic. For the time being, the inhabitants are without amenities like mosques and schools. Nonetheless, there is a futsal playing field available for use by the residents.

The Bukit Barun Water Treatment Plant in Kampong Kuala Abang controls the flow of clean water and water pressure to a number of communities, including part of Mukim Pengkalan Batu, Kampong Subok, Kampong Belimbing, and Kampong Batong, Kampong Masin, RPN Kampong Lugu, Jalan Pasir Berakas, RPN Lambak Kanan, and Mukim Lumapas. The Public Works Department (JKR) is the operator of it.

== Lugu Lake ==
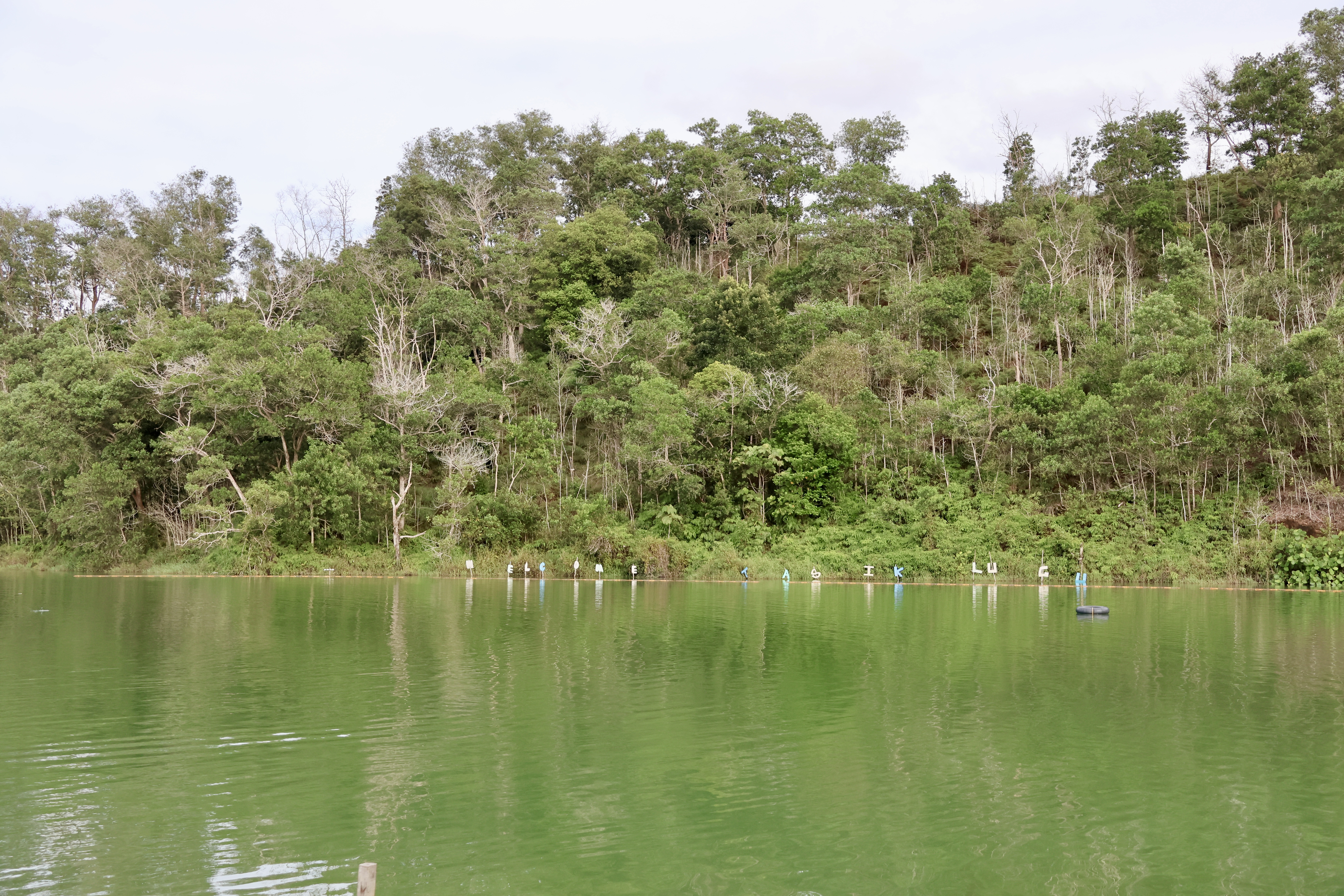
Lugu Lake in 2025

With an approximate length of 300 metres (980 ft) and a width of 80 meters, Lugu Lake (Tasik Lugu) lacks a formal name and oversight body. Salim Adi, the ketua kampung of Katimahar and Lugu, claims that the lake developed organically after the area was dug out for RPN Kampong Lugu, which had been inhabited for a number of years prior to the lake's discovery. Thought to be man-made, the lake organically filled with water and gained notoriety for having exceptionally pure water—a feature uncommon among comparable borrow pits constructed during major building projects. Early in 2016, Ronin Lim's free dive film, which featured the lake's crystal-clear waters and tiny fauna, became viral on YouTube, receiving over 6,000 views. This helped the lake become more well known.

An explanation of the lake's formation by Haji Safar bin Abdul Rahim @ Durahim, a former ketua kampung and original inhabitant, came from the blockage of Sungai Tampangan's downstream waters during road building for home development. Before, the region was a low, level area with a small pond where the residents played and took baths. The lake was formed over time by the stagnant water and is now home to a variety of fish species and is a well-liked tourist destination. The lake is regularly used by tourists for leisure pursuits including kayaking, swimming, and watersports. On weekends, people visit the lake because of its tranquil ambience and stunning blue-green appearance, and local vendors frequently set up shop nearby to serve tourists.

== See also ==
- List of public housing estates in Brunei
