= Kampong Kulapis =

- Village
- Location in Brunei
- Coordinates: 4°51′15″N 114°49′17″E
- Country: Brunei
- District: Brunei–Muara
- Mukim: Sengkurong

Government
  - Village head: Asyramisyanie Kamis

Area
  - Total: 486.71 ha (1,202.7 acres)

Population (2016)
  - Total: 1,766
  - Density: 362.8/km^{2} (939.8/sq mi)
- Time zone: UTC+8 (BNT)
- Postcode: BG2521

Kampong Kulapis is a village in Mukim Sengkurong of Brunei–Muara District, Brunei, about 13 miles (21 km) from the capital Bandar Seri Begawan. It is primarily accessible by land transport. The majority of the village's population consists of the Kedayan ethnic group, although there are also other ethnicities residing in the area. As of 2016, Kampong Kulapis has a population of 1,766 people residing in 156 houses, predominantly practicing Islam, including 516 members of the Kedayan community, and covers an area of 486.71 hectares (1,202.7 acres).

== Etymology ==
Initially, Kampong Kulapis was a small village that eventually merged with Kampong Damuan, which served as an upstream port on the Damuan River. This location was a stopping point for traders looking to engage with local inland communities. The name "Kampong Kulapis" is derived from a specific type of wood known as Kulapis. Despite its relatively small beginnings, the village grew through this merger, taking on the name Kulapis, which reflected its connection to both the wood and the river.

The origins of Kampong Kulapis are not fully established, with various claims about its history. One claim suggests that the name changed from "Damuan" to "Kulapis" around the mid-19th century, as the Damuan River was a vital communication route for traders from the 10th century until the 19th century. The name "Kulapis" is also linked to a significant event involving a large number of kulapis fish that swam upstream, obstructing the river and preventing traders from accessing their destinations. This occurrence highlighted the importance of the river as a trade route and contributed to the village's identity and name.

== Geography ==
The adjacent villages include Kampong Tanjong Nangka to the north, Kampong Mulaut to the north-east, Kampong Bebatik to the east and south-east, Kampong Batong to the south and south-west, and Kampong Katimahar to the west and north-west. The village is hilly, forested, lowland and marshy suitable for farming.

== Administration ==
The ketua kampung (village head) plays a vital role in managing the affairs and welfare of Kampong Kulapis. Traditionally chosen by the villagers based on qualities such as strength and capability rather than lineage, the position is now filled through elections organized by the Brunei–Muara District Office. Notable individuals who have held the position include Haji Aspar bin Langgar, Haji Puasa bin Mohammad, Haji Hussin bin Orang Kaya Jumat, and Haji Nayan bin Apong and Haji Timur bin Limbang. The village head is responsible for distributing pensions to the elderly and widows, attending weekly meetings, and addressing the community's needs while fostering unity among residents. The appointment process now involves a voting system, requiring all villagers aged 12 and above to participate in electing a suitable candidate for the role.

== Economy ==
The residents of Kampong Kulapis derive their income from various activities, including agriculture, rubber tapping, and bird catching. Rice cultivation is a significant source of income and remains a traditional practice that sustains their livelihoods. Typically, they plant rice once a year, whether it be lowland rice or hill rice. The two cultivation methods differ significantly in execution, and the yields from each are also distinct. In the past, the harvests from rice farming or gardening were not sold but rather exchanged for other goods through a barter trade system, with some produce kept for personal use.

== Demography ==
The total population at this point is about 1,706 people including 99 elderly people and 28 orphans. The ethnicity of Kampong Kulapis is the Kedayan ethnicity and their occupation is mostly farming and breeding. When the fruit season arrives, many residents of Kampong Kulapis set up permanent or temporary huts to be used as a place to sell their fruits. Fruits are picked or collected from privately owned pulau buah (fruit orchards) close to their homes and also from their crops in Bukit Panjang.

== Infrastructure ==
Kampong Kulapis has seen significant improvements in basic facilities and services over the years. Public transportation, including taxis and buses, operates daily to connect the village with Bandar Seri Begawan, while paved roads facilitate easy access to important locations and workplaces. Children from the village attend Awang Haji Mohammad Yussof Katimahar Primary School, and secondary students go to Masin Secondary School and Saiyiddina Hussin Secondary School in Jerudong. The Sengkurong Clinic serves as a health center for the residents of Kampong Kulapis and surrounding areas. Essential services such as electricity, water supply, and telephone connectivity have greatly enhanced the quality of life for the villagers.

The government's efforts have transformed the living conditions in Kampong Kulapis, where previously, residents had limited access to education and basic amenities. In the past, the village lacked a formal school, and education was primarily provided by elders teaching Quranic studies for free. Initially, the school was only open to male students. Prior to road construction, villagers relied on narrow jungle paths, known as "salok-salok kerbau," for transportation. Water was sourced from rivers and stored in hand-dug wells, which were typically located far from homes, requiring water to be transported using a tumpong. Additionally, before electricity was introduced, residents used kerosene lamps for nighttime illumination. The Pehin Khatib Abdullah Mosque, inaugurated in May 2017 by Sultan Hassanal Bolkiah, further highlights the community's development, accommodating 700 worshippers as a waqf (endowment) donated by an anonymous benefactor.
