= Kampong Limau Manis =

Village in Brunei

- Village
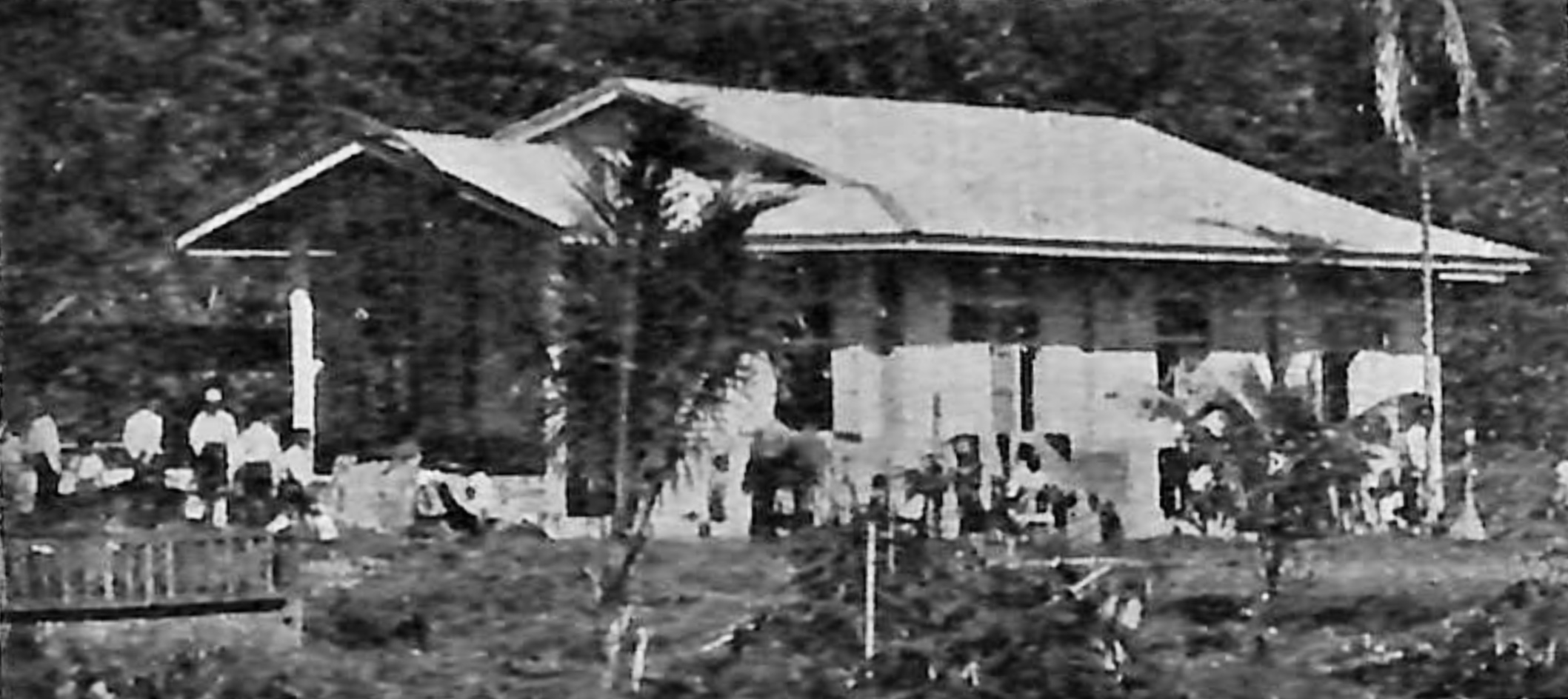
- Limau Manis Mosque in 1967

- Location in Brunei
- Coordinates: 4°46′06″N 114°49′25″E
- Country: Brunei
- District: Brunei-Muara
- Mukim: Pengkalan Batu

Government
  - Village head: Mohaimin Johari

Population (2016)
  - Total: 1,097
- Time zone: UTC+8 (BNT)
- Postcode: BH2323

Kampong Limau Manis is a village in the south-west of Brunei-Muara District, Brunei. The population was 1,097 in 2016. It is one of the villages within Mukim Pengkalan Batu, a mukim in the district. It is home to an important archaeological site in the country, dating back to the 10th century AD. Their primary economic activities were agriculture and collecting forest products.

== Etymology ==
Kampong Limau Manis is the Malay name which translates as "Limau Manis Village". The village is said to be named after a citrus tree grown at a riverbank in the village which was deemed special as it bore very sweet fruits, hence the name limau manis (lit. 'sweet citrus'). The riverbank then is said to have had a jetty (pangkalan) and the place was then named Pangkalan Limau Manis, and the village was eventually named after the jetty.

== Geography ==
Approximately 25 kilometers separate Bandar Seri Begawan from Kampong Limau Manis, which is part of Mukim Pengkalan Batu, despite the fact that, in accordance with earlier elders' accounts, Limau Manis was a mukim up to the early 1960s. The community is surrounded by hills: Bukit Basungan, Bukit Bandung, Bukit Kota, Bukit Gadong, and Ipai Limbang village. Bukit Kota is the tallest of them, standing at 133 meters (436 feet) above sea level. Kampong Kuala Lurah, Jalan Sekolah Limau Manis, and Jalan Junjongan are a few of the nearby communities.

== Demography ==
There were over 2,000 villagers in the village head Awang Haji Mohimin bin Haji Johari's care, and he has constructed about 220 homes. The Murut and Bisaya tribes, followed by the Kedayan tribe, were the Kampong Limau Manis' first occupants, according to historical sources. Various tribes now make up the population of this village, particularly the Brunei Malay, Dusun, Iban, Chinese, and Indian tribes that are involved in commerce.

== History ==
According to the local oral tradition, the area and its vicinity were once home to a non-Muslim indigenous people and in the 15th century ruled by a leader named Raja Lumbi. The oral tradition also mentioned of a fight between the said leader with his followers, and a group of Muslim inhabitants led by a Muslim missionary named Sharif Mohammad or Sharif Alwi. The present-day village is believed to have existed since 200–250 years ago. According to a 1906 document, the village was formerly part of the district of Limau Manis (also known as Ulu Brunei), one of the six districts of Brunei at the time, before being merged with other districts to become the present-day Brunei-Muara District.

The Kampong Limau Manis neighborhood was larger than it is today; it was formerly a part of Kampong Wasan (where the original boundary was Tajau River), of Kampong Batu Ampar (where one place was known as Durian Mahligai), and of Jalan Junjongan (where Mengatai River, now the settlement's origin, was Kampong Burung Pingai Air, now a part of Kampong Junjongan). Pengkalan Limau Manis is the main business center (pengalu) which functions as the ulu of Brunei River with the main connection through Limau Manis River to the Pusat Bandar.

== Archaeology ==
Sungai Limau Manis, an archaeological region was found in 2002. Despite being distant from Brunei Bay, this location holds great significance for the early history of the sultanate that formerly surrounded the bay. Archaeological discoveries in the region indicate that a civilisation existed in Sungai Limau Manis from the 10th to the 13th centuries. This theory is supported by the finding of Chinese ceiling coins and ceramics from the Song (960–1296) and Yuan (1206–2368) dynasties, as well as by items from the "material culture" that attest to the area's previous inhabitants.

Research in this river has produced pottery pieces and Chinese coins that demonstrate that, prior to Kota Batu becoming the seat of administration for the Sultanate of Brunei in the 15th century, Sungai Limau Manis was the most significant trading hub in Brunei. Vast amounts of porcelain, stoneware, and earthenware in the shapes of bowls, plates, bottles, gums, and urns have been discovered among the many varieties of Chinese pottery from the Sung and Yuan Dynasties. In addition to Chinese ceramics, relatively little Siamese and Vietnamese ceramics were discovered. The Department of Brunei Museums successfully gathered 50,979 shards of pottery in Sungai Limau Manis in 2002, accounting for 96.85% of the collection as a whole.

At 1,047 pieces, the collection of Chinese coins from the Sung and Yuan periods is the second biggest discovered in Sungai Limau Manis and the largest quantity discovered in the archeological area of Brunei to date. Unexpectedly, a mound of pennies on the banks of the site was the sole place where all the coins were discovered. Furthermore, remnants and artefacts that demonstrate the high level of civilisation of the people who lived along the Sungai Limau Manis have also been discovered there. This is demonstrated by the finding of metalworking tools including earth molds for the production of copper, silver, and gold, as well as carpentry tools like fabric weaving equipment. Along with a variety of glass beads and bracelets, gold jewelry including earrings, rings, bracelets, and gold leaf has also been discovered during excavations along the banks of the site. Additionally, everyday wooden items including rice mills, mortars, gagawi, and spoons were discovered, along with games and accessories like tops and gasing.

Based on the archeological discoveries at Sungai Limau Manis, it is evident that the locals had opulent lives befitting their status as the city's port. Are the locals connected to Zhu Fan Zhi's account of the residents of Brunei (Puni) in the 10th century, who are reported to have had gold decorations and domestic utensils. The precise site of the Kingdom of Brunei, as stated in Zhu Fan Zhi, remains unconfirmed; nonetheless, the archaeological discoveries in the river amply demonstrate that a kingdom was created there during the 10th and 13th centuries. Given that Zhu Fan Zhi states that Brunei held 14 colonial territories in 977, it is also plausible that Sungai Limau Manis was one of Brunei's colonial possessions in the 10th century.

The oral history of Brunei, particularly the accounts recorded in Syair Awang Semaun about an aboriginal monarchy ruled by the monarchy of Melanau, was validated by the archeological finds in Sungai Limau Manis. Before Awang Alak Betatar established the Brunei empire in Borneo, Sungai Limau Manis was a significant area of Brunei, governed by a man by the name of Basiong, who declared loyalty to the Melanau Kingdom, according to the poem.

The Sungai Limau Manis archaeological site was the largest and richest archeological finding in the country. The 100-acre (40 ha) site has since been gazetted under the 1967 Antiquities and Treasure Trove Act.

== Economy ==
In 2013, the 50 hectares (120 acres) Laila Rice Planting Project in the Bunga Cawan Rice Site area was implemented. The Limau Manis Village Consultative Council (MPK) rice plantation is located on the site of the Gazette of the Department of Agriculture and Agri-Food (JPA) with an area of 50 hectares and is cultivated by 21 entrepreneurs. MPK Limau Manis registered with JPA at the beginning of October 2013 and started cleaning the fields until 9 November 2013 for which the Rice Planting Launch Ceremony was held on 11 November 2013. The monitoring of the status and development of the farm is held throughout the planting season until the production of the produce where before starting this project, new members and junior members of MPK Limau Manis have attended a basic course on rice cultivation management (RFFS) at JPA. The result of this Rice Farming School (SPP) has been able to contribute to the improvement of good rice management knowledge, besides the MPK Limau Manis has also successfully implemented an agricultural youth training program through a rice planting project at the Agricultural Development Area site. The rice yield from the MPK Limau Manis farm is estimated to be around 150 metric tons per year, which can certainly contribute to the country's total rice yield. This company will also be able to help farm operators increase their source of income.

== Infrastructure ==
The village primary school is Panglima Barudin Primary School.

Kampong Limau Manis Mosque is the village mosque; it was built in 1994 and can accommodate 1,200 worshippers.

The village is home to Pengkalan Batu Health Centre, the community health centre for the residents of Mukim Pengkalan Batu.
