= Kampong Pengkalan Batu =

- Village
- Location in Brunei
- Coordinates: 4°47′53″N 114°49′40″E
- Country: Brunei
- District: Brunei-Muara
- Mukim: Pengkalan Batu

Government
  - Village head: Haikal Kahar

Population (2016)
  - Total: 1,007
- Time zone: UTC+8 (BNT)
- Postcode: BH1123

Kampong Pengkalan Batu (also Kampong Pangkalan Batu) is a village in Brunei-Muara District, Brunei, about 19 kilometres (12 mi) from the capital Bandar Seri Begawan. The population was 1,007 in 2016. It is one of the villages within Mukim Pengkalan Batu.

== Geography ==
The village is located in the south-west of Brunei-Muara District. As a village subdivision, it shares boundaries with Kampong Parit to the north, Kampong Junjongan to the east, Kampong Batu Ampar to the south, Kampong Wasan to the south-west, Kampong Panchor Murai to the west, and Kampong Batong to the north-west.

== Facilities ==
Pengkalan Batu Primary School is the village primary school. It also shares grounds with Pengkalan Batu Religious School, the village school for the country's Islamic religious primary education.

Kampong Pengkalan Batu Mosque is the village mosque; it was inaugurated on 6 January 1984 and can accommodate 200 worshippers.
