= Kampong Imang =

- Village
- Location in Brunei
- Coordinates: 4°47′28″N 114°48′03″E
- Country: Brunei
- District: Brunei-Muara
- Mukim: Pengkalan Batu

Population (2016)
  - Total: 16
- Time zone: UTC+8 (BNT)
- Postcode: BH2623

Kampong Imang is a village in the south-west of Brunei-Muara District, Brunei. The population was 16 in 2016. It is one of the villages within Mukim Pengkalan Batu. The postcode is BH2623.

The village is home to Imang Reservoir which is the main source of water for the agricultural activities in the district.

== Geography ==
As a village subdivision, Kampong Imang borders Kampong Panchor Murai to the north, Kampong Wasan to the east and south, Kampong Birau to the south-west, Kampong Luagan Timbaran to the west, and Kampong Maraburong to the north-west.
