= Kampong Kuala Lurah =

Kuala Lurah Kampung Kuala Lurah
- Village
- Kampong Kuala Lurah
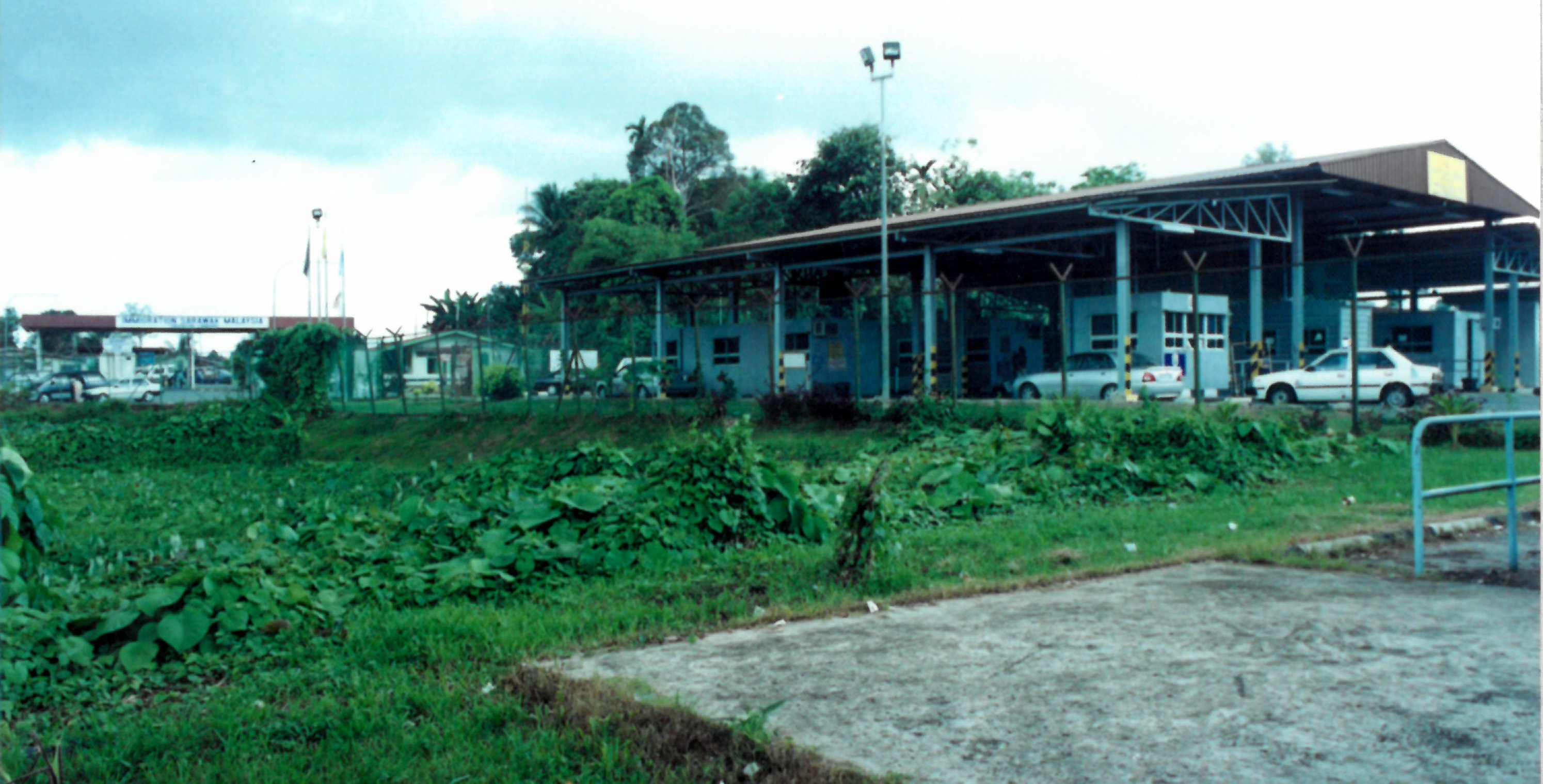
- Kuala Lurah checkpoint

- Location in Brunei
- Coordinates: 4°45′12″N 114°49′06″E
- Country: Brunei
- District: Brunei-Muara
- Mukim: Pengkalan Batu

Population (2016)
  - Total: 798
- Time zone: UTC+8 (BNT)
- Postcode: BH1923

Kampong Kuala Lurah (or simply Kuala Lurah) is a village in the south-west of Brunei-Muara District, Brunei, immediately adjacent to the Brunei-Malaysia border. The population was 798 in 2016. It serves as the vehicular entry point to mainland part of the country from Limbang District in the Malaysian state of Sarawak. It is one of the villages within Mukim Pengkalan Batu. The postcode is BH1923.

== Etymology ==
The villages that surround Kampong Limau Manis include Kuala Lurah, Jalan Sekolah Limau Manis, and Jalan Junjungan, which was once known as Kampong Pengucauan in the 1960s. According to local history, before Kuala Lurah was given a name. The village was one of the marshy paths connecting Bukit Belading and the hill close to Kampong Bebuloh. Residents of Kampong Tedungan and the surrounding areas, such as those from Bebuloh to Pengkalan Limau Manis, use this swamp road as a means of commerce with the pengalu (main business center) from Brunei Town. It also serves as a social route for the village in Ulu (Inner) Kampong Limau Manis, connecting them to the people of Limau Manis and, ultimately, to the connecting road to Brunei Town.

Due to the peat swamp nature of this route, the villagers utilise buffaloes to pull kuntols (traditional wood-based mode of transportation) to deliver their wares. Kuala Lurah was the name given by the lurah (headman) as a result of the people's move to Kampong Limau Manis to the Kuala (estuary). The people living in Limau Manis also include the people living in this village.

== Geography ==
Kampong Belading is bordered by Kuala Lurah, a kampong under Limau Manis. Additionally, it is bordered by several hills named Bukit Basungan and Bukit Bandung.

== Demography ==
The Muruts and Bisayas were followed by the Kedayans as the inhabitants of Kampong Limau Manis and Kuala Lurah, according to historical documents. Many tribes, including the Brunei Malays, Dusun Muslim, the Iban Muslim, the Chinese, and the Indian and Chinese immigrants who trade, make up the kampong's population nowadays.

== Kuala Lurah checkpoint ==
Kampong Kuala Lurah, formerly known as Kampong Belading, ends at the Kuala Lurah checkpoint. Although it was governed by Brunei in the early 1970s, Kampong Belading is today under the jurisdiction of Limbang. Commencing operations on 1 November 1989, this checkpoint is unique for both foot traffic and land transportation.
