= Kampong Parit, Pengkalan Batu =

Parit
- Village
- Kampong Parit
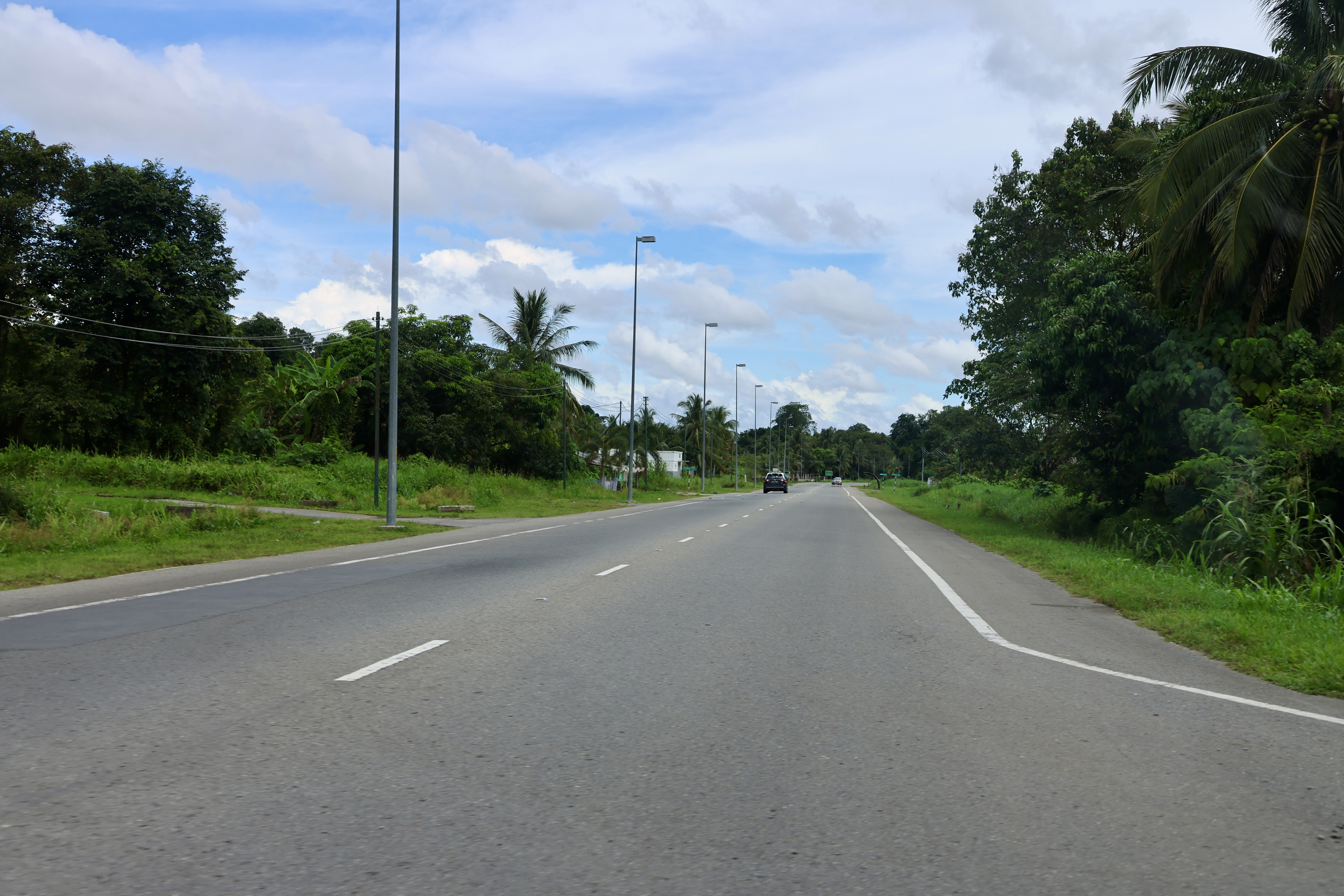
- Jalan Mulaut - Limau Manis

- Location in Brunei
- Coordinates: 4°48′47″N 114°50′11″E
- Country: Brunei
- District: Brunei-Muara
- Mukim: Pengkalan Batu

Population (2016)
  - Total: 1,299
- Time zone: UTC+8 (BNT)
- Postcode: BH1023

Kampong Parit is a village in the south-west of Brunei-Muara District, Brunei. The population was 1,299 in 2016. It is one of the villages within Mukim Pengkalan Batu. The postcode is BH1023.

== Geography ==
As a village subdivision, Kampong Parit is bounded by Kampong Masin to the north, Kampong Junjongan to the east, Kampong Pengkalan Batu to the south, Kampong Panchor Murai to the south-west, and Kampong Batong to the west.

== Economy ==
=== Agriculture ===
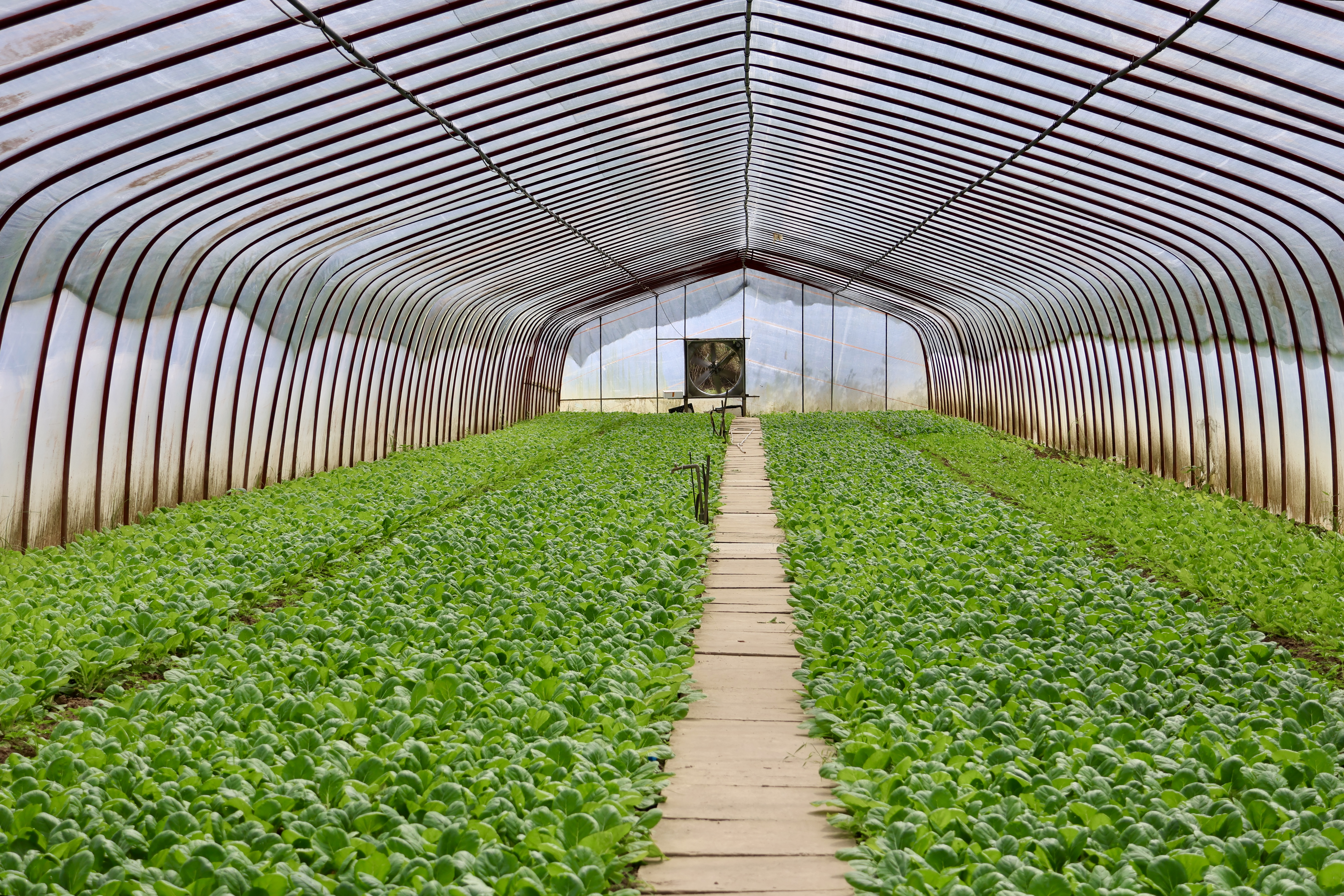
Tunas Harapan Agricultural Farm

Ladang Syarikat Tunas Harapan Agricultural Farm Sdn Bhd high-yield paddy field is situated in Kampong Masin's Sibongkok Agricultural Development Area (KKK Sibongkok). The farm covers 20 hectares with drip irrigation and a greenhouse system. Seasonal fruits and vegetables are grown on the farm. The farm started operating in 2000. In 2006, a 12-hectare plot was built for the purpose of planting more crops. In August 2017, an additional 20 hectares of land were permitted for agricultural farming.

Lau Ah Kok founded the Hua Ho Agricultural Farm in 1947. In 1999, the Ladang Syarikat Tunas Harapan Agricultural Farm situated in Kampong Masin's Sibongkok Agricultural Development Area (KKK Sibongkok), was granted a 12 hectares (30 acres) plot of agricultural land by the Department of Agriculture and Agrifood (DoAA). The high-yield paddy field is equip with drip irrigation and a greenhouse system. The farm started operating in September 2000. In 2006, a 12 hectare plot was built for the purpose of planting more crops. In August 2017, an additional 20 hectares of land were permitted for agricultural farming.

On 15 April 2014, DoAA recognised Hua Ho Agricultural Farm and Ladang Tunas Harapan farms, both managed by Lau How Teck, with the Brunei Darussalam GAP (Good Agricultural Practice) mark. The farm supplies its goods to its commercial outlets. It grows fruits and vegetables such guava, dragon fruit, star fruit, and fig. The farm produced around 104 metric tons, worth at B$280,000, as of September 2018 alone. As of April 2020, the farms produce fruits, vegetables, birds, and eggs.

Agricultural technologies, such as biopesticide and polytunnel, have reduced insect infestations and minimised chemical use, improving crop quality and quantity. Additionally, the farm enhances soil nutrients with natural compost made from chicken dung, which lowers the need for fertilisers and results in safer goods. However, problems like flooding during the rainy season have harmed crops, indicating that in order to maintain output in the future, retention ponds and improved drainage are necessary.
