= Kampong Panchor Murai =

- Village
- Location in Brunei
- Coordinates: 4°48′16″N 114°48′40″E
- Country: Brunei
- District: Brunei-Muara
- Mukim: Pengkalan Batu

Government
  - Village head: Ismail Jumat

Area
  - Total: 529.74 ha (1,309.0 acres)

Population (2016)
  - Total: 523
  - Density: 98.7/km^{2} (256/sq mi)
- Time zone: UTC+8 (BNT)
- Postcode: BH3123

Kampong Panchor Murai is a village in the south-west of Brunei-Muara District, Brunei, about 22 kilometres (14 mi) from the capital Bandar Seri Begawan. The population was 523 in 2016. It is one of the villages within Mukim Pengkalan Batu. The postcode is BH3123. Notably, the village is the namesake of the Brunei Super League's Panchor Murai FC.

== Etymology ==
There are a few additional well-known geographical names that people mistakenly believe come from animals. Pancur Murai is one (Murai is a type of magpie-robin bird). The name Pancur Murai, however, is said to have originated from the mythology of a princess by the name of Puteri Bongsu Kembang Kiapu who had a guard by the name of Samurai. The Princess desired to take a bath from a pancur when she was living in a luagan, a small swampy lake. A pancur is similar to a natural shower since it involves water that sprouts or squirts out of a natural source. She then requested Samurai make it. Samurai searched the area until they found it, then they erected it according to the Princess's instructions. The Princess had a bath there once it was finished. Because to its notoriety, the location was given the name Pancur Samurai, which later changed to Pancur Murai.

== Geography ==
As a village subdivision, it borders Kampong Batong to the north, Kampong Parit to the north-east, Kampong Parit to the east, Kampong Pengkalan Batu to the south-east, Kampong Wasan and Kampong Imang to the south, and Kampong Maraburong in Tutong District to the west.

== History ==
According to the Head of Panchor Murai Village, Awang Haji Matassan bin Haji Salleh, so far it is not yet known when this village was opened or the founder of this village. However, according to the early residents who inhabited this village area, the residents are believed to be from among those who like to move to rural areas because they want to find work or livelihood. After they were active in agriculture such as cultivating crops, growing rice and raising animals, then the cultivated area eventually became a village and it began to flourish. In the past, pengalu (traders) who traveled from the capital via Imang River, also called Pengkalan Imang, used to congregate at Kampong Panchor Murai.

== Economy ==
On a limited scale and in response to public orders, some peasants produce kerisik. However, local stores have not yet received this kerisik from the manufacturer.

== Demography ==
There were 99 dwellings in the community overall, housing 450 people. There are a total of 230 female people and 220 male persons. There are now 39 old persons in total. In this community, there are 92 different sexes, the majority of whom work for the government, the business sector, or are independent contractors. Farmers make up the bulk of the self-employed.

== Infrastructure ==
This community, like others, has access to basic services such power, water, telephones, roads, a primary school, a religious school, and access to the Mukim Pengkalan Batu clinic. There is also a sepak takraw court available for the inhabitants' amusement. Kampong Panchor Murai does not yet have any interesting places that stand out but this village has one potentially interesting place to visit, which is Wasai Abdul (Abdul Waterfall). So far the wasai has not yet been advanced. In addition, there is also a water dam called Imang Water Dam. This dam is used to irrigate rice fields and orchards. The dam, which was built over 10 years ago, has become an attraction for anglers to catch fish.

- Panchor Murai Primary school is the village primary school, whereas Panchor Murai Religious School is the village school for the country's Islamic religious primary education.
- Pancho Murai Religious School
- Kampong Panchor Murai Mosque is the village mosque; it was inaugurated on 14 April 1983 and can accommodate 200 worshippers.
