= Kampong Kapok =

Village in Brunei

Kampong Kapok Kampung Kapok
- Village
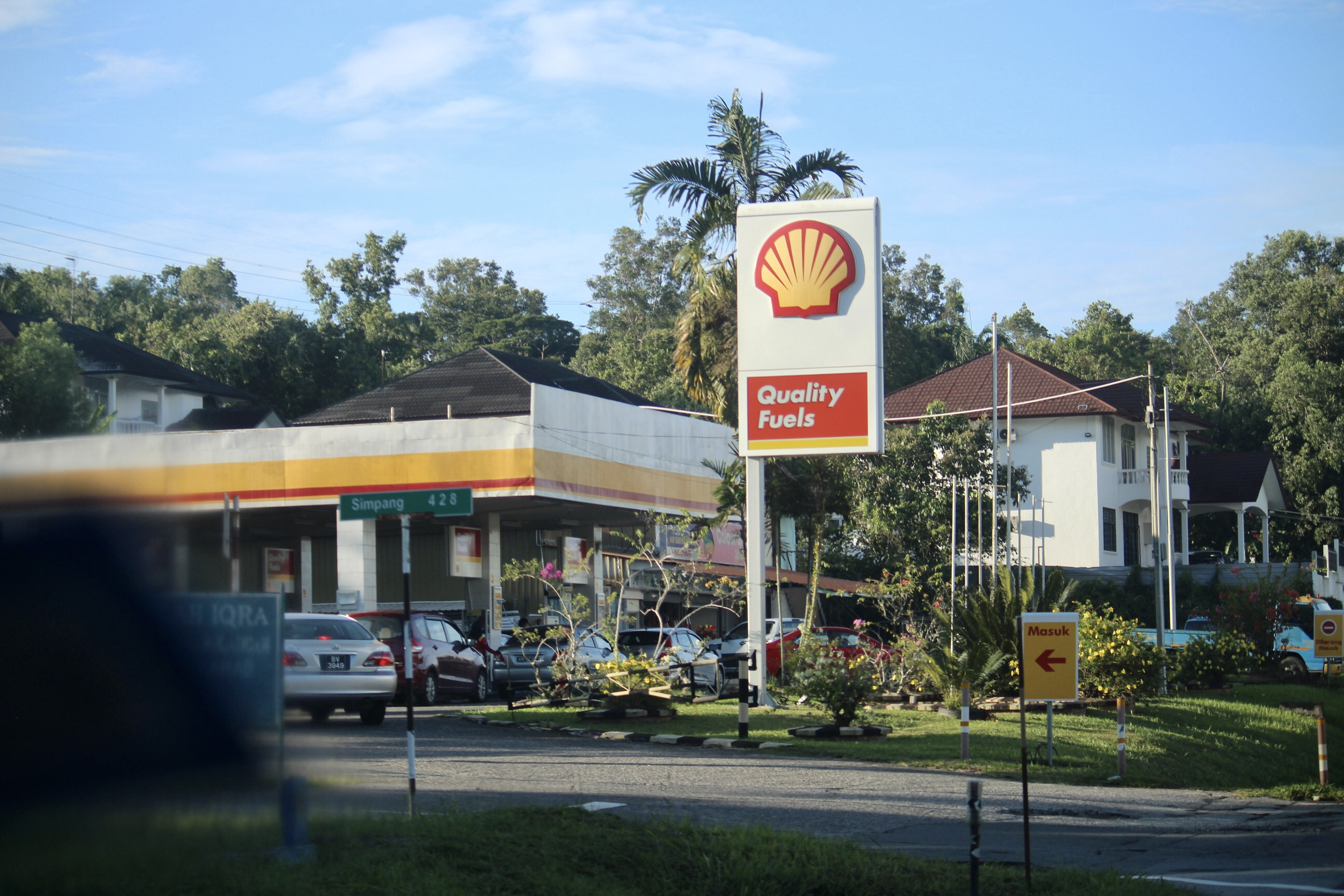
- Kampong Kapok petrol station in 2022

- Location in Brunei
- Coordinates: 5°01′22″N 115°02′43″E
- Country: Brunei
- District: Brunei-Muara
- Mukim: Serasa

Government
  - Village head: Shahminan Abdul Rahman

Area
  - Total: 1,241.01 ha (3,066.6 acres)

Population (2016)
  - Total: 2,791
  - Density: 224.9/km^{2} (582.5/sq mi)
- Time zone: UTC+8 (BNT)
- Postcode: BT2328

Kampong Kapok is a village in the north-east of Brunei-Muara District, Brunei and has an area of 1,241.01 hectares (3,066.6 acres); the population was 2,791 in 2016.

== Etymology ==
The village is named after the kapok tree, Bombax ceiba, that cane be seen in its immediate surroundings. In addition to moss, the locals at the time also profited from the usage of Kapok fruits as cushions. People who are either from the location in question or who desire to visit it also refer to themselves as "from Kapok" or "want to go to Kapok" using the phrase. The usage of the name Kapok persisted after then, and the community came to be known as Kampung Kapok. A joint effort from MPK Kapok to preserve the history of taking the name of this village has been implemented. Some kapok saplings are planted in some strategic places. Kapok tree saplings along the road of Kampong Kapok and in some houses were planted.

== Geography ==
Kampong Kapok is one of the villages in Mukim Serasa, a mukim in the district. As a village subdivision, it borders Kampong Sabun to the north-east, Kampong Serasa to the east and south, Kampong Salar to the south-west and Kampong Meragang to the west and north. It is one of the villages along Jalan Muara, a road which links Bandar Seri Begawan to Muara town. The village is situated between Bukit Tempayan Pisang and the South China Sea, about 4 kilometres (2.5 mi) from Pekan Muara and 23 kilometers from Bandar Seri Begawan.

== Economy ==
The banana chip products from the hamlet are well-known; they come in six flavors: original, durian, milo, maize, pandan, and coffee. Awang Haji Marali claims that despite the unfavorable reaction, coffee-flavored banana chips are rarely made available, but the villagers would be happy to produce them if there was a demand from the general public. Future iterations of this product will have some new, intriguing patterns and tastes. Nowadays, items are made using more complex and contemporary methods. As a result, the product yield has increased due to the manufacture of items using machines.

== Infrastructure ==
=== Education ===
- Kapok Primary School — a government primary school
- SECA School (Sekolah Cemerlang Abejess) — a private primary school

=== Religion ===
Kampong Kapok Mosque is the village mosque; it was completed in 1996 and can accommodate 700 worshippers.

=== Bukit Tempayan Pisang ===
Bukit Tempayan Pisang Recreational Park is a recreation area at Bukit Tempayan Pisang, a forested hill located between the village and Kampong Serasa. It was inaugurated in 2013 by the then Minister of Home Affairs. The park has walkways built along the trails in the forest and provides hiking opportunity. According to local lore, Bukit Tempayan Pisang Kapok was originally thought to be the residence of the mythical beings known as Bunian princesses, who played with 'kemala' stones that had 'celestial' abilities on the 14th and 15th days of the month and during full moons.

The Bunian princesses and the keeper of Mount Kinabalu got into a fight because of the stones' paranormal abilities. The protector of Mount Kinabalu employed a mortar in the conflict to seize the mystical stones, but the Bunian princesses only had access to banana stems, which they contained in huge clay jars (tempayan). Only two of the stones were retained by the princesses; the guardian of Mount Kinabalu took possession of the other five. The princesses nevertheless played with the two leftover stones under the full moon. According to legend, until the 1940s, locals could see lights streaming from the Bukit Tempayan Pisang every full moon.

The tales also relate to the two caverns, Radat Cave and Harimau Cave, which are situated somewhere near the summit of the hill. Awang Radat, a Kampong Serasa inhabitant renowned for his valor and eerie abilities, inspired the name Radat Cave. It was rumored that he frequently visited the cave, especially during full moons, to meet a Bunian princess, whom he subsequently wed.

As its name implies, two tigers were originally said to have lived in the Harimau (Tiger) cave. The story goes that Awang Mawar and Dayang Mawar, a newlywed couple, were crossing Bukit Tempayan Pisang on foot from Kampong Serasa to Tanjung Kemuning in Kampong Kapok. The woman had to halt during the trip, but she urged that the husband go on and that she would follow. The guy eventually turned around after realizing that his wife had fallen behind and was unable to keep up, only to discover his wife's bloody garments, ripped clothing, and tiger paw prints on the ground. The paw prints guided him to the cave, where he witnessed two tigers consuming his wife, who was already dead. Even though he was successful in killing the tigers, his grief and remorse over the passing of his wife finally drove him to commit suicide.

== Achievement ==
In 2014, the village won the Silver Medal of the Excellent Village Award (Anugerah Kampung Cemerlang), a national award recognising initiatives by villages in improving social and socio-economic conditions of their communities. It is the first village in the country to achieve the aforementioned medal recognition.
