= Kampong Batong =

Village in Brunei

- Village
- Location in Brunei
- Coordinates: 4°49′30″N 114°49′06″E
- Country: Brunei
- District: Brunei-Muara
- Mukim: Pengkalan Batu

Government
  - Village head: Saban Lamat

Area
  - Total: 978.07 ha (2,416.9 acres)

Population (2016)
  - Total: 1,225
  - Density: 125.2/km^{2} (324.4/sq mi)
- Time zone: UTC+8 (BNT)
- Postcode: BH2923

Kampong Batong is a village in the south-west of Brunei-Muara District, Brunei, about 20.5 kilometres (12.7 mi) from the capital Bandar Seri Begawan. It has an area of 978.07 hectares (2,416.9 acres); the population was 1,225 in 2016. It is one of the villages within Mukim Pengkalan Batu. The postcode is BH2923.

== Geography ==
As a village subdivision, Kampong Batong borders Kampong Katimahar and Kampong Kulapis to the north, Kampong Bebatik and Kampong Masin to the north-east, Kampong Parit to the east, Kampong Pengkalan Batu to the south-east, Kampong Panchor Murai to the south, and Kampong Maraburong and Kampong Kupang in Tutong District to the west.

== Demography ==
As of 2015, 1,453 people call Kampung Batong home, with 1,200 of them being Malays and the remaining Iban, Bisaya, and Chinese. Out of that total, 68 individuals are pensioners, four individuals received assistance from the Jabatan Pembangunan Masyarakat (JAPEM), two individuals received assistance for the poor, seven individuals received assistance for orphans, and two further individuals received assistance for individuals with mental illnesses.

== Infrastructure ==
The Bruneian government provided the community with necessities including roads, water supply, power, and telephones. The Jefri Bolkiah Mosque, which began construction in November 2011 and was inaugurated on 26 July 2013 as part of the 2007-2012 National Development Plan (RKN) project at a cost of roughly BND 2.1 million. The entire capacity of the mosque can accommodate approximately 800 pilgrims, among the facilities available are prayer halls for men and women, muzakarah room, Mosque Affairs Officer/Imam/Bilal room, special guest room, library and IT, lecture room, PA System room, store, mortuary, management room, kitchen, men's and women's toilets and separate ablutions for men and women.

For the convenience of the residents of the mukim to hold various social activities, the takmir of the mosque took place at the Jefri Bolkiah Mosque and at the house of the village chief. Meanwhile, in order to carry out sports activities, the residents of the village share the Panchor Murai Primary School sports field with other villages under Mukim Pengkalan Batu.
