= Kampong Batang Perhentian =

Batang Perhentian
- Village
- Kampong Batang Perhentian
- Location in Brunei
- Coordinates: 4°45′45″N 114°48′44″E
- Country: Brunei
- District: Brunei-Muara
- Mukim: Pengkalan Batu

Area
  - Total: 124.85 ha (308.5 acres)

Population (2016)
  - Total: 348
  - Density: 279/km^{2} (722/sq mi)
- Time zone: UTC+8 (BNT)
- Postcode: BH1523

Kampong Batang Perhentian (Malay: Kampung Batang Perhentian) or simply known as Batang Perhentian, is a village in the south-west of Brunei-Muara District, Brunei. The population was 348 in 2016. It is one of the villages within Mukim Pengkalan Batu. The postcode is BH1523.

== Etymology ==
The name Batang Perhentian comes from a large log as a sign where people stop before continuing their journey.

== Demography ==
As of 2014, Kampong Wasan and Batang Perhentian were inhabited by 655 residents consisting of 316 males and 339 females. Most of the people in this village work for the government, in addition to growing rice and gardening themselves. There are a total of 86 houses in this village and most of them belong to the Kedayan tribe. There are 38 elderly people in this village. Although the position of this village is far from the urban area, this village is not exempt from receiving basic facilities as enjoyed in other villages.
