= Kampong Masin =

Masin
- Village
- Kampong Masin
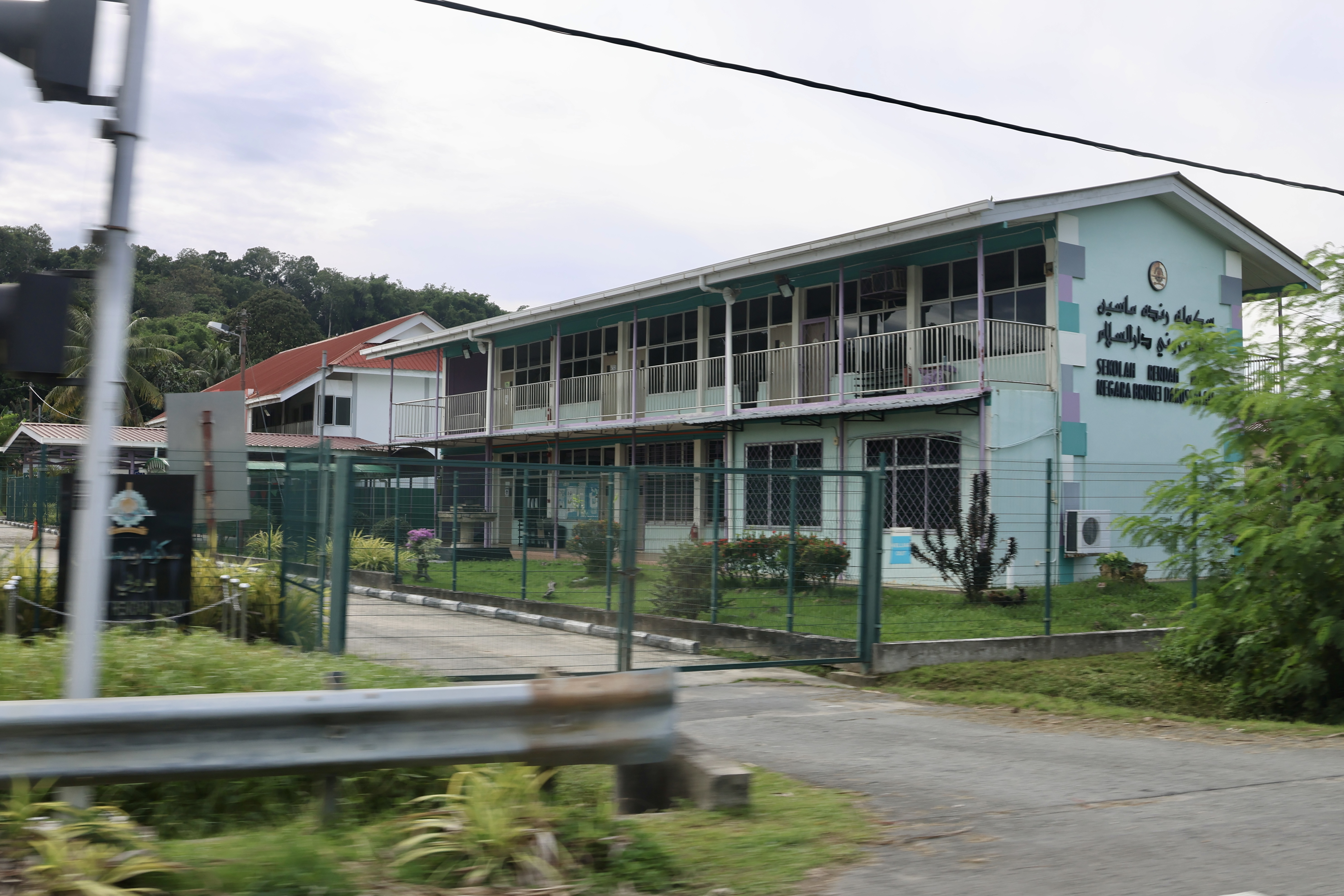
- Masin Primary School

- Location in Brunei
- Coordinates: 4°50′07″N 114°50′40″E
- Country: Brunei
- District: Brunei-Muara
- Mukim: Pengkalan Batu

Government
  - Village head: Moksin Kamis

Population (2016)
  - Total: 2,891
- Time zone: UTC+8 (BNT)
- Postcode: BH2723

Kampong Masin (Malay: Kampung Masin) or simply known as Masin, is a village in Brunei-Muara District, Brunei, about 15.5 kilometres (9.6 mi) from the capital Bandar Seri Begawan. The population was 2,891 in 2016. It is one of the villages within Mukim Pengkalan Batu. The postcode is BH2723.

== Etymology ==
According to folktales, a well was found located on a hill in Simpang 616, Jalan Kecil Masin. The water from the well tastes salty. There is also an area where a rice plantation exist. It is impossible that the well felt salty because it was located on a hill, due to this uniqueness, the name of this village is known as Kampong Masin.

== Geography ==
As a subdivision, Kampong Masin shares boundaries with Kampong Bebatik to the north and north-west, Kampong Kilanas and Kampong Bengkurong to the north-east, Kampong Sinarubai and Kampong Burong Lepas to the east, Kampong Junjongan to the south-east, Kampong Parit to the south and south-east, and Kampong Batong to the west.

== Economy ==
The Ministry of Industry and Primary Resources' Department of Agriculture and Agrifood issued a call for bids in 2011 to create a development master plan for converting the Batampu Agricultural Development Area into high-tech farming with a leasing system. This 480-hectare property, which was split up into 219 two-hectare lots, was underutilized because it was prone to floods. The goal of the research was to develop both immediate and long-term plans for turning the region into a high-tech farm that used progressive and sustainable farming practices.

== Infrastructure ==
The village has access to basic facilities provided by the Government of Brunei such as water supply, electricity supply, telephone and roads.

=== Education ===
- Masin Primary School is the village primary school.
- Masin Religious School is the village school for the country's Islamic religious primary education.
- Masin Secondary School is the secondary school for Mukim Pengkalan Batu.

=== Mosque ===
Kampong Masin Mosque is the village mosque; it was inaugurated by the then Minister of Religious Affairs on 27 December 1987. The mosque can accommodate 500 worshippers.
