= Kampong Sabun =

Village in Brunei

Kampong Sabun کامڤوڠ سابون (Jawi)
- Village
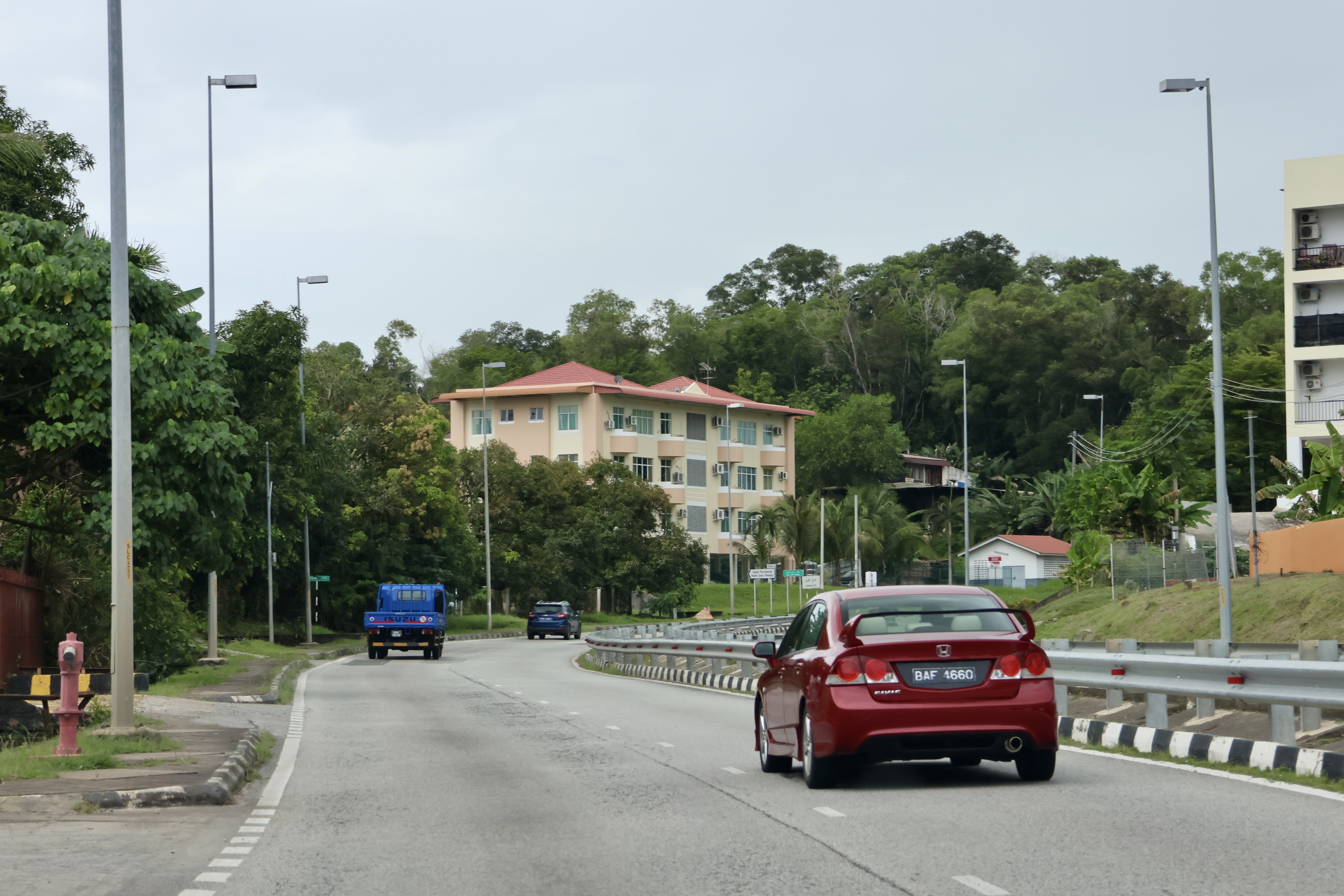
- Jalan Muara in 2024

- Location in Brunei
- Coordinates: 5°01′49″N 115°03′34″E
- Country: Brunei
- District: Brunei-Muara
- Mukim: Serasa

Government
  - Village head: Shahminan Abdul Rahman

Area
  - Total: 134.47 ha (332.3 acres)

Population (2016)
  - Total: 412
  - Density: 306/km^{2} (794/sq mi)
- Time zone: UTC+8 (BNT)
- Postcode: BT2128

Kampong Sabun is a village in Brunei-Muara District, Brunei, near the port town Muara. The population was 412 in 2016. It is one of the villages within Mukim Serasa. The postcode is BT2128.

== Etymology ==
Kampong Sabun took its name from the name of a tree called sabun and whose leaves resemble coconuts.

== Geography ==
The area of Kampong Sabun is 134.47 hectares (332.3 acres). The village has a network of road communication facilities and the use of the Muara and Tutong Highways. It is located about 27 kilometres (17 mi) from the capital Bandar Seri Begawan.

== Demography ==
As of 2015, the total population in Kampong Sabun is 918 people.

== Economy ==
The Majlis Perundingan Kampung (MPK) of Masjid Lama, Pekan Muara, Sabun dan Pelumpong labored and developed a project that was centered on sea fish, specifically the Lumai Fish Snack Project, in an effort to react to the Ministry of Home Affairs' request to actualize the dream of "One Village, One Product". With a gathering of 32 individuals, this activity profited from the collecting of BND10 from community members and villages. The preparation and acquisition of necessary supplies, the acquisition of raw materials, the washing, drying, cooking, packing, and marketing of the Lumai Fish Snack product are all included in the manufacturing phase.

The Muara Leisure Festival's major objective is to increase both locals' and international visitors' familiarity with Old Mosque Village, Pekan Muara, Sabun, and Pelumpong. Additionally, it aims to strengthen friendships and foster an understanding of the spirit of cooperation among MPK members and children. The people of the village work with governmental organizations and private businesses that have an interest in Mukim Serasa in order to carry out economic development activities and assist villagers like orphans and single mothers.
