= Kampong Bebuloh =

- Village
- Location in Brunei
- Coordinates: 4°44′30″N 114°47′20″E
- Country: Brunei
- District: Brunei-Muara
- Mukim: Pengkalan Batu

Government
  - Village head: Firdaus Said

Population (2016)
  - Total: 762
- Time zone: UTC+8 (BNT)
- Postcode: BH3323

Kampong Bebuloh is a village in the south-westernmost part of Brunei-Muara District, Brunei. The population was 762 in 2016. It is one of the villages within Mukim Pengkalan Batu, a mukim in the district.

== Etymology ==
The origin of the name of this village is taken from a large odd tree, found in the middle of the village. The trunk of the tree seems to have thick hair. Therefore, the villagers named this village, Kampong Bebulu. However, due to the fact that the village has a lot of bamboo growing, finally the name of the village officially became Kampung Bebuloh.

== Administration ==
Kampong Paya Karangan, Kampong Durian Suluk and Kampong Tedungan are included in the administration of Kampong Bebuloh.

== Economy ==
A government program called "One Village, One Product" aims to boost local economies, which will then help the whole economy. Such initiatives can both increase the production of local goods on a big scale and serve as a tourist attraction. Weaved items such as baskets, takiding, purses, caps, and bubu are among the goods produced in Kampong Bebuloh. Young and old ladies work on these weavings. This endeavor falls under the umbrella of the Handcraft and Weaving Workshop run by the MPK Economic Bureau.

The main economic result of this village is rice cultivation. The threshed rice will be sold for BND1.60 per kilo. This rice will be sent to the Department of Agriculture to be processed into rice.

The Homestay program in Kampung Bebuloh is one example of a large-scale project that is being worked on by the villagers after the rice planting that was done earlier in support of the wishes of the Sultan through the One Village One Product Program called the 'Program Rumah Inap Desa Kampung Bebuloh'. On 20 December 2012, Pehin Dato Badaruddin Othman officially opened Kampung Bebuloh Village Inn. With a contemporary timber concept design, it was constructed for about BND163,000 by the Brunei and Muara District Department. The Kampung Bebuloh Village Inn, which is 20 kilometers or 45 minutes from Bandar Seri Begawan with a backdrop of enormous rice paddies .

== Demography ==
The village has a population of over 900 people and only 594 people live in there.

== Infrastructure ==
This community has a primary school, a surau, access to power, water, and telephone service, among other public amenities. The Bebuloh Village Consultative Council (MPK) organized a number of different events and initiatives. Cultural workshops and handicraft workshops are two of the events conducted. Under this workshop, the cultural activities of Kampung Bebuloh community are highlighted among them; traditional dances and musicals. This workshop is more of an introduction to the traditions and culture of the Bisaya community in particular. They perform this dance for performances during festivals and so on.

- Bebuloh Primary School — a government primary school
- Balai Ibadat Kampong Bebuloh — the village mosque
