= Pengkalan Batu =

Pengkalan Batu or Pangkalan Batu may refer to:

== Brunei ==
- Kampong Pengkalan Batu, village in Brunei-Muara District
- Mukim Pengkalan Batu, mukim of Brunei-Muara District

== Malaysia ==
- Pengkalan Batu (state constituency), state constituency in Malacca
