= Kampong Mulaut =

Village in Brunei

Mulaut
- Village
- Kampong Mulaut
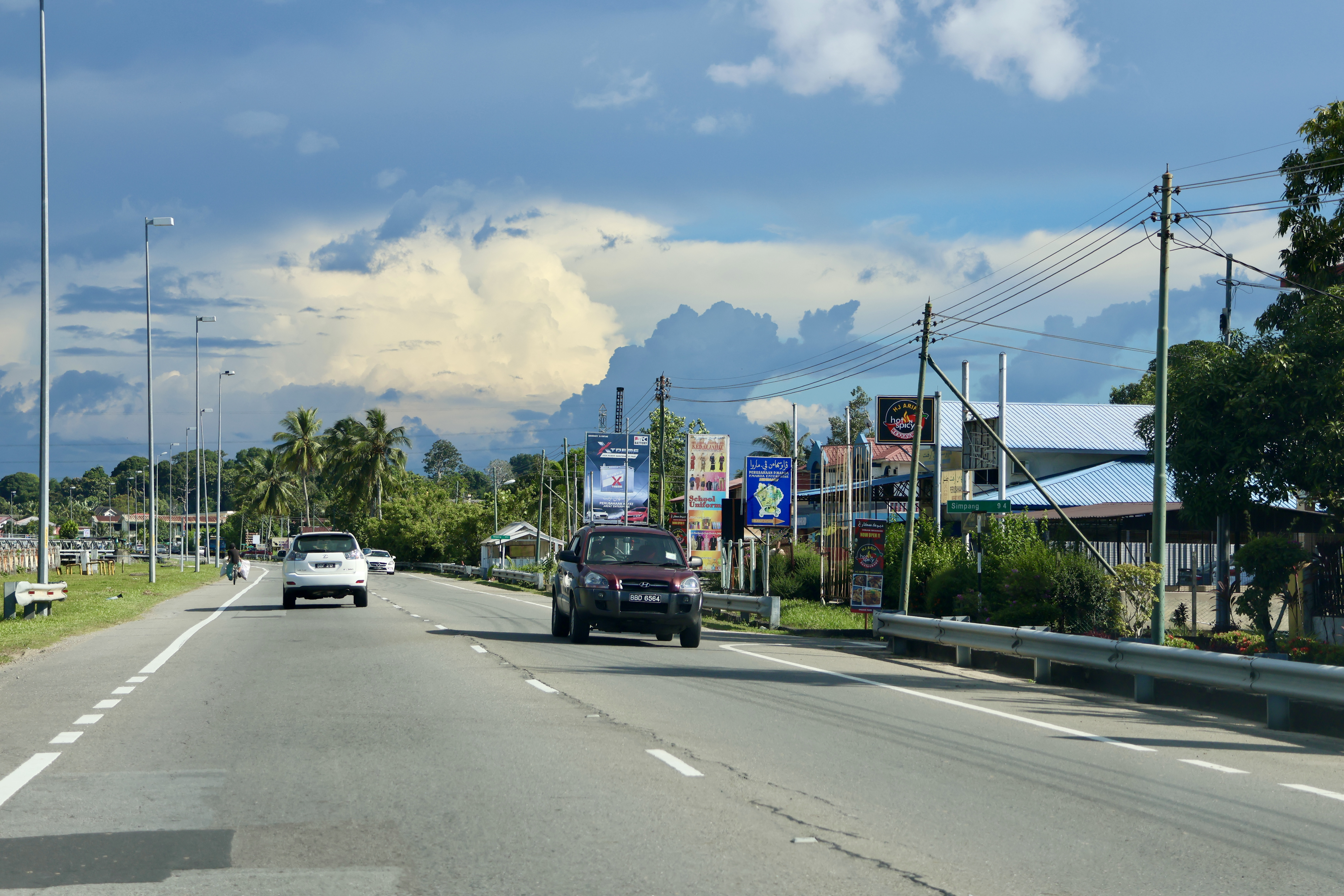
- Jalan Mulaut - Limau Manis

- Location in Brunei
- Coordinates: 4°52′09″N 114°50′48″E
- Country: Brunei
- District: Brunei-Muara
- Mukim: Sengkurong

Government
  - Village head: Hamizan Mustapa

Area
  - Total: 681.03 ha (1,682.9 acres)

Population (2016)
  - Total: 5,846
  - Density: 858.4/km^{2} (2,223/sq mi)
- Time zone: UTC+8 (BNT)
- Postcode: BG2121

Kampong Mulaut is a village in Brunei-Muara District, Brunei, about 14 kilometres (8.7 mi) from the capital Bandar Seri Begawan. The population was 5,846 in 2016. It is one of the villages within Mukim Sengkurong.

== Etymology ==
According to one of the residents of Kampong Mulaut, the earliest school built there was Sekolah Rendah Orang Kaya Setia Bakti. When the Kampong Mulaut area was newly developed with the construction of roads and schools, when a person stood on the hill there and looked towards the flat area below, the person looked as if the flat area under the hill was covered by the sea. Based on the scenery, it was the inspiration to name this village as Kampong Mulaut.

== Demography ==
Most of its working population is working in the public sector while the rest are either running their own business or working in the private sector. In terms of the private enterprise aspect, Kampong Mulaut is host to several small and retail businesses such as cracker making and sugarcane cultivation (gelagah).

== Infrastructure ==
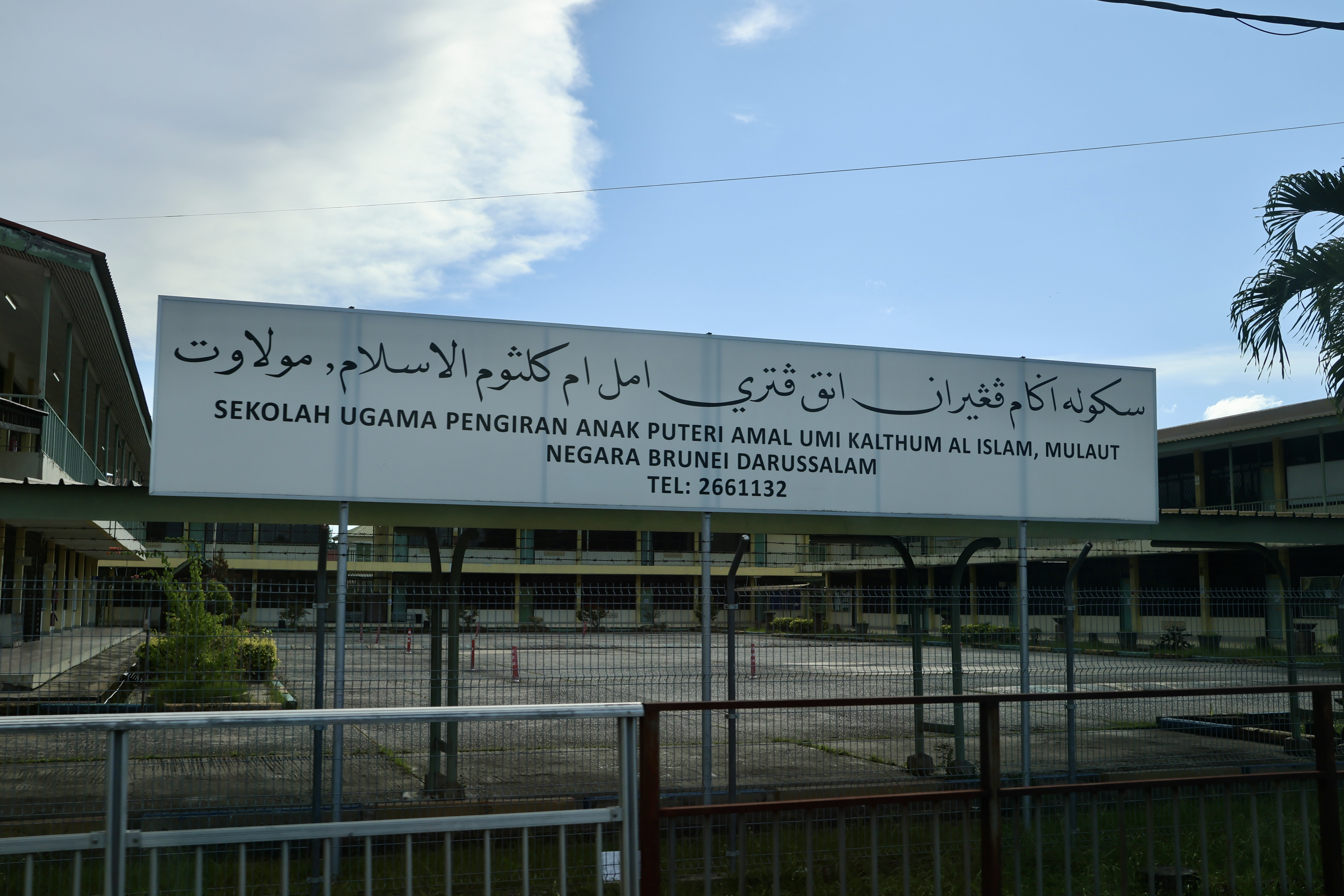
Pengiran Anak Puteri Amal Umi Kalthum Al-Islam Religious School

Mulaut Primary School is the village primary school, whereas Pengiran Anak Puteri Amal Umi Kalthum Al-Islam Religious School is the village school for the country's Islamic religious primary education.

Pengiran Muda Abdul Mateen Mosque is the village mosque.

Kampong Mulaut is also home to Sengkurong Sixth Form Centre, one of the few sixth form colleges in the country.

== Notable people ==
- Haji Awang Mohammad Haji Timbang, award winning script writer
