= Paya Pekan Tutong =

- Village
- Location in Brunei
- Coordinates: 4.7851763°N 114.6917094°E
- Country: Brunei
- District: Tutong
- Mukim: Pekan Tutong
- Postcode: TA3941

Paya Pekan Tutong is a village in Tutong District, Brunei, within the mukim of Pekan Tutong. The postcode for Paya Pekan Tutong is TA3941.
