= Mukim Pengkalan Batu =

- Mukim
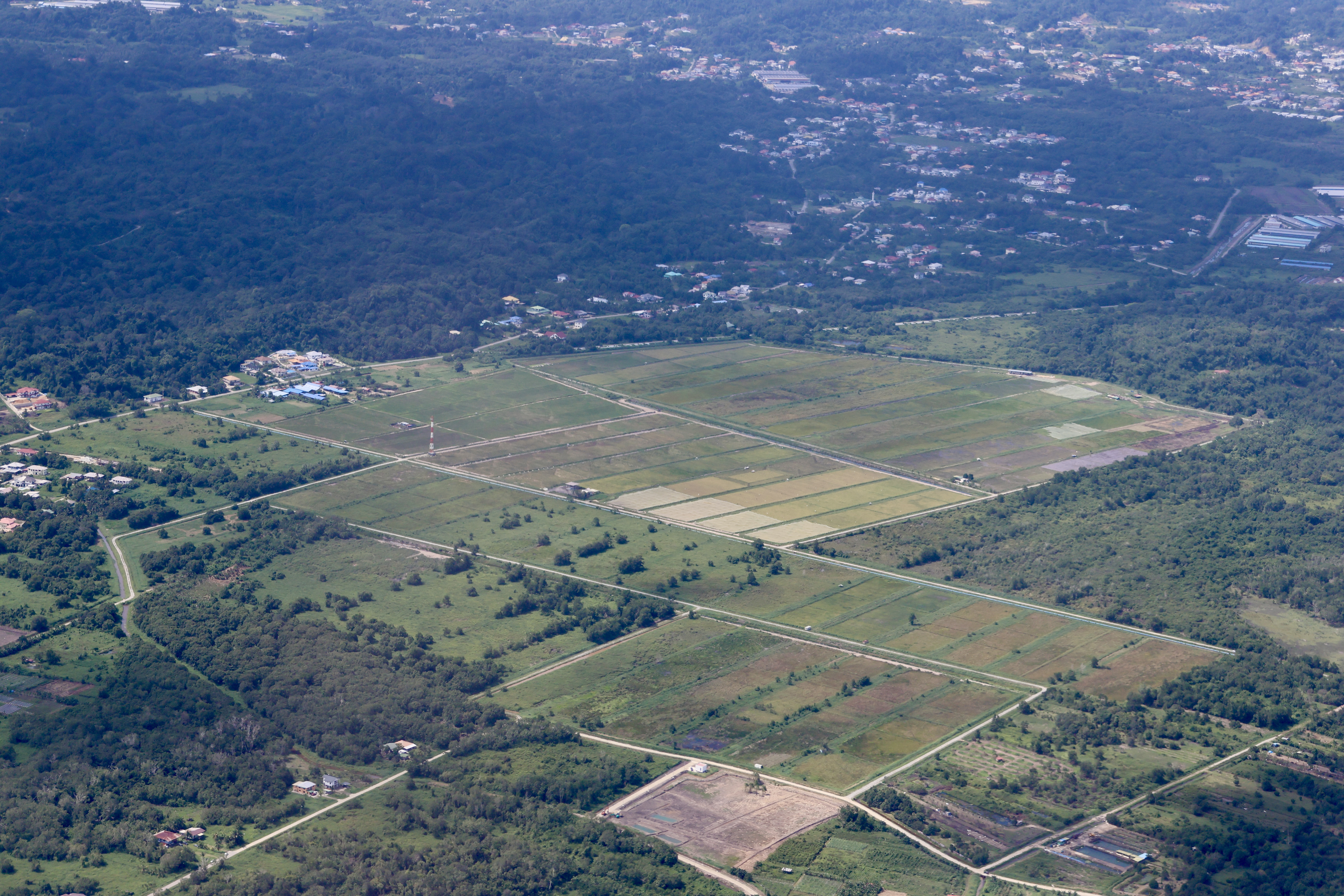
- Agricultural lands in the mukim

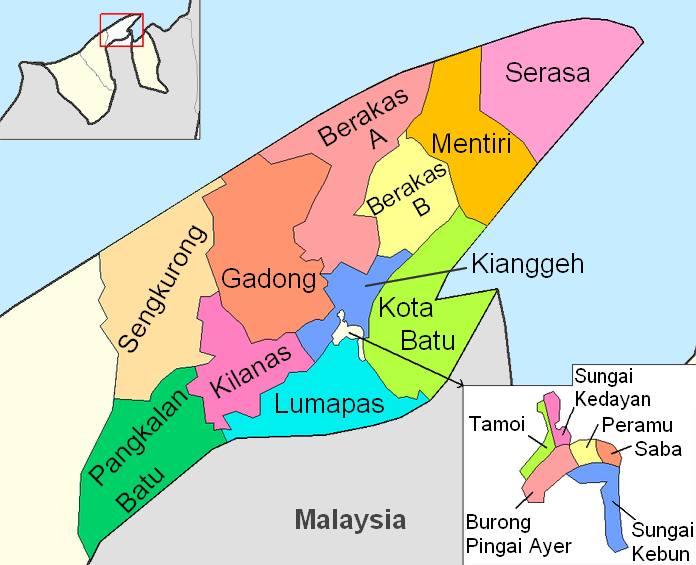
- Pangkalan Batu is in dark green.
- Coordinates: 4.9000°N 114.9000°E
- Country: Brunei
- District: Brunei-Muara

Government
  - Penghulu: Tamam Timbang

Population (2021)
  - Total: 15,860
- Time zone: UTC+8 (BNT)
- Postcode: BHxx23

Mukim Pengkalan Batu (also Mukim Pangkalan Batu) is a mukim in Brunei-Muara District, Brunei. The population was 14,492 in 2016.

== Geography ==
The mukim is the southernmost mukim in the district, bordering Mukim Sengkurong to the north, Mukim Kilanas and Mukim Lumapas to the north-east, and Mukim Kiudang and Mukim Keriam in Tutong District to the south-west and north-west respectively. It also borders Limbang District in Sarawak, Malaysia to the east and south.

== Demographics ==
As of 2016 census, the population of Mukim Pengkalan Batu comprised 7,435 males and 7,057 females. The mukim had 2,288 households occupying 2,259 dwellings. The entire population lived in rural areas.

== Administration ==
As of 2021, the mukim encompasses the following populated villages:

Settlements	Population (2021)	Ketua kampung (2024)
Kampong Bebatik	1,726	—N/a
Kampong Masin	3,129	Moksin bin Haji Kamis
Kampong Parit	1,310	—N/a
Kampong Pengkalan Batu	907	Muhammad Haikal bin Haji Kahar
Kampong Batu Ampar	799	—N/a
Kampong Batong	1,319	Haji Saban bin Lamat
Kampong Panchor Murai	533	Haji Ismail bin Haji Jumat
Kampong Wasan	441	Haji Ismail bin Haji Jumat
Kampong Batang Perhentian	346	—N/a
Kampong Limau Manis	1,155	Mohaimin bin Haji Johari @ Jahari
Kampong Kuala Lurah	763	—N/a
Kampong Junjongan	2,622	Haji Tamam @ Haji Ahmad Shah Tamami bin Haji Timbang
Kampong Bebuloh	687	Muhammad Firdaus bin Haji Said @ Shamrey bin Lantang
Kampong Imang	123	—N/a
