= Kampong Batu Ampar =

- Village
- Location in Brunei
- Coordinates: 4°46′56″N 114°49′18″E
- Country: Brunei
- District: Brunei-Muara
- Mukim: Pengkalan Batu

Population (2016)
  - Total: 629
- Time zone: UTC+8 (BNT)
- Postcode: BH1323

Kampong Batu Ampar is a village in the south-west of Brunei-Muara District, Brunei. The population was 629 in 2016. It is one of the villages within Mukim Pengkalan Batu. The postcode is BH1323.
