= Lugu =

Lugu may refer to:

- Kampong Lugu, settlement in Brunei-Muara District, Brunei
- Lugu, Nantou, township in Nantou County, Taiwan
- Lugu, Tibet, village in the Tibet Autonomous Region of China
- Lugu Lake, on the border of Sichuan and Yunnan provinces, China
