= Kampong Bebatik =

- Village
- Location in Brunei
- Coordinates: 4°51′07″N 114°50′25″E
- Country: Brunei
- District: Brunei-Muara
- Mukim: Pengkalan Batu

Population (2016)
  - Total: 1,409
- Time zone: UTC+8 (BNT)
- Postcode: BH3223

Kampong Bebatik is a village in Brunei-Muara District, Brunei. The population was 1,409 in 2016. It is one of the villages within Mukim Pengkalan Batu. The postcode is BH3223.
