= Kampong Junjongan =

Village in Brunei

Junjongan
- Village
- Kampong Junjongan
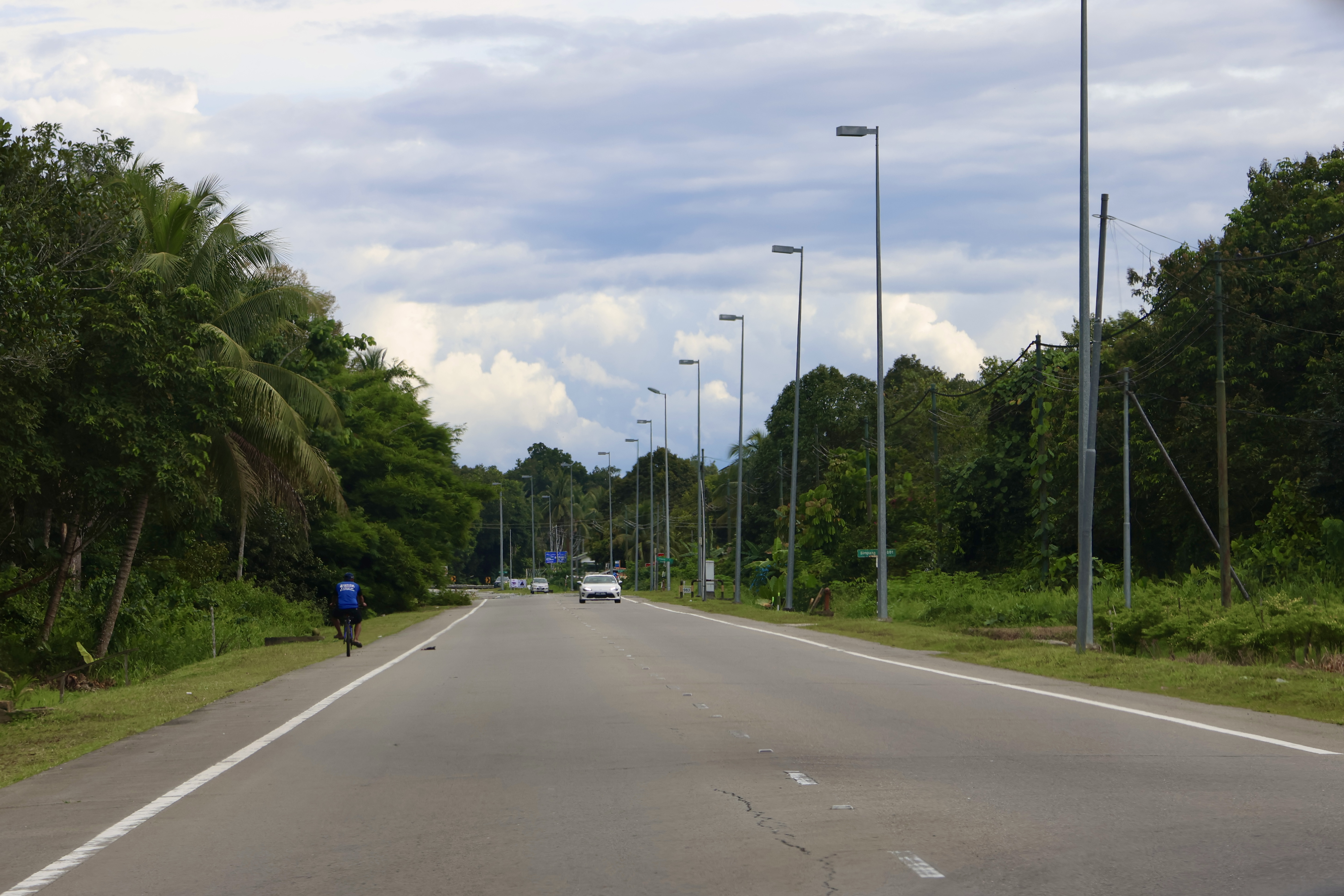
- Jalan Junjongan

- Location in Brunei
- Coordinates: 4°48′37″N 114°51′14″E
- Country: Brunei
- District: Brunei-Muara
- Mukim: Pengkalan Batu

Government
  - Village head: Tamam Timbang

Population (2016)
  - Total: 2,006
- Time zone: UTC+8 (BNT)
- Postcode: BH2123

Kampong Junjongan (Malay: Kampung Junjongan) also Kampong Junjungan or simply Junjongan, is a village in the south-east of Brunei–Muara District, Brunei, about 16 kilometres (9.9 mi) from the capital of Brunei, Bandar Seri Begawan. According to 2016 records, the population was 2,006. It is one of the villages within Mukim Pengkalan Batu. The postcode is BH2123.

== Etymology ==
The village was originally called Kampong Lampaki. Lampaki is a type of bamboo. Later, the name of this village was changed to Kampong Junjongan because in the past it was often visited and became the focus of traders. According to folktales, these people move from town to village to earn a living. At that time, the barter system was still practiced; salted fish is exchanged for fruits. In addition, the name of this village is taken in conjunction with the good quarter from the words disanpat, dijungung which means to be looked up to and respected.

== History ==
Around the 1930s, this village was only inhabited by approximately 30 people with only 13 houses built. At that time, the spirit of cooperation was very strong among the villagers.

== Economy ==
=== Agriculture ===
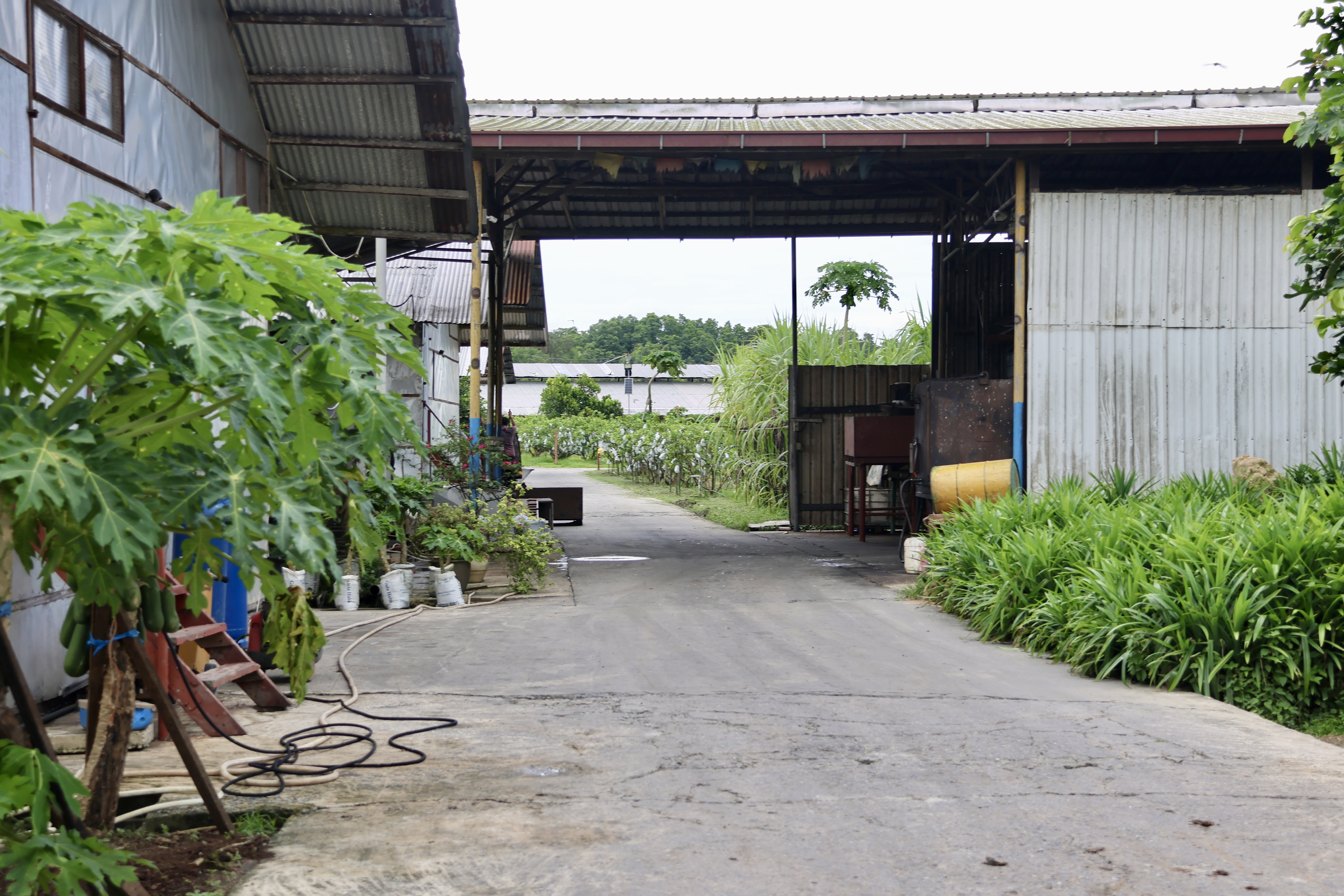
Hua Ho Agricultural Farm

The villagers worked on a coconut plantation scheme that started in 1975. At this time, a total of 63 people were given one lot each which is two acres of land each to be developed for the plant scheme. Whereas in 2000, Koperasi BAKA was established until now working on a local fruit farm planted on 73 hectares of land by 128 members of the village. With the fertile soil, this village also farms local fruits such as durian, rambutan, pulasan, kembayau, binjai and belunu. The Tar Handicraft Entrepreneur (Hadrah) can be classified as percussion music which only uses drums and gongs to accompany the singing during cultural events such as weddings, welcoming guests and so on.

Lau Ah Kok founded the Hua Ho Agricultural Farm in 1947. Beginning in September 2000, the farm began to spread into Belait District's Rampayoh region and other agricultural development areas in the Brunei–Muara District, including Batumpu, Sungai Tajau, and Junjungan. The farm provides fruits, vegetables, hens, and eggs as of April 2020. Since 2000, Lau How Teck has raised agricultural productivity, output, and sales by utilising innovative technologies. 2013 saw 117 metric tons of fruits and vegetables grown on the farm. It was generating over 129 metric tons by 2017. The Department of Agriculture and Agrifood (DoAA) awarded the Brunei Darussalam GAP (Good Agricultural Practice) seal to Hua Ho Agricultural Farm and Kampong Masin's Ladang Tunas Harapan, both of which are managed by Lau, on 15 April 2014.

== Infrastructure ==
Junjongan Primary School is the village primary school. It also shares grounds with Junjongan Religious School, the village school for the country's Islamic religious primary education.

Kampong Junjongan Mosque was completed on 15 September 1998 on a 1.5-acre land site with an expenditure of BND$60,000. The capacity of this mosque can accommodate a total of 250 pilgrims. Among other facilities provided include water supply, electricity and schools..

Makam Sharif Alwi (Tomb of Sharif Alwi) is located near the river. According to oral history, Sharif traveled to spread Islam in the villages, he had a fight with Datu Rumbi, an invincible man. The fight took place in Kampong Masin and ultimately resulted in Sharif Alwi being killed and his body washed up in the Limau Manis River. He was given the title 'Raja Junjungan' for his sacrifice. The site of this tomb can still be seen as the remains of historical evidence that is also written in the Tersilah Brunei book as a reference.
