= Kampong Katimahar =

- Village
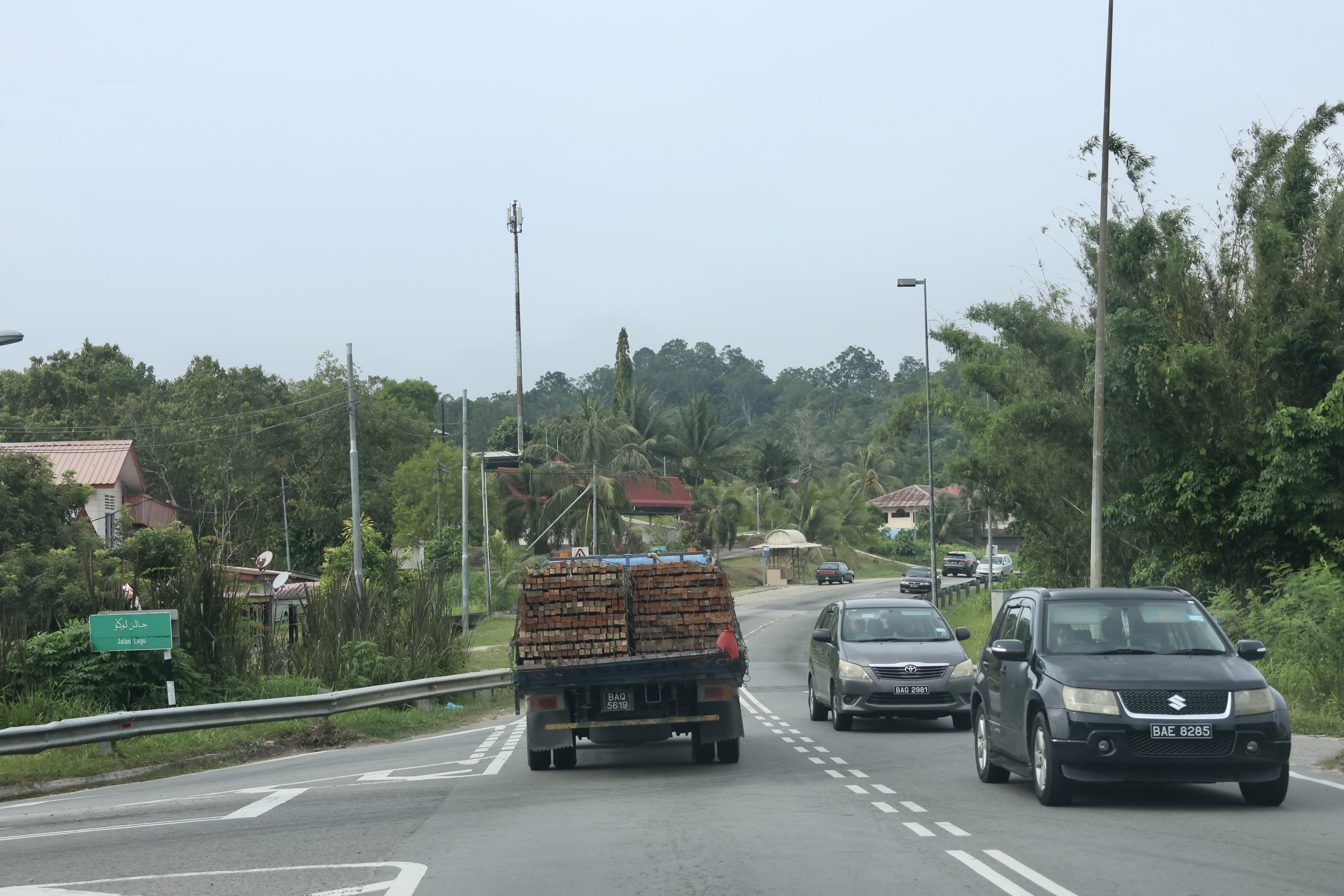

- Location in Brunei
- Coordinates: 4°52′07″N 114°48′48″E
- Country: Brunei
- District: Brunei-Muara
- Mukim: Sengkurong

Government
  - Village head: Bujang Abdul Ghani

Population (2016)
  - Total: 873
- Time zone: UTC+8 (BNT)
- Postcode: BG2721

Kampong Katimahar is a village in Brunei-Muara District, Brunei, about 20 kilometres (12 mi) from the capital Bandar Seri Begawan. The population was 873 in 2016. It is one of the villages within Mukim Sengkurong. The postcode is BG2721.

== Economy ==
Taman Agri Katimahar is currently fully funded by Soto Rindu Restaurant. Originally, in 2010, the fruit trees that were planted were only an area of 10 acres with a workforce of 15 people, but now Taman Agri Katimahar is cultivated by 158 entrepreneurs consisting of residents of Kampong Katimahar with a land area of more than 100 acres. According to the Ketua Kampong Lugu and Katimahar, Awang Salim bin Adi, the construction of the park is to support the government's call, which is One Village, One Product. In addition, the objective of this park is to provide job opportunities to job seekers, especially to the young generation and village residents.

With the soil conditions suitable for cultivation, several types of local fruits are cultivated in this park. According to Agri Park Manager, Awang Haji Zainal bin Safar, among the plants in this park are 5,000 durian trees, 2,000 tibadak fruit trees and 2,000 tarap fruit trees. This includes local fruits that are almost extinct such as meritus, nenggalau, kalak, dadaran and mata kucing. In addition, there are also rambutan, longan, mambangan, santol, sukang, salat durian, starfruit, belunu and binjai. In addition, five acres of native herbs are also available in this park.

Several farms of wild animals kept by private breeders are also found here, including more than 200 buffaloes and several crocodiles. In addition to the animals kept, there are also more than 5,000 storks that are often seen in this park either in the morning, afternoon or night. The park also houses 50 freshwater fresh fish ponds, included fishes like catfish.

== Infrastructure ==
Awang Haji Mohd Yusof Primary School is the village primary school, whereas Katimahar Religious School is the village school for the country's Islamic religious primary education.

Paduka Seri Begawan Sultan Omar Ali Saifuddien Mosque is the village mosque.
