= Kampong Wasan =

Wasan
- Village
- Kampong Wasan
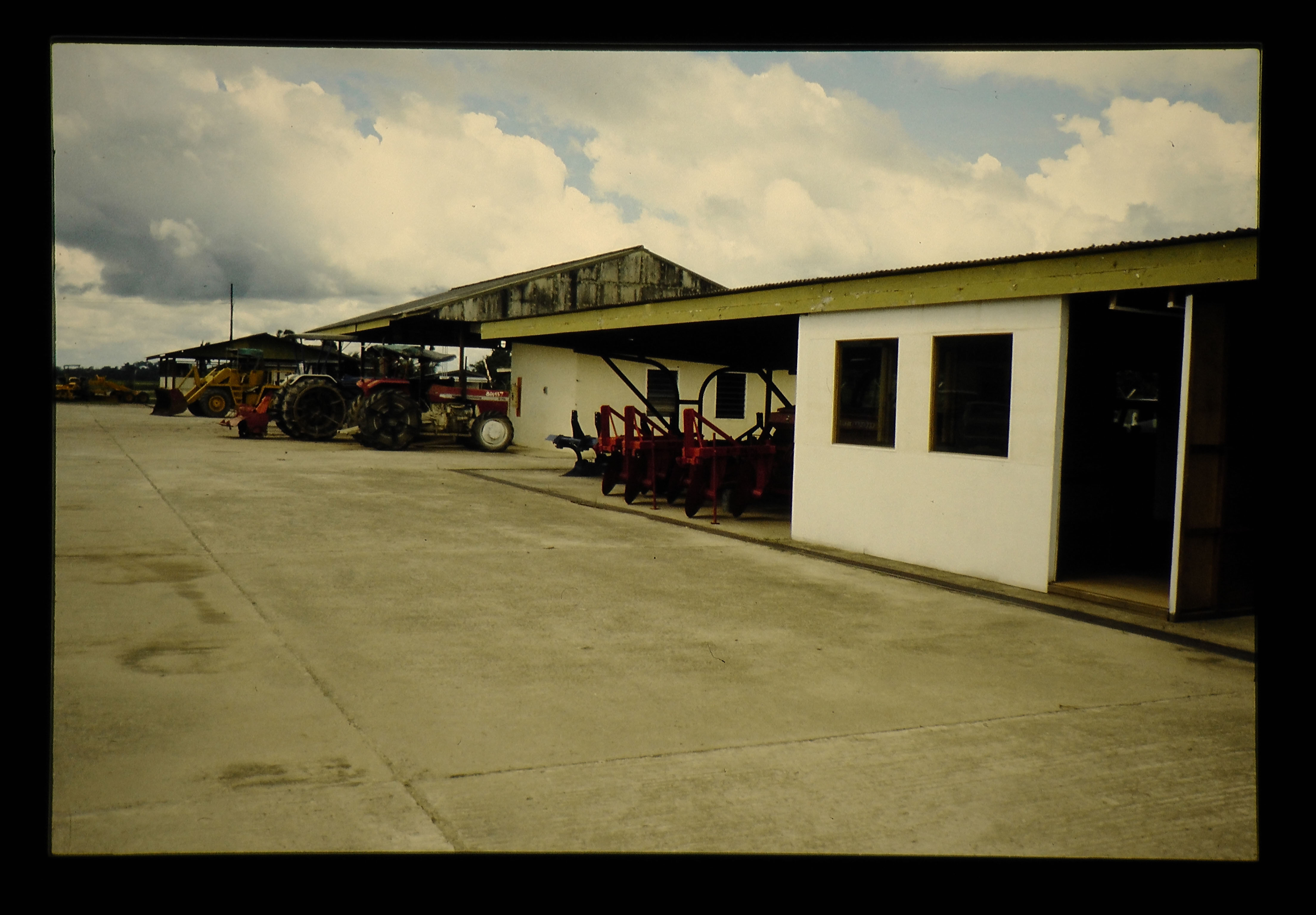
- Wasan Rice Project in 1989

- Location in Brunei
- Coordinates: 4°46′07″N 114°47′48″E
- Country: Brunei
- District: Brunei-Muara
- Mukim: Pengkalan Batu

Government
  - Village head: Ismail Jumat

Area
  - Total: 939.76 ha (2,322.2 acres)

Population (2016)
  - Total: 482
  - Density: 51.3/km^{2} (133/sq mi)
- Time zone: UTC+8 (BNT)
- Postcode: BH2523

Kampong Wasan (Malay: Kampung Wasan) or simply known as Wasan, is a village in the south-west of Brunei-Muara District, Brunei. The population was 482 in 2016. It is one of the villages within Mukim Pengkalan Batu. The postcode is BH2523.

== Etymology ==
The name of Kampong Wasan comes from a hill called Bukit Wasan (Wasan Hill) which was used as a stop before continuing the journey.

== Demography ==
As of 2014, Kampong Wasan and Batang Perhentian were inhabited by 655 residents consisting of 316 males and 339 females. Most of the people in this village work for the government, in addition to growing rice and gardening themselves. There are a total of 86 houses in this village and most of them belong to the Kedayan tribe. There are 38 elderly people in this village. Although the position of this village is far from the urban area, this village is not exempt from receiving basic facilities as enjoyed in other villages.

One of the customs that is still practiced in this village is Adat Berbasuh Kaki. According to him, most of the people in this village are related to the people of Tutong District, so for this reason, this custom is also used in this village and used if there is agreement from both sides of the bride's family.

== Economy ==
In accordance with the geographical conditions and the structure of the land, Wasan is a place where the government works to grow rice. Among the rice grown are Padi Laila, Pusu, Bario and Adan. In addition to growing rice, some residents of this village also own land that they cultivate for their own gardening by growing local fruits.
