= Districts of Brunei =

First-level administrative divisions of Brunei

Districts (Malay: daerah) are the first-level administrative divisions of Brunei. The country is divided into four districts, namely Brunei–Muara, Belait, Tutong, and Temburong. Temburong is an exclave; it is physically separated from the three other districts by the Brunei Bay and the Malaysian state of Sarawak. Each district has a town as its administrative and economic centre, with the exception of Brunei–Muara, where the centre is Bandar Seri Begawan, a city and the country's capital.

== History ==
The country previously had six districts, namely Brunei, Muara, Limau Manis (also known as Ulu Brunei), Tutong, Belait, and Temburong. Brunei and Limau Manis were merged in 1908, and the districts were restructured to form the present-day four districts in 1938.

== Administration ==
Each district is administered by a district office (jabatan daerah), which is a government department under the Ministry of Home Affairs. The head of each department is a district officer (pegawai daerah) who is appointed by the government.

A district is further divided into mukims (townships), and subsequently each mukim consists of several villages (kampung). Each district office manages the mukims and villages within its district.

== Districts ==
The four districts of Brunei are Brunei–Muara, Belait, Tutong, and Temburong. Temburong is an exclave of Brunei, separated by the Brunei Bay and the Malaysian state of Sarawak. Brunei–Muara is the smallest district by area but the largest by population, as it contains the national capital, Bandar Seri Begawan.

District	Capital	Population (2016 census)	Area (km^{2})	Area (sq mi)	Population density (km^{2})	No. of mukims
Brunei-Muara	Bandar Seri Begawan (also the capital of Brunei)	289,630	571	220	507	18
Belait	Kuala Belait	69,062	2,727	1,053	25	8
Tutong	Pekan Tutong	48,313	1,166	450	41	8
Temburong	Pekan Bangar	10,251	1,306	504	8	5

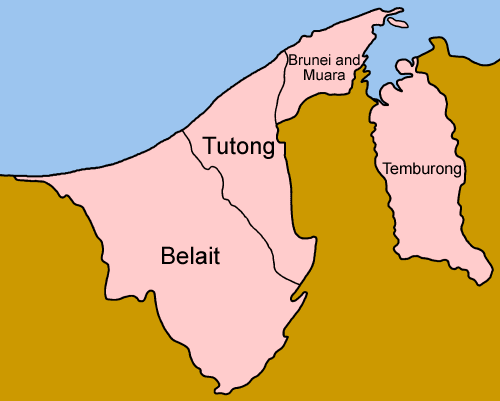
The four districts of Brunei

== See also ==
- ISO 3166-2:BN
