= Time in Brunei =

Time in Brunei Darussalam
- Time zone

UTC offset
- SST: UTC+08:00

Current time
- 06:42, 24 March 2025 SST [refresh]

Observance of DST
- DST is not observed in this time zone.

Time in Brunei Darussalam is given by Brunei Darussalam Time (BNT), which is UTC+08:00. Brunei Darussalam 'standard time' does not currently observe daylight saving time (DST).
