= Mukims of Brunei =

Second-level administrative division of Brunei

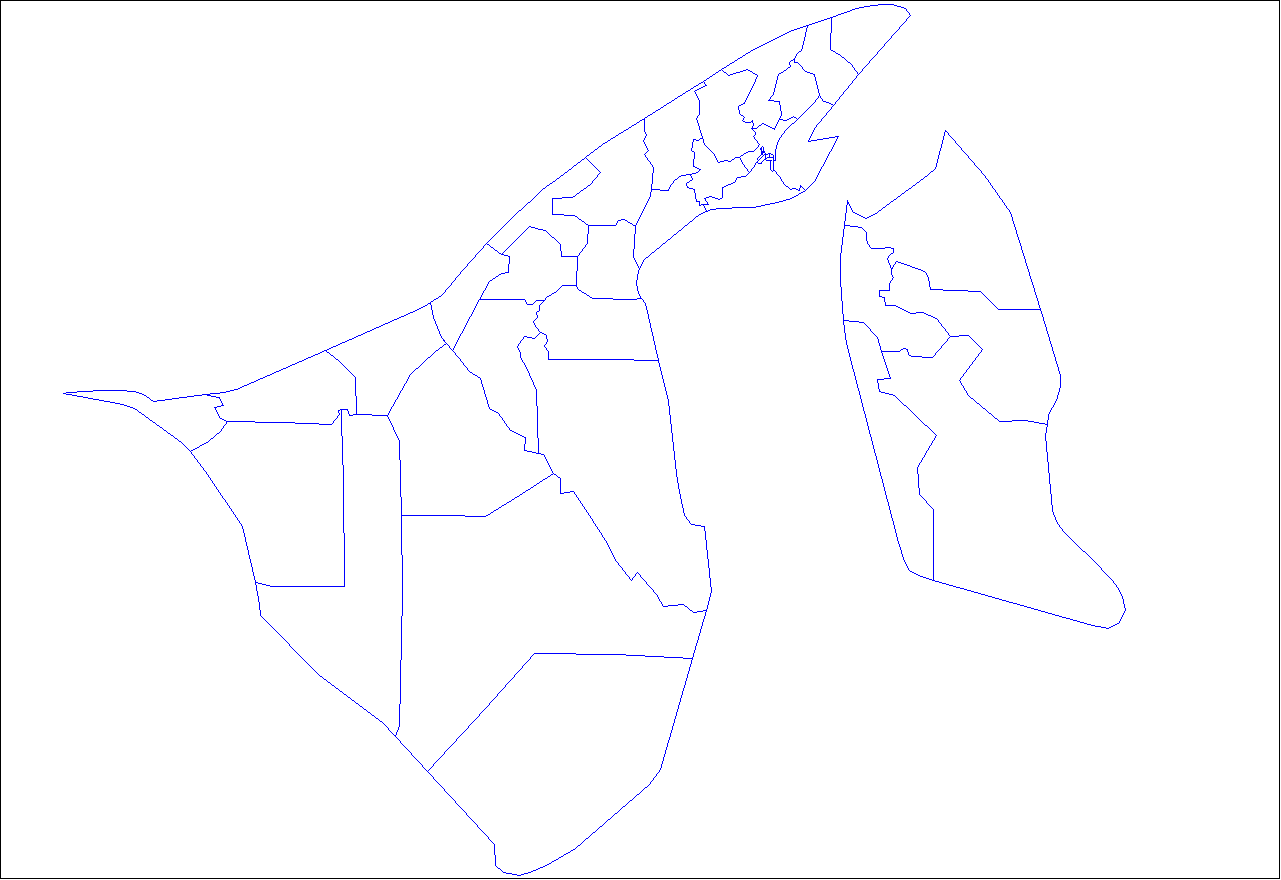
Mukims of Brunei.

A mukim is a second-level administrative division of Brunei Darussalam, and the primary sub-division of a larger district (daerah). There are thirty-nine mukims within the four districts of the sultanate Brunei Darussalam. A mukim is led by a penghulu, since 2015 elected by democratic vote. A mukim encompasses a number of villages, known in Malay as kampung or kampong. Mukims are administered by the district office of the district where they are located.

== List of mukims ==
Mukims of Brunei Darussalam
Mukim	District	Population (2021)	map
Berakas 'A'	Brunei-Muara	28,311	(note that Gadong 'A' and 'B' are shown as one entity)
Berakas 'B'	Brunei-Muara	39,284	(note that Gadong 'A' and 'B' are shown as one entity)
Burong Pingai Ayer	Brunei-Muara	1,459	(note that Gadong 'A' and 'B' are shown as one entity)
Gadong 'A'	Brunei-Muara	35,424	(note that Gadong 'A' and 'B' are shown as one entity)
Gadong 'B'	Brunei-Muara	38,067	(note that Gadong 'A' and 'B' are shown as one entity)
Kianggeh	Brunei-Muara	8,102	(note that Gadong 'A' and 'B' are shown as one entity)
Kilanas	Brunei-Muara	24,981	(note that Gadong 'A' and 'B' are shown as one entity)
Kota Batu	Brunei-Muara	12,676	(note that Gadong 'A' and 'B' are shown as one entity)
Lumapas	Brunei-Muara	8,058	(note that Gadong 'A' and 'B' are shown as one entity)
Mentiri	Brunei-Muara	39,324	(note that Gadong 'A' and 'B' are shown as one entity)
Pangkalan Batu	Brunei-Muara	15,860	(note that Gadong 'A' and 'B' are shown as one entity)
Peramu	Brunei-Muara	1,151	(note that Gadong 'A' and 'B' are shown as one entity)
Saba	Brunei-Muara	827	(note that Gadong 'A' and 'B' are shown as one entity)
Sengkurong	Brunei-Muara	40,972	(note that Gadong 'A' and 'B' are shown as one entity)
Serasa	Brunei-Muara	18,569	(note that Gadong 'A' and 'B' are shown as one entity)
Sungai Kebun	Brunei-Muara	4,282	(note that Gadong 'A' and 'B' are shown as one entity)
Sungai Kedayan	Brunei-Muara	241	(note that Gadong 'A' and 'B' are shown as one entity)
Tamoi	Brunei-Muara	942	(note that Gadong 'A' and 'B' are shown as one entity)
Bukit Sawat	Belait	759	
Kuala Balai	Belait	16	
Kuala Belait	Belait	28,793	
Labi	Belait	727	
Liang	Belait	16,813	
Melilas	Belait	29	
Seria	Belait	18,313	
Sukang	Belait	81	
Keriam	Tutong	8,589	
Kiudang	Tutong	5,063	
Lamunin	Tutong	3,641	
Pekan Tutong	Tutong	9,883	
Rambai	Tutong	980	
Tanjong Maya	Tutong	3,772	
Telisai	Tutong	13,253	
Ukong	Tutong	2,029	
Amo	Temburong	1,667	
Bangar	Temburong	2,112	
Batu Apoi	Temburong	1,355	
Bokok	Temburong	3,812	
Labu	Temburong	508	
