= Villages of Brunei =

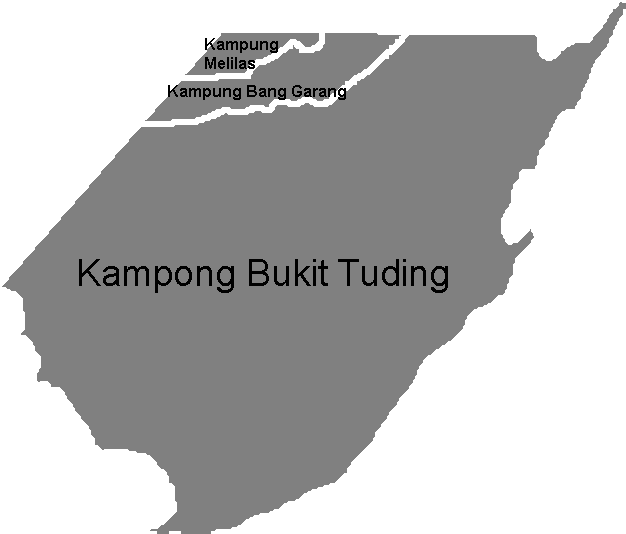
Villages in Mukim of Melilas

A village (Malay: kampung or kampong) is the third and lowest administrative division of Brunei. It is headed by a village head (ketua kampung). Several villages are grouped together to form a mukim. A village is generally the traditional rural settlement, in particular in the sense of a kampong or Malay traditional village, but it may also be an urbanised settlement within or near the capital city or a town, or part of the public housing estates. The population varies from hundreds to a few thousands.

== Administration ==
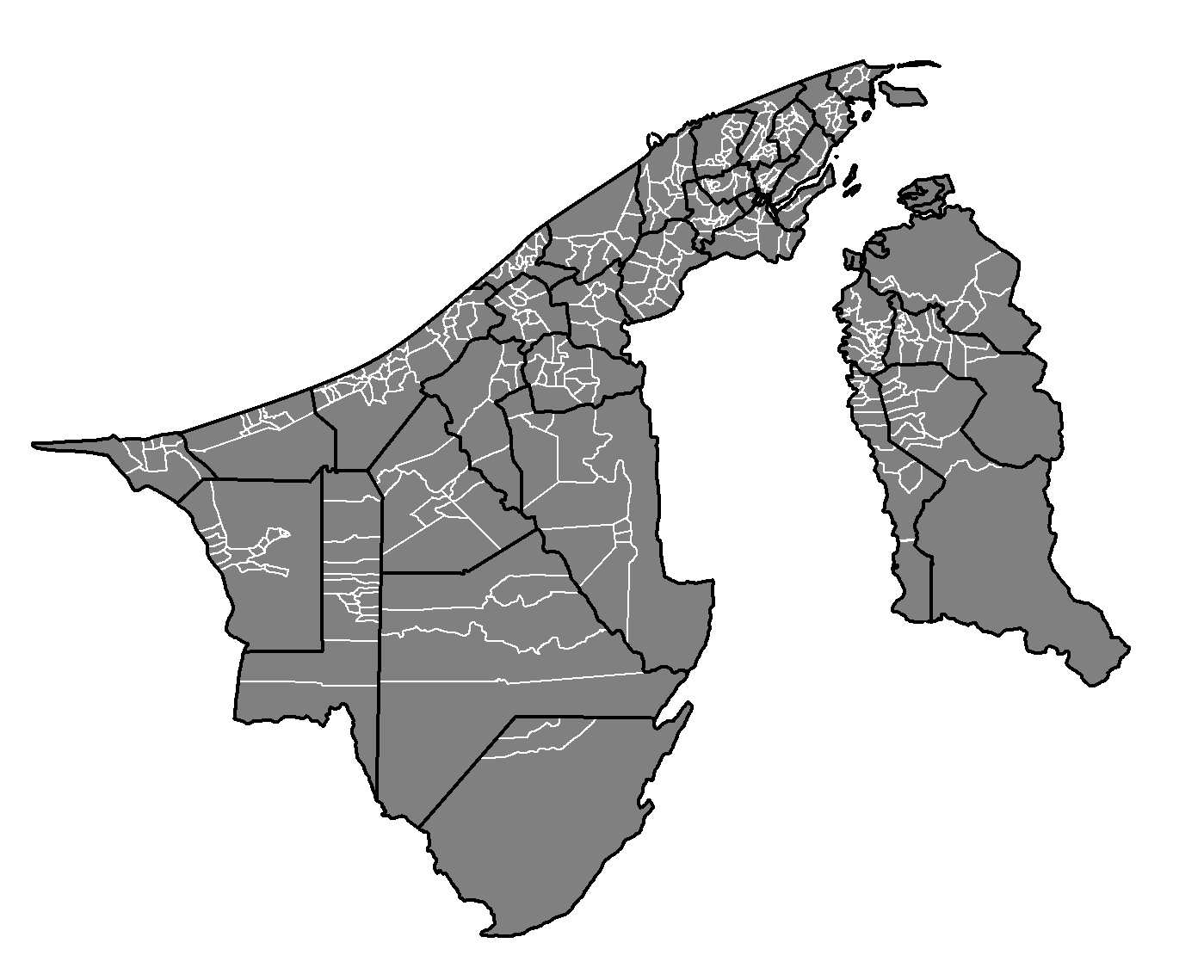
Brunei Administrative Divisions

Villages are administered under the district office of the district where they belong.

A village is headed by a village head (ketua kampung). It is an elected position, whereby the populace nominates candidates to the district office and votes among the approved nominees. The nominee may be of an age between 30 and 55 years old. The elected person shall be in office for up to ten years.

A village may also have a Village Consultative Council (Majlis Perundingan Kampung), the local equivalent of community association. A key outcome of the council is One Village One Product (Satu Kampung Satu Produk, abbreviated as "1K1P"), which promotes local goods produced in the village.

It was stated on 13 October 1976, that the four districts of Brunei had come up with a plan wherein signboards listing the names of the villages would be placed in each kampong. At the edges of each village, the boards will be erected. There are already signboards in place at almost every village in the districts of Brunei-Muara, Belait, and around 50 in Tutong.

== Characteristics ==
A typical Bruneian village may have basic socio-economic infrastructures which are similar to other villages elsewhere but may also be unique to Brunei or countries which have predominantly Islamic Malay culture. For communal purposes, there may be a balai raya or dewan kemasyarakatan, the local equivalent of a community centre. A Bruneian village typically has a primary school. Because the majority of Brunei's population is Muslims, many villages have mosques, particularly serving the need of Jumu'ah or congregational Friday prayers, as well as a religious primary school for its resident Muslim pupils. There are also at least a grocery store present in many villages, as well as a few other miscellaneous shops such as eateries, tailors, and barbers or salons.

=== Variation ===
A village may have population ranging from hundreds to less than ten thousand people. Also, not all of the socio-economic amenities are present in every village. Some villages do not have primary and/or religious primary school – prospective resident pupils go to the schools in nearby villages. Some village subdivisions are simply designated public housing areas but having the population size comparable to a village. Other villages, especially in the more urban areas, may be large enough to function socio-economically as towns but without any municipal body. Several villages may also be part of municipal areas of Bandar Seri Begawan and other district towns, thus the populaces may also be subjected under the jurisdiction of respective municipal departments.

== Kampong Ayer ==
Even though Kampong Ayer has the term 'kampong' in its name, it is not officially a village subdivision. In fact, Kampong Ayer is made up of several villages constituting a few subdistricts.

== See also ==
- List of villages in Brunei
