= Diplomatic Enclave =

Diplomatic Enclave may also refer to:

- Chanakyapuri, diplomatic enclave of New Delhi, India
- Dwarka, Delhi, diplomatic enclave of New Delhi, India
- Diplomatic Enclave, Islamabad
- Diplomatic Enclave, Brunei
