= The Brunei Times =

English-language newspaper published from 2006 to 2016

- Type: Daily newspaper
- Format: compact
- Founded: 1 July 2006; 20 years ago
- Ceased publication: 8 November 2016; 9 years ago
- Political alignment: Independent

The Brunei Times was an independent English-language daily compact broadsheet newspaper published in Brunei Darussalam from 2006 to 2016. It was owned by Brunei Times PLC.

== History ==
The paper was introduced at a soft launch on 1 July 2006; 20 years ago, at The Mall, Gadong, Brunei Darussalam, and carried the motto 'Fresh Ideas, New Option, Global Vision'. Pehin Adanan Yusof officially launched the paper, emphasising the need of a newspaper in maintaining the Sultanate's peace and security. The new daily, which was available online, aimed to give residents with an extra source of information, and to play a beneficial part in the nation-building process, according to Ahmad Morshidi (Managing Director). It was offered on a complimentary basis until 16 July 2006. The paper went to print in their new printing plant in Junjungan while moving away from its original broadsheet format to a newer compact broadsheet on 28 March 2007.

April 2007 saw The Brunei Times working closely with the Ministry of Communication on the United Nations (UN) First Global Road Safety Week Seminar, which was held in the International Convention Centre in Berakas, Brunei. In May, The Brunei Times was nominated to be the official media for Brunei Darussalam International Defence Exhibition (BRIDEX) organised by the Ministry of Defence (MinDef) that was held at the International Convention Centre from 31 May to 2 June.

July saw the two major milestones achieved by The Brunei Times. The first was The Brunei Times' one year anniversary: The Brunei Times change its masthead to reflect its new corporate image, and the paper itself went through a redesign to respond to market forces and changes, adding four pages to its content to cater to increasing demand for more local home news. The second milestone was the launch of The Brunei Times Newspaper in Education Programme (BT-NIE); working with two corporate sponsors in the country, 400 copies of The Brunei Times were sent daily to thirty-one secondary schools across Brunei Darussalam. This figure was expected to rise as more and more schools, both private and government, respond to the BT-NIE Programme.

On 1 July 2010, The Brunei Times changed its format to compact size to coincide with its 4th anniversary of the newspaper, in which the newspaper had 48 pages. The Brunei Times was a member of Asia News Network (ANN).

=== Closure ===
On 6 November 2016, the newspaper announced in its Sunday masthead that it will cease operations on 8 November, citing "issues relating to business sustainability, especially in the face of considerable challenges from the alternative media". The closure however, was looked upon with suspicion, due to its abrupt nature without even being addressed on its social media channels. Other investigative sources claim the closure was rooted by complaints from the Saudi embassy to the Sultan of Brunei upon a news report regarding a hike in visa fees for Bruneian pilgrims to Mecca.

The paper was well-known to test the tight boundaries of local press freedom. The official reasons given by the newspaper were "business issues", "challenges from the alternative media", and problems with "reporting and journalistic standards that should meet the mark set". The paper expressed gratitude to the government "for bearing with us", and for "having continued to extend the license to publish despite all the issues". More than 100 staff members lost their jobs.

== Contents ==
The Brunei Times focused on news analysis, features, commentaries, and op-ed articles on local and foreign happenings. Business and finance also formed its mainstay.

On weekdays, the newspaper was published in two sections of twenty-four pages each. Prior to July 2010, there were twelve pages in each section.

The Brunei Times staff consisted of experienced and dedicated editors from Brunei as well as abroad working alongside local reporters.

== See also ==
- Media of Brunei
