= Pusar Ulak =

Pusar Ulak Kampung Pusar Ulak
- Neighbourhood and village
- Kampong Pusar Ulak
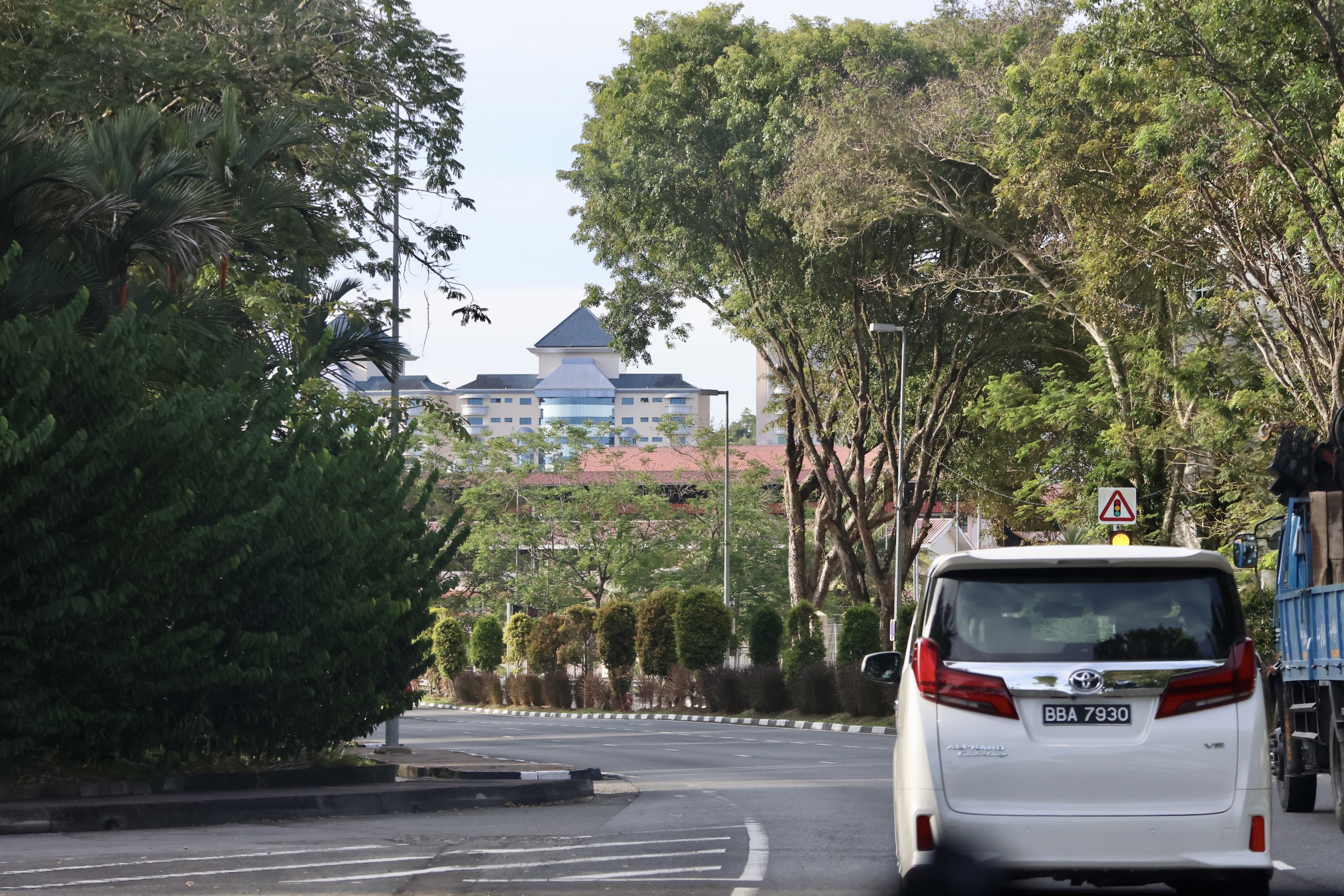

- Location in Brunei
- Coordinates: 4°53′49″N 114°56′13″E
- Country: Brunei
- District: Brunei-Muara
- Mukim: Kianggeh
- Postcode: BA1411

Pusar Ulak is a village in Bandar Seri Begawan, the capital of Brunei. It is officially a village subdivision under Mukim Kianggeh, Brunei-Muara District. The postcode for Pusar Ulak is BA1411.

== Infanstructures ==
As part of a project to construct three pedestrian bridges in Brunei, Suyoi Osman presided over the opening of the pedestrian bridge at Jalan Pusar Ulak Radial Road in Kampung Kiulap on 5 March 2013. The project, which has a B$1,078,000 total contract value, intends to increase pedestrian safety and convenience, particularly close to schools.

=== Education ===
- St. Andrew's School – an anglican private school founded in 1956.
- St. George's School – an anglican private school established in 1937.
- Sultan Omar Ali Saifuddien College – the first government secondary school in Brunei, established in 1951.
- Pusar Ulak Primary School – a local government primary school.

=== Recreation ===
- Sultan Haji Hassanal Bolkiah Silver Jubilee Park – a public park opened in 2004.

=== Religion ===
- St. Andrew's Church – an anglican church that runs the St. Andrew's School.
- Church of Our Lady of Assumption – a catholic church completed in 1969.

== See also ==
- List of neighbourhoods in Bandar Seri Begawan
