= Jamil Al-Sufri =

Bruneian historian (1921–2021)

Yang Dimuliakan Pehin Jawatan Dalam Seri Maharaja Dato Seri Utama Jamil Al-Sufri DK DSLJ DPMB POAS PHBS PBLI PJK PKL
- جاميل الصوفري
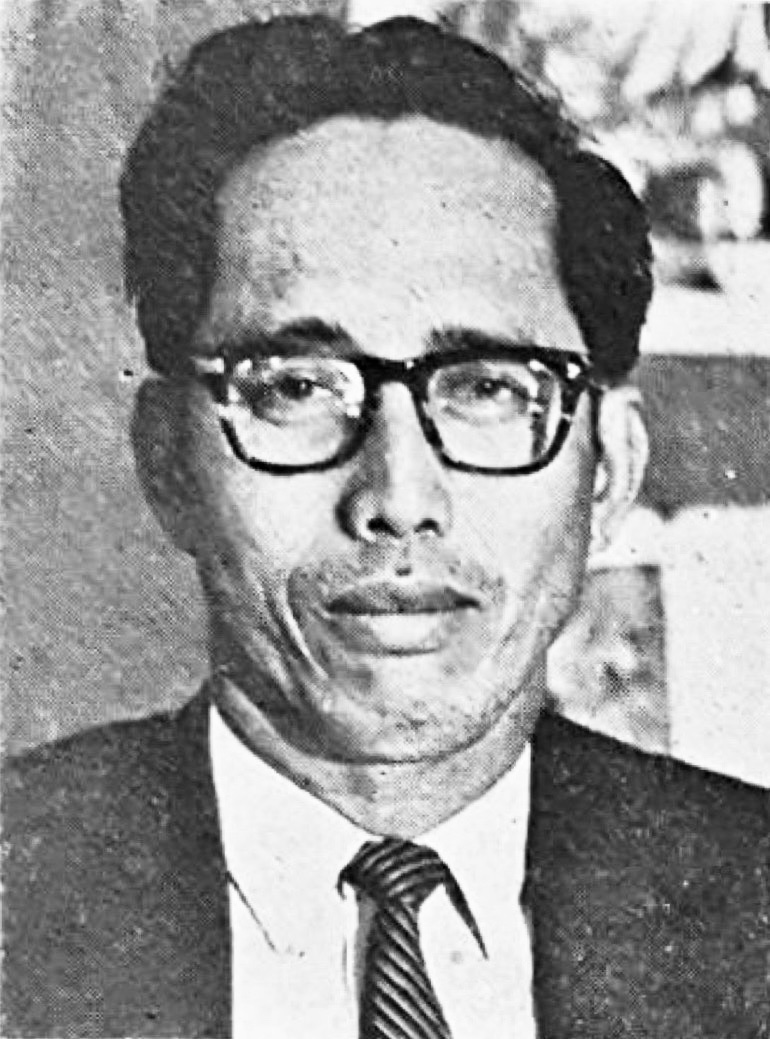
- Dato Jamil in 1967

1st Principal of Brunei History Centre
- In office 26 January 1982 – 4 March 2021
- Preceded by: Position established
- Succeeded by: Hadi Melayong

Member of Legislative Council
- In office 1965–1983

Personal details
- Born: 10 December 1921 Kampong Sungai Kedayan, Brunei Town, Brunei
- Died: 4 March 2021 (aged 99) Raja Isteri Pengiran Anak Saleha Hospital, Bandar Seri Begawan, Brunei
- Resting place: Rangas Cemetery, Bandar Seri Begawan, Brunei
- Other political affiliations: BARIP (1946–1947)
- Spouse: Siti Hara
- Children: 6
- Parent(s): Umar Rendah (father); Siti Aishah Jalil (mother)
- Relatives: Abdul Aziz Umar (half-brother); Abdul Rahman Taha (brother-in-law)
- Education: Sultan Idris Training College; Worcester Teacher Training College
- Occupation: Historian; writer; teacher

Mohammad Jamil Al-Sufri bin Umar (10 December 1921 – 4 March 2021), pen name Wijaya, was a Bruneian aristocrat, historian and teacher who served as a member of the Royal Council, member of the Royal Succession Council, member of the Islamic Religious Council, and member of the Privy Council. He has also been referred to as the National Historian. He wrote works on the country's history, ancestry, customs and traditions, royal titles, Malay Islamic Monarchy (MIB), education, writings on Brunei heroes, and other topics.

Pehin Jamil has seen Brunei grow both under British patronage and under the Japanese occupation. Sultan Ahmad Tajuddin, Sultan Omar Ali Saifuddien III, and Sultan Hassanal Bolkiah were the three Bruneian sultans that he lived under. He was a highly experienced national historian due to his testimony on significant events that occurred in Brunei, such as the Japanese occupation of Brunei, the British Residency, the 1962 Brunei revolt, independence in 1984, and others.

== Early life and education ==
Mohammad Jamil Al-Sufri bin Haji Umar was born on 10 December 1921 at Kampong Sungai Kedayan of Kampong Ayer. He was the son of an Ulama and nobleman, Begawan Pehin Udana Khatib Dato Seri Paduka Haji Umar. He married Siti Hara Taha (died 2012), and together they have a daughter, Normah Suria Hayati, permanent secretary of Ministry of Industry and Primary Resources. Notably, he is also the half brother of Abdul Aziz Umar.

Jamil obtained his early education at Brunei Town Malay School from 1928 to 1935. Following two years of study at the Sultan Idris Training College (SITC) from 1939 to 1941, he returned to Brunei, began his teaching profession, and rose to the position of deputy director of elementary schools. He continued his education at Kuching's Kanri Yosezyo Training Centre during the Japanese occupation from 1944 to 1945. In 1946, he returned to Brunei and assumed the position of general secretary of Barisan Pemuda (BARIP), a group affiliated to the Pengiran Muda Omar Ali Saifuddien, the future Sultan. He also served as a member of Brunei's delegation to several meetings on the formation of the Malaysian Federation.

Later, he held positions as an assistant headmaster from 1948 to 1950. He returned to SITC from 1948 to 1949, and afterwards attended the Agricultural College of Selangor from 1950 to 1951. He subsequently finished his training in England by enrolling in a history course at the Worcester Teacher Training College 1956 to 1957.

== Career ==
In 1949, when Brunei's education was placed under British administration, James Pearce, the Education Officer, decided to stop teaching Jawi script because he thought it was impeding pupils' learning. Jamil and local resisted this decision as many Bruneian children were left without the capacity to read Jawi would have a detrimental effect on their access to religious scriptures and sense of cultural identity. After it was realised how harmful they were, Jawi lessons were finally brought back into the classroom.

Jamil was made an unofficial member of the LegCo from 1959 to 1983, becoming official in 1965, and a member of the Privy Council from 1959 until his death. He was named Director of the Language Board from 1961 until 1964. From 1965 until 1975, he served as the Brunei Language Board's chairman before it changed its name to the Language and Library Board (Dewan Bahasa dan Pustaka; DBP).

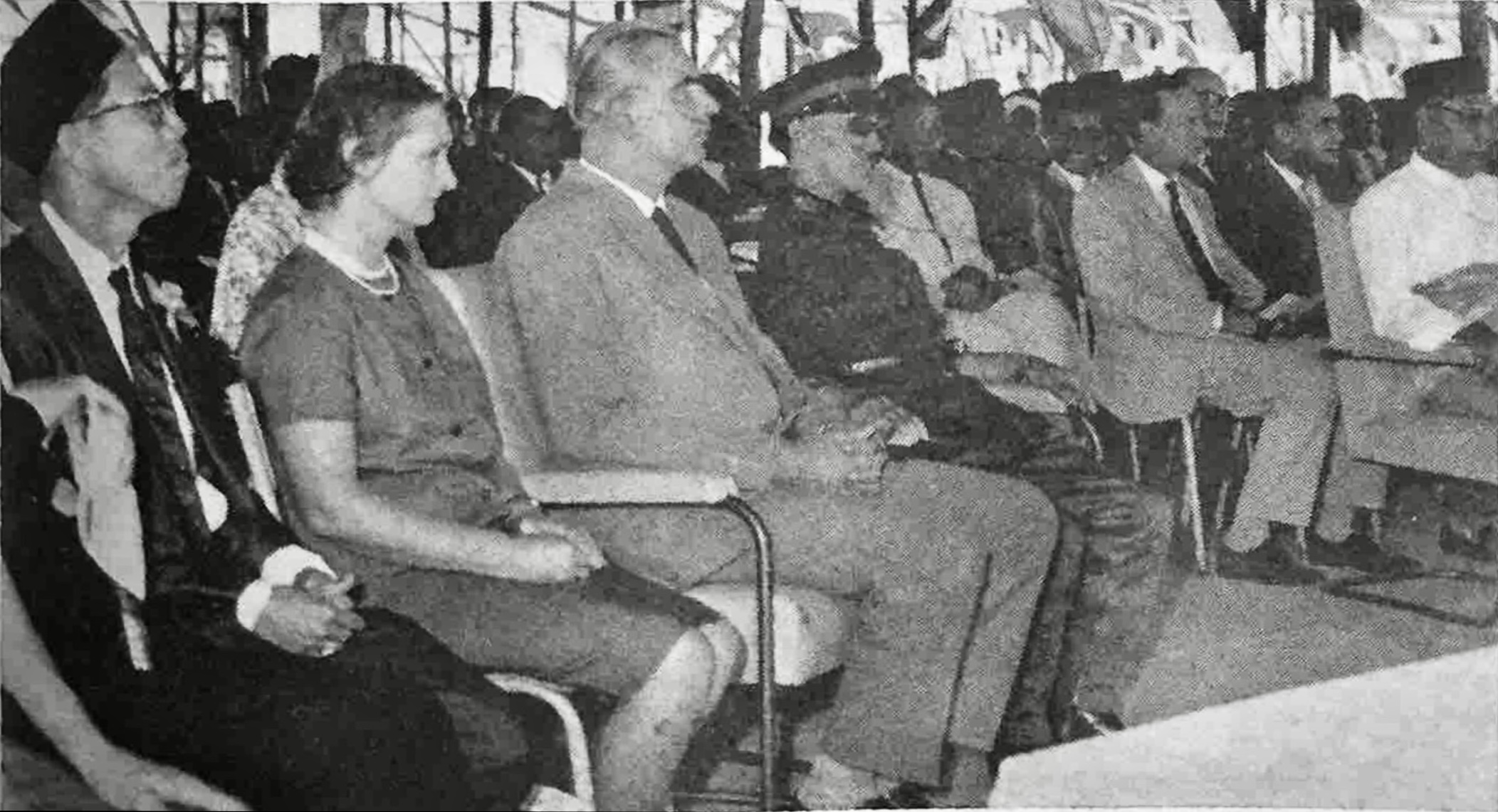
Dato Jamil, Fernley Webber and Sultan Omar Ali Saifuddien at the groundbreaking ceremony of the DBP building in 1965

The Malay language is not only the official language but also the language that unites the people and residents of the country. This was emphasised in his speech as the Director prior to the construction of the DBP building and the Brunei Broadcasting and Information Department, which was attended by Sultan Omar Ali Saifuddien III in 1965.

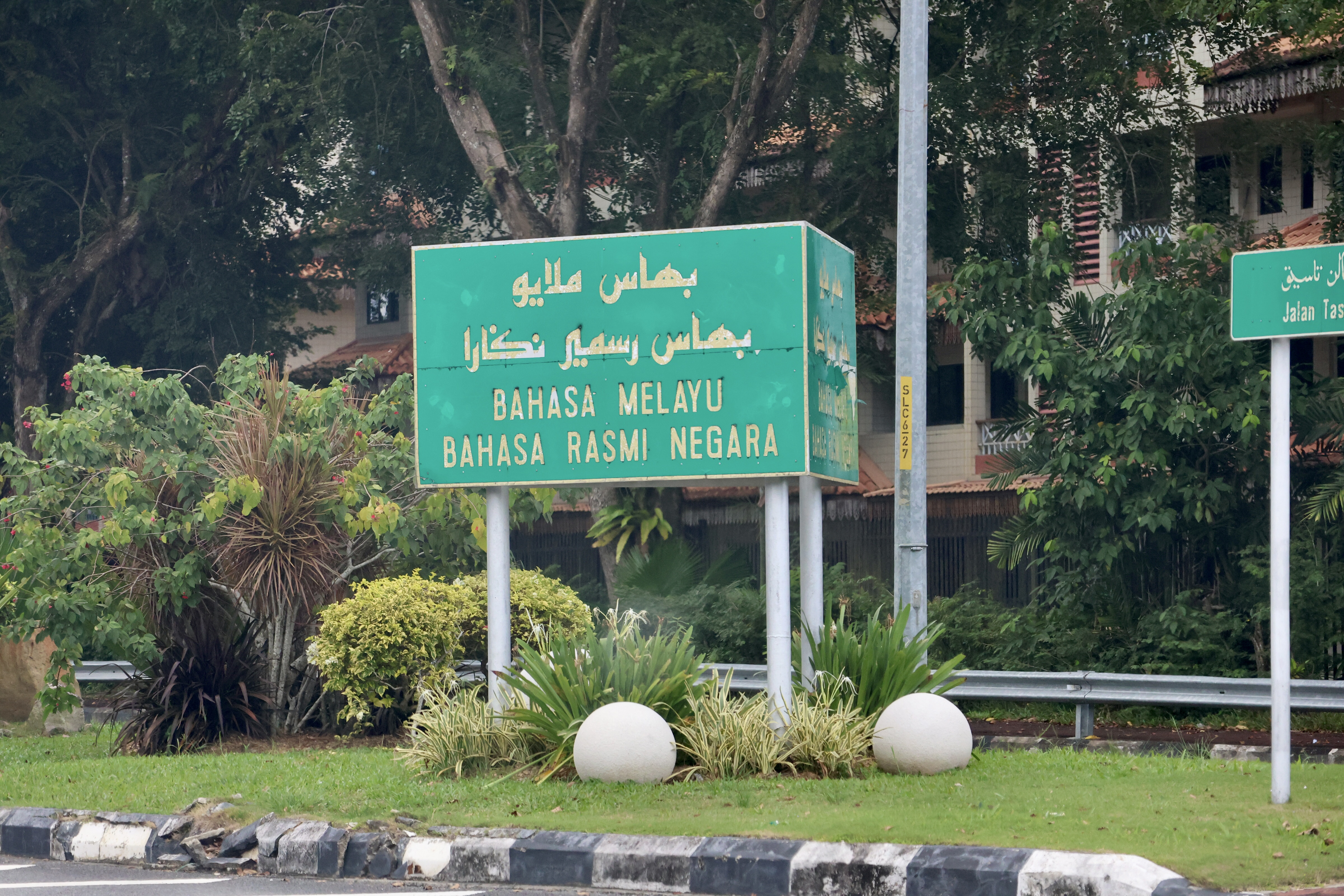
Bahasa Melayu Bahasa Rasmi Negara sign in Tungkadeh

Following this, the placement of signboards that read Bahasa Melayu Bahasa Rasmi Negara, 'The Malay Language is the Official Language of the Nation', on the roadways up to this point is a result of his leadership in the effort to elevate the Malay language. Subsequently, he organised a Language Month Campaign utilising literary and linguistic exercise. This campaign includes associations, workers from the public and commercial sectors, and students. He was later conferred Honorary Litt.D by the American Institute of Science Indiana, USA in 1968.

Asbol Mail's study indicates that on 13 May 1969, riots in Malaysia had an impact on education, which led to the drafting of the 1972 Education Policy announced by Pehin Jamil. As a result, the Malaysian government promptly implemented the National Education Policy in 1969, giving priority to Malay as the language of instruction in all English, Chinese, and Tamil schools. To ensure that it doesn't occur in Brunei, the Education Policy studied for this reason.

When Pehin Jamil was assigned to investigate prior to the implementation of the 1972 Education Policy, he considered Brunei's educational system. Despite the generality of this idea, he believes that Brunei's education may advance toward becoming Negara Zikir itself. His primary goal is to transform Brunei into a real nation that is obedient to Allah and the Sultan and advantageous to the people and the nation.

Pehin Jamil became the director of the Language and Literature Bureau from 1977 to 1981. From 1982 until his death, he served as principal of the Brunei History Centre and member of the Privy Council from 1959 until his death. He was the chairman of the Education Council in 1983. He held a number of significant posts before Brunei achieved complete independence in 1984 and contributed to the development of Brunei. He also served on the Royal Succession Council (Majlis Mesyuarat Mengangkat Raja).

The idea of creating a Federation of Malaysia to unite Malaya, the colony of Singapore, and the three British Borneo regions was put out in 1961 by Tunku Abdul Rahman, the Prime Minister of Malaya. At first, everyone was on board with the concept, but Brunei and Singapore would later back out. It was during the meeting between then Sultan Omar Ali Saifuddien III and A. M. Azahari with Pehin Jamil in presence. He firmly held his ground on accusing A. M. Azahari of being a liar.

== Death ==
At seven in the morning, Pehin Jamil, who was 99 years old, died at Raja Isteri Pengiran Anak Saleha Hospital on 4 March 2021. At Kampong Mabohai in Bandar Seri Begawan, Sultan Hassanal Bolkiah, ministers, and dignitaries paid their final respects to Pehin Jamil on Wednesday morning of the same day. The funeral prayer was offered by the Sultan under the direction of Pehin Abdul Aziz Juned, the State Mufti.

== Books ==
- Tarsilah Brunei. Brunei: Brunei History Centre, Ministry of Culture, Youth and Sports. 2000. ISBN 9789991734033.
- History of Brunei in Brief. Brunei: Brunei History Centre, Ministry of Culture, Youth and Sports. 2000. ISBN 9789991734118.
- Chorak pendidekan di-Brunei pada masa hadapan. Brunei: Majlis Pelajaran Brunei. 1982.
- Brunei Darussalam. Brunei: Brunei History Centre, Ministry of Culture, Youth and Sports. 2007. ISBN 9789991734538.
- Chatatan sejarah perwira2 dan pembesar2 Brunei. Vol. 1. Brunei: Dewan Bahasa dan Pustaka. 1971.
- Legasi payung negara. Brunei: Brunei History Centre. 2019. ISBN 9789991763699.
- Melayu Islam Beraja. Brunei: Brunei History Centre, Ministry of Culture, Youth and Sports. 2008. ISBN 9789991734637.
- Satu pemikiran mengenai pendidikan untuk Brunei Darussalam berasaskan Islam. Brunei: Brunei History Centre, Ministry of Culture, Youth and Sports. 2008. ISBN 9789991734675.
- Latar belakang sejarah Brunei. Brunei: Brunei History Centre, Ministry of Culture, Youth and Sports. 1990.
- Sejarah sultan-sultan Brunei menaiki takhta. Brunei: Brunei History Centre, Ministry of Culture, Youth and Sports. 2002. ISBN 9789991734255.
- Liku-liku perjuangan pencapaian kemerdekaan Negara Brunei Darussalam. Brunei: Brunei History Centre, Ministry of Culture, Youth and Sports. 1992.
- Rampai sejarah. Brunei: Brunei History Centre, Ministry of Culture, Youth and Sports. 2005. ISBN 9789991734446.
- Survival Brunei. Brunei: Brunei History Centre, Ministry of Culture, Youth and Sports. 1997.

== Titles, styles and honours ==
=== Titles and styles ===
Pehin Jamil was given the Manteri title of Pehin Orang Kaya Amar Diraja on 14 March 1968, upgraded to Pehin Jawatan Dalam Seri Maharaja on 25 August 1992. The titles are styled as Yang Dimuliakan.

- 14 March 1968 – 25 August 1992: Pehin Orang Kaya Amar Diraja
- 25 August 1992 – 4 March 2021: Pehin Jawatan Dalam Seri Maharaja

=== Awards ===
- S.E.A Write Award (2010)

=== Honours ===
He has earned the following honours;

- Family Order of Seri Utama (DK; 1970) – Dato Seri Utama
- Order of Seri Paduka Mahkota Brunei Second Class (DPMB; 23 September 1965) – Dato Paduka
- Order of Paduka Seri Laila Jasa Second Class (DSLJ; 23 September 1967) – Dato Seri Laila Jasa
- Omar Ali Saifuddin Medal (POAS; 23 September 1963)
- Sultan Hassanal Bolkiah Medal First Class (PHBS; 15 July 1970)
- Pingat Bakti Laila Ikhlas (PBLI; 25 October 2001)
- Meritorious Service Medal (PJK; 15 July 1972)
- Coronation Medal (1 August 1968)
- Long Service Medal (PKL; 23 September 1959)
- Sultan of Brunei Silver Jubilee Medal (5 October 1992)
