= Abdul Rahman Taha =

Bruneian civil servant (1930–2005)

Yang Dimuliakan Lagi Dihormati Pehin Orang Kaya Di-Gadong Seri Diraja Dato Laila Utama Abdul Rahman Taha DK SPMB DSSUB DSLJ PSB POAS PHBS PBLI PJK MVO
- عبد الرحمن طه
- Born: 27 April 1930; Kampong Sungai Kedayan, Brunei Town, Brunei
- Died: 16 July 2005 (aged 75); Bandar Seri Begawan, Brunei
- Education: Royal College of Art
- Occupation: Civil servant
- Known for: Member of Privy Council, Adat Istiadat Council and Brunei Islamic Religious Council
- Children: Ahmad Morshidi; Mohammad Mahdi; Mohammad Hanafi
- Relatives: Nawawi Taha (brother); Jamil Al-Sufri (brother-in-law)

Abdul Rahman bin Haji Mohammad Taha (27 April 1930 – 16 July 2005) was a Bruneian aristocrat and civil servant who served as the long-time chairman of the Public Service Commission (SPA) and held key roles, including Privy Councillor and member of the Brunei Islamic Religious Council (MUIB). He was also part of Sultan Omar Ali Saifuddien III's entourage during the 1962 hajj pilgrimage.

== Early life and education ==
Abdul Rahman was born on 27 April 1930, in Kampong Sungai Kedayan, Brunei Town. He was the son of Pehin Orang Kaya Shahbandar Haji Mohd. Taha, a member of the aristocracy. He received his early education at the Brunei Town Malay School and later pursued studies at the Royal College of Art in London, driven by his passion for handicrafts.

== Career ==
From the founding of the Sultan Haji Hassanal Bolkiah Foundation (YSHHB) in 1992 until 2001, Pehin Abdul Rahman served as its chairman. Sultan Hassanal Bolkiah personally thanked him for his contributions to the YSHHB in a titah (speech), praising his leadership and commitment in its founding. He also played a significant role in establishing the Dana Pengiran Muda Mahkota Al-Muhtadee Billah for Orphans, serving as chairman of the board of trustees from its inception in 1998 for three years.

Additionally, Pehin Abdul Rahman led the Brunei Arts and Handicraft Training Centre from 1975 and was honoured with an ASEAN award in 1990 for his contributions to arts and crafts. His service extended further, as he held various leadership roles, including acting president of the Islamic Unity Association of Brunei, chairman of the advisory committee on detainees, member of the UBD Convocation Committee, and senior director of NBT (Brunei). Appointed directly by the Sultan, he has served as the chairman of the Public Service Commission. In addition to various high-ranking roles, including member of the Adat Istiadat Council, Brunei Islamic Religious Council (MUIB), Council of Regency, Privy Council, Institute of Islamic Studies, Department of Scholarship Committee, and the legal committee for MUIB.

== Later life and death ==
Pehin Abdul Rahman made a significant contribution to the growth of Brunei's halal poultry sector as a co-founder of Ideal Multifeed Farm (Brunei). Producing and marketing halal chicken goods for the country's Muslim population was the main goal of his vision. His son Ahmad Morshidi, continues to run the business in accordance with his values.

At the age of 75, Pehin Abdul Rahman died in Bandar Seri Begawan on 16 July 2005, at 8:00 p.m.

== Personal life ==
Pehin Abdul Rahman's family is notable for their contributions in various fields. His sister, Siti Hara, married historian Jamil Al-Sufri, while his brother, Mohd Nawawi, served as the personal and confidential secretary to Sultan Hassanal Bolkiah until 2023. His children have also made significant achievements: Ahmad Morshidi served as a Legislative Councillor from 2011 to 2015 and is a businessperson; Mohammad Hanafi is the founder of Hanafi Konsaltan and the president of the National Chamber of Commerce and Industry of Brunei Darussalam; and Mohammad Mahdi was permanent representative of Brunei to the United Nations in Geneva from 2014 to 2019.

== Titles, styles and honours ==
=== Titles and styles ===
The Sultan have conferred several Manteri titles to Abdul Rahman as a way of honouring the contributions and dedication that he provided to the monarch and the nation. These titles include:

- 15 April 1955 – 1 August 1958: Pehin Bendahari
- 1 August 1958 – 11 June 1970: Pehin Orang Kaya Maharaja Diraja
- 11 June 1970 – 12 April 1975: Pehin Orang Kaya Laksamana
- 12 April 1975 – 19 April 1979: Pehin Jawatan Dalam Seri Maharaja
- 19 April 1979 – 24 August 1992: Pehin Orang Kaya Di-Gadong Seri Lela
- 24 August 1992 – 16 July 2005: Pehin Orang Kaya Di-Gadong Seri Diraja

=== Honours ===
He has been bestowed upon the following honours:

National

- Family Order of Laila Utama (DK; 1972) – Dato Laila Utama
- Family Order of Seri Utama (DK; 1 January 1968) – Dato Seri Utama
- Order of Seri Paduka Mahkota Brunei First Class (SPMB; 12 February 1969) – Dato Seri Paduka
- Order of Seri Paduka Mahkota Brunei Second Class (DPMB; 23 September 1965) – Dato Paduka
- Order of Islam Brunei Second Class (DSSUB; 15 July 1972) – Dato Seri Setia
- Order of Paduka Seri Laila Jasa Second Class (DSLJ; 23 September 1967) – Dato Seri Laila Jasa
- Order of Setia Negara Brunei Fourth Class (PSB; 23 September 1963)
- Sultan Hassanal Bolkiah Medal (PHBS; 1969)
- Omar Ali Saifuddin Medal First Class (POAS; 23 September 1959)
- Pingat Bakti Laila Ikhlas (PBLI; 24 February 1987)
- Meritorious Service Medal (PJK; 23 September 1961)
- Long Service Medal (PKL; 8 December 1962)
- Coronation Medal (1969)
- Sultan of Brunei Silver Jubilee Medal (5 October 1992)
- Proclamation of Independence Medal (10 March 1997)
- Campaign Medal (8 December 1962)

Foreign

- United Kingdom:
  - Member of the Royal Victorian Order (MVO; 1972)
