= Gadong, Brunei =

Commercial area in Bandar Seri Begawan

Gadong
- Village and neighbourhood
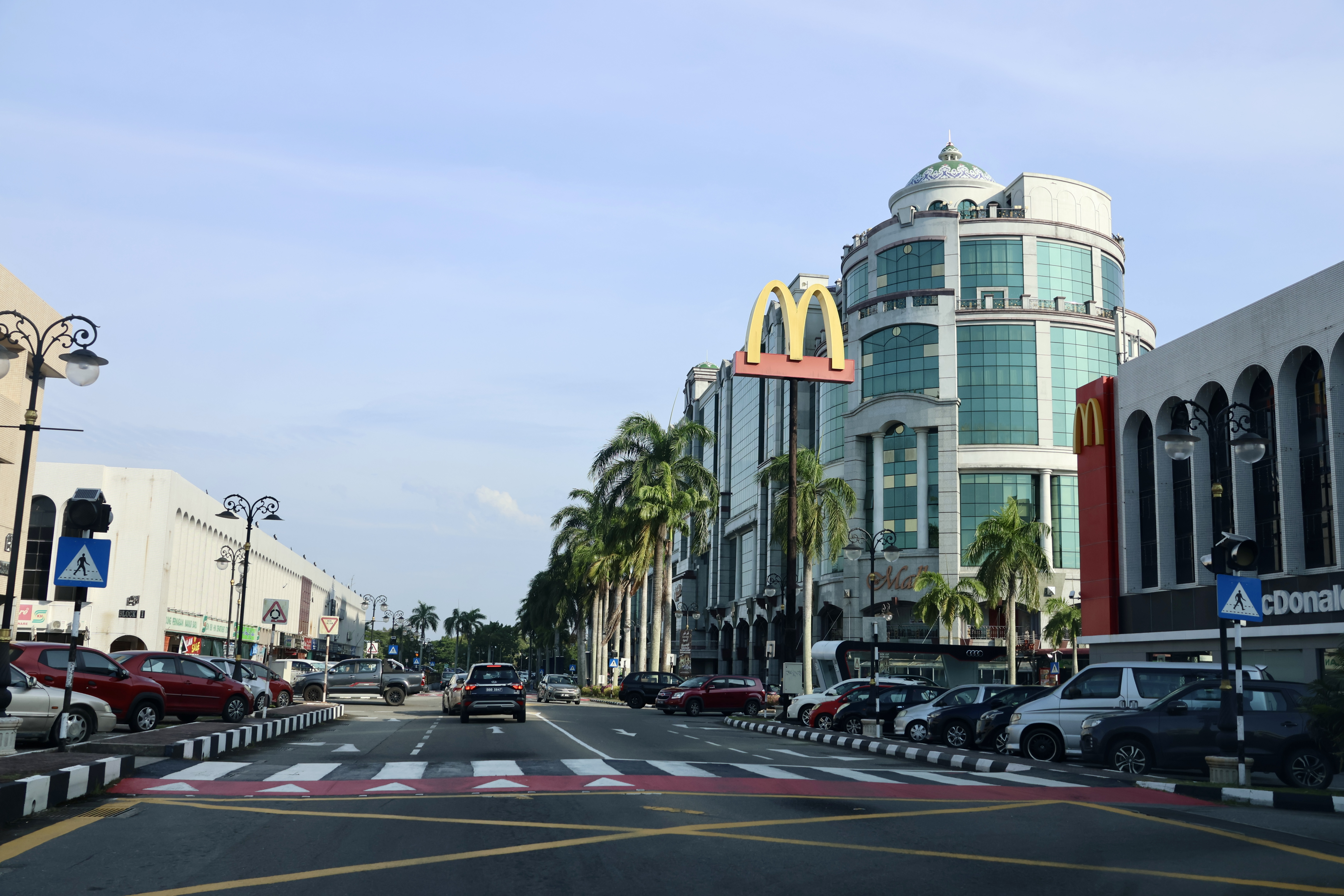
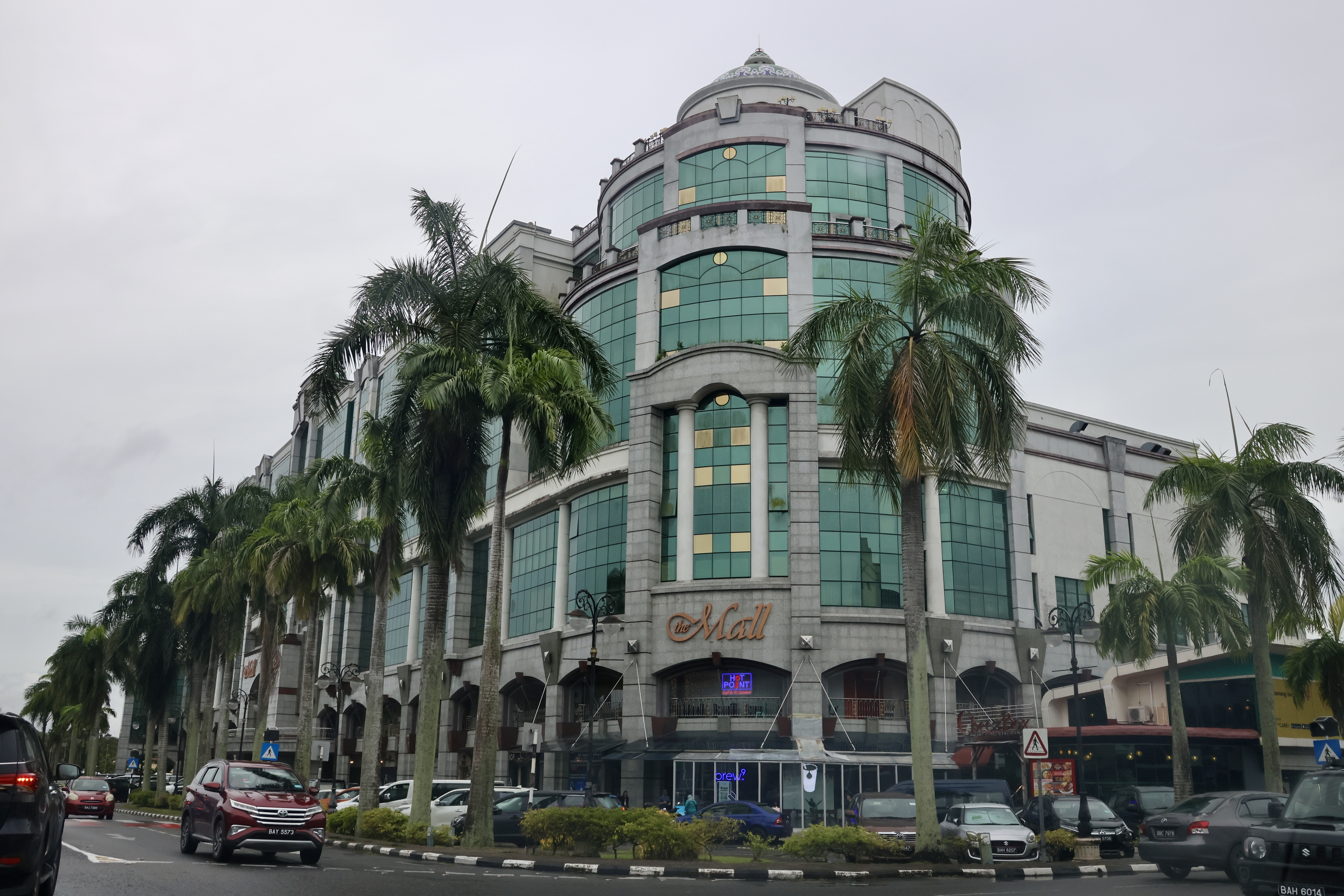
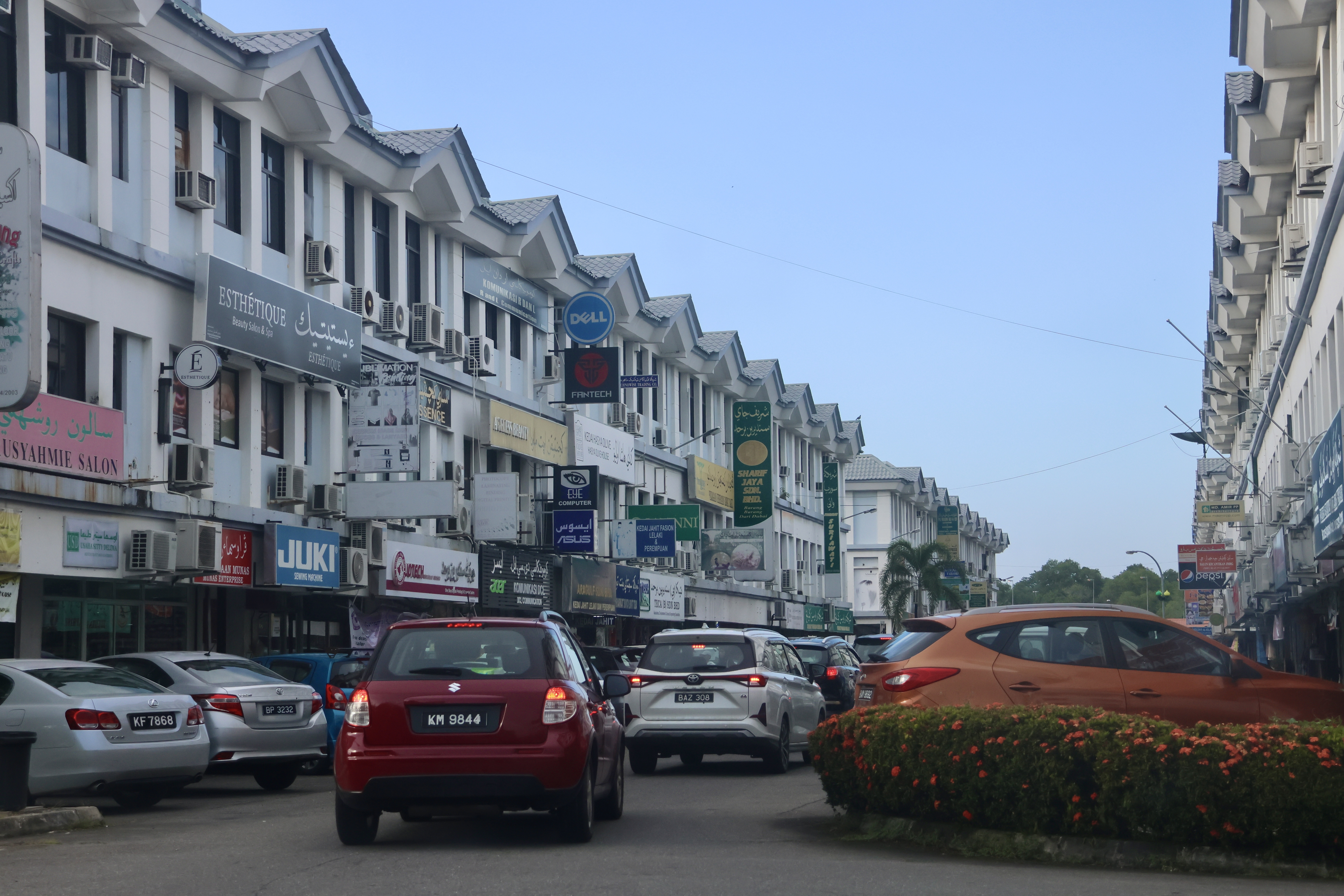
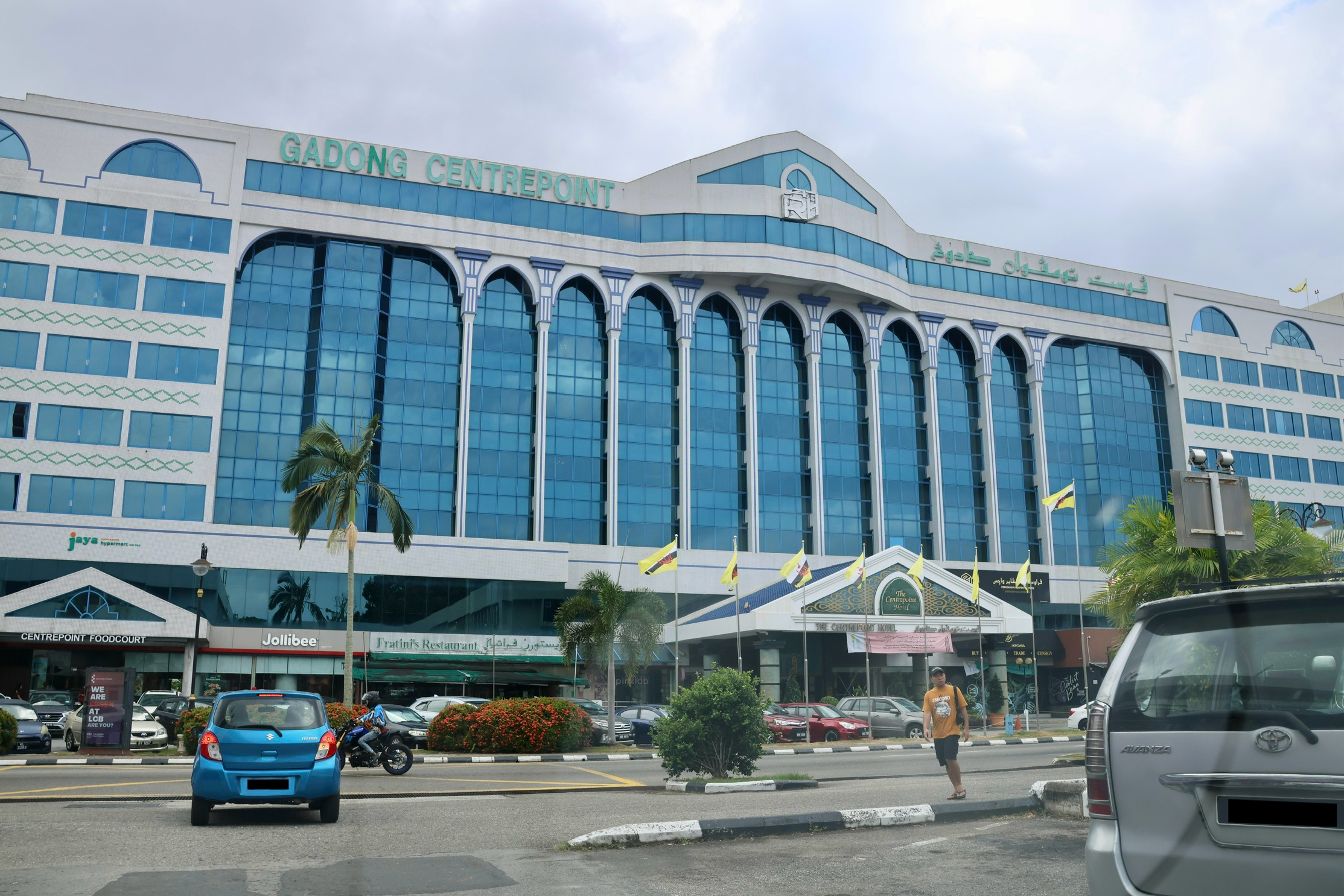
- Clockwise from top left: Abdul Razak Complex, The Mall, The Centrepoint Hotel, Jalan Batu Bersurat shophouses

- Location in Brunei
- Coordinates: 4°54′24.5″N 114°54′59.9″E
- Country: Brunei
- District: Brunei–Muara
- Mukim: Gadong 'B'
- First settled: 20th century

Government
  - Village head: Othaman Patra

Area
  - Total: 254.4872 ha (628.852 acres)

Population (2021)
  - Total: 3,356
  - Density: 1,319/km^{2} (3,415/sq mi)
- Time zone: UTC+8 (BNT)
- Postcode: BE3719

Kampong Pengkalan Gadong (Malay: Kampung Pengkalan Gadong) or commonly known as Gadong (Malay pronunciation: [gaˈdoŋ]), is a village in Brunei–Muara District, Brunei, as well as a neighbourhood and commercial area in the capital Bandar Seri Begawan. The population was 3,356 in 2021. It is one the villages within Mukim Gadong 'B'. The postcode is BE3719. It is a popular shopping and dining area in the city as well as in Brunei, with several shops, restaurants and cafes establishing their presence in the area. Notably, the area was formerly a rubber estate and was called Gadong Estate or Gadong Rubber Estate.

== Etymology ==
The etymology of the name Gadong is debated. Some believe it is derived from the term gedung, which means warehouse, rather than from gadong, meaning green in Brunei Malay. This suggests that Gadong may have once been home to warehouses, and the name became associated with the area as a metonym for its location. The English word godown, meaning a storage space, shares its roots with the Malay gedong or gudang, which likely originated from the Telugu or Tamil words gidangi or kidangu.

Alternatively, another theory suggests that the name Gadong comes from a fruit of the same name, which grows along the riverside in Pulau Sungai Gadong. According to an old project by Universiti Brunei Darussalam on Brunei streets, the fruit's flesh is edible after being soaked in water and boiled, and has a reddish colour.

== History ==
In the early 20th century, rubber estates were established in Berakas, Gadong, and Temburong, with 2,200 acres (890 ha) allocated for plantations by 1914. By the mid-1920s, Joss' Coghill was overseeing the Gadong Rubber Estate. In 1923, the Island Trading Company-owned estate in Gadong expanded in size. Despite the discovery of oil in Seria before 1931, rubber estates in Berakas, Gadong, and Temburong initially saw slow financial returns from the emerging oil sector.

A 1933 report noted that malaria cases at the Gadong estate were relatively low compared to other estates. By 1934, the estate had a population of 53, with 32 laborers. However, the Government Rubber Estate at Labu (Labu Estate), along with those at Gadong and Berakas, struggled financially, accruing debts amounting to B$221,828.65 by the end of 1965. The state auditor raised concerns about these growing losses in 1966.

The development of Gadong accelerated in the 1960s, following the construction of a bridge connecting Brunei Town to Jalan Gadong and the establishment of key government facilities, such as the Gadong Power Stations, Police Headquarters, and the Land Transport Department. By 1967 or 1968, the completion of Jalan Gadong and its later connection to Jalan Tutong in the early 1970s spurred further expansion. Prior to the construction of this road, the only access to Gadong from the capital was by barge along the Menglait River.

Around 2007, Gadong experienced significant development, particularly through the efforts of Abdul Hapidz-led Abdul Razak Holdings (ARH), which owns a large tract of land in the area. The 24 acres (9.7 ha) Abdul Razak Complex (Note: This should not be confused with the Abdul Razak Plaza in Batu Satu.) has contributed to transforming Gadong into a key area of expansion for Bandar Seri Begawan. The development began with shophouses and gradually included residential properties, a hotel, and a shopping complex with various facilities. According to Ahmad Morshidi, the location of Gadong, adjacent to the highway leading to Brunei International Airport and close to the city centre, has made it a strategic and desirable area for development. (Note: Despite the development's encouraging growth, ARH has chosen to keep ownership of the properties and lease them instead of selling to recoup the mall's investment. The business has no immediate plans to grow even though there is still a need for space.)

== Infrastructure ==
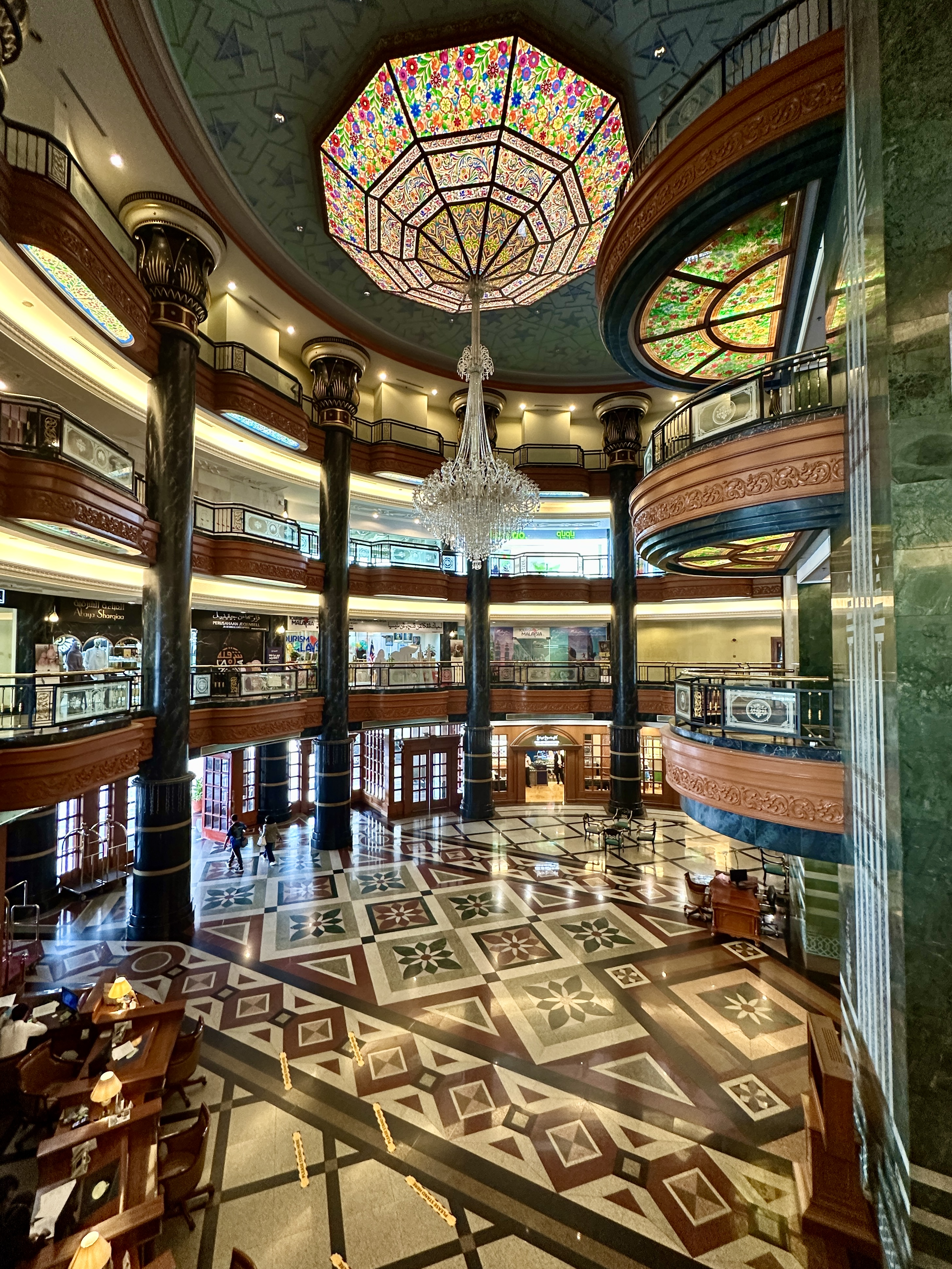
Rizqun International Hotel in 2024

=== Centrepoint Hotel ===
Completed in 1994, the Gadong Centrepoint in the Abdul Razak Complex was developed by ARH and overseen by Toshiba Corporation. The complex includes the Centrepoint Hotel, which offers 216 rooms and suites, including 113 deluxe rooms, 92 junior suites, 9 executive suites, 2 presidential suites, and 2 penthouse suites. It also features 10 meeting rooms and several dining restaurants. The Abdul Razak Complex houses the consulate of Sweden, and the surrounding area is home to the embassy of Oman.

=== The Mall ===
The Rizqun International Hotel and The Mall shopping centre in Gadong are the result of extensive planning that commenced in 1987. With a B$130 million investment, the construction of the complex began in 1999 and was completed over a period of seven years. Officially inaugurated on 9 July 2006 by Crown Prince Al-Muhtadee Billah, The Mall features a three-story structure with two basement parking levels. Situated on a twenty-four-acre plot of land in Gadong, the hotel and mall represent the company's fourth and final major project. One of Brunei's largest shopping centers, the Mall offers a cinema of international calibre, a gym, a supermarket, a food court, cafes, and a variety of stores.

Following the formal ceremony, the prince received a gift from Abdul Hapidz. He then proceeded to tour the hotel's presidential suite and rooms 811–813, before signing the guestbook. The 150-room hotel is part of ARH's efforts to support the Tourism Development Department's strategic goals, helping to promote and grow the sector while increasing job opportunities for locals. The hotel features several meeting rooms, a business centre, a 24/7 coffee shop, and a ballroom that can accommodate over 1,000 people. Since their opening, the Rizqun International Hotel and The Mall have made a significant contribution to the local economy by providing valuable retail and accommodation options.

== Gallery ==
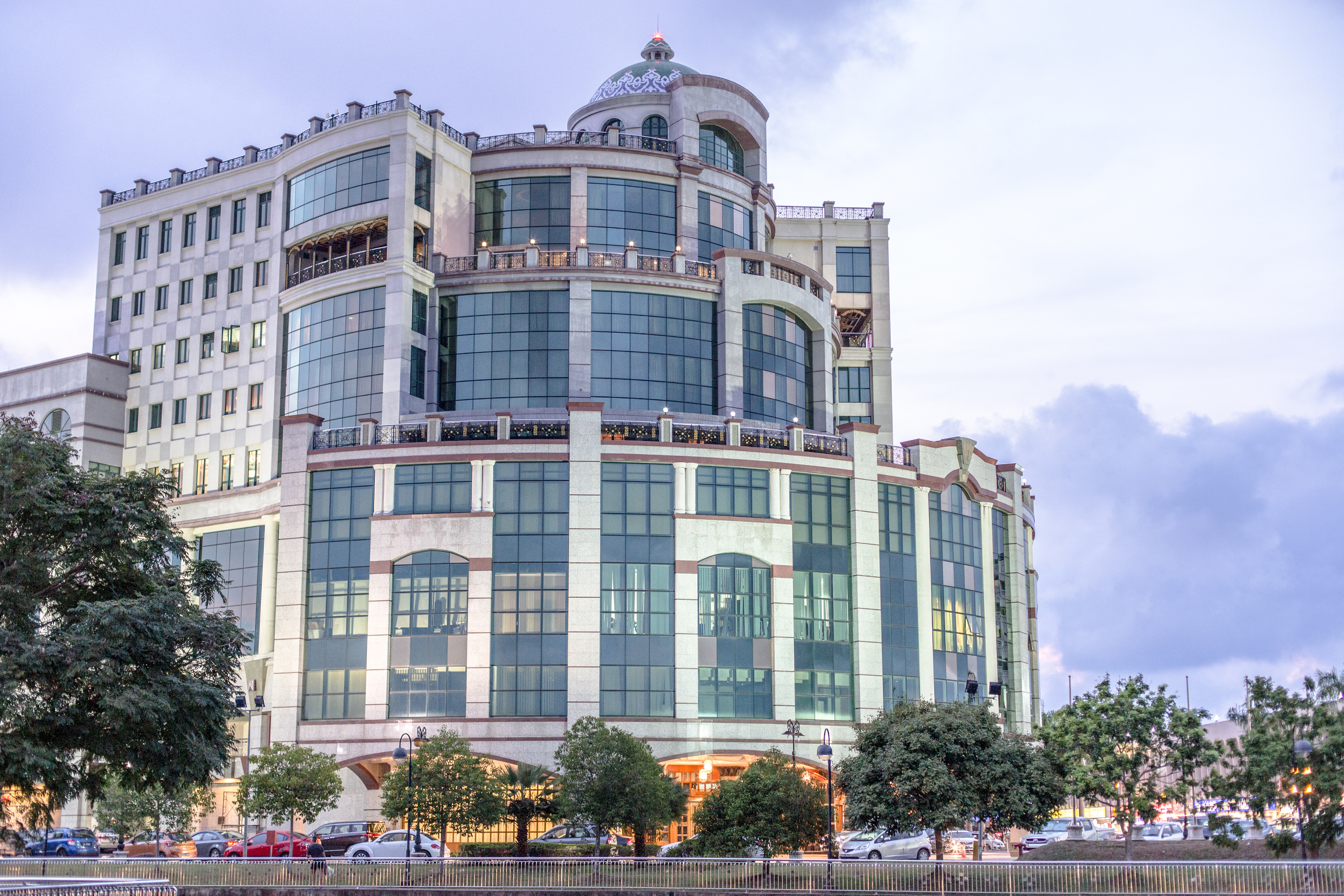
Rizqun International Hotel in 2015

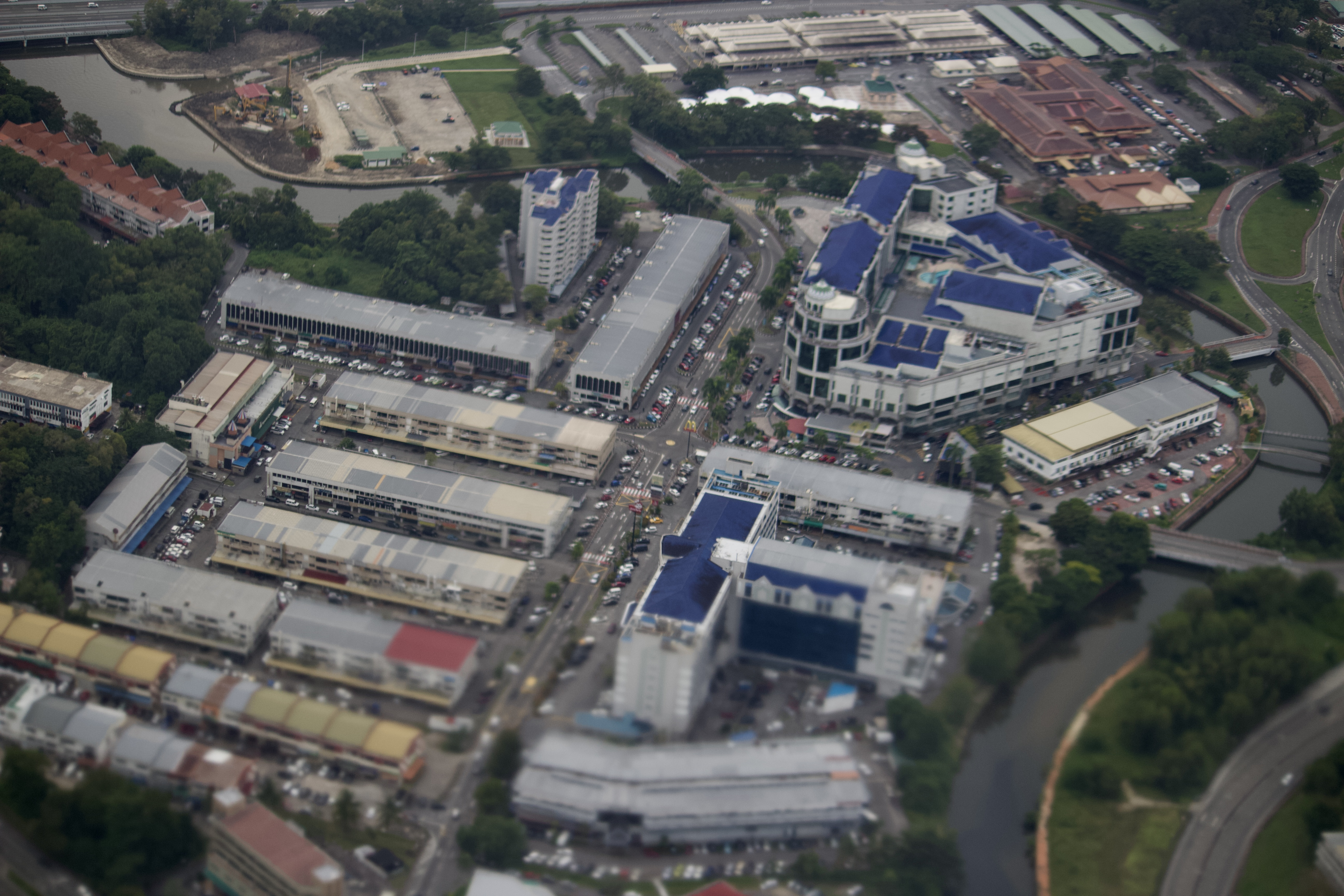
Abdul Razak Complex seen from above in 2022

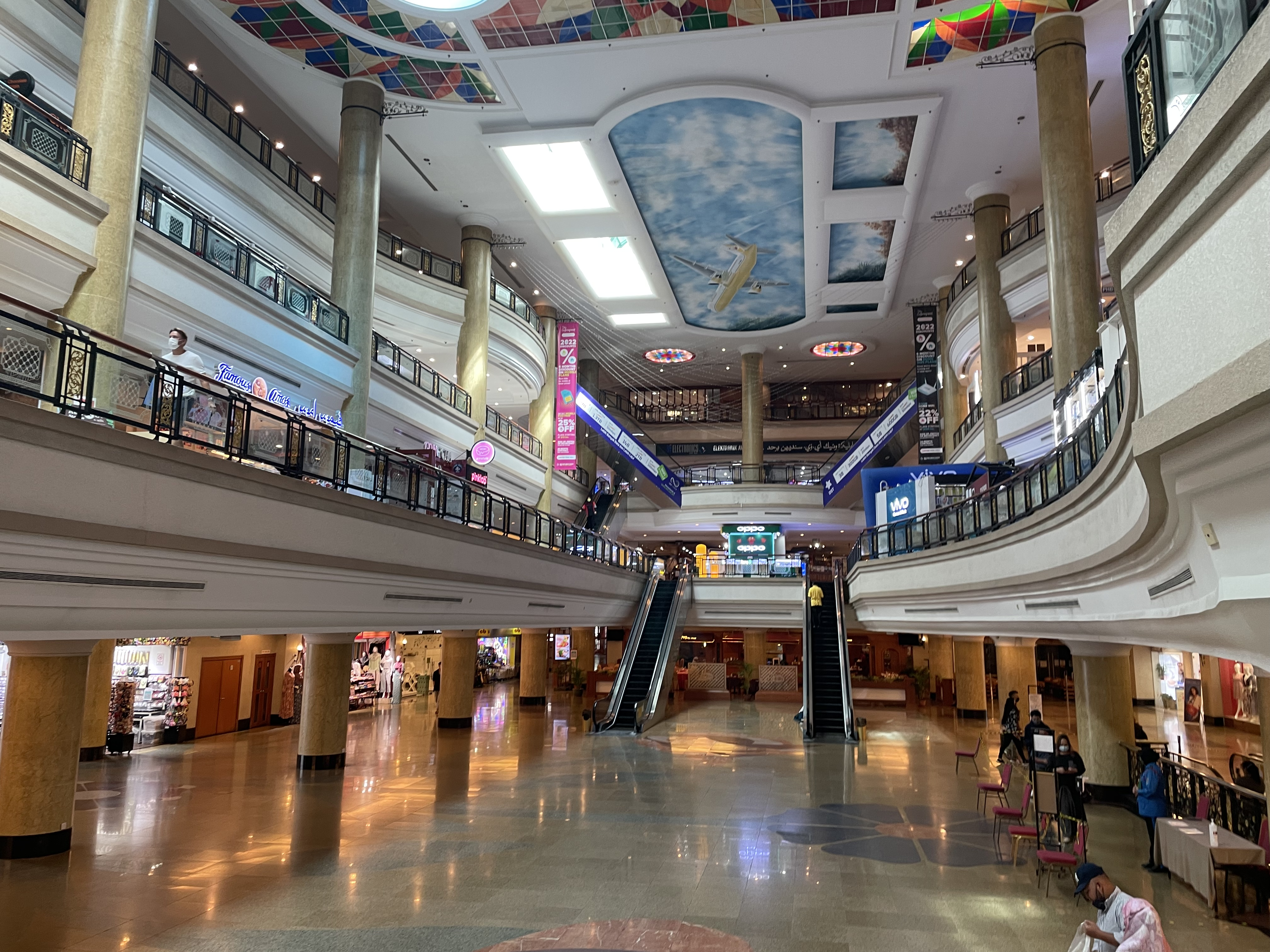
Interior of the Mall

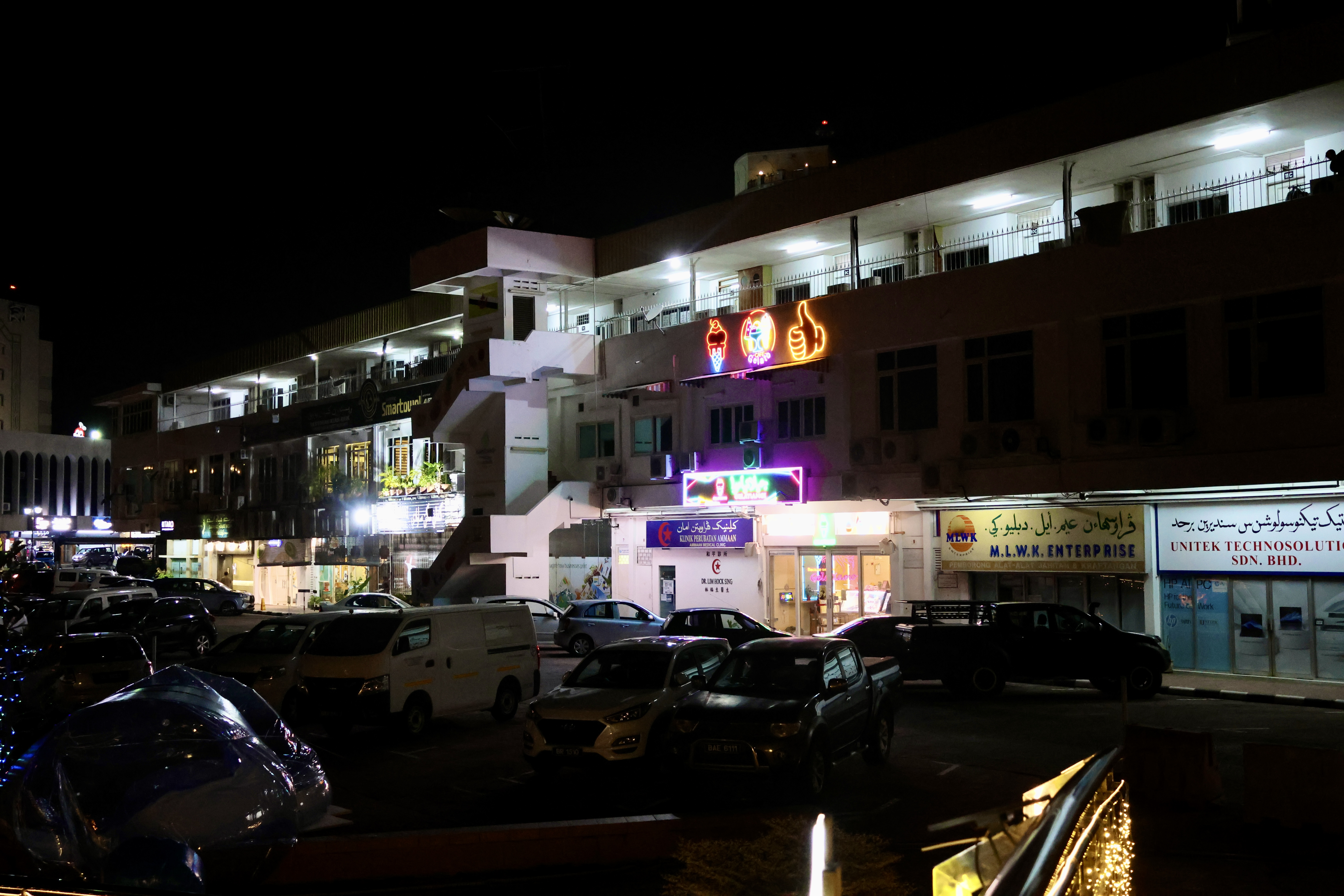
Gadong shophouses at night

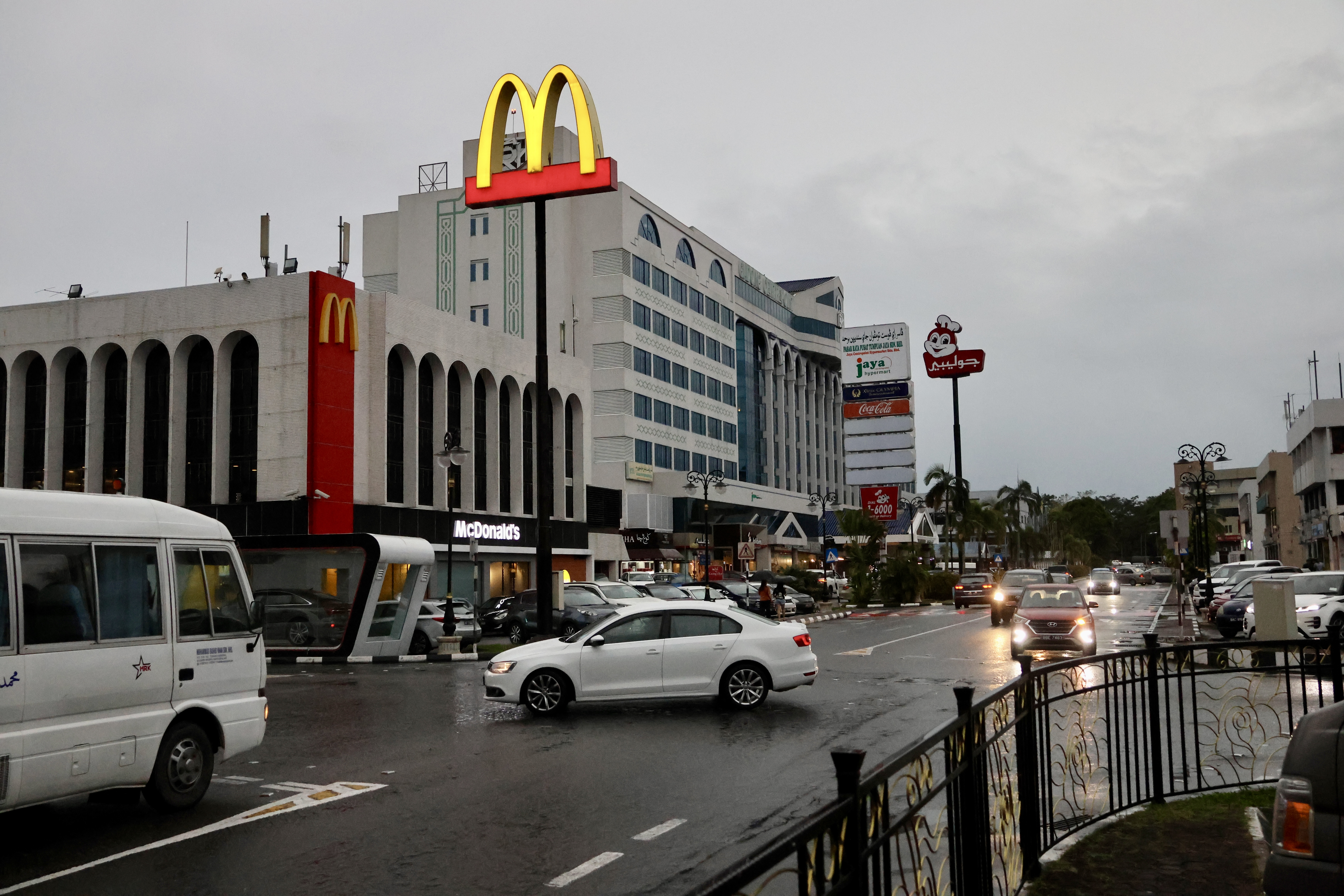
McDonald's restaurant in 2024

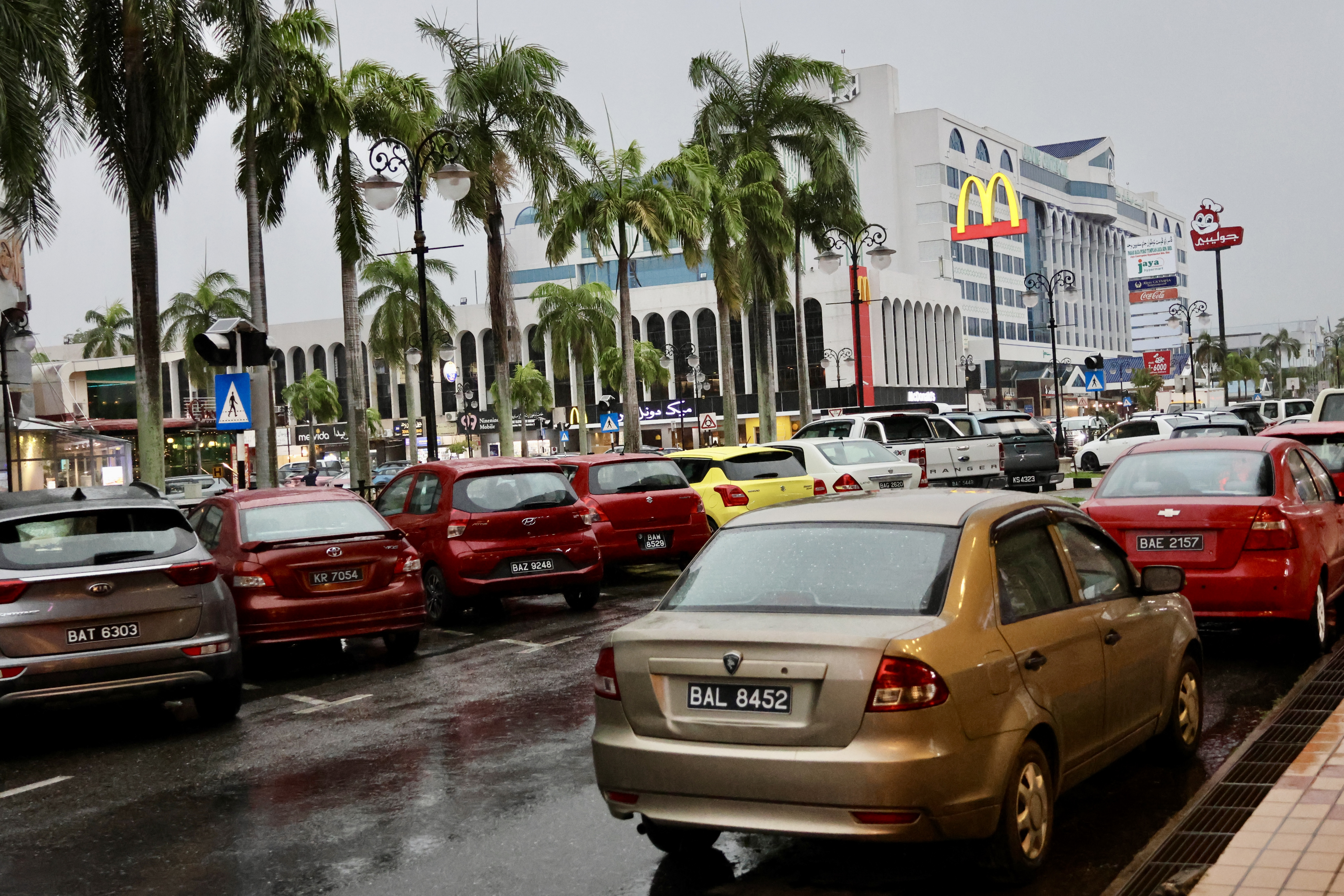
Abdul Razak Complex during the December holiday season
