= Mukim Kianggeh =

Mukim of Brunei

- Mukim
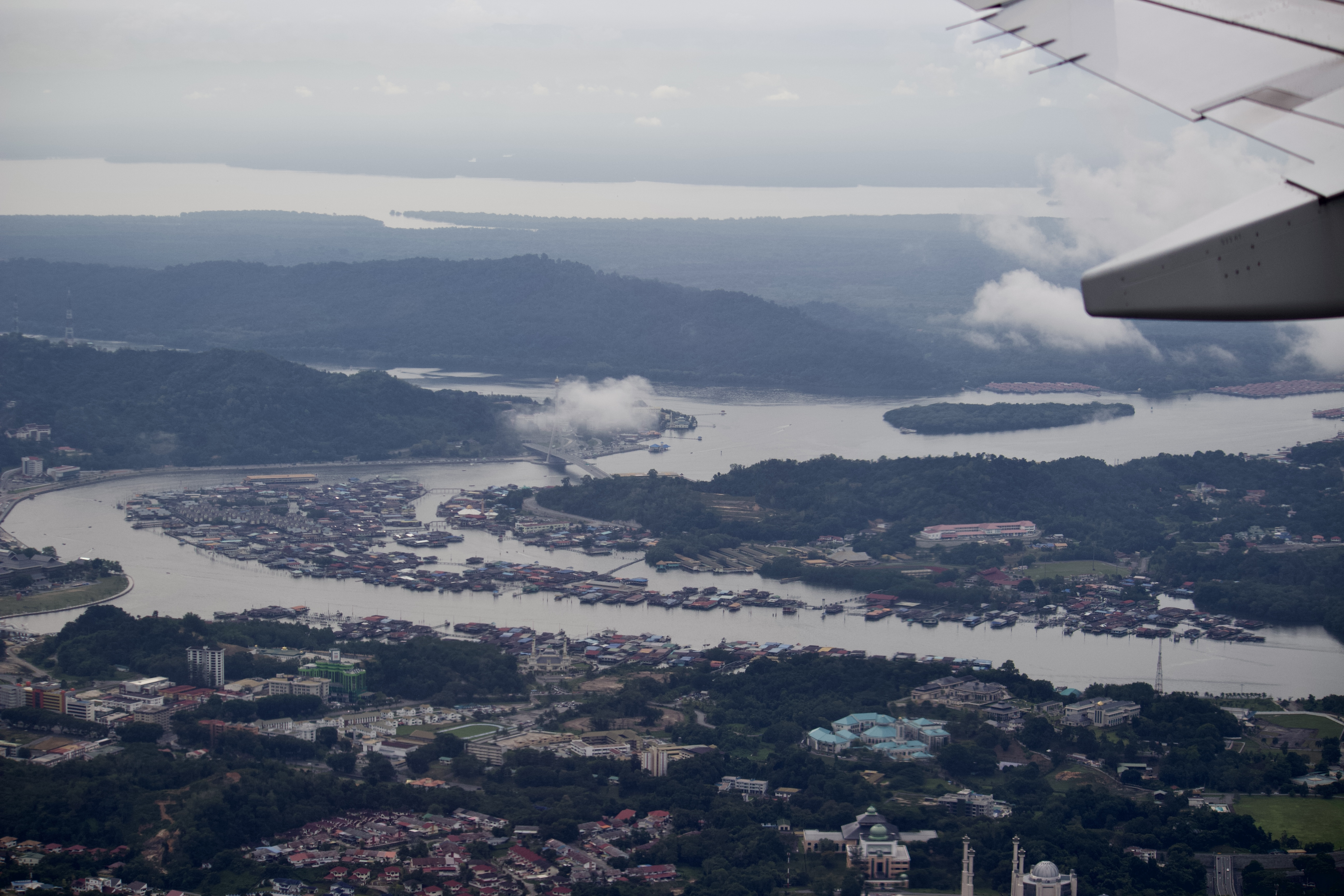
- Pusat Bandar

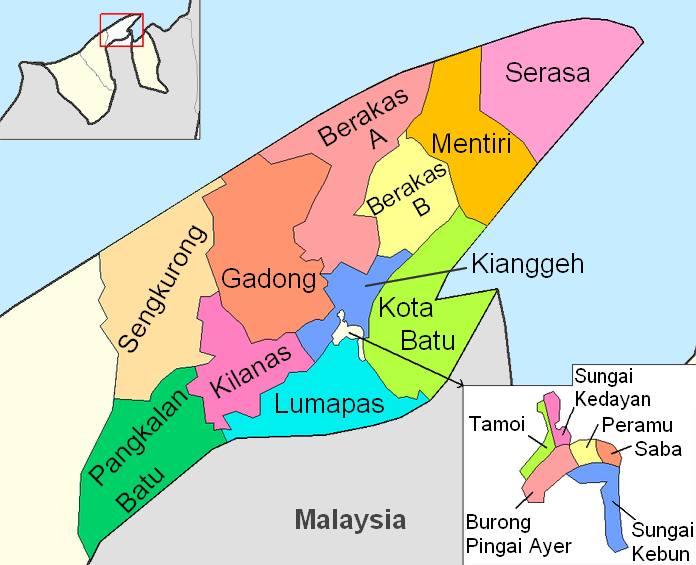
- Kianggeh is in dark blue.
- Coordinates: 4°53′55″N 114°56′02″E
- Country: Brunei
- District: Brunei-Muara

Government
  - Penghulu: Lawi Lamat

Population (2021)
  - Total: 2,341
- Time zone: UTC+8 (BNT)
- Postcode: BAxx11

Mukim Kianggeh is a mukim in Brunei-Muara District, Brunei. The population was 8,228 in 2016. The mukim encompasses Pusat Bandar, the city centre of the capital Bandar Seri Begawan.

== Etymology ==
The name Kianggeh may have been derived from the Chinese term kiang, which means river, according to a book Dokumentasi. Although it is also conceivable that the name Kianggeh was derived from the name of a person, nothing has been documented about this as of yet.

== Geography ==
The mukim is located in the central part of the district, bordering Mukim Berakas 'A' and Mukim Berakas 'B' to the north, Mukim Kota Batu to the east and south, the mukims within Kampong Ayer and Mukim Lumapas to the south, Mukim Kilanas to the south-west and Mukim Gadong 'B' to the west.

== Demographics ==
As of 2016 census, the population was 8,228 with 49% males and 51% females. The mukim had 2,140 households occupying 2,104 dwellings. The entire population lived in urban areas.

== Administration ==
As of 2021, the mukim comprised the following census villages:

Settlements	Population (2021)	Ketua kampung (2024)
Pusat Bandar	314	—N/a
Kampong Kianggeh	1,328	—N/a
Kampong Berangan	456	—N/a
Kampong Tasek Lama	702	—N/a
Kampong Pusar Ulak	1,187	—N/a
Kampong Tungkadeh (Note: Also known as Mabohai)	924	—N/a
Kampong Kumbang Pasang (Note: Kumbang Pasang was formerly a mukim during the reign of Sultan Omar Ali Saifuddien III but it was eventually subsumed under the present mukim during the reign of the current Sultan of Brunei, Sultan Hassanal Bolkiah.)	661	—N/a
Kampong Parit (Note: Also known as Batu Satu) (Note: Not to be confused with the villages of the same name in Mukim Pengkalan Batu, and Mukim Amo in Temburong District)	1,424	—N/a
Kampong Tumasek	733	—N/a
Kampong Melabau	296	—N/a
Diplomatic Enclave Area	77	—N/a
