= Kampong Berangan =

Neighbourhood in Bandar Seri Begawan

- Neighbourhood and village
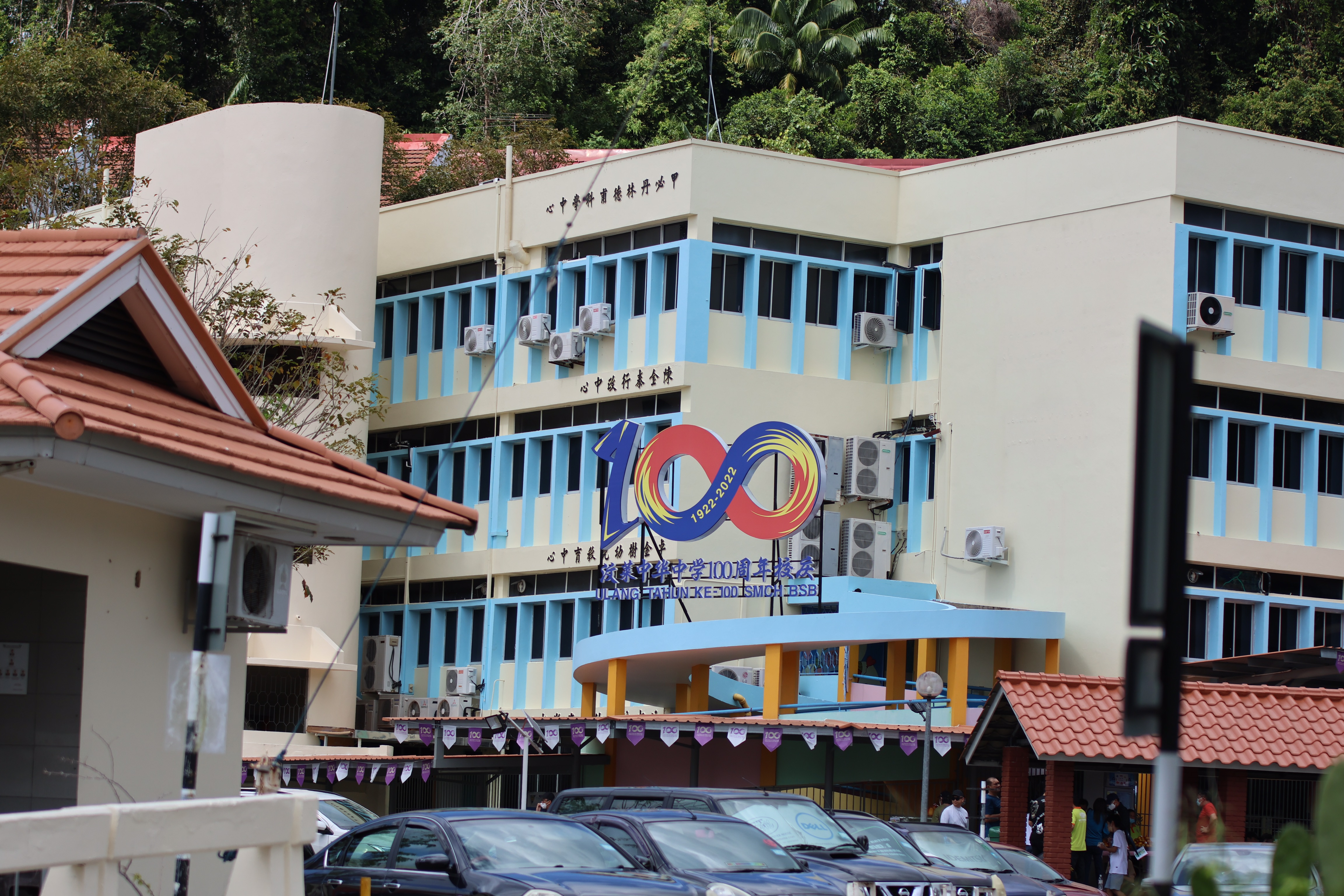
- Chung Hwa Middle School

- Location in Brunei
- Coordinates: 4°53′42″N 114°56′45″E
- Country: Brunei
- District: Brunei-Muara
- Mukim: Kianggeh

Population (2016)
  - Total: 379
- Time zone: UTC+8 (BNT)
- Postcode: BA1111

Kampong Berangan is a neighbourhood in Bandar Seri Begawan, the capital of Brunei. It is also a village in Brunei-Muara District, within Mukim Kianggeh. The population was 379 in 2016. It has the postcode BA1111.
