= Sultan Haji Hassanal Bolkiah Silver Jubilee Park =

Park in Bandar Seri Begawan, Brunei

- Taman Jubli Perak; Sultan Haji Hassanal Bolkiah
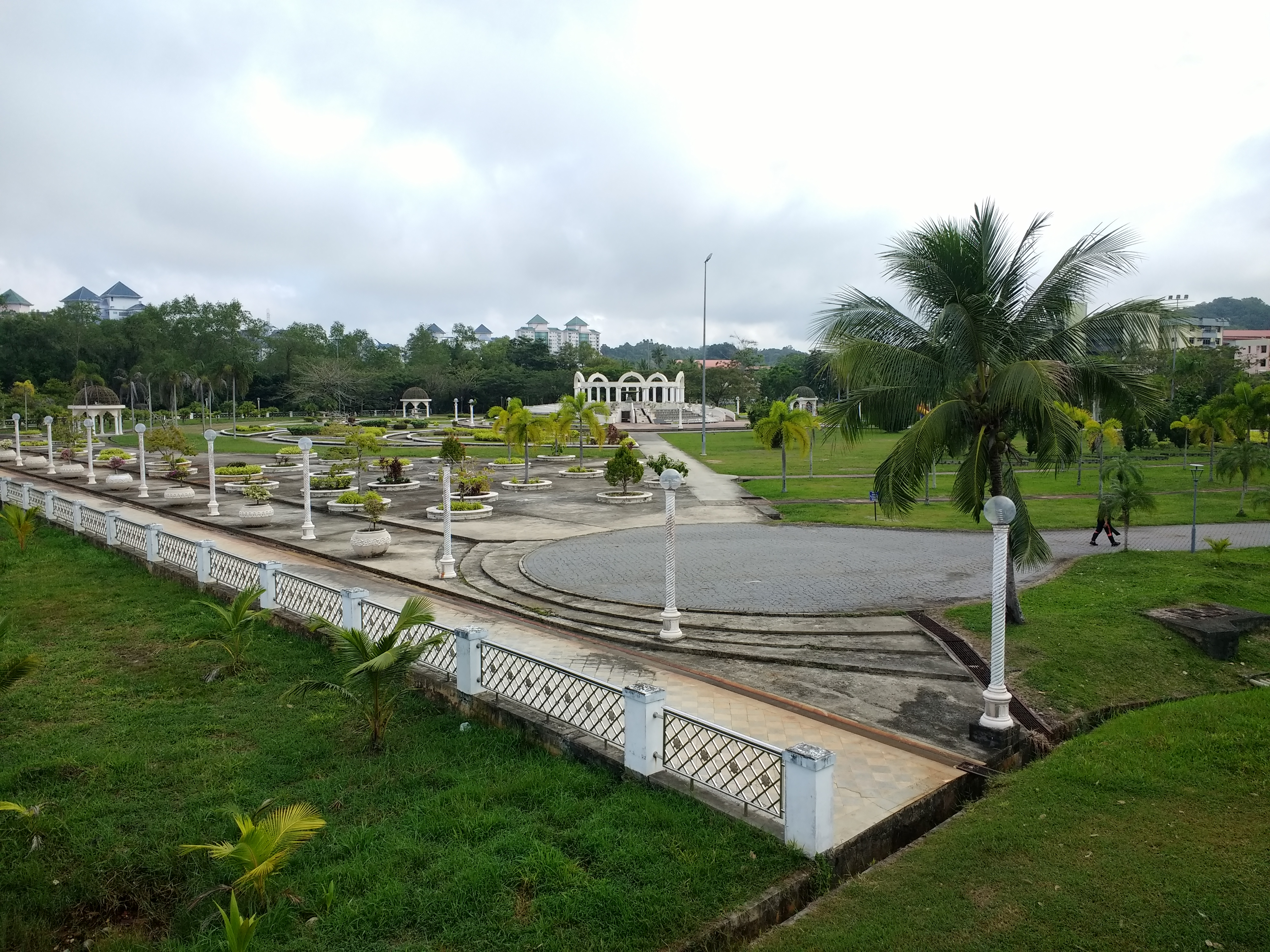
- The park in 2019
- Interactive map of Sultan Haji Hassanal Bolkiah; Silver Jubilee Park
- Type: Public park
- Location: Kampong Tungkadeh, Bandar Seri Begawan, Brunei
- Coordinates: 4°53′56″N 114°56′05″E
- Area: 5 hectares (12 acres)
- Opened: 2004
- Etymology: Silver Jubilee of Hassanal Bolkiah
- Manager: Department of Environment, Parks and Recreation (Note: The Ministry of Development's Department of Environment, Parks, and Recreation is in charge of overseeing the nation's recreational areas' upkeep and landscaping.)

The Sultan Haji Hassanal Bolkiah Silver Jubilee Park (Malay: Taman Jubli Perak Sultan Haji Hassanal Bolkiah) is a public park located along the banks of the Kedayan River, near the Sultan Omar Ali Saifuddien College field and the road leading to the Kiulap commercial area in Bandar Seri Begawan, Brunei. The park, which covers 5 hectares (12 acres) in Kampong Tungkadeh, was created to mark the silver jubilee of Sultan Hassanal Bolkiah's accession to the throne. It is a long-term donation from the citizens of the Muara District of Brunei. At first, the park included just a fountain and a statue. It has since been transformed into a leisure space with jogging paths and a playground for kids.

== History ==
The Sultan Haji Hassanal Bolkiah Silver Jubilee Park was built around 2004. Originally, the park only featured a monument and a fountain. Today, in addition to the monument and fountain, the area has been developed into a recreational space with a jogging track and is also equipped with various facilities, such as a children's playground and parking spaces.
