= Brunei History Centre =

Bruneian historical research institution

- Pusat Sejarah Brunei ڤوست سجاره بروني

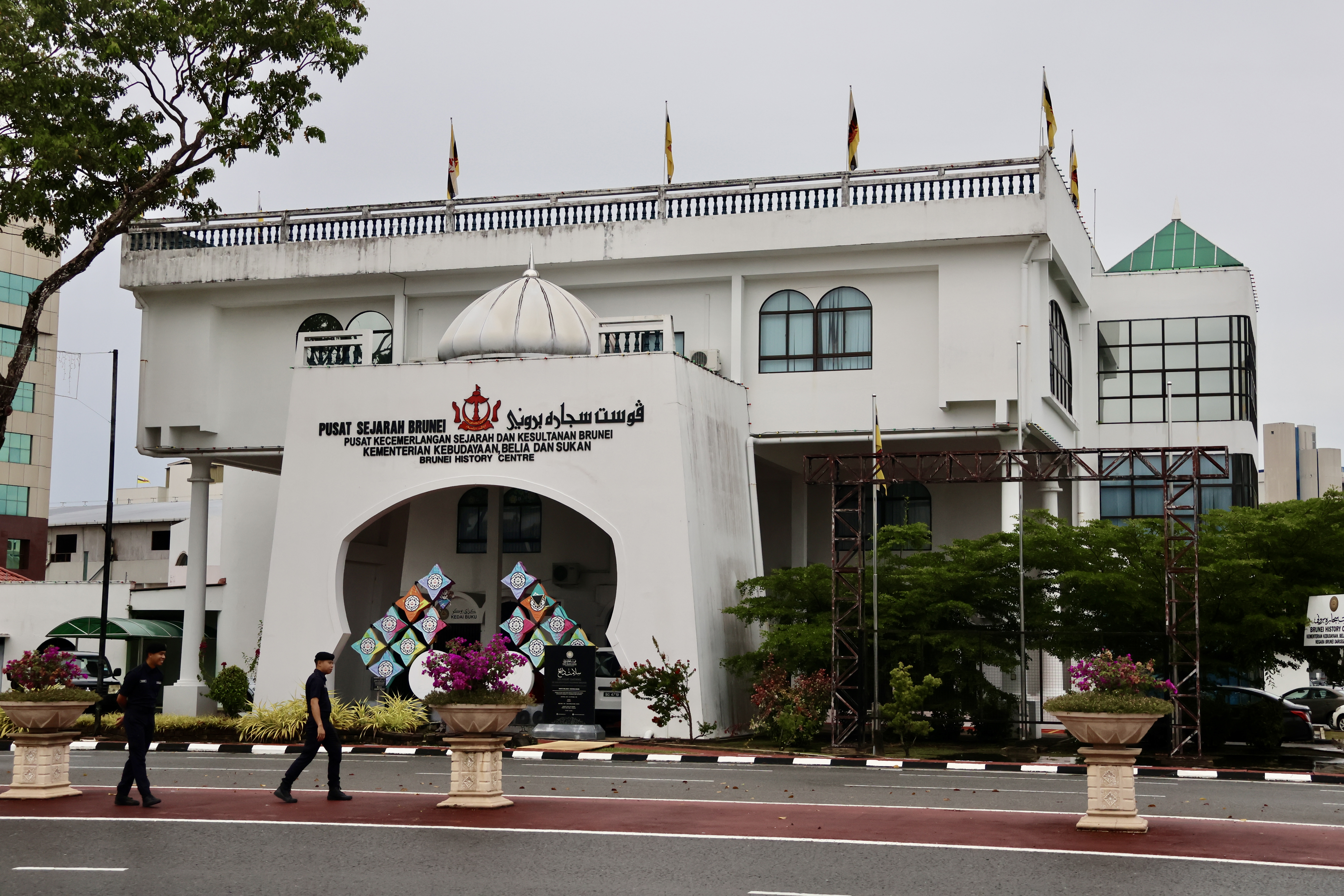
- Brunei History Centre in Pusat Bandar, Brunei

Department overview
- Formed: 26 January 1982; 43 years ago
- Jurisdiction: Government of Brunei
- Headquarters: Jalan James Pearce, Bandar Seri Begawan, Brunei BS8610; 4°53′30.6″N 114°56′30.0″E
- Minister responsible: Nazmi Mohamad, Minister of Culture, Youth and Sports
- Department executive: Hadi Melayong, Principal
- Parent department: Ministry of Culture, Youth and Sports
- Website: www.pusat-sejarah.gov.bn

The Brunei History Centre (PSB; Malay: Pusat Sejarah Brunei) is a government institution which conducts research, documentation, publication and dissemination on matters pertaining to the history of Brunei. It was established in 1982 by the consent of Sultan Hassanal Bolkiah as an institute of historical research on Brunei for the benefit of the Bruneian people.

== History ==
On 25 January 1982, the Brunei History Centre's building at Jalan Stoney, Bandar Seri Begawan, was officially opened. Afterwards, on 26 January 1982, the Brunei History Center was established with Sultan Hassanal Bolkiah's approval by a Memorandum of the Menteri Besar of Brunei, Number: SUK.06/84/92, dated 26 January 1982. The purpose of the centre is to conduct research and dissemination on the history of Brunei for the benefit of the people in the country. Initially, the Centre was housed in the main branch of the Dewan Bahasa dan Pustaka Library at Jalan Elizabeth II, Bandar Seri Begawan. In 1985, it was moved to the building at Jalan Stoney which was formerly the then Department of Education (Malay: Jabatan Pelajaran). In 1988, the Centre finally moved to the present building at Jalan James Pearce.

== Archives ==
Since its founding in 1982, the Brunei History Centre's Archives Division has been an essential research and reference resource for the public and government organisations. Its goal is to gather, arrange, and preserve historical and informational items, including official publications, government documents, historical photographs, manuscripts, and local newspapers. Valuable papers are made public after 25 years, and records are meticulously sorted and kept in a controlled atmosphere. To preserve materials, preservation methods include binding, microfilming, and fumigation. In order to increase the size of its collection on Brunei's history, the division also works with foreign archive organisations.

== Library ==
In 1982, the Brunei History Centre Library was founded together with the History Centre Department, which subsequently became part of the Archives Division. The appointment of a senior library officer in 1984 marked the beginning of the library's official management, although cataloging, categorising, and methodically organising the collection started soon after. By purchasing literature published both domestically and abroad, the library sought to broaden its selection. The library's move to a new facility in July 1987 allowed for a more organised setting, with the Library Division placed on the ground level, apart from the Archives Division.

The library primarily serves as an internal library, offering reference materials only to officers and personnel. However, with prior permission from the principal, access may be granted to outside scholars. Only department employees may borrow materials for work-related study; all other materials are solely for in-library use. Historical literature covering national, cultural, and economic history, especially as it relates to Brunei, Southeast Asia, and beyond, is the main emphasis of the library's collection. It provides thorough access to essential historical knowledge by containing a wide range of materials, including books, journals, magazines, pamphlets, newspapers, and manuscripts, all of which are methodically arranged into categories like Brunei Reference, Southeast Asia Reference, and General Reference.

== Principals ==
The head of Brunei History Centre is a Principal (Pengetua), which was held by Jamil Al-Sufri until his death on 4 March 2021. The current Principal of Brunei History Centre is Dr. Hadi Melayong, another well known historian and long time deputy and acting Principal of Brunei History Centre. It is a government department under the Ministry of Culture, Youth and Sports.

No.	Portrait	Name	Term of office		Ref
No.	Portrait	Name	Took office	Left office	Ref
1		Jamil Al-Sufri	26 January 1982	4 March 2021	
2		Hadi Melayong	4 March 2021	present	

== Gallery ==
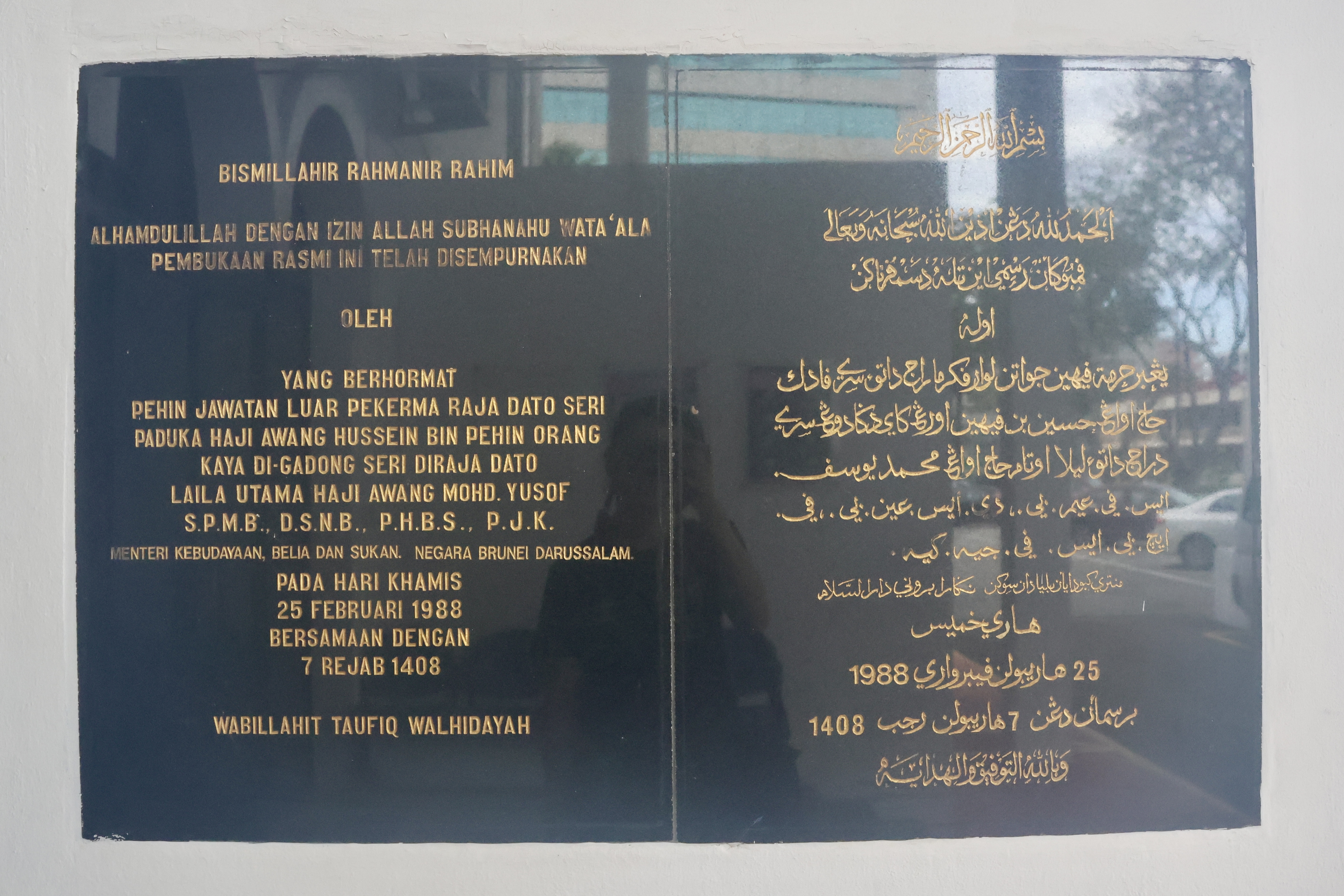
The building's inauguration plaque

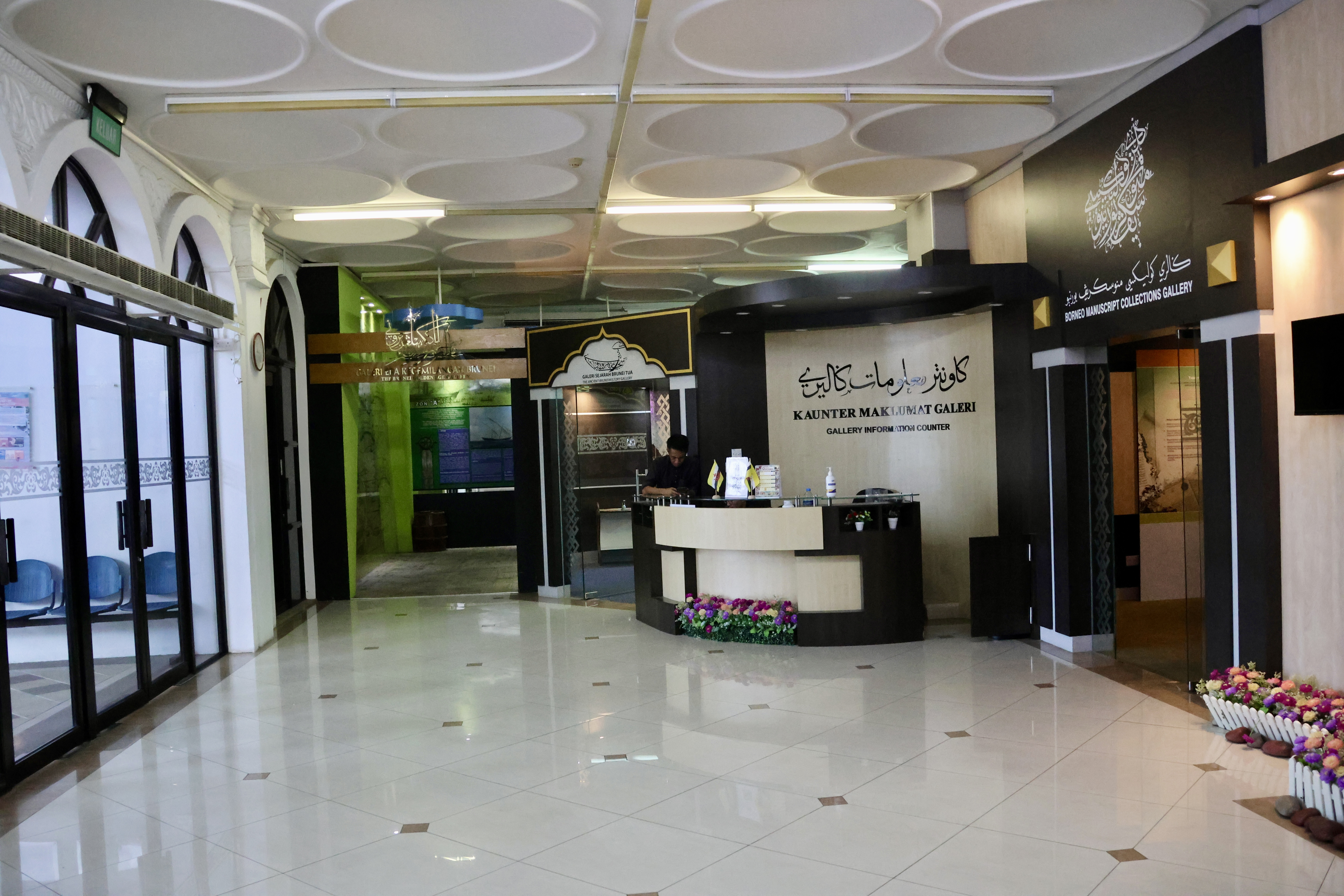
The main entrance

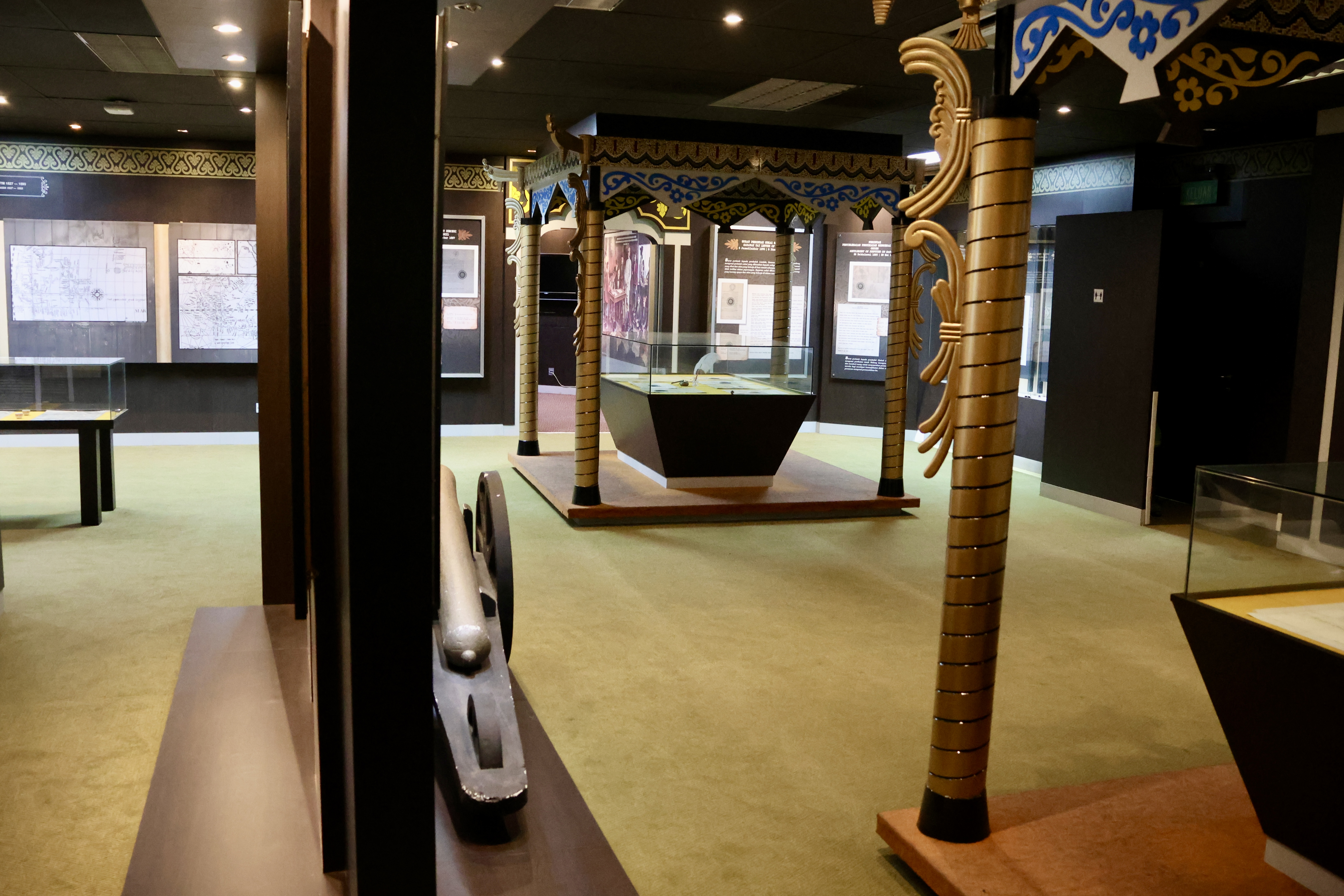
Borneo Manuscript Collection Gallery

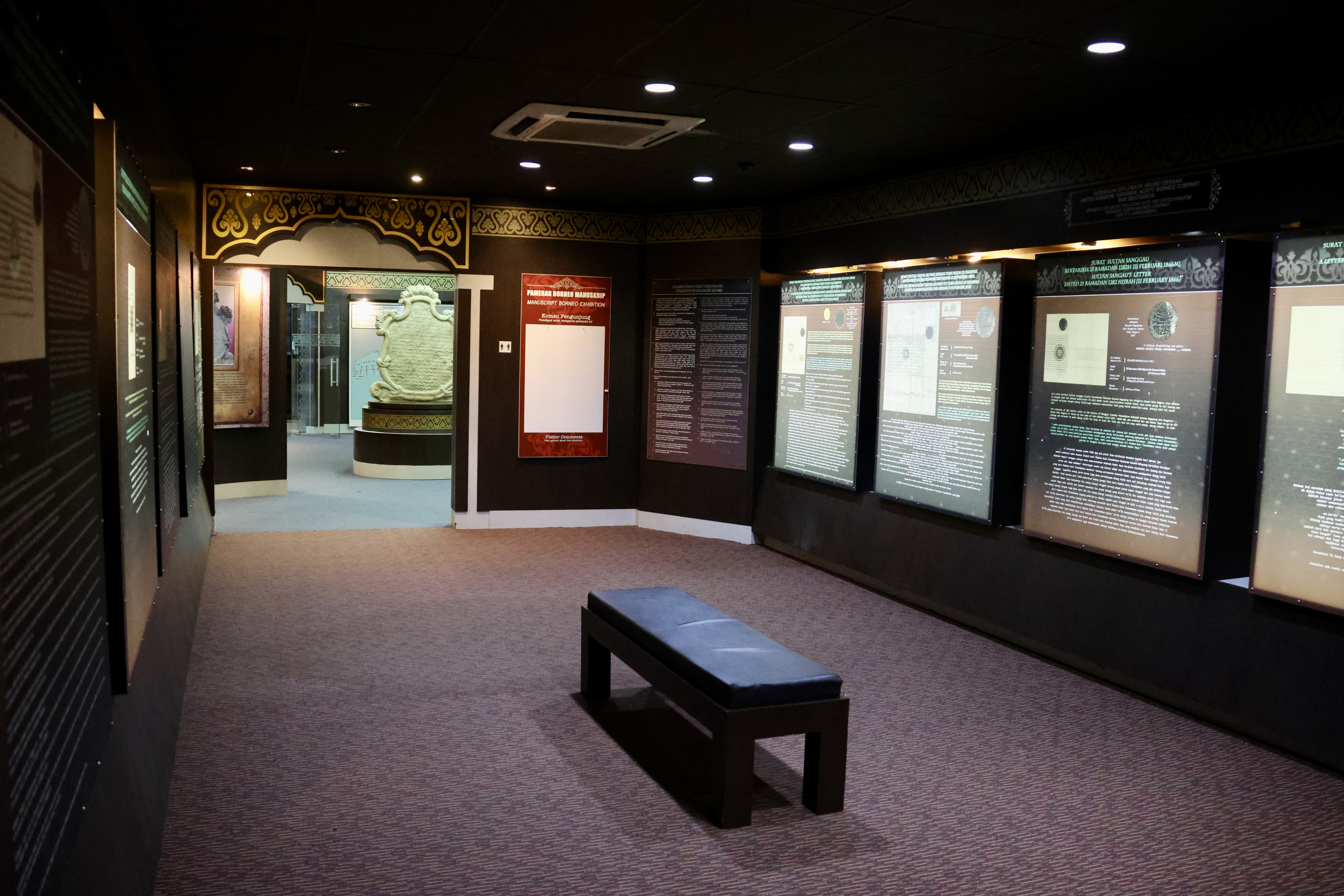
Borneo Manuscript Collection Gallery

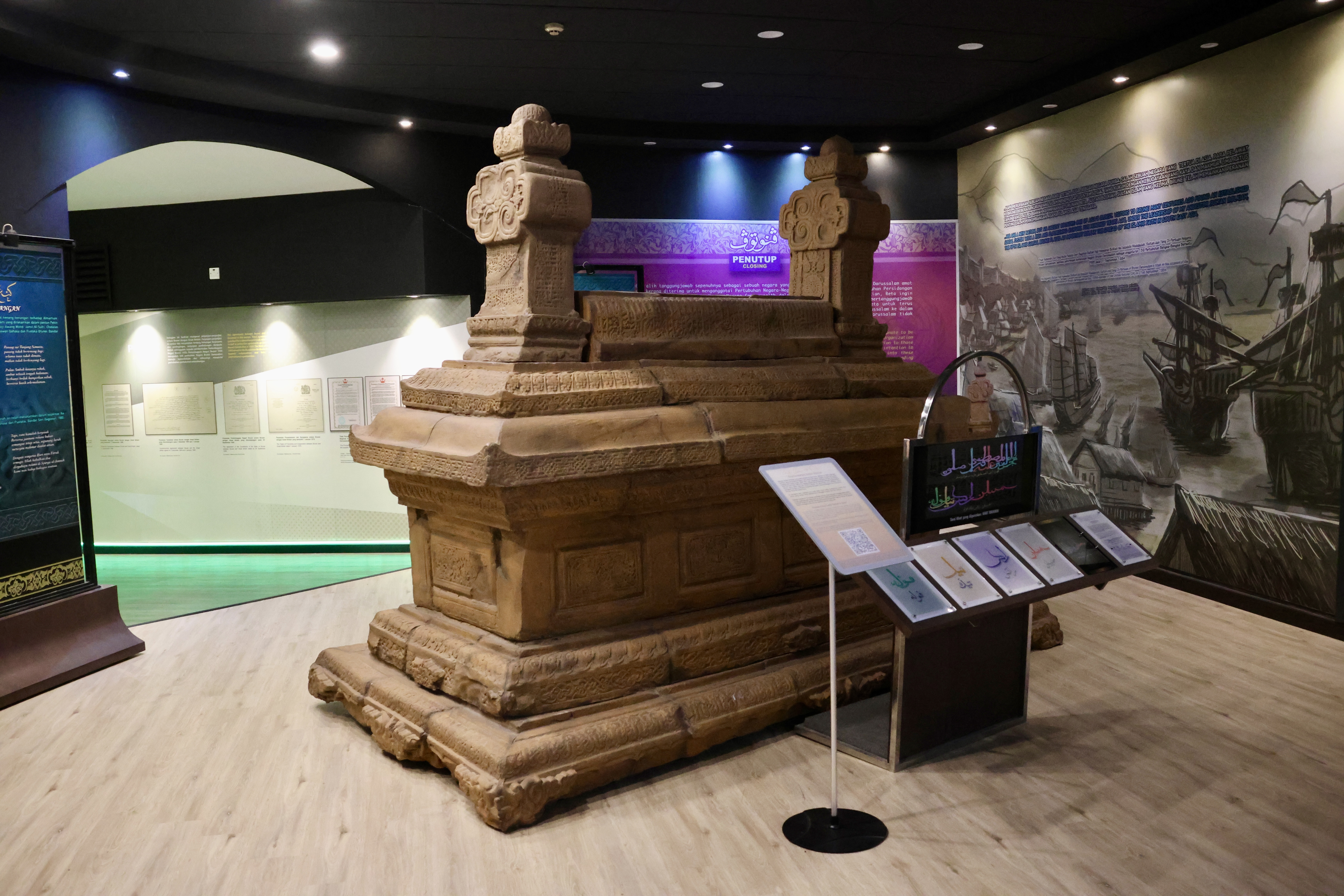
Tomb of Sultan Bolkiah replica

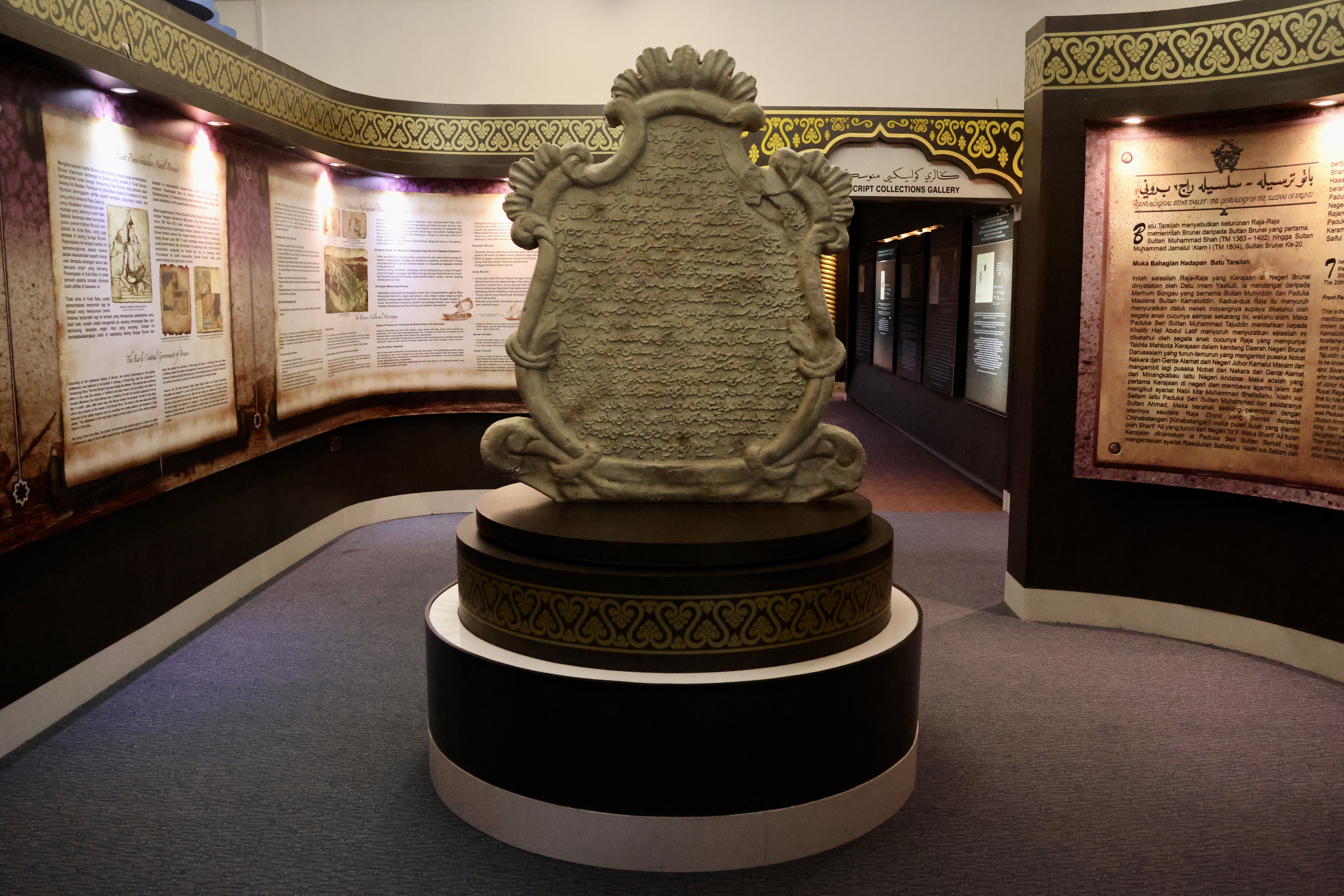
Batu Tarsilah replica

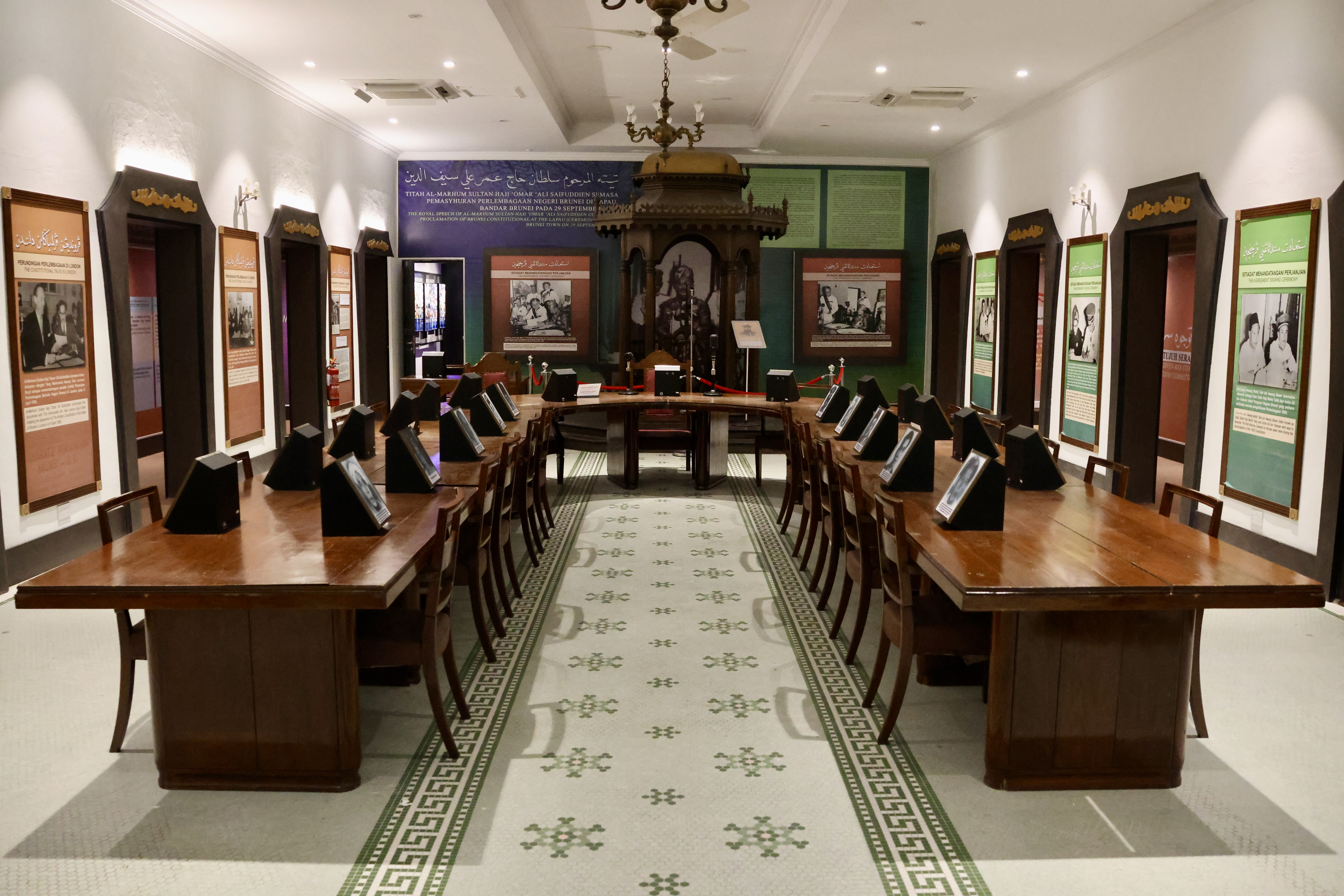
The 1959 Brunei Constitution Gallery

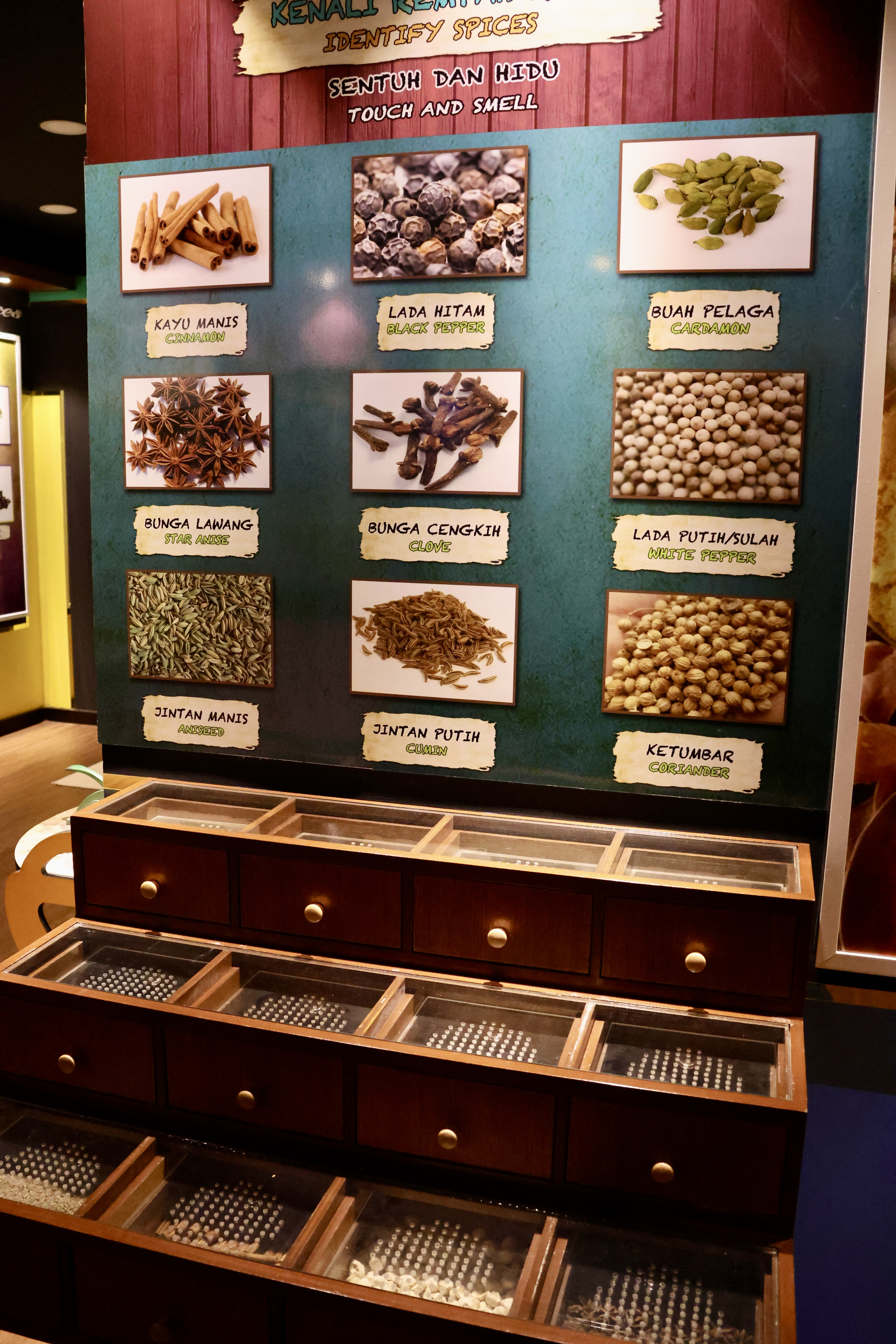
Hundred Spices Room

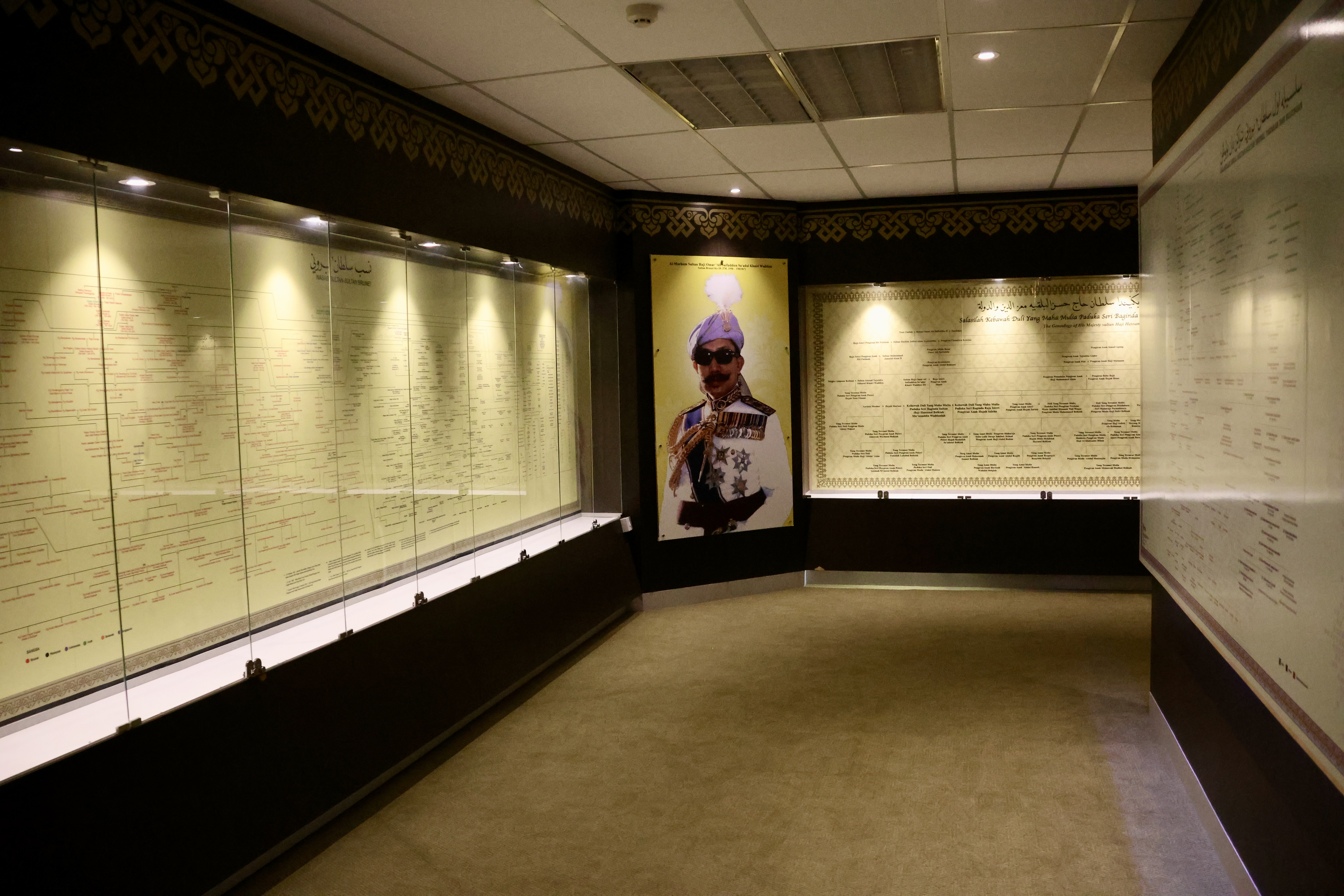
The Genealogy Gallery
