= Tungkadeh =

Kampong Tungkadeh Kampung Tungkadeh
- Neighbourhood and village
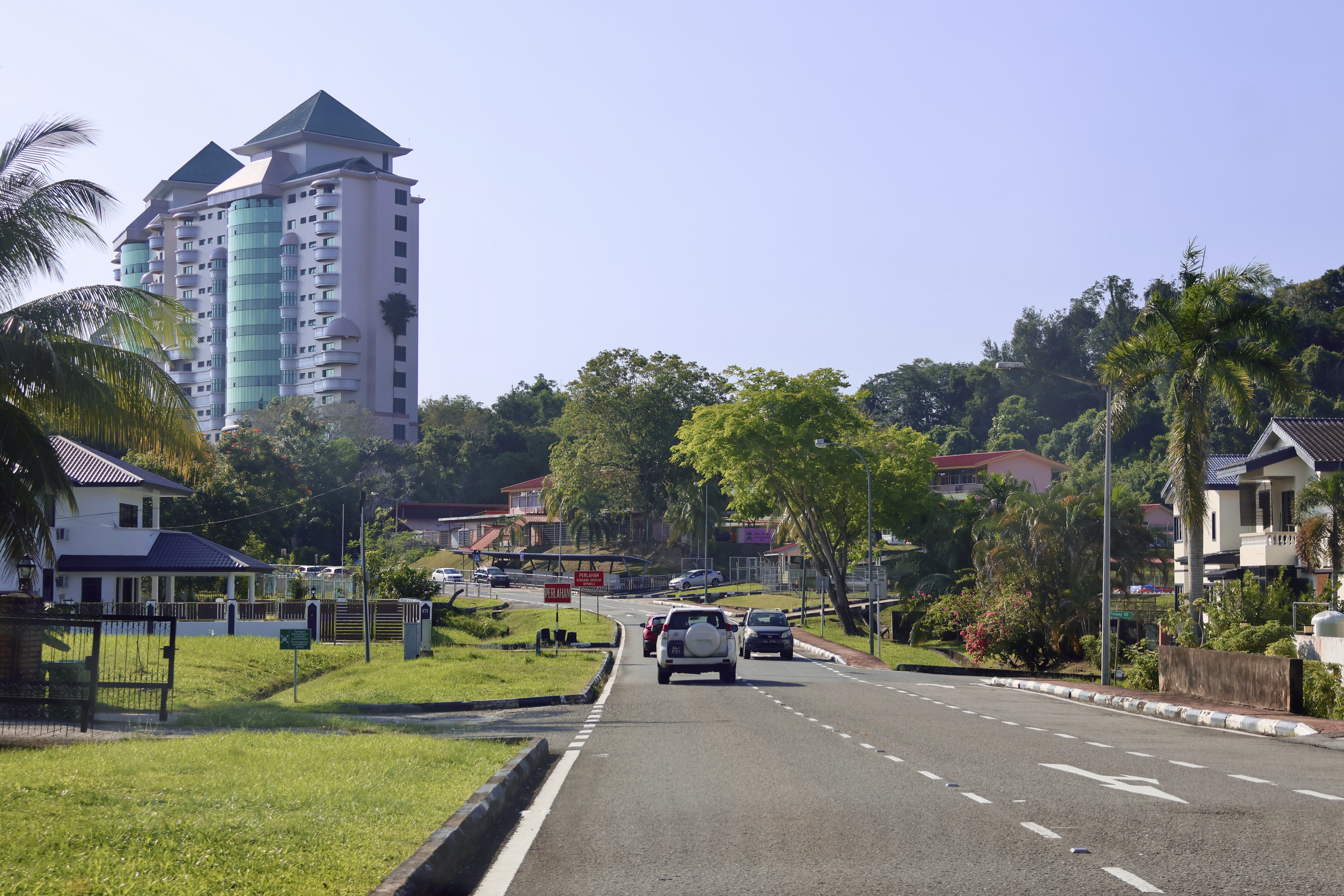
- Jalan Jawatan Dalam

- Location in Brunei
- Coordinates: 4°54′15″N 114°56′18″E
- Country: Brunei
- District: Brunei-Muara
- Mukim: Kianggeh

Government
  - Village head: Lawi Lamat
- Postcode: BA1111, BA1311

Tungkadeh, commonly known as Mabohai, is a small neighbourhood in Bandar Seri Begawan, the capital of Brunei. It is officially a village subdivision under Kianggeh, a mukim (subdistrict) of Brunei-Muara District. The postcodes for Tungkadeh are BA1111 and BA1311.

== Etymology ==
As a village subdivision, Tungkadeh is officially known in Malay as Kampung Tungkadeh (Kampung is sometimes spelt as Kampong), which literally means 'Tungkadeh Village'.

== History ==
A vast 150 acres (61 ha) region was covered by Melabau communities, which included villages such as Kampong Melabau and Kampong Berakas. Smaller villages including Baduk Sijanum, Bukit Galang-Galang, Sibukak, Pulaie, and a few more eventually joined the Melabau landscape, albeit many of them are now extinct. The Melabau people were able to establish a strong, cohesive society because of this large region.

== Infrastructure ==
Mabohai Primary School, located on Jalan Jawatan Dalam, primarily serves students from nearby areas such as Mabohai, Jalan Ong Sum Ping, Jalan Kumbang Pasang, and its vicinity. The school building was constructed in 1977 and officially opened in 1978 by Bahar bin Ahmad, the then headmaster. Initially known as Mabohai English Preparatory School until 1986, the school also operated temporarily at Sultan Omar Ali Saifuddien College's field due to its large enrolment of 2,100 students, excluding branches in various locations, bringing the total enrolment to 3,500. From 1985 to 1986, it was renamed Government Primary School before finally adopting its current name for morning sessions, while operating as Mabohai Religious School in the afternoon.

== Notable people ==
- Jamil Al-Sufri (1921–2021), a historian and politician
- Yasmin Umar (born 1956), a politician and military officer
- Pengiran Anak Siti Saerah (1928–2013), daughter of Sultan Ahmad Tajuddin

== See also ==
- List of neighbourhoods in Bandar Seri Begawan
