= Diplomatic Enclave, Brunei =

Village in Brunei

Diplomatic Enclave Kawasan Lingkungan Diplomatik کاوسن لڠکوڠن ديڤلوماتيک
- Neighbourhood
- Diplomatic Enclave Area
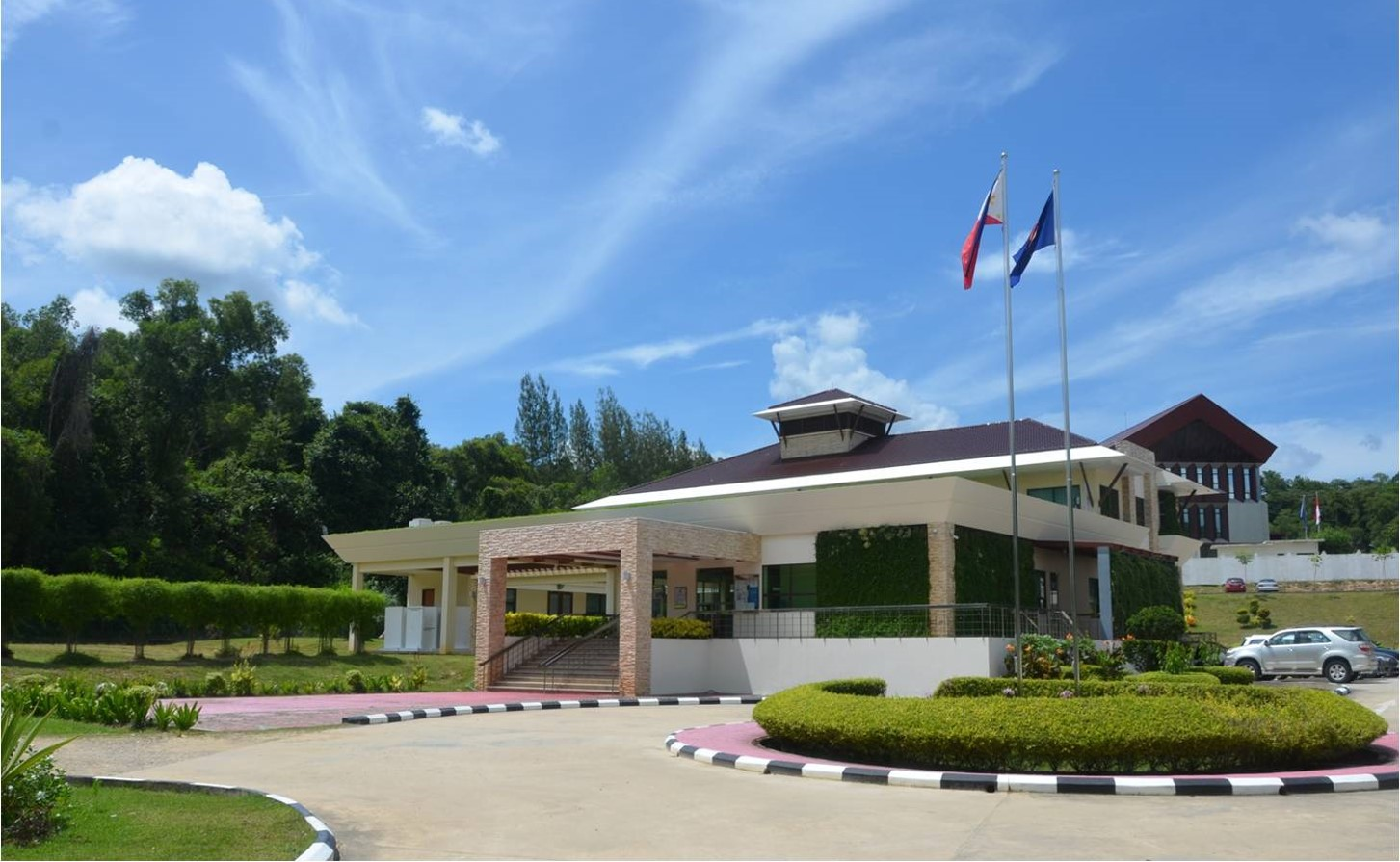
- Embassy of the Philippines

- Location in Brunei
- Coordinates: 4°55′21″N 114°57′43″E
- Country: Brunei
- District: Brunei-Muara
- Mukim: Kianggeh

Area
  - Total: 3.362 km^{2} (1.298 sq mi)

Population (2016)
  - Total: 85
  - Density: 25/km^{2} (65/sq mi)
- Time zone: UTC+8 (BNT)
- Postcode: BA2313

Diplomatic Enclave Area (Malay: Kawasan Lingkungan Diplomatik) is a neighbourhood in Brunei-Muara District, Brunei, as well as the capital Bandar Seri Begawan. The population was 85 in 2016. It is one of the villages within Mukim Kianggeh. The postcode is BA2313.

== Infrastructures ==
- Embassy of the Philippines
- Embassy of the United States
- Embassy of China
- Embassy of Laos
- Embassy of Cambodia
- Embassy of South Korea
- Embassy of Indonesia
- Malaysian High Commission

== See also ==
- List of neighbourhoods in Bandar Seri Begawan
