= Ahmad Morshidi =

Bruneian businessman and politician (born 1956)

Ahmad Morshidi SMB PSB
- احمد مورشيد

Member of the Legislative Council
- In office 1 June 2011 – 11 February 2015

Personal details
- Born: 24 January 1956 (age 70) Brunei
- Parent: Abdul Rahman Taha (father)
- Occupation: Politician; businessman

Ahmad Morshidi bin Haji Abdul Rahman (born 24 January 1956) is a Bruneian businessman and politician who became a member of the Brunei Legislative Council (LegCo) from 2011 to 2015.

== Early life and education ==
Abdul Morshidi was born in Brunei on 24 January 1956, to Pehin Orang Kaya Digadong Dato Laila Utama Haji Abdul Rahman, a prominent aristocrat. He has two brothers, Mohammad Hanafi, the founder of Hanafi Konsaltan, and Mohammad Mahdi, a diplomat. He pursued his education in the United Kingdom, where he earned a diploma in business studies.

== Business career ==
Abdul Morshidi went on to work in a number of private sector companies, such as Ideal Multifeed Farm (Brunei), Gadong Properties, Brunei Times, CfBT Education Services, and IDS Borneo, as a chairman, managing director, and director. In addition, he belongs to a number of non-governmental organisations (NGOs), including the Brunei Darussalam International Chamber of Commerce & Industry, the Inquiry Panel of the Law Society of Brunei Darussalam, the Brunei Economic Development Board (BEDB), International School Brunei, the Brunei-China Friendship Association, and the Brunei Pakistan Friendship Association.

== Political career ==
In addition to being a member of the Brunei Darussalam delegation to the 32nd ASEAN Inter-Parliamentary Assembly in Cambodia in September 2011, the Asian Parliamentary Assembly in October 2011, the International Conference of Principles of Friendship and Cooperation in Asia, and the Ad-Hoc Committee Meeting on Protection of the Rights of Migrant Workers from 28 to 29 September in Solo, Indonesia, He was appointed as a Member of the LegCo on 1 June 2011.

On 7 March 2015, Abdul Morshidi noted at a LegCo meeting that work opportunities for local children should be addressed and put into action right away because, in order to meet the objectives of Wawasan 2035, the state, the nation, and religion depend on the knowledgeable and competent human resources of the local youth as their primary source of development. He also pointed out that in order to steer the public service in a more bright path, it is crucial that every person adopt a new "mindset" and attitude. According to him, maintaining the public sector only needs a mindset that is always positive, focused on stability, and forward-thinking in order to create economic growth.

At another LegCo meeting on the 23rd, he was in favour of more robust strategies for ending poverty that are managed through the use of score cards, which track progress and serve as proud role models for others to follow in escaping poverty. He added that the crisis of declining oil prices had happened three or four times before the drop in prices that occurred in 2014, the most recent year of decrease.

== Honours ==
Ahmad Morshidi has been bestowed the following honours:

- Order of Seri Paduka Mahkota Brunei Third Class (SMB)
- Order of Setia Negara Brunei Fourth Class (PSB)
