= Mosques in Brunei =

Mosques in Brunei have been built by the Government of Brunei. The Ministry of Religious Affairs' Department of Mosque Affairs oversees all mosques in Brunei. As of 2019, Brunei's government has constructed more than 102 masjid (mosques), 5 surau and 11 balai ibadat (worship halls). These mosques are used for more than just prayer; they are also used for communal and religious events including Quran readings, religious lectures, and Shukr dinners.

== Background ==
Mosques in Brunei may be divided into three categories: national mosques, main mosques, and village mosques. The Omar Ali Saifuddien Mosque (SOAS Mosque) and the Jame' Asr Hassanil Bolkiah Mosque (JAHB Mosque) are the two state mosques. Setia Ali Mosque in Serasa and Mohammad Jamalul Alam Mosque in Kuala Belait are examples of main mosques, or mukim mosques, that serve as important religious hubs in each district and can hold up to 2000 people. Village mosques are smaller, located in villages, and have a capacity of about 1000 worshippers. Examples of these mosques include Mohamed Bolkiah in Serusop and Sultan Sharif Ali Mosque in Sengkurong.

Mosque architecture in Brunei reflects the monarchy's fusion of Malay cultural identity with Islamic governance, serving both religious and cultural purposes. Lower-class municipal and village mosques are inspired by traditional Malay vernacular design, while national and principal mosques integrate Arabic and South Asian elements with Malay symbolism. This design hierarchy mirrors the mosques' status, with higher-ranking mosques associated with the state and lower-ranking ones reflecting local environments. The concept of Melayu Islam Beraja (MIB) architecture, though formally established later, has roots in the designs from Sultan Omar Ali Saifuddien III's reign and continues to influence modern architecture. Bruneian Malay architectural styles are governed by the interplay of Adat Istiadat Diraja (Royal Customs), Sharia (Islamic law), and Adat Istiadat Melayu (Malay Customs), with Islamic law dominating and shaping designs to embody Islamic values, Malay culture, and royal symbols. Mosques play a crucial role in ensuring these elements are integrated into the legal and cultural framework of the nation.

== Architectural history ==
=== Early history ===
Sultan Sharif Ali built the nation's first mosque at Kota Batu, known as Masjid Besar. In 1975, this early mosque was reported by researcher Robert Nicholl as being vast and elaborate, with gilding and half-relief, during Francisco de Sande's raid in 1578. Later in 2004, Pengiran Badarudin determined that Sultan Saiful Rijal constructed the mosque, which had a high hip-tiered roof with a pyramidal design influenced by Malay architecture. It had pillars set halfway up the walls to let light and air flow, along with a tower pillar made of solid black bulian wood and a bedok (drum) for announcements and prayer times. Arabic inscriptions and Quranic texts adorned the mosque's walls. On 23 June 1578, the Spaniards destroyed the mosque during the Castilian War. Mosques and balai ibadat with roofs made of nibong leaves had been constructed at Berakas, Subok, and Melabau by the 18th century, all using sturdy wood materials.

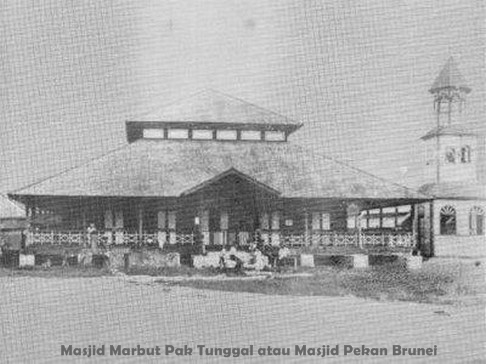
Masjid Marbut Pak Tunggal, early 20th century architecture in Brunei

Masjid Marbut (Pak) Tunggal, or Masjid Pekan Brunei, was constructed with a double asbestos roof and a minaret that was split into three-halves. It is the first mosque ever erected on land, was established on the present location of SOAS Mosque during the reign of Sultan Muhammad Jamalul Alam II. Its building was a combination of brick and wood. At the location of the current TAIB Building, Masjid Kajang was constructed under Sultan Ahmad Tajuddin. It was an oblong wooden mosque with nibong leaves covering it that could accommodate up to 500 people. The 1930s saw an increase in the building of mosques outside of Brunei Town, notably those at Jalan Gadong and Kampong Lambak, both of which were destroyed during World War II. Small village mosques were constructed in the 1950s and 1960s by the locals themselves, with official assistance later.

Mosques in Brunei were originally used as classrooms for pupils in 1914. However, when enrolment increased quickly, mosques stopped to be used as formal schools and the government built new facilities to house the growing number of pupils. In Kampong Sultan Lama, a mosque was constructed prior to World War II, but it was demolished during Japanese occupation of Brunei from 1941 to 1945.

Before the 1950s, Brunei's mosques were built from wood, bamboo, and palm leaves, featuring Malay vernacular architecture with wooden rooms on stilts and pyramidal roofs for ventilation. Usually higher than ordinary structures, the roofs had pinnacles on top. Veranda, another typical architectural element that reflected traditional Malay house, were also prevalent. These early mosques lacked domes and minarets, features that were common in mosques built in the 1950s when concrete was used, reflecting influences from Hindu and Buddhist architecture and the broader Malay world (Indonesia and the Malay Peninsula). These mosques frequently included attached covered spaces for Quran readings, religious instruction, and other group activities. These spaces were known locally as balai adat and were encircled by hypostyles.

=== Sultan Omar Ali Saifuddien III (1950–1967) ===
Sultan Omar Ali Saifuddien III's reign saw the growth of Bruneian contemporary mosque architecture typically combines Bruneian cultural expressions with Arabic and Indo-Islamic components, such as onion-shaped domes, Moroccan carved walls, and numerous arches. Many mosques combine traditional and vernacular architecture, using regional materials and ornamental aspects to preserve cultural identity, even while they are influenced by foreign forms. Even after restorations, older mosques from the 1950s and 1970s still display traditional building techniques appropriate for the region's environment.

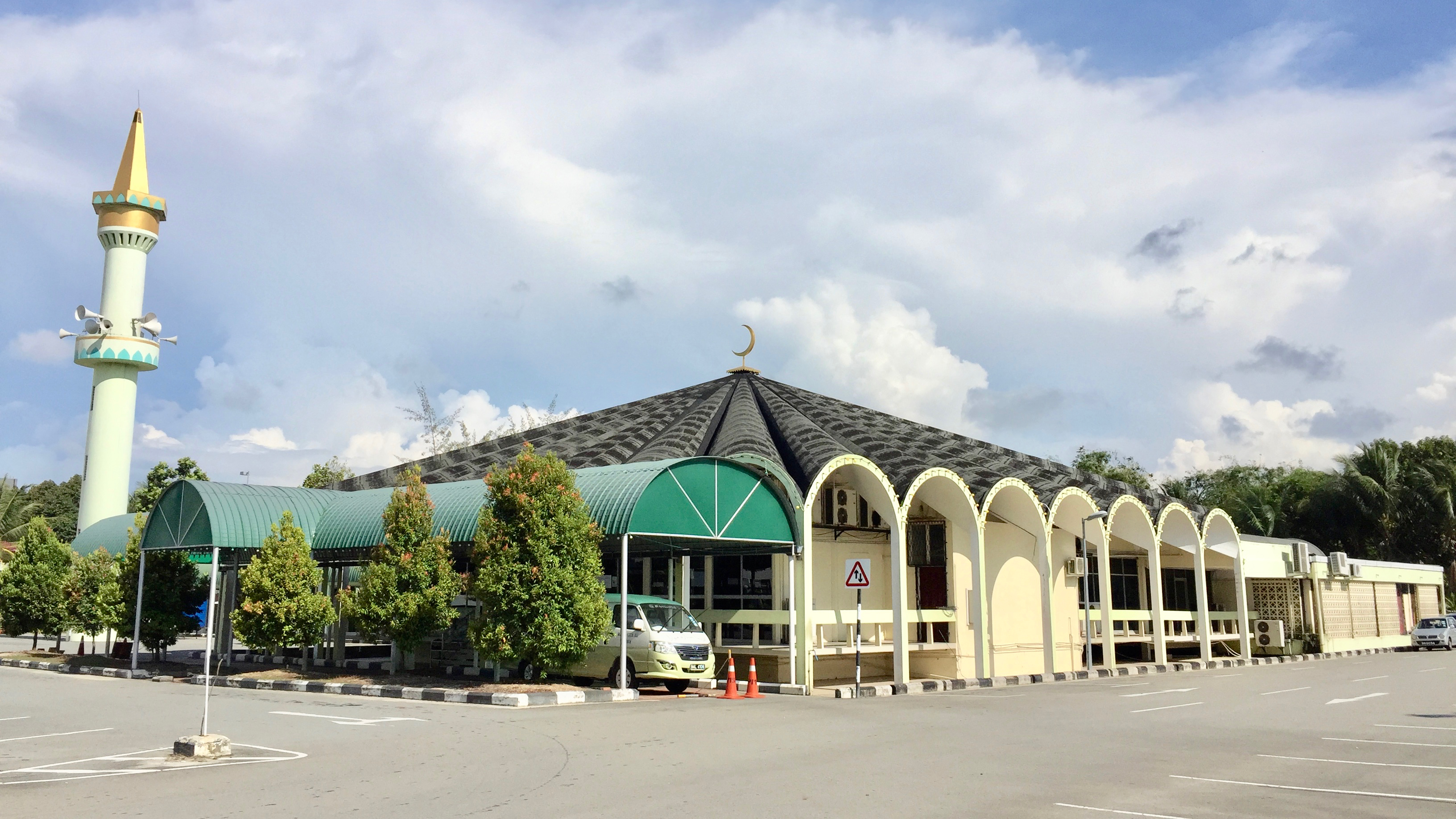
Setia Ali Mosque in 2018

The majority of Brunei's principal mosques were built between the 1950s and the late 1980s, in a style that was unique to Brunei and was designed by the Sultan. The Setia Ali Mosque in Serasa, erected in 1961, is one of the most notable mosques from this era. The mosque has a square hall that is erected on a stilt-supported platform and has a veranda surrounding it. The low conical roof, which is made up of semi-circular arch-vaults that converge at the peak and resemble an open umbrella, is its most distinctive feature. A notable architectural feature in Brunei and Malaysia at this time was the umbrella-shaped dome. Round or onion-shaped domes progressively replaced the conventional pyramidal Malay roofs in favour of the umbrella-shaped dome. During his reign, this architectural element became a defining characteristic of Brunei's mosque architecture, although it lost popularity following his death.

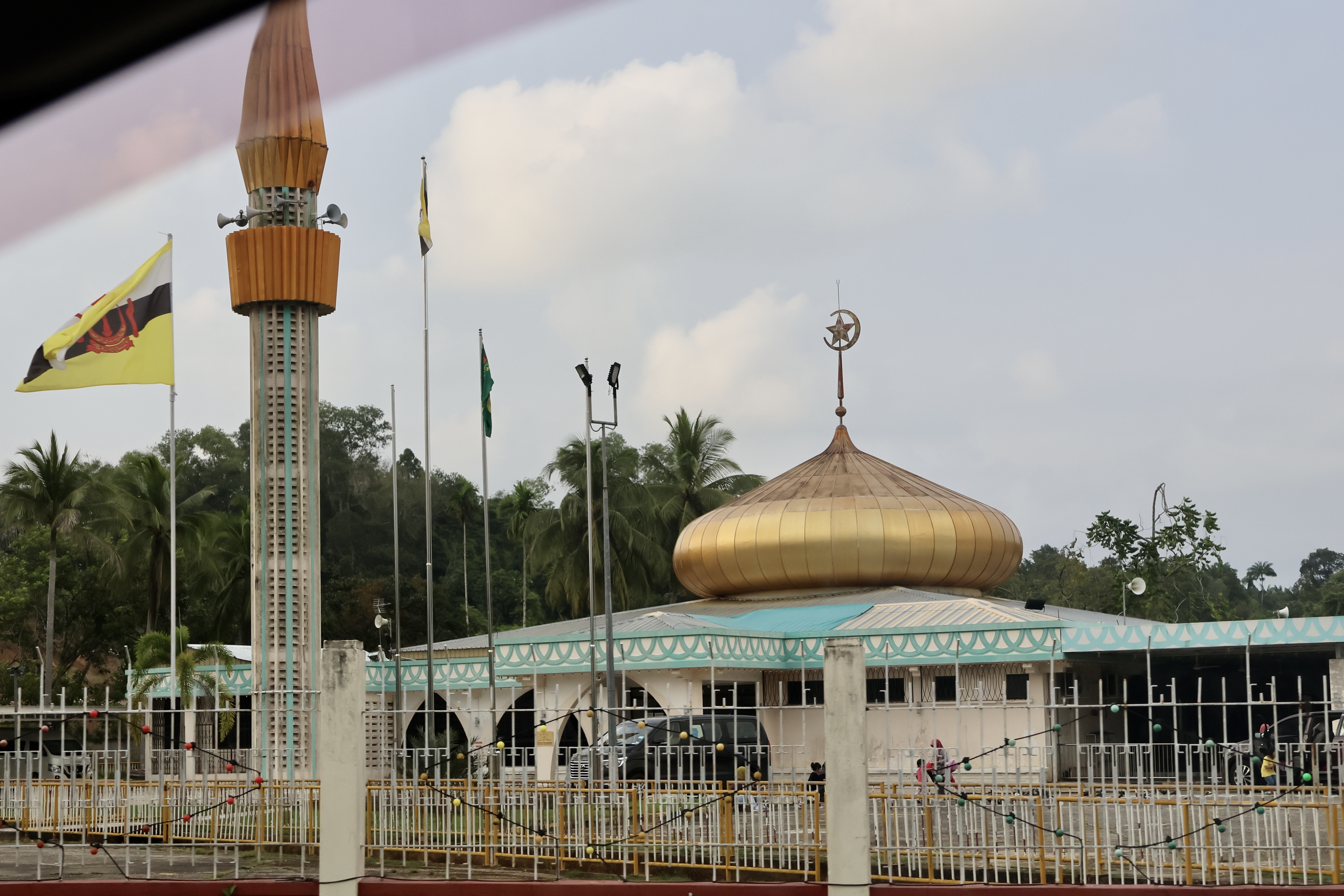
Hassanal Bolkiah Mosque in 2023

The mosques in Brunei have evolved architecturally, showcasing a smooth fusion of modernity and tradition. Certain traditional aspects, such the exposed interconnecting beam networks, were retained when mosque construction in Brunei shifted from timber constructions to masonry and stone. Originally intended to be structural, these beams were turned decorative, signifying the persistence of Malay architecture in contemporary mosque design. Particularly striking are the exposed beam networks seen in the Utama Mohammed Salleh Mosque in Temburong and the Hassanal Bolkiah Mosque in Tutong, which were finished in 1966 and 1968, respectively. These networks are evocative of mortise and tenon woodworking joints. Particularly at the major corners and other significant places, like the space between the main hall and the female prayer hall in the Mohamed Bolkiah Mosque, the beams in these mosques create visually beautiful patterns.

It is possible that the Payung Diraja or parasol (royal umbrella), an old emblem of Bruneian royalty, served as the model for the umbrella-shaped dome. This insignia, which is part of the Panji-panji national emblem, stands for justice, peace and tranquility, and regal honour. The royal umbrella has a rich cultural history and is customarily used to shield the Sultan during ceremonial events. Since 1868, Brunei pitis, have been adorned with the winged umbrella symbol. The design was also included on the one-cent piece that was distributed to commemorate the coronation of Golden Jubilee of Hassanal Bolkiah.

Some of Brunei's older timber mosques were rebuilt with masonry buildings under the Sultan's reign. These newer constructions were made of stronger materials and had a larger capacity. No historic timber mosques remain, in contrast to those in Malaysia and Indonesia, since they were either destroyed or demolished during the Japanese occupation and rebuilt with brick and concrete structures. The Antiquities and Treasure Trove Act of 1967 established Brunei's legislative framework for protecting its architectural history, classifying ancient monuments as those built before 1 January 1894. However, as of 2018, Brunei has just 27 structures and locations designated as historic monuments; none of them were mosques or the locations of former mosques.

=== Sultan Hassanal Bolkiah (1967–present) ===
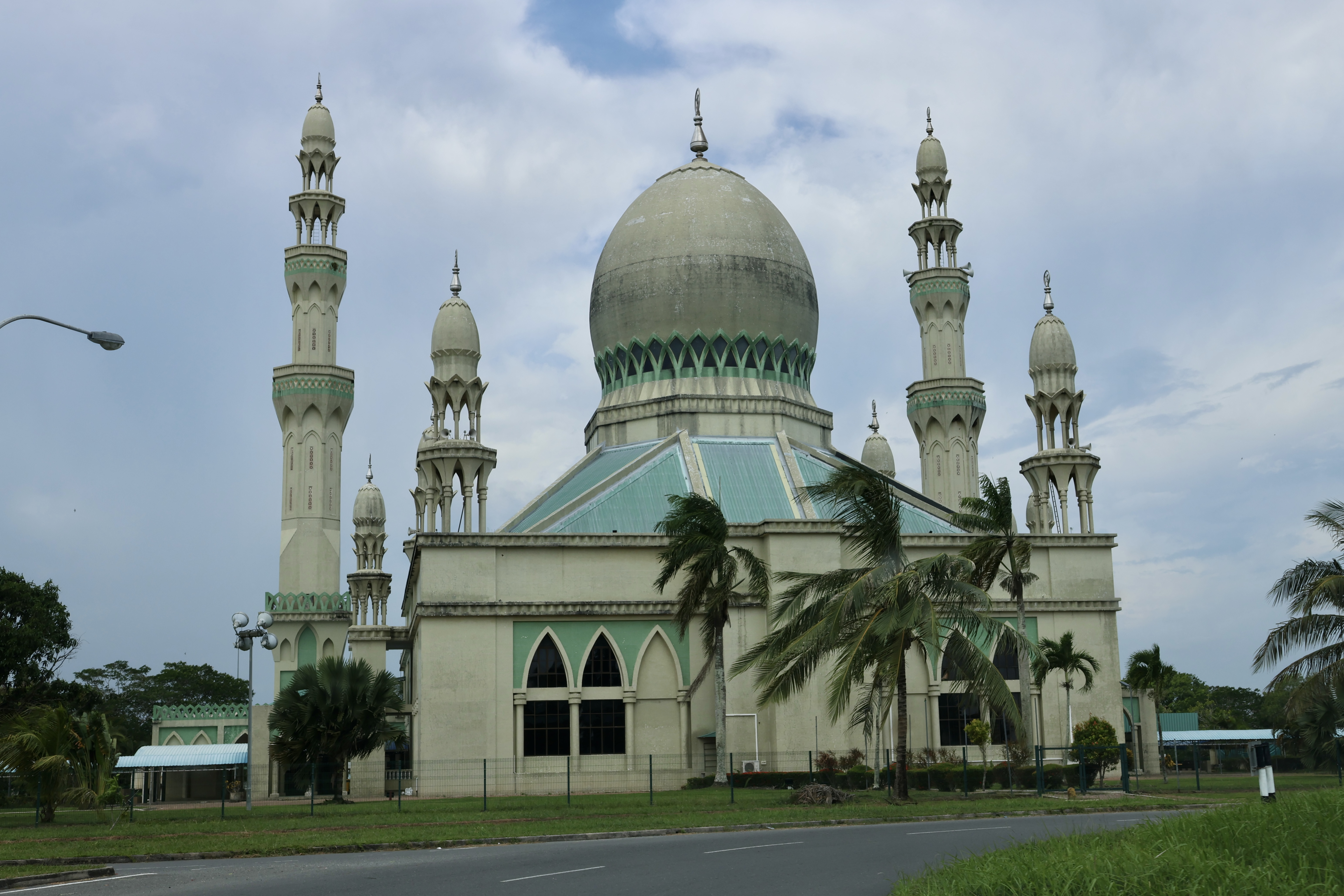
Kampong Pandan Mosque in 2023

Arabic architectural features, especially domes, were more prevalent in Brunei's mosque architecture under the rule of Sultan Hassanal Bolkiah. For instance, the architecture of the Kampong Pandan Mosque and the Perpindahan Lambak Kanan Mosque is similar, with two minarets that were influenced by Al-Masjid an-Nabawi, an oval-shaped dome, a pentagonal drum, and a central quadrangular plan. The Al-Ameerah Al-Hajjah Maryam Mosque, with its quadrangular hall, straight lines, round drum, and dome, is a prime example of traditional Arabic architecture. It has pointed horseshoe and onion-shaped arches, as well as elaborate embellishment with geometric designs and Islamic calligraphy. Because of their grandeur and cultural significance, the majority of mosques from this era are constructed using premium materials like marble, granite, and bronze. Brunei's mosques' fusion of traditional Malay and Arabic architectural forms highlights the country's commitment to conserving its cultural legacy while embracing modernity. The thoughtful blending of these components captures the dynamic character of Brunei's architecture, where the ancient and the modern dwell in harmony.

As of 2021, 24 municipal mosques in Brunei were constructed under the reign of the Sultan. These mosques are characterised by concrete pillars, floor designs that are quadrangular, and tiered pyramidal roofs. They frequently do not have domes and are built of simple materials. They frequently have areas designated for socioreligious events like weddings and Quran readings. Designed by Dato Idris Haji Abbas and finished in 1994, the Universiti Brunei Darussalam Mosque has a "vernacular Brunei architecture style" combining Islamic, Malay, and tropical elements. With a square main hall set on an elevated platform with an arched veranda, its design pays homage to the tropical environment and distinct cultural character of the area. Its three-tiered, pyramid-shaped roof is made of clay tiles and contains four windows on both sides between the base and middle levels. Two slightly raised towers with a lower pyramid canopy held up by four pillars flank the main entrance. The front gate is accessed by standalone balai adat on either side of the open corridor. These structures are embellished with geometric patterns and Rub el Hizb motifs made of beige, black, and pink tiles.

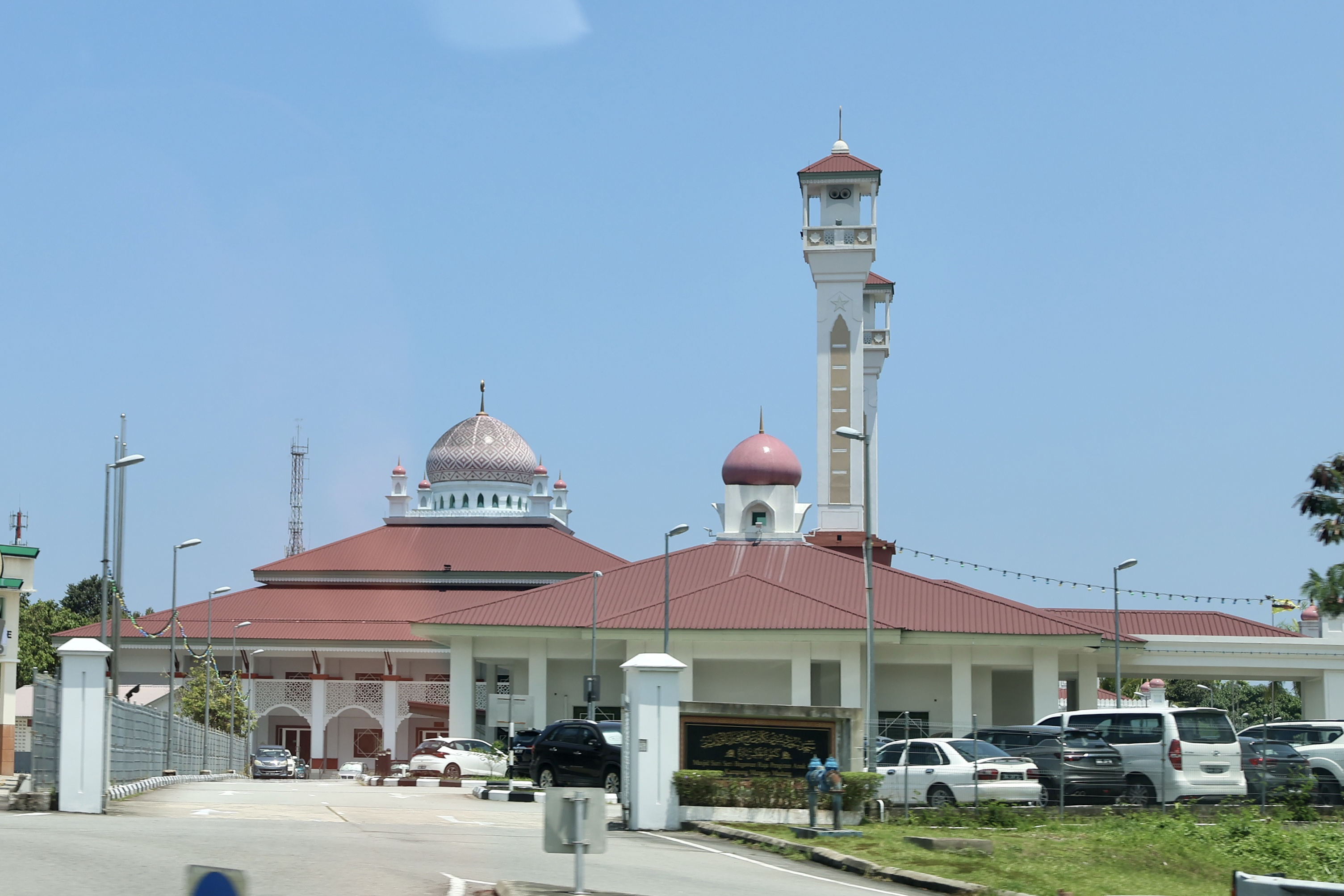
Suri Seri Begawan Raja Pengiran Anak Damit Mosque in 2023

When building the Suri Seri Begawan Raja Pengiran Anak Damit Mosque in Madang, architect Dato Idris Haji Abbas used a similar Malay Islamic vernacular style known as MIB architecture. The mosque was finished in 2014. This mosque has an extended multifunctional room that resembles a longhouse, a square floor plan, and a tiered pyramidal roof with a center round dome. The main entrance mimics the architecture of the UBD mosque with a lower canopy topped by a tiny dome. On the front corners, however, huge minarets have taken the place of the mosque's two little towers. Reflecting Brunei's architectural legacy, the interior has traditional Malay timber architecture components, such as decorative joineries and a shark-teeth motif on the fascia board.

The modular design of traditional Malay buildings, which has horizontal spatial hierarchies and connecting passageways that offer places for multiple activities including multipurpose rooms, libraries, and social spaces, is a common influence for mosques in Brunei. Municipal mosques created by Adnan Badarudin in 1995, such as Kampong Tamoi and Kampong Lumapas Mosques, and Duli Pengiran Muda Mahkota Pengiran Muda Haji Al-Muhtadee Billah Mosque, are examples of mosques that demonstrate this architectural philosophy. Usually, these mosques have extended roof sections that are attached to the main hall, and they have tiered pyramidal tile roofs. Islamic calligraphy, arabesques, ogee or horseshoe arches, and round or onion-shaped domes are common decorative features. Intermittently employed in the exterior and interiors are geometric and vegetable motifs. These characteristics distinguish Islamic architecture and art from Malay cultural themes by highlighting the emphasis on non-representational art forms.

The Brunei Association of Surveyors, Engineers, and Architects (PUJA) and the MIB Supreme Council of Brunei have collaborated since 2012 to further the use of MIB ideas in building. The significance of incorporating Islamic, Malay, royal, and ceremonial features into Brunei's architectural designs—especially for government buildings—was emphasized at a conference conducted in February 2013. This seminar mandated Islamic elements and formally established MIB architecture as the national style. This strategy is demonstrated by the Al-Falaah School in Diplomatic Enclave, which combines Islamic architectural features, traditional Malay culture, and royal symbols. The construction of mosques in Brunei is influenced by Middle Eastern traditions, but it also takes into account local cultural identity and natural elements, demonstrating the country's dedication to maintaining its own architectural character.

== National mosques ==
The two masjid Negara (state mosques), also known as masjid utama (main mosques), in Brunei, the SOAS Mosque and the JAHB Mosque, stand for the harmony between the monarchy and Islam as the official state religion. Constructed in 1958 with personal contributions from the late Sultan Omar Ali Saifuddien III and Sultan Hassanal Bolkiah in 1994, these mosques are national icons profoundly ingrained in Bruneian Malays' collective consciousness.

Sultan Omar Ali Saifuddien III is frequently credited with designing the SOAS Mosque, personally oversaw the design of these mosques as well as several other administrative structures. During this time, Brunei's distinctive mosque architecture came to be, distinguished by its inventiveness and incorporation of regional cultural icons. The mosque, which is situated next to the Kedayan River and encircled by an artificial lagoon, serves as a symbolic link between Brunei's past and present. The mosque has aspects of Malay culture incorporated into its Mughal architecture. The most notable example is the concrete replica of a 16th-century Mahligai (royal barge) in the lagoon, which is a reproduction of Sultan Bolkiah's boat.

Accessible since 1967, this boat is modelled after the ancient longboats that the indigenous peoples of Borneo used for battle, funeral rites, and royal festivities. It has a bird-shaped bow, stern, and center hypostyle pavilion with a pyramidal roof. European drawings, woodcarvings, cloth paintings, and murals frequently include these vessels. The SOAS Mosque's boat walkway and the lagoon around it are decorated with ridges that resemble the kelasak (traditional shield). The boat itself is lavishly embellished with floral and vegetal designs that draw inspiration from Bruneian textile weaving patterns and royal regalia. The regal symbol of Sultan Sharif Ali is displayed on the finial of the main pavilion. The mosque's water fountain and ablution area are also adorned with mosaics that mimic the rich colours, patterns, and designs of Brunei's best songket textiles, which are highly prized and integral to royal customs.

The SOAS Mosque had modifications that included the insertion of new embellishments to the main hall vault and entry ceiling during the building of the JAHB Mosque in 1994. The architectural embellishment of both religious and secular structures notably featured the foliage pattern known as air muleh, which is regarded as a national emblem and reflects the Malay identity and character of the Bruneians. Air muleh patterns are used in the interior design of the JAHB Mosque, as well as in the minaret walls, entablatures, and chandelier glasswork. The main hall's chandelier discreetly displays wing pairs, a component of the royal and national symbols, while the minarets' octagonal tessera produce a "pixelated" look evocative of traditional Bruneian woven fabrics.

== Gallery ==
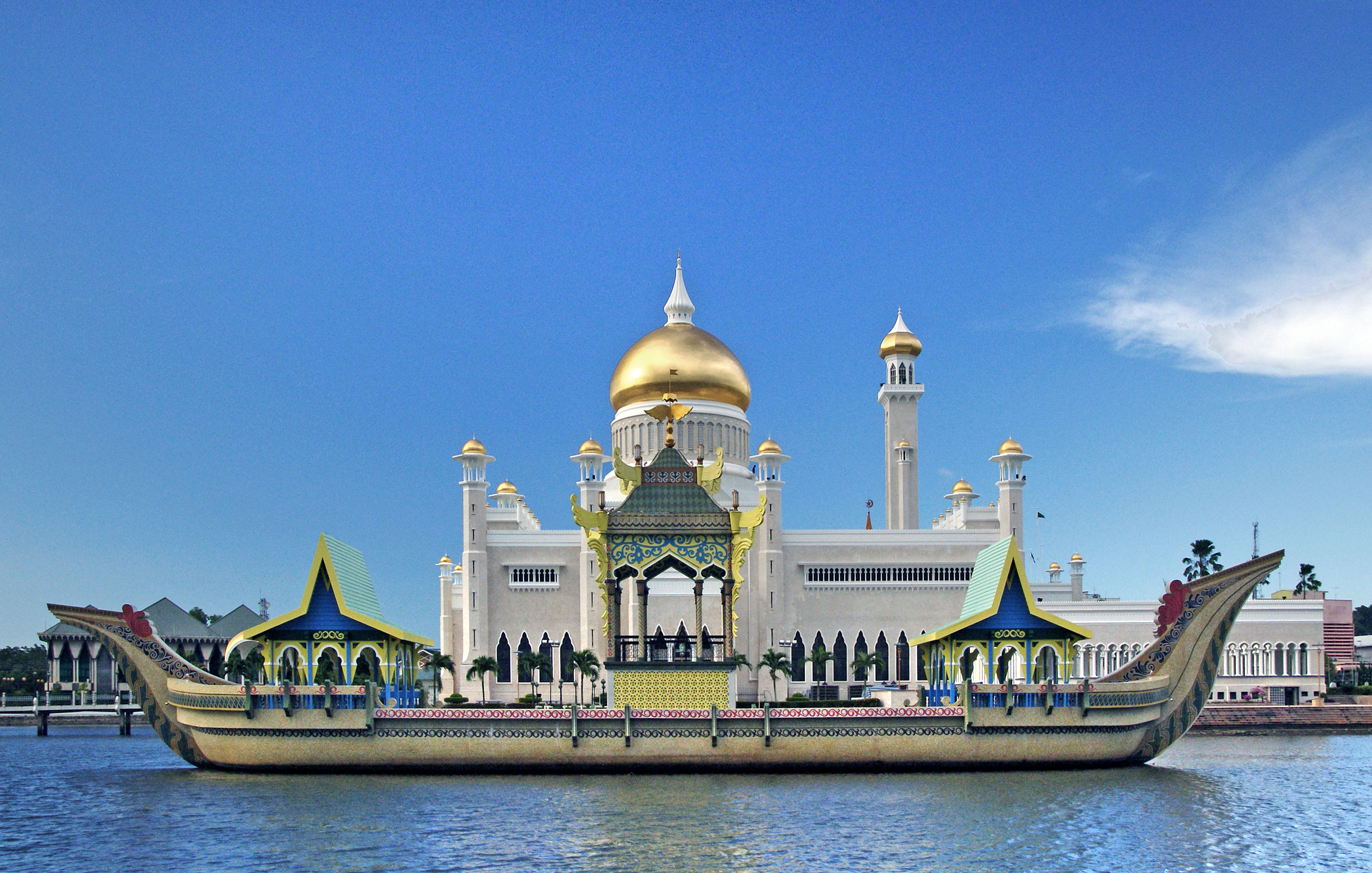
SOAS Mosque and the Mahligai

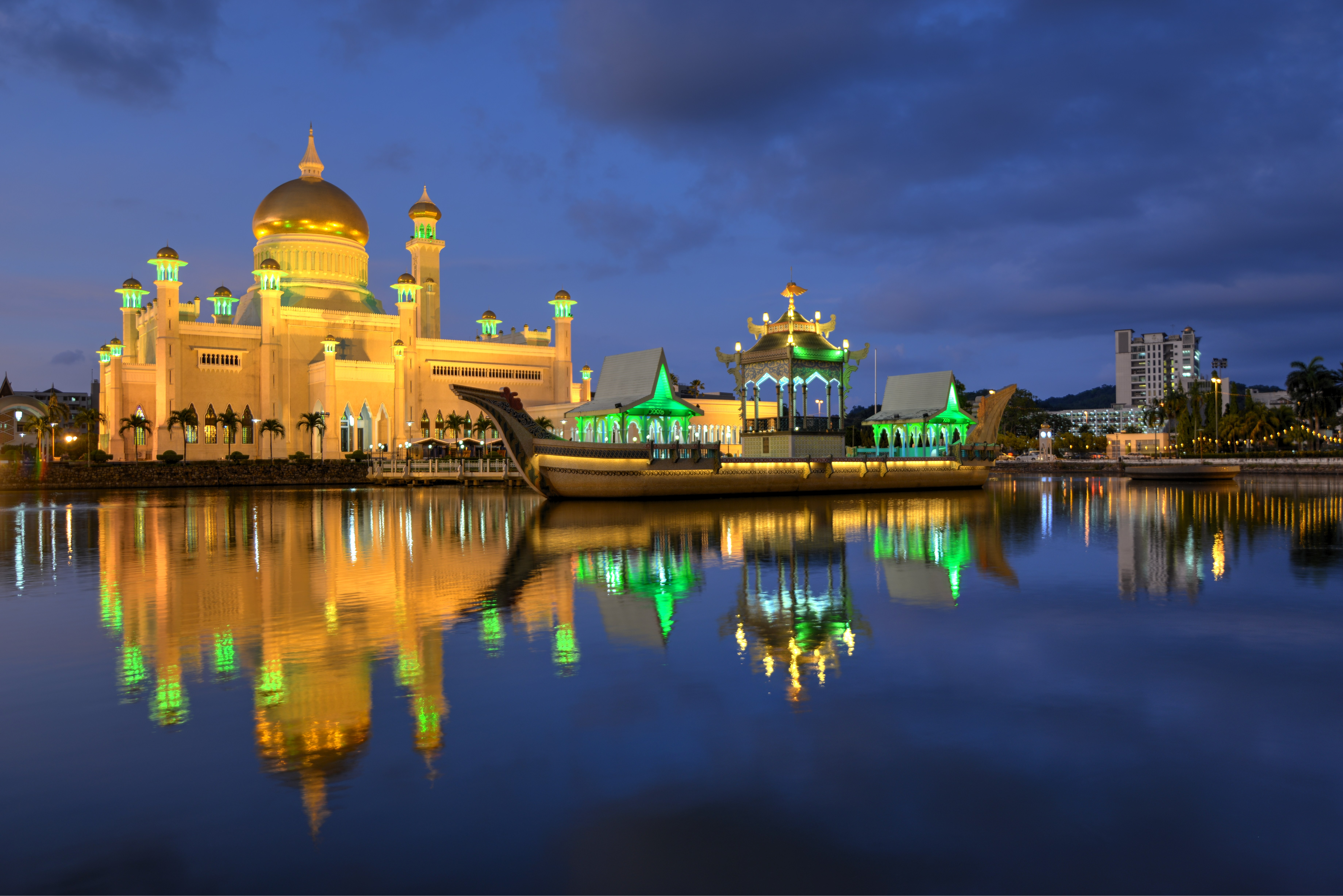
SOAS Mosque at night

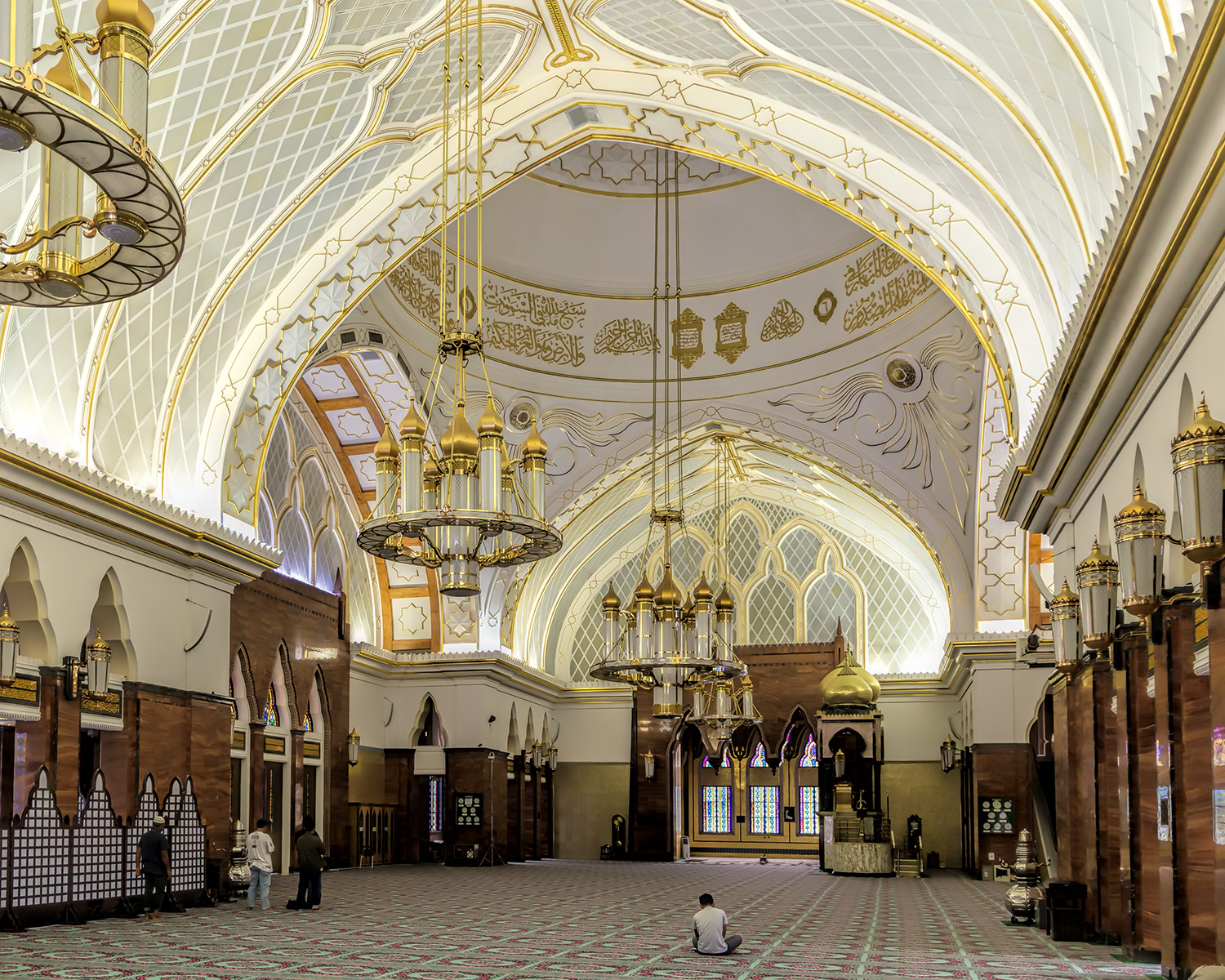
SOAS Mosque interior

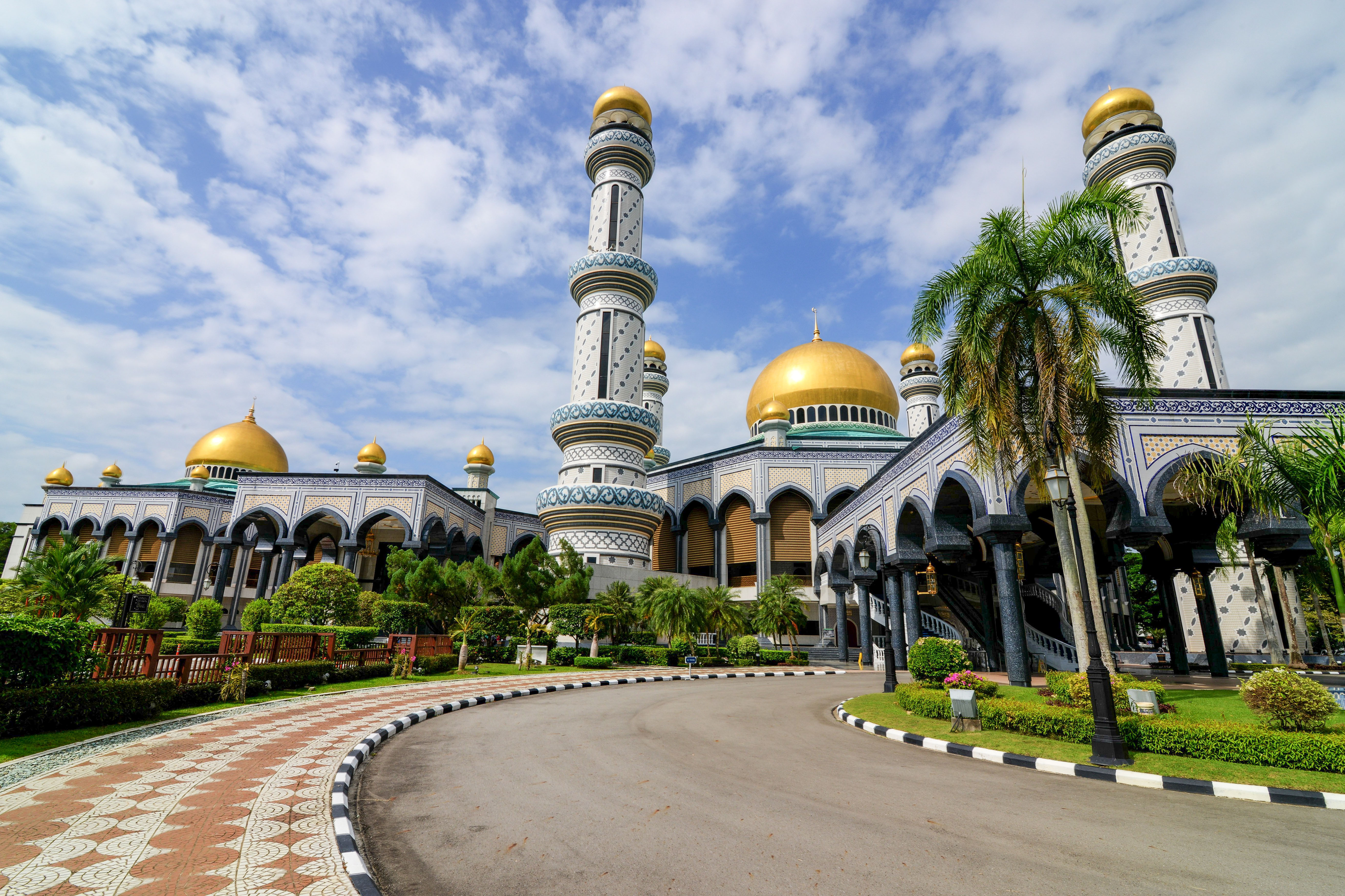
JAHB Mosque exterior

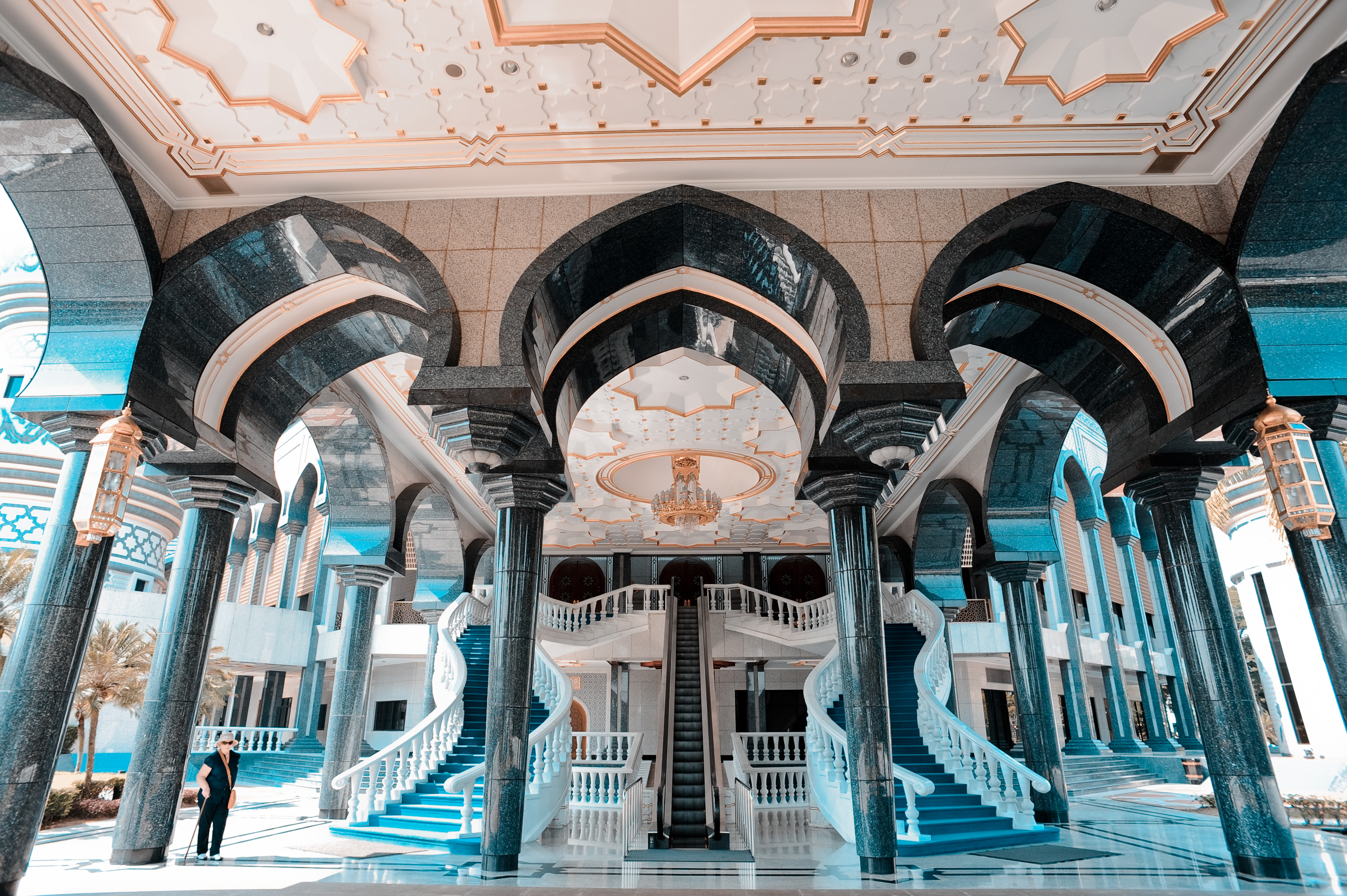
JAHB Mosque main entrance

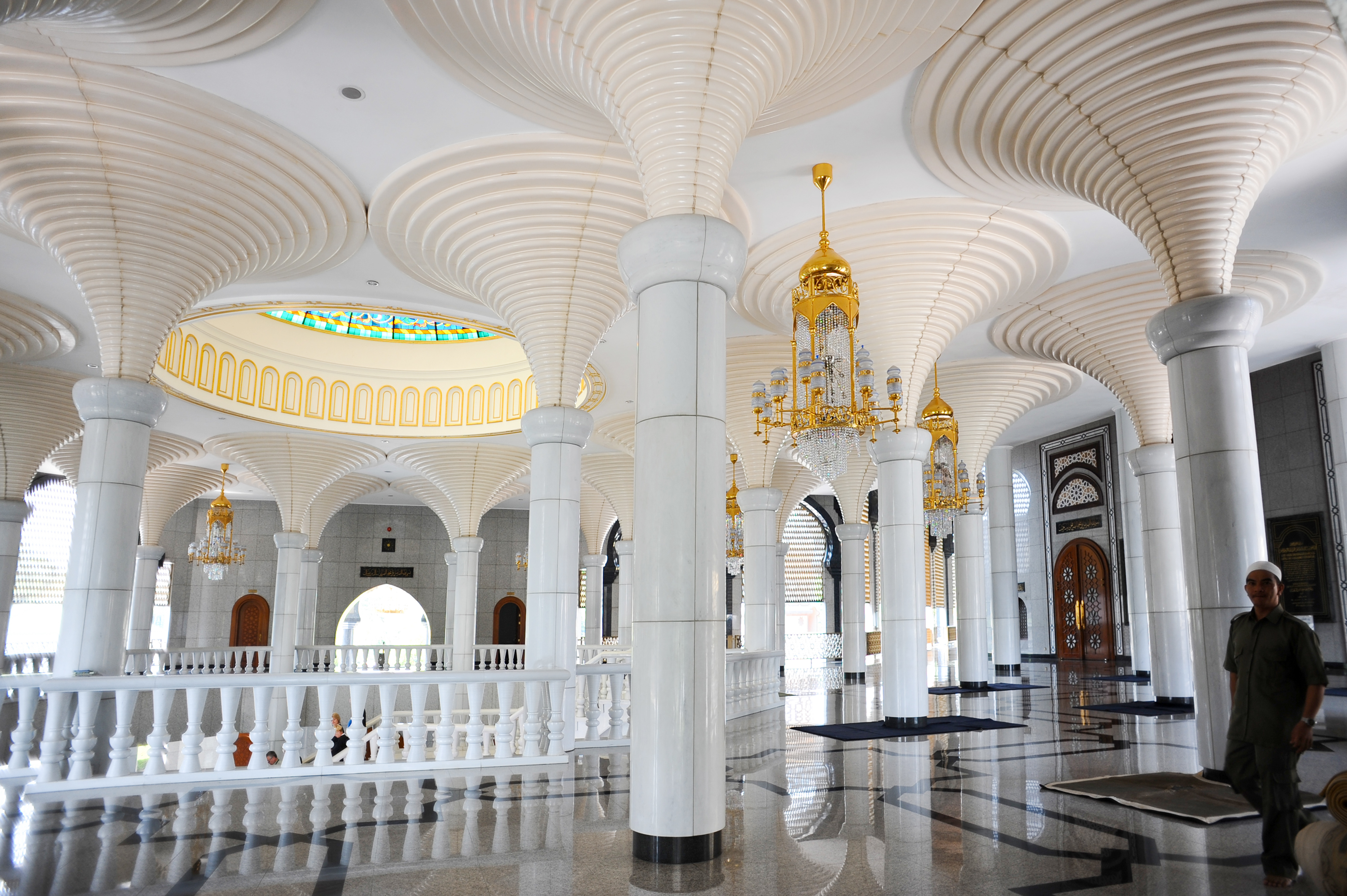
JAHB Mosque interior

== See also ==
- Islam in Brunei
- List of mosques in Brunei
