= Al-Ansar Mosque =

Al-Ansar Mosque may refer to:

- Masjid Al-Ansar, a mosque in Singapore
- Al-Ansar Mosque, a mosque in Jenin, on the West Bank of the Jordan River
