= Al-Khodr Mosque =

Mosque in Beirut, Lebanon

- Arabic: جامع الخضر
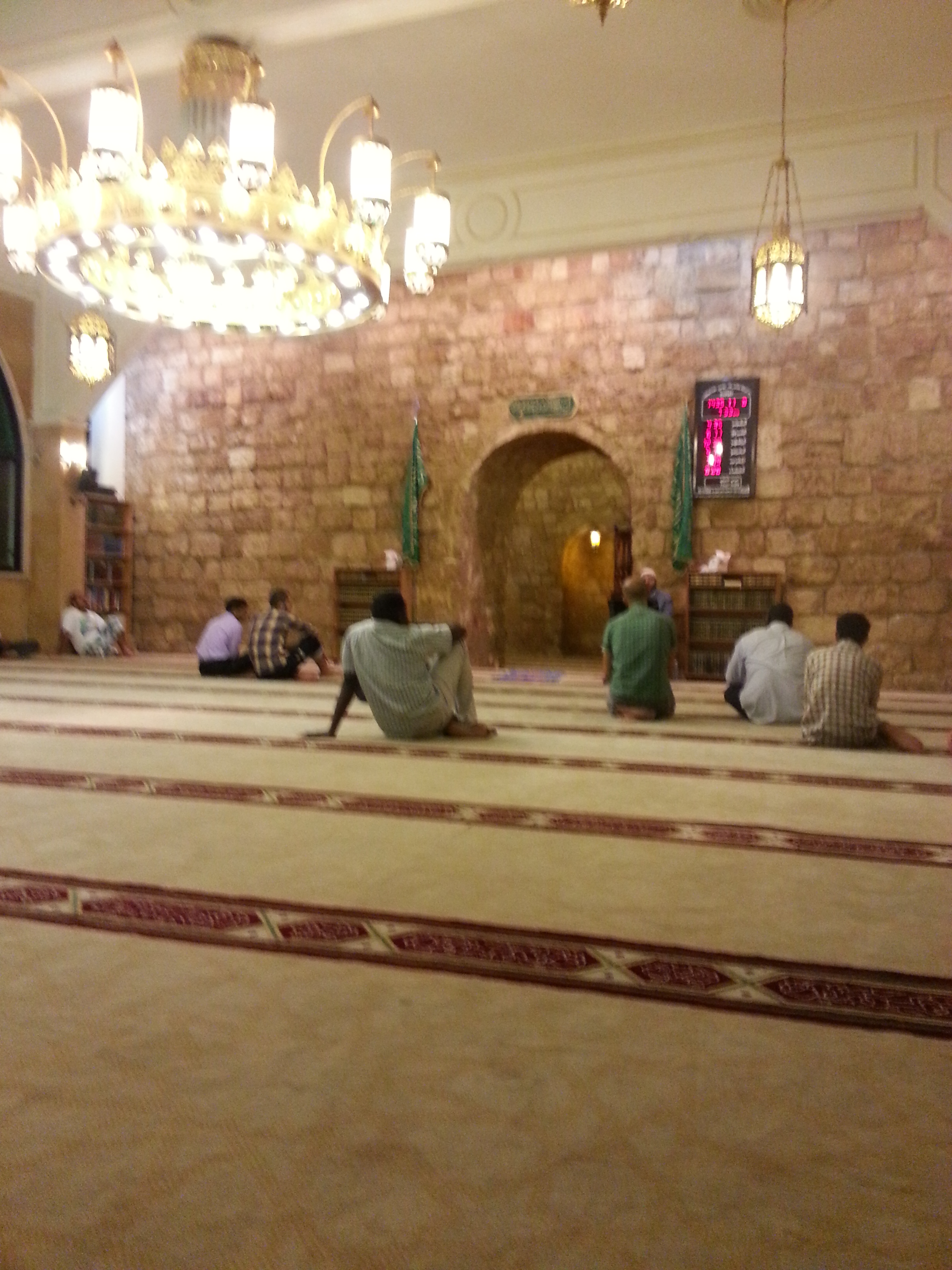
- Interior of the mosque

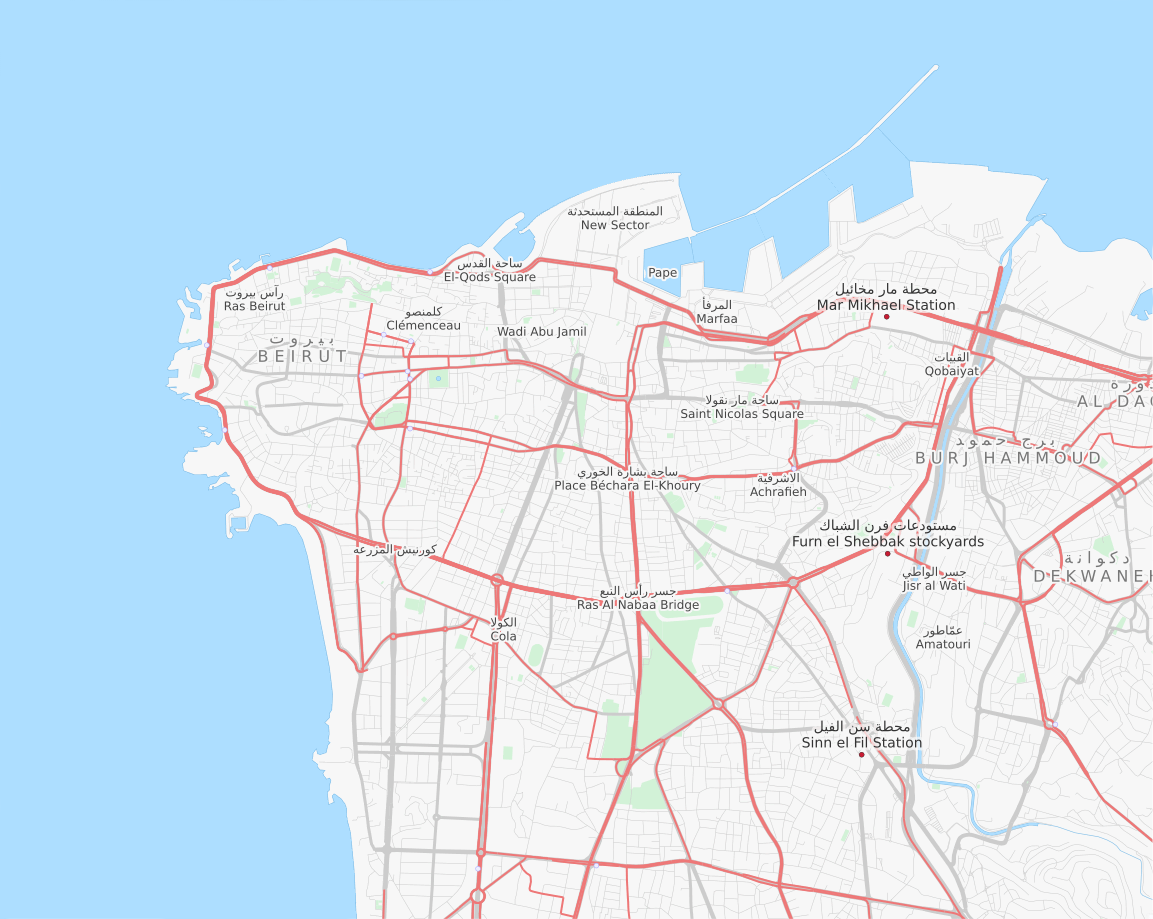
- Location within Beirut

Religion
- Affiliation: Islam
- Ecclesiastical or organisational status: Church (before 1661); Mosque (since 1661)
- Status: Active

Location
- Location: Beirut
- Country: Lebanon
- Coordinates: 33°53′51″N 35°31′58″E

Architecture
- Type: Mosque architecture
- Style: Byzantine; Crusader; Ottoman; Modern

Al-Khodr Mosque (Arabic: جامع الخضر), formerly the Church of Saint George (Arabic: كنيسة مار جرجس), is a mosque located in the Mar Mikhaël neighborhood of Beirut, Lebanon. It is famous for being the alleged site of where St. George slew a dragon.

The mosque’s namesake is used for the Khodr sector within the Greater Beirut municipal jurisdiction and extends from Armenia Street to Karantina.

== History ==
Khodr Mosque was originally a Byzantine church which was built on the spot where Saint George slew the dragon. The church contained an icon of the Virgin Mary breastfeeding the baby Jesus (Note: The icon was originally in a grotto sanctuary dedicated to both the Virgin Mary and St. George known as "Our Bosom Lady". The grotto was said to be the den of the dragon.) before it was transferred to Saint George Greek Orthodox Cathedral in old Beirut. Saint Helena, the mother of Constantine the Great, was said to have visited the chapel and given it a white marble pillar on her return from Jerusalem. When the Crusaders came to the region in the 12th century they expanded the chapel adding a crypt, dome and monastery.

In the year 1570, the chapel which was Greek Orthodox at the time was also shared with the Maronite Catholics due to the Ottomans seizing the Maronite Church. The Maronites complained about this to the Hobeiche sheikhs until sheikh Youssef Abu-Mansour came to Beirut and made a written agreement with the Orthodox Dahhan sheikhs that the Church of Saint George would be shared by both communities both celebrating their liturgies there. However, in 1661 the Church was taken by the governor of Sidon, Ali Basha, due to the Christians not being able to pay the jizya tax and was converted into a mosque giving it the name Khodr.

Professor Marlene Kanaan points out how Saint George is sometimes associated with the Islamic figure Khidr however the mosque's imam, Ali Bitar, argues it was named after Nabi Khodr, a companion of prophet Musa instead and that the mosque was never a Church.

Much of the mosque was demolished in the 1950s with only the southern half of the structure remaining. The interior of this section has a vaulted ceiling with an apse on its eastern end and a mihrab in the southern section. It also has an arched front door which leads to an extension of the mosque, which was completed in 1934, that has a three-arched portico in front of its northern entrance. Furthermore, a modern minaret was added in 1949 by prime minister Riad Al Solh.

Today the mosque serves as a religious center for Muslims across the Beirut River and even has congregants from as far as Brummana and Jounieh as there are no mosques in those areas.

== Healing pillar and well ==
A pillar given to the chapel by Saint Helen, the mother of Constantine the Great, was said to have had healing powers and people afflicted with rheumatism would touch it seeking a cure for their ailments. The pillar was removed in the 1950s by the sheikh who gave it to the waqf administration of Dar al-Fatwa and its whereabouts have been unknown since.

The mosque used to have a 20-foot domed water well that Christians would bathe in for its alleged properties in helping with fertility. However in the 1950s, the imam of the mosque at the time, Sheikh Mohammed Rashid Khalidy had the well demolished in order to make a playground for the al-Khodor primary school as it was viewed as a potential safety hazard.

== 1745 description ==
The Anglican Bishop Richard Pococke visited the mosque in 1745 giving a description of it saying:

I set forward on my journey from Bayreut on the first of June, and went to the east along the side of the bay; after having traveled about a league, we came to the place where, they say, saint George killed the dragon which was about to devour the king of Bayreut’s daughter: There is a mosque on the spot, which was formerly a Greek church; near it is a well, and they say, that the dragon usually came out of the hole, which is now the mouth of it. The medieval writers say that this place was called Cappadocia. In this mosque I saw extraordinary ceremony performed on one of the Turks that was with me; who sitting down on the ground, the religious person, who had the care of the mosque, took a piece of a small marble pillar, in which, they say, there is an extraordinary virtue against all sorts of pains, and rolled it on the back of the Turk for a considerable time.

== See also ==
- List of mosques in Lebanon
