= Kampong Tagap =

- Village
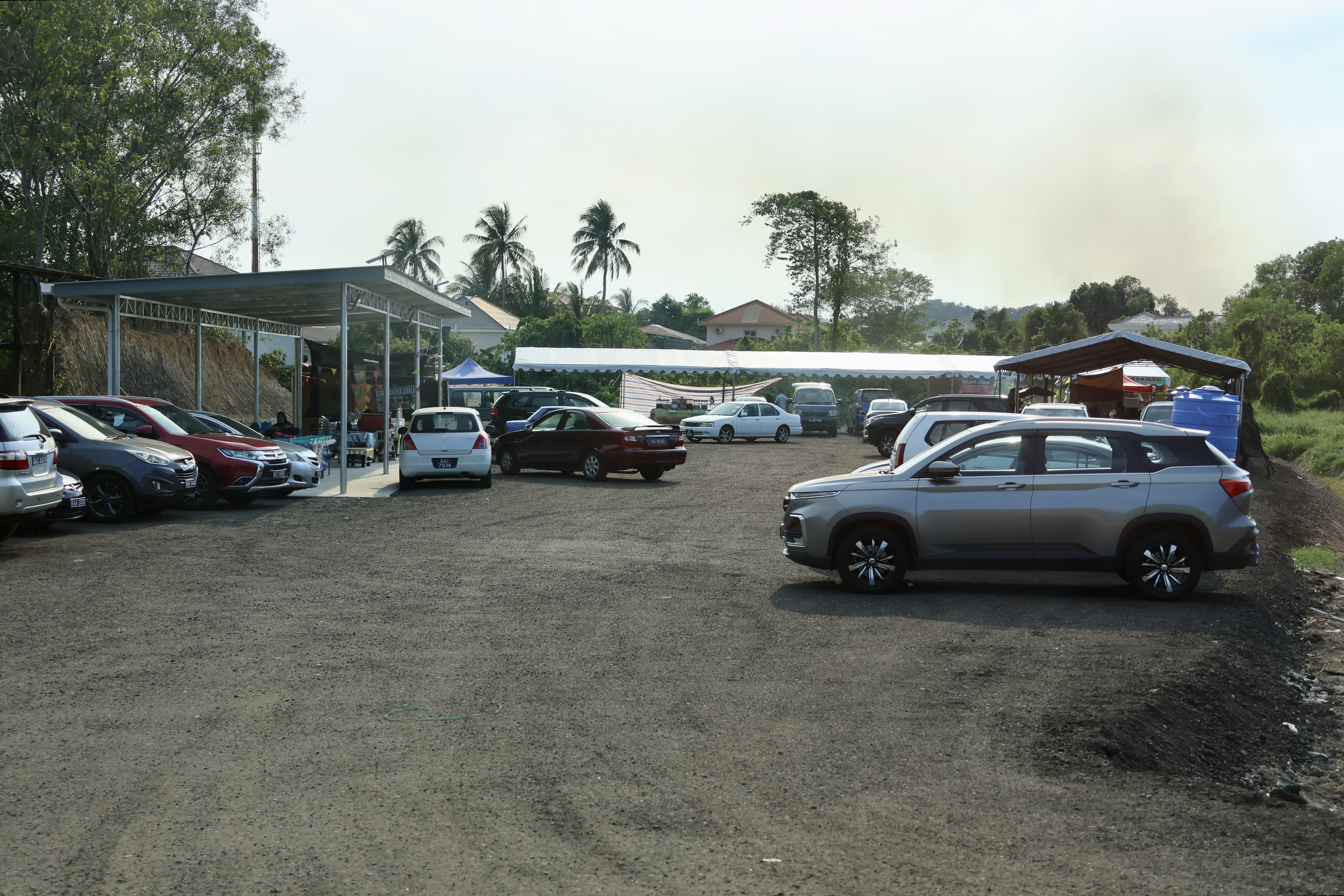

- Location in Brunei
- Coordinates: 4°54′37″N 114°50′38″E
- Country: Brunei
- District: Brunei-Muara
- Mukim: Sengkurong

Government
  - Village head: Latif Tengah

Population (2016)
  - Total: 1,452
- Time zone: UTC+8 (BNT)
- Postcode: BG1521

Kampong Tagap is a village in Brunei-Muara District, Brunei. The population was 1,452 in 2016. It is one of the villages within Mukim Sengkurong. The village is under the responsibility of the village head (ketua kampung) of Kampong Sengkurong 'B'. It has the postcode BG1521.
