= Kampong Selayun =

- Village
- Location in Brunei
- Coordinates: 4°54′20″N 114°51′02″E
- Country: Brunei
- District: Brunei-Muara
- Mukim: Sengkurong

Government
  - Village head: Latif Tengah

Population (2016)
  - Total: 1,875
- Time zone: UTC+8 (BNT)
- Postcode: BG1721

Kampong Selayun is a village in Brunei-Muara District, Brunei. The population was 1,875 in 2016. It is one of the villages within Mukim Sengkurong. The village is under the responsibility of the village head (ketua kampung) of Kampong Sengkurong 'B'. It has the postcode BG1721.
