= Afindi Yati Tuah =

Bruneian footballer

Afindi Yati
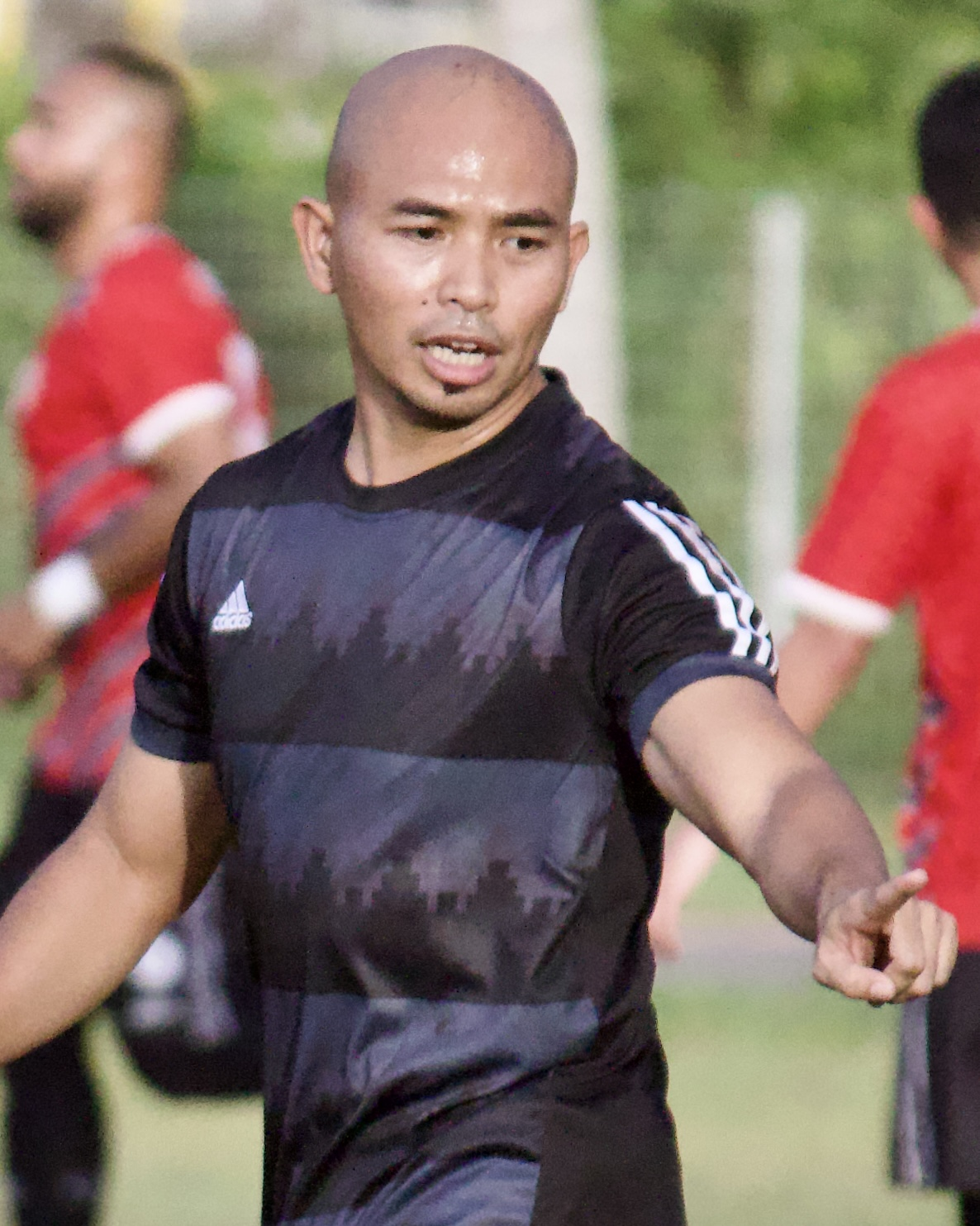
- Afindi in 2022

Personal information
- Full name: Afindi Yati bin Tuah
- Date of birth: 30 May 1982 (age 44)
- Place of birth: Sengkurong, Brunei
- Position: Forward

Youth career
- 1998–1999: MSSSBD

Senior career*
| Years | Team | Apps | (Gls) |
| 1999–2003 | Kasuka | | |
| 2001–2004 | Brunei | | (2) |
| 2004–2005 | Sengkurong | | |
| 2005–2008 | NBT | | |
| 2008 | DPMM | 0 | (0) |
| 2012–2014 | QAF | | (1) |
| 2015 | Jerudong | | (2) |
| 2016–2019 | Kasuka | | (5) |
| 2020–2021 | Wijaya | | (0) |
| 2022–2023 | Kota Ranger | 5 | (0) |

International career^{‡}
| 2000 | Brunei U19 | | |
| 2002 | Brunei U21 | | (2) |
| 2003–2008 | Brunei | 6 | (0) |
- * Club domestic league appearances and goals as of 6 November 2024 ‡ National team caps and goals as of 26 August 2022

Afindi Yati bin Tuah (born 30 May 1982) is a Bruneian former footballer who played as a forward. He was a journeyman in Brunei football, having appeared for eight Bruneian clubs in addition to the Brunei representative team that were playing in the Malaysian Liga Perdana 2 from 2001 to 2004.

== Club career ==
=== Youth career ===
Afindi attended Sengkurong Primary School and afterwards Sayyidina Husain Secondary School and was selected for what is nowadays called the Brunei Darussalam Schools' Sports Council (MSSSBD) sports scheme. After a series of district-level accolades, Afindi joined Kasuka FC in 1999 and racked up a host of silverware under coach Moksen Mohammad. Kasuka won the Pepsi Cup League in 2001, beating the already mighty DPMM FC in the final.

=== Brunei (Malaysia Premier League team) ===
Afindi also turned out for Brunei's national team that was in freefall two years after winning the Malaysia Cup, beginning with the 2001 Liga Perdana 2. It would be two seasons later when Afindi nets his first goal for the Wasps, the decider in a 2–3 win over Selangor MPPJ on 9 March 2003. The return of Brian Bothwell boosted the team that was pushing for promotion but a slow start to the season proved detrimental as Brunei finished fifth and outside the Malaysia Super League play-offs, only due to goal difference.

=== B-League and DPMM stint ===
Afindi played for Kasuka in the B-League in 2002 and 2003, and moved to Sengkurong in 2004 when he faced relegation to Premier Two. He transferred to newly promoted NBT FC and stayed there for two seasons, finishing in mid-table. At the end of the 2007–08 Malaysia Super League season, DPMM FC recruited several NBT FC players namely Azman Ilham Noor and Abu Bakar Mahari with Afindi joining them in preseason, but the de-registration of the Brunei Football Association (BAFA) and subsequent ruffling by FIFA meant that DPMM had to move to the S.League. However, by the time the season started, Afindi was no longer in the squad.

=== Post-hiatus ===
After a few years out of playing league football Afindi signed for QAF FC in the 2012–13 Brunei Super League season. In the following season he finally managed to score for QAF in a 8–0 victory over Wijaya FC. He joined several of his teammates to move to Jerudong FC after the season concluded and QAF FC disbanded. He scored his first goal for Jerudong in a 4–1 victory against Lun Bawang FC on 17 May 2015.

=== Kasuka ===
Afindi next returned to his first club Kasuka FC, reformed and newly promoted into the 2016 Brunei Super League. On the third matchday against Indera SC on 27 March, Afindi was involved in an altercation which resulted in a red card for Hardi Bujang and sparked scenes of unrest from both sides that forced the match to be abandoned. The two teams were fined and suspended for this but after a lengthy appeal that shortened the league to a single round of matches, the suspensions were rescinded. Afindi scored his first goal for Kasuka in a 2–0 victory against MS PDB on 21 August from the penalty spot.

In the 2017-18 season, Afindi contributed three goals to help Kasuka reach a commendable fourth-place finish. Towards their best ever season of 2018-19 when they finished as runners-up, Kasuka added talented young Brunei youth internationals to their ranks including striker Hanif Aiman Adanan who eventually became the league's top scorer. This reduced Afindi's role into a bit-part player, finding the back of the net only once against Lun Bawang FC in a 5–0 victory on 24 February 2019. He also converted a penalty in a 2–0 win against Wijaya FC in the FA Cup the next month.

=== Later career ===
Afindi switched clubs to Wijaya FC for the 2020 season, and stayed with them in 2021 after the league was cancelled. The 2021 season lasted a little longer before the COVID-19 pandemic rendered the league incomplete for a second time. He then played for Kota Ranger FC from 2022 to 2023.

== International career ==
Afindi was selected for the Brunei under-19s to compete at the 2000 AFC Youth Championship qualification matches held in Guam. Two years later, he played for the under-21s as host team for the first Hassanal Bolkiah Trophy. He scored a penalty in a 1–0 win against Laos in the only victory for Brunei in the group stage. He leveled the score to 1–1 in the next match against Malaysia but the game finished 7–3 in favour of the neighbours, eliminating Brunei from the competition.

Afindi made his full international debut at the 2004 AFC Asian Cup qualification matches held in the Maldives in March 2003, playing both games. As a squad member of DPMM FC, he also took the field for the 2008 AFF Championship qualification games held in Cambodia in October 2008. Brunei only placed fourth out of 5 teams in the group table, denying their appearance at the tournament proper.

== Honours ==
Kasuka FC

- Brunei-Muara District Champions' League: 2000
- Pengiran Sanggamara Diraja Cup: 2000
- Mukim Kilanas Cup: 2000
- Amir PP Cup: 2000
- Pepsi Cup League: 2001

== Personal life ==
Afindi works as a sales executive for various automobile brands including Proton.
