= Abdul Hamid Bakal =

Bruneian politician (1939–2024)

Yang Dimuliakan Pehin Datu Imam Dato Paduka Seri Setia Abdul Hamid Bakal PSSUB DSNB PHBS PBLI PKL
- عبد الحميد باكل
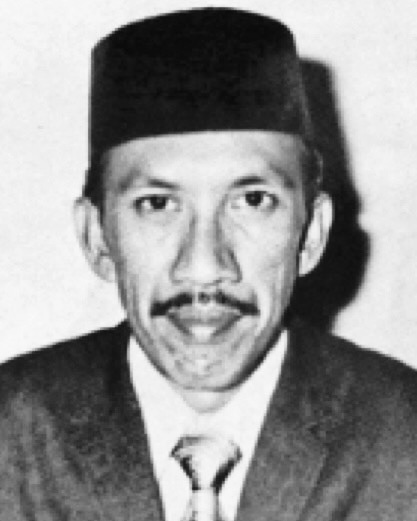
- Abdul Hamid in the 1960s

Member of the Legislative Council
- In office 13 January 2017 – 6 March 2022
- In office 1 June 2011 – 11 February 2015

Personal details
- Born: 2 July 1939 Kampong Tanjong Nangka, Brunei–Muara, Brunei
- Died: 2 February 2024 (aged 84) Brunei
- Resting place: Bukit Sadur Muslim Cemetery, Brunei–Muara, Brunei
- Education: Al-Azhar University (MA)
- Profession: Muslim scholar; politician

Abdul Hamid bin Bakal (2 July 1939 – 2 February 2024) was a Bruneian aristocrat and Muslim scholar who held several high-ranking and important positions in the Government of Brunei.

== Career ==
Abdul Hamid earned a Master of Arts (MA) from Al-Azhar University. He began working as the Superintendent of Information and Tabligh on 24 December 1966, and also served as the Religious Education Regulator, Deputy Chief Qadi, and Senior Religious Officer. He was appointed Chief Qadi in 1977 and served in that capacity until the end of 1994. He was appointed as a member of the Public Service Commission on 1 January 1995, and served in that capacity until 25 March 2001. On 26 March 2001, he was named Chief Justice Syar'i.e. He had been employed for more than 40 years and spent more than 26 years in the Syariah Judiciary prior to that.

Abdul Hamid also held memberships in the Privy Council on 1 July 2008, the Council of Succession, the Islamic Religious Council, and the Council of State Customs. In addition, he served as the Kampong Tanjong Nangka Consultative Council (MPK) advisor. Borneo Bulletin formally declared on 31 May 2011, that he will join the Legislative Council, effective 1 June. In September 2011, he participated in the 32nd General Assembly of the ASEAN Inter-Parliamentary Assembly (AIPA) in Cambodia as a representative of Brunei Darussalam. On 13 January 2017, he was reappointed as a Legislative Council Member, and would hold that position until its official disbandment on 6 March 2022.

== Death ==
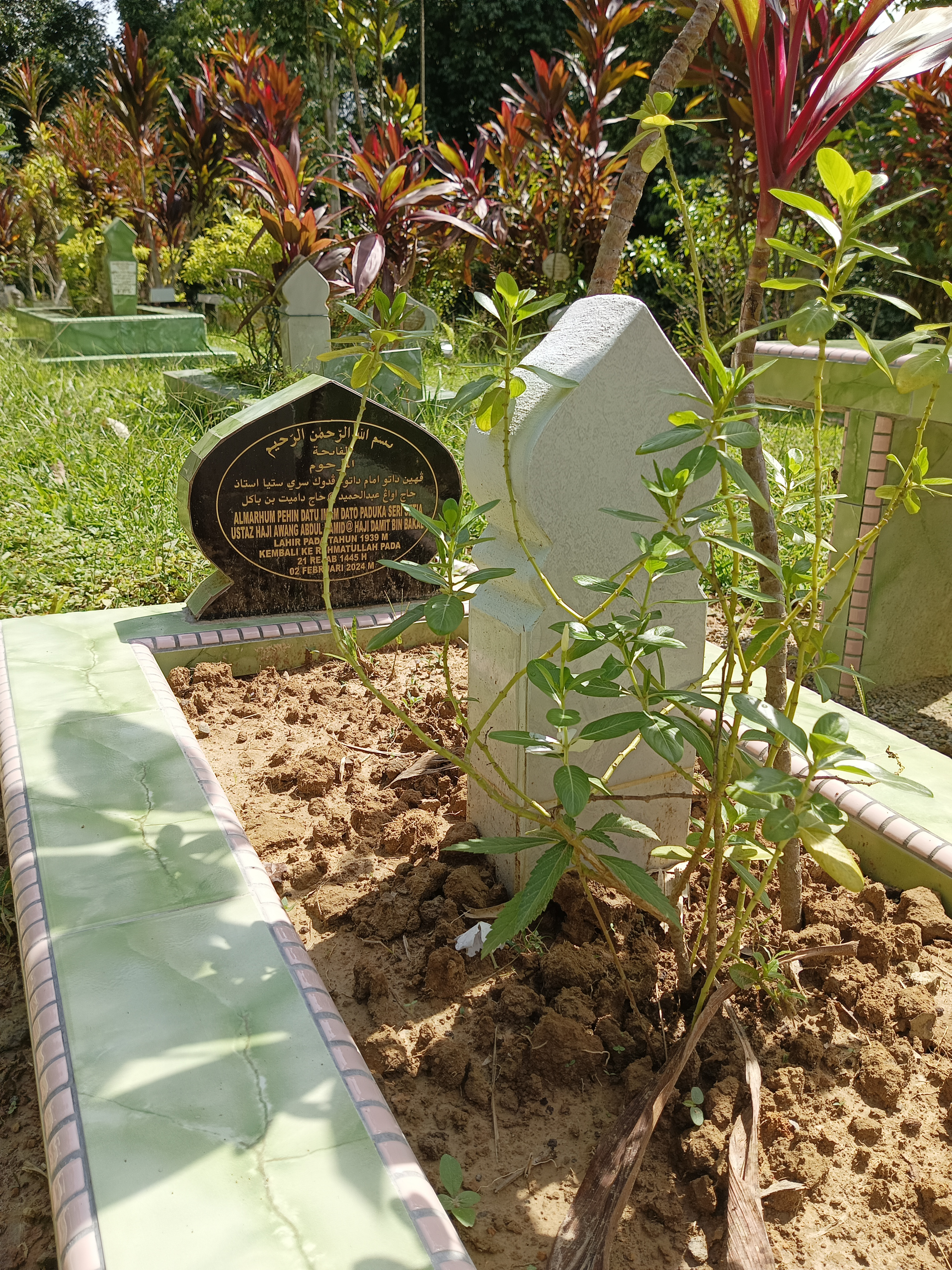
Grave of Abdul Hamid Bakal at Bukit Sadur Muslim Cemetery, Tanjong Nangka

Abdul Hamid died on 2 February 2024, at the age of 84. His funeral rites were held at Sultan Sharif Ali Mosque in Sengkurong, which was attended by Sultan Hassanal Bolkiah, members of the Royal family, state dignitaries and also his colleagues before his burial at Bukit Sadur Muslim Cemetery, Tanjong Nangka.

== Books ==
- Pembentokan keluarga dari sudut pandangan Islam (in Malay). Jabatan Hal Ehwal Ugama. 1978.
- Tinjauan mengenai kadhi (in Malay). Jabatan Hal Ehwal Ugama. 1980.
- Panduan Jumaat (in Malay). Jabatan Hal Ehwal Ugama. 1980.

== Honours ==
Abdul Hamid held the Manteri title of Yang Berhormat (The Honourable) Pehin Datu Imam on 25 April 1974. Additionally, he earned the following honours:

- Order of Islam Brunei First Class (PSSUB; 11 Fewbruary 1976) – Dato Paduka Seri Setia
- Order of Setia Negara Brunei Second Class (DSNB) – Dato Setia
- Sultan Hassanal Bolkiah Medal First Class (PHBS; 15 July 2010)
- Pingat Bakti Laila Ikhlas (PBLI)
- Long Service Medal (PKL)
