= Mukim Sengkurong =

Mukim of Brunei

- Mukim
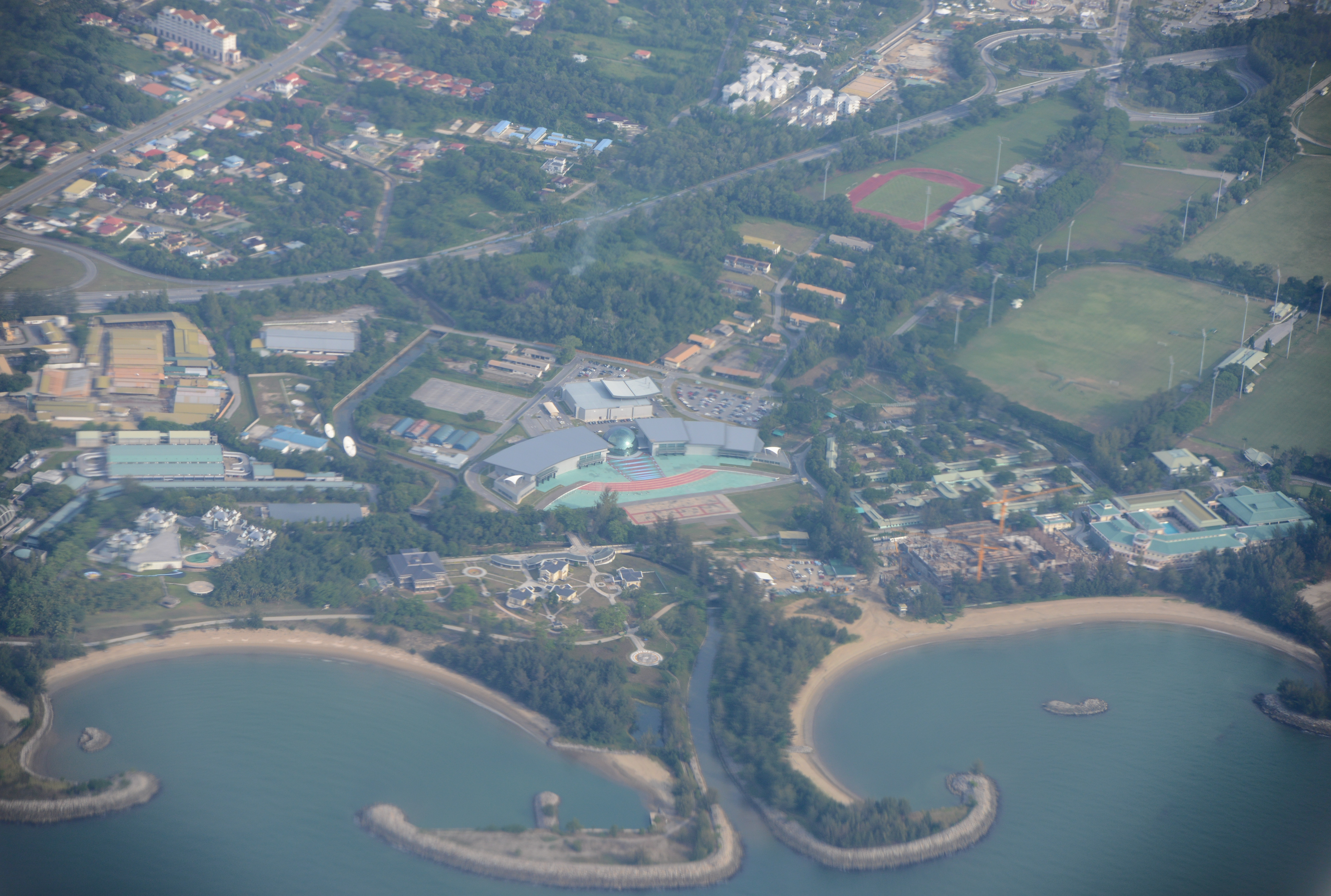
- Kampong Jerudong

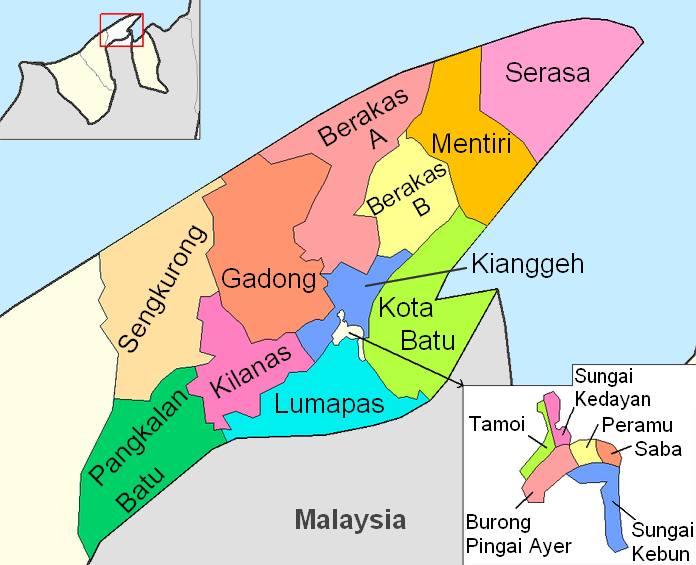
- Sengkurong is in caramel.
- Coordinates: 4°56′09″N 114°49′44″E
- Country: Brunei
- District: Brunei-Muara

Government
  - Penghulu: vacant until next election

Population (2026)
  - Total: 42,000 - 43,000 (estimation figure)
- Time zone: UTC+8 (BNT)
- Postcode: BGxx21, BGxx22

Mukim Sengkurong is a mukim in Brunei-Muara District, Brunei. The population was 31,493 in 2016.

== Etymology ==
The mukim is named after Kampong Sengkurong, one of the villages it encompasses.

== Geography ==
The mukim is located in the western- and north-westernmost part of the district, bordering the South China Sea to the north, Mukim Gadong 'A' to the east, Mukim Kilanas to the south-east, Mukim Pengkalan Batu to the south and Mukim Keriam in Tutong District to the west.

Off the coastline of Mukim Sengkurong there are various land extensions to the sea. Some of these prominent 'land extensions' are located near Empire Hotel & Country Club and Pantai Jerudong. These man-made modifications include two, spit-like long extensions towards the sea that forms an almost lagoon-like enclosure that surrounds a body of water to the left and right. Within this 'lagoon' is also a man-made island. Almost all the coastline of Mukim Sengkurong has been modified and added with various 'land extensions' with different shapes and sizes and some pine trees are also planted on them.

== Demographics ==
As of 2016 census, the population was 31,493 with 52.1% males and 47.9% females. The mukim had 5,953 households occupying 5,880 dwellings. Among the population, 46% lived in urban areas, while the remainder of 54% lived in rural areas.

== Administration ==
As of 2021, the mukim comprised the following census villages:

Settlements	Population (2021)	Ketua kampung (2026)
Kampong Selayun (Note: Administered under the village head of Kampong Sengkurong 'B')	2,956	Muhammad Faris Syah Bin Haji Hanapi
Kampong Sengkurong 'B' (Note: Kampong Sengkurong 'A' and 'B' are commonly known collectively as Kampong Sengkurong.)	3,852	Abd Razak bin Haji Ismail
Kampong Tagap	2,262	Haji Latif bin Tengah
Kampong Sengkurong 'A'	3,151	Mohammad Shahrizan Bin Masri
Kampong Mulaut	5,981	Hamizan bin Haji Mustapa
Kampong Peninjau (Note: Also known as Kampong Jerudong 'B')	4,240	Kamis bin Panjang
Kampong Jerudong	3,650	Mohammad Nazmi Fa'iz bin Haji Abu Bakar
Kampong Tanjong Nangka	3,838	Mohammad Rakin Bin Ramli
Kampong Lugu (Note: Includes the public housing estate RPN Kampong Lugu)	5,795	Haji Bujang bin Haji Abdul Ghani
Kampong Katimahar	865	Haji Bujang bin Haji Abdul Ghani
Kampong Kulapis	1,986	
Kampong Pasai (Note: Administered under the village head of Kampong Sengkurong 'A')	2,396	—N/a

== Other locations ==
Other locations within the mukim include:

- Pantai Jerudong
- Pulau Pungit
