= Sayyidina Husain Secondary School =

- Sekolah Menengah Sayyidina Husain

Location
- Simpang 121, Jalan Jerudong; Sengkurong, Brunei-Muara; Brunei
- Coordinates: 4°53′54″N 114°49′57″E

Information
- School type: Government, Secondary
- Established: 1994; 32 years ago
- School district: Cluster 2
- Authority: Ministry of Education
- Principal: Norizah binti Othman
- Years offered: 7-11
- Gender: Mixed

Sayyidina Husain Secondary School (Malay: Sekolah Menengah Sayyidina Husain) is a government secondary school in Sengkurong, a settlement in Brunei-Muara District, Brunei. The school provides five years of general secondary education leading up to GCE O Level qualification. It was established in May 1994 and has a student population of around 1,100. The current principal is Nor'izzah binti Othman since January 2022. It is one of the schools under Cluster 4, a school district of the Ministry of Education.

== Name ==
The school is named after Husayn ibn Ali, a grandson of Muhammad and a prominent figure in Islam.
