= Kampong Tanjong Nangka =

Kampong Tanjong Nangka Kampung Tanjong Nangka
- Village
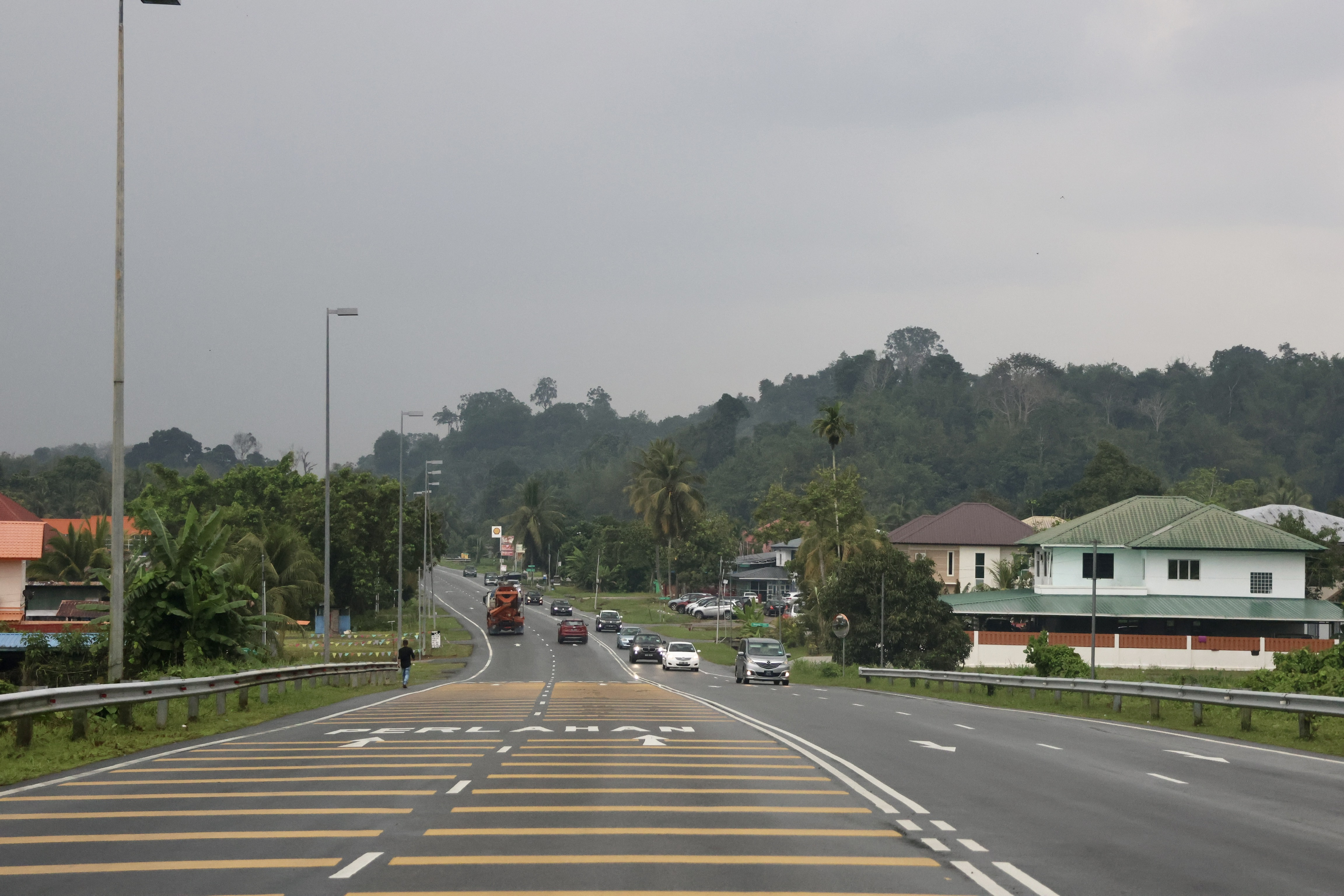
- Jalan Tutong

- Location in Brunei
- Coordinates: 4°52′35″N 114°49′44″E
- Country: Brunei
- District: Brunei-Muara
- Mukim: Sengkurong
- Named for: Jackfruit

Government
  - Village head: Hamdan Ajak

Population (2016)
  - Total: 3,118
- Time zone: UTC+8 (BNT)
- Postcode: BG2321

Kampong Tanjong Nangka is a village in the west of Brunei-Muara District, Brunei. The population was 3,118 in 2016. It is one of the villages within Mukim Sengkurong. The postcode is BG2321.

== Etymology ==
Tanjung Nangka is one of the most unique village names in Brunei. As is customary, Brunei's villages either had a number of names assigned to them in the past or the village itself had numerous place names, but only one was chosen to serve as the village's name. There were three prior names for Kampong Tanjung Nangka, but none of them are now in use. Most significantly, each name had a connection to a tree. Kampong Temiang is the first of the village's three prehistoric names. One of the bamboo species, referred to in Brunei as temiang, used to be a common sight in the village.

Another name for the area was Kampong Kayu Tinggi, which was derived from a very tall tree nearby (kayu tinggi means high wood). No one is aware of the identify of the tree, although it is claimed to have red, green, and black colored bark. Kampong Binjai Kumit is the final name. Local fruit known as binjai belongs to the same family as the mango. In this instance, a guy by the name of Kumit owned the binjai tree. Once more, it was claimed that the tree was exceptional, with finer fruits, a larger fruit size, and a taller tree than typical binjai trees.

The area's nangka (jackfruit) tree served as the inspiration for the ultimate name of Kampong Tanjung Nangka. Once more, the tree was reported as being much larger than the typical jackfruit tree. Its circumference was supposed to be twice as wide as a man's arm, and its fruits were described as being as large as a Chinese vase of salted eggs and weighing up to 30 kilograms (66 lb). Several people from the nearby rural region came to visit the tree because it became so well-known. It was believed that a few people were drawn to it and chose to stay there in the anticipation that their luck may change there.

== Telaga Raden Bisa ==
This village has a legendary story, which is Telaga Raden Bisa. It is said that this well has water that can cure various diseases if they bathe or drink it. According to the book The Golden Warisan Brunei Darussalam Volume 2, once upon a time, it was said that there was a family of three brothers who lost their mother because she died after giving birth to the youngest child in the family. The eldest brother is called Raden, the middle one is called Ugang and the youngest is called Musa. One day, while their father was growing sugarcane to make sugar, he found a plant growing in the burning fire known as the windward tree. It is said that it can bring good luck to those who own it.

Then their father divided the plant into three parts where Raden got the roots, Ugang got the stalks, while Musa got the leaves. Then their father suggested that they eat their respective portions. When the three of them grew up, Raden was the person most feared by the villagers because his body could poison others, but not his family. He can poison people by touching them and when he walks, the grass will die. If you go to the river fish can die. Since then, he is known as Raden Bisa. Ugang became a strong person while Musa was a hard worker. Both of them left the village to earn a living.

Since Raden Bisa's body can poison people and the environment, he finally agreed to leave his hometown and live in the forest. Over time, he felt lonely and asked his siblings to end his life. His brothers were reluctant to fulfill the request but Raden Bisa threatened to kill everyone in the village. Reluctantly, Raden Bisa was killed after a spear was thrown into Raden Bisa's chest and he fell down near the well. There are other sources that say Ugang threw the spear. Raden's blood could even drip into the well. Even though Raden's body is poisonous, the well water that has dripped Raden Bisa's blood is said to be healing water and can cure various types of diseases. This well still exists to this day, which is in Kampong Tanjong Nangka. According to Ketua Kampong Tanjong Nangka, plans will be made to turn Wasai Telaga Raden Bisa into a Leisure Park.

== Notable people ==
- Abdul Hamid Bakal (1939 - 2024), Muslim scholar and politician
