= Kampong Pasai =

- Village
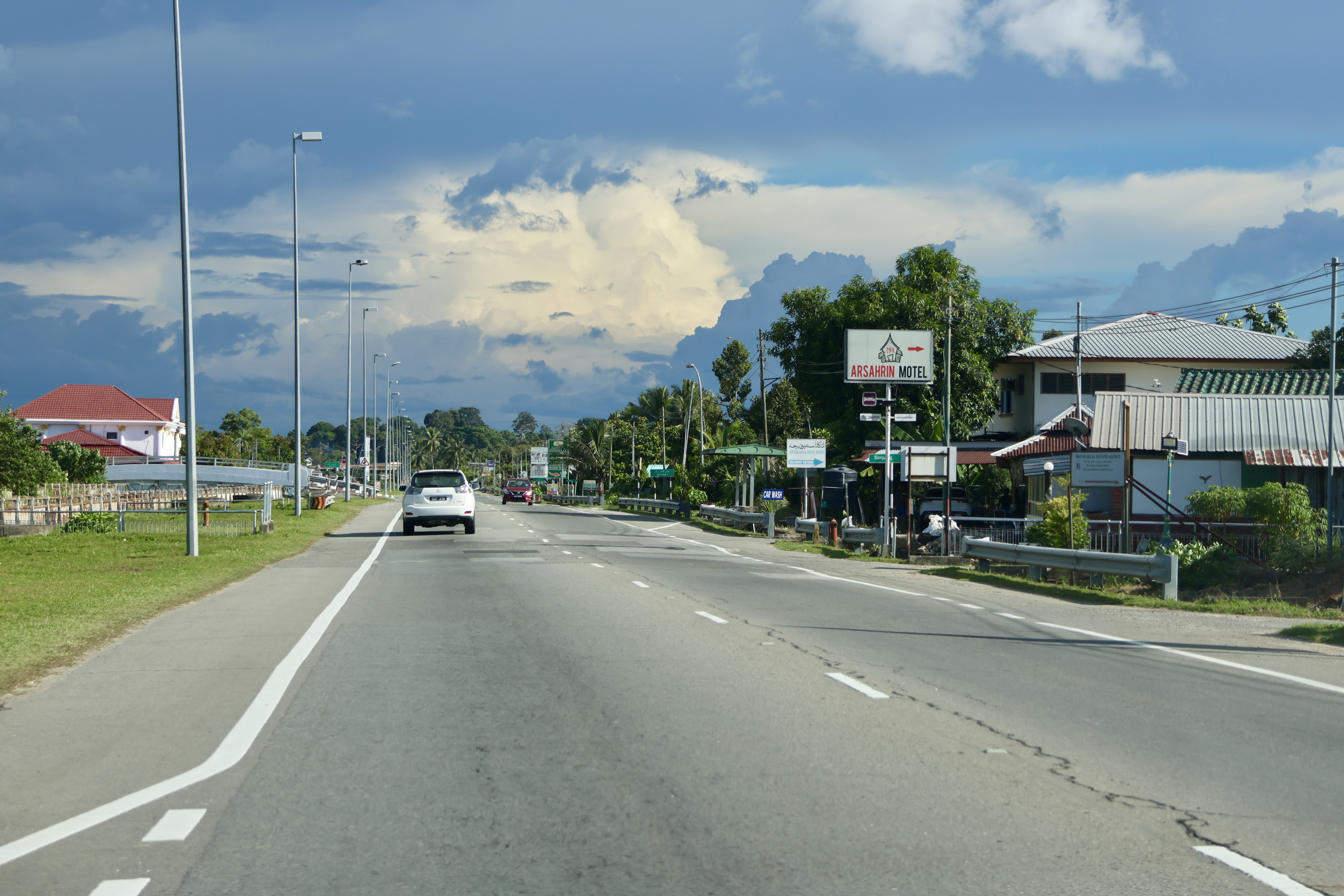
- Jalan Mulaut - Limau Manis

- Location in Brunei
- Coordinates: 4°53′03″N 114°50′42″E
- Country: Brunei
- District: Brunei-Muara
- Mukim: Sengkurong

Population (2016)
  - Total: 2,204
- Time zone: UTC+8 (BNT)
- Postcode: BG1221

Kampong Pasai is a village in Brunei-Muara District, Brunei. The population was 2,204 in 2016. It is one of the villages within Mukim Sengkurong. The postcode is BG1221.
