= Contemporary mosque architecture =

Type of architecture used in some mosques

Contemporary mosque architecture combines traditional elements of mosque architecture with modern aesthetics, materials and techniques. As a religious sites, mosques date back to the 7th century. Contemporary approaches combine original tradition with modernity and sustainability, reflecting advancements in architectural theory and practice.

== History ==
Historically, the architecture of mosques has been a reflection of the cultural and social context. Over the centuries, these structures have incorporated various architectural styles, ranging from the simple, modest structures of early Islam to the grand, ornate designs seen in the Ottoman, Persian, and Mughal empires.

In the 20th century, with the global spread of Modernist architecture, the design of mosques also began to change. Architects began to experiment with new materials and techniques, integrating modern aesthetics and functionality with traditional Islamic principles and motifs.

The contemporary period, however, has been marked by an even greater diversity of approaches, with many architects seeking to reinterpret and re-envision the mosque for the 21st century.

== Principles and characteristics ==
While mosques in the contemporary period continue to incorporate key elements like the mihrab (niche indicating the direction of Mecca), minaret (tower for the call to prayer), and a large, open prayer hall, they often do so in novel ways.

=== Interplay of tradition and modernity ===
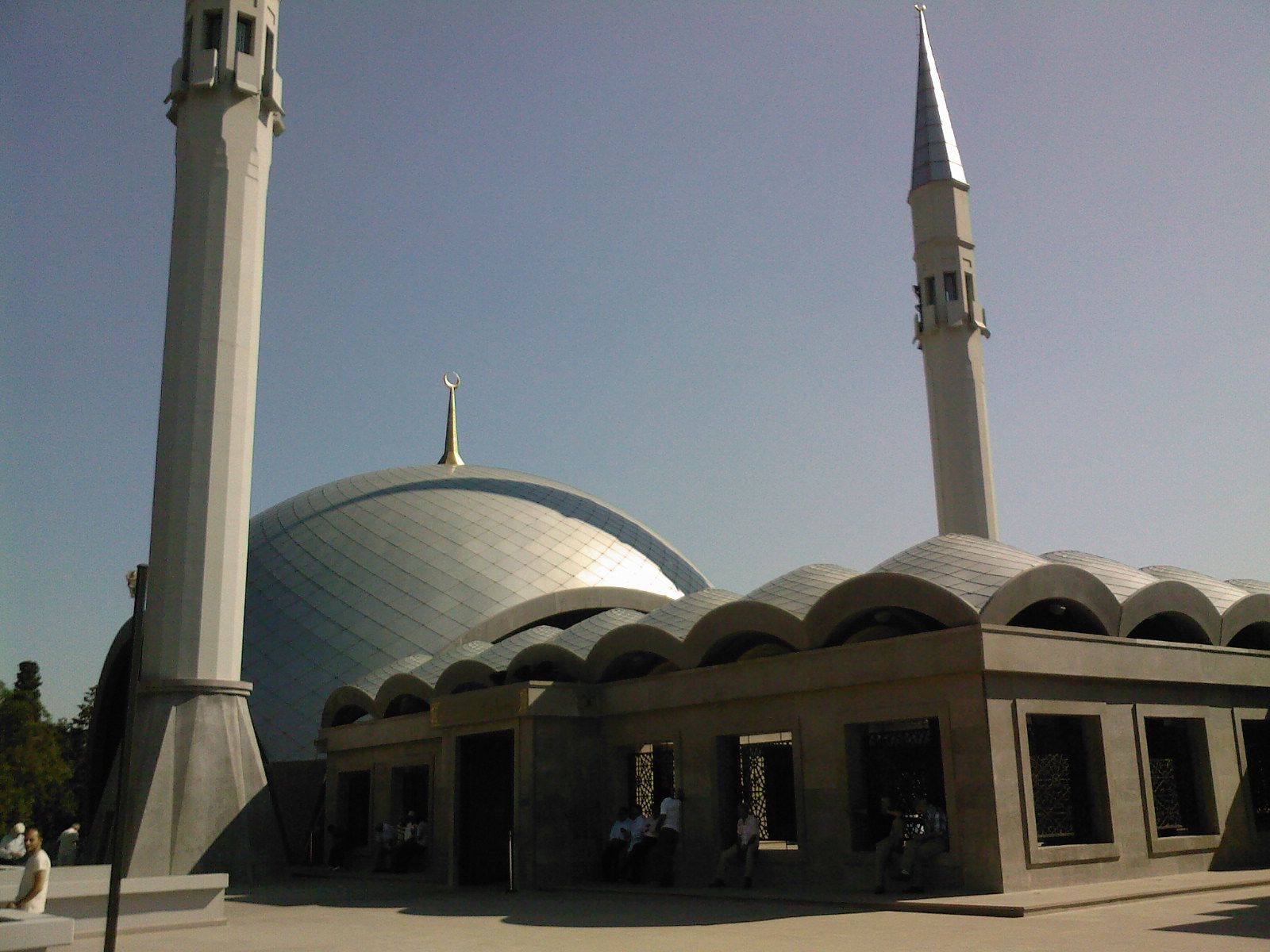
Şakirin Mosque

Contemporary mosque architecture often involves features characteristic to both the traditional and the modern. This can involve incorporating traditional Islamic geometric patterns in a modern, abstracted form or blending regional architectural styles with modernist or postmodernist design principles. Among the examples of such is Sakirin Mosque in Istanbul. Designed by Zeynep Fadillioglu, the Sakirin Mosque combines traditional Ottoman design elements with a modern aesthetic. The interior features a dome made of a semi-transparent composite material and an abstract, sculptural mihrab.

=== Use of modern materials and technology ===
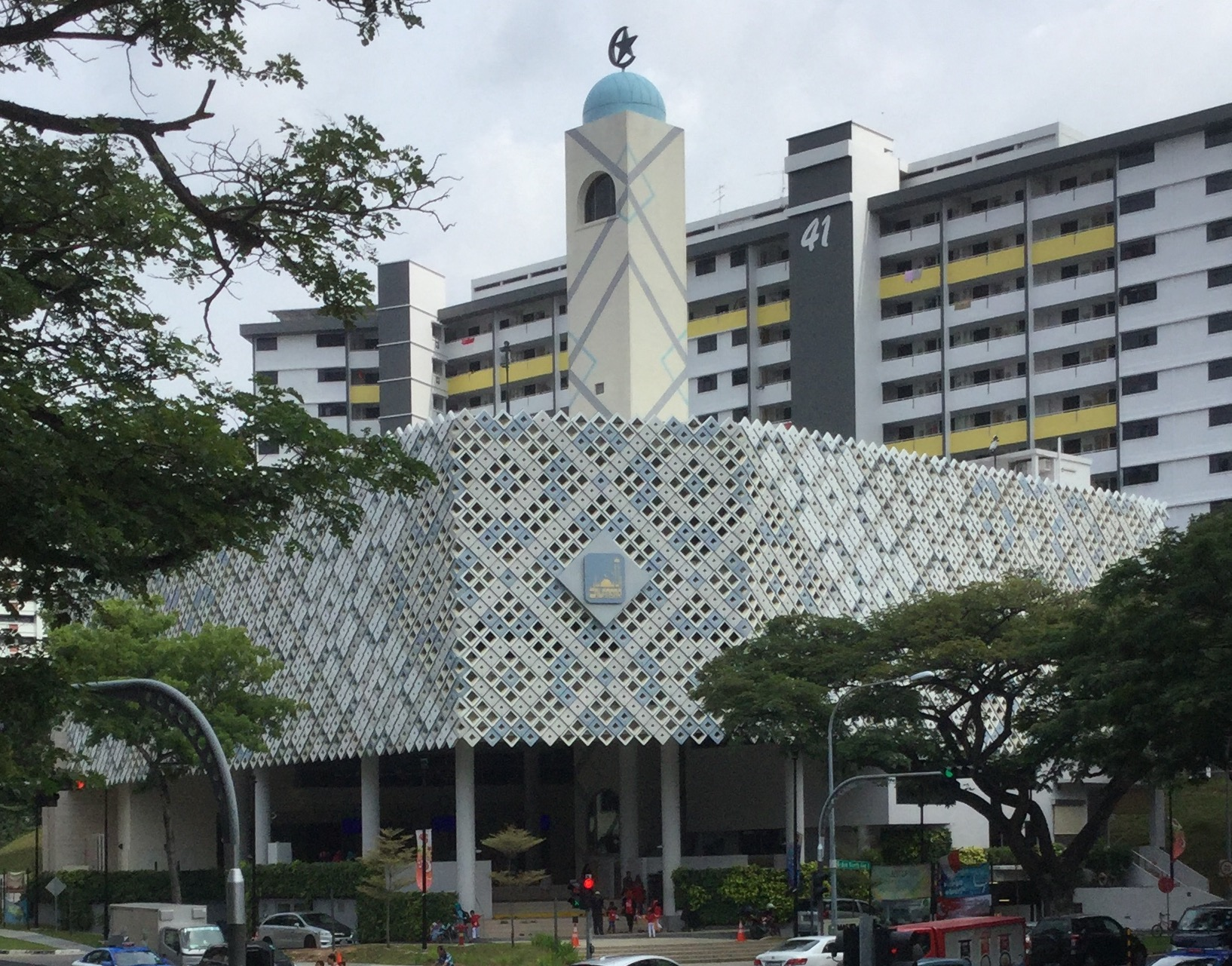
Masjid Al-Ansar

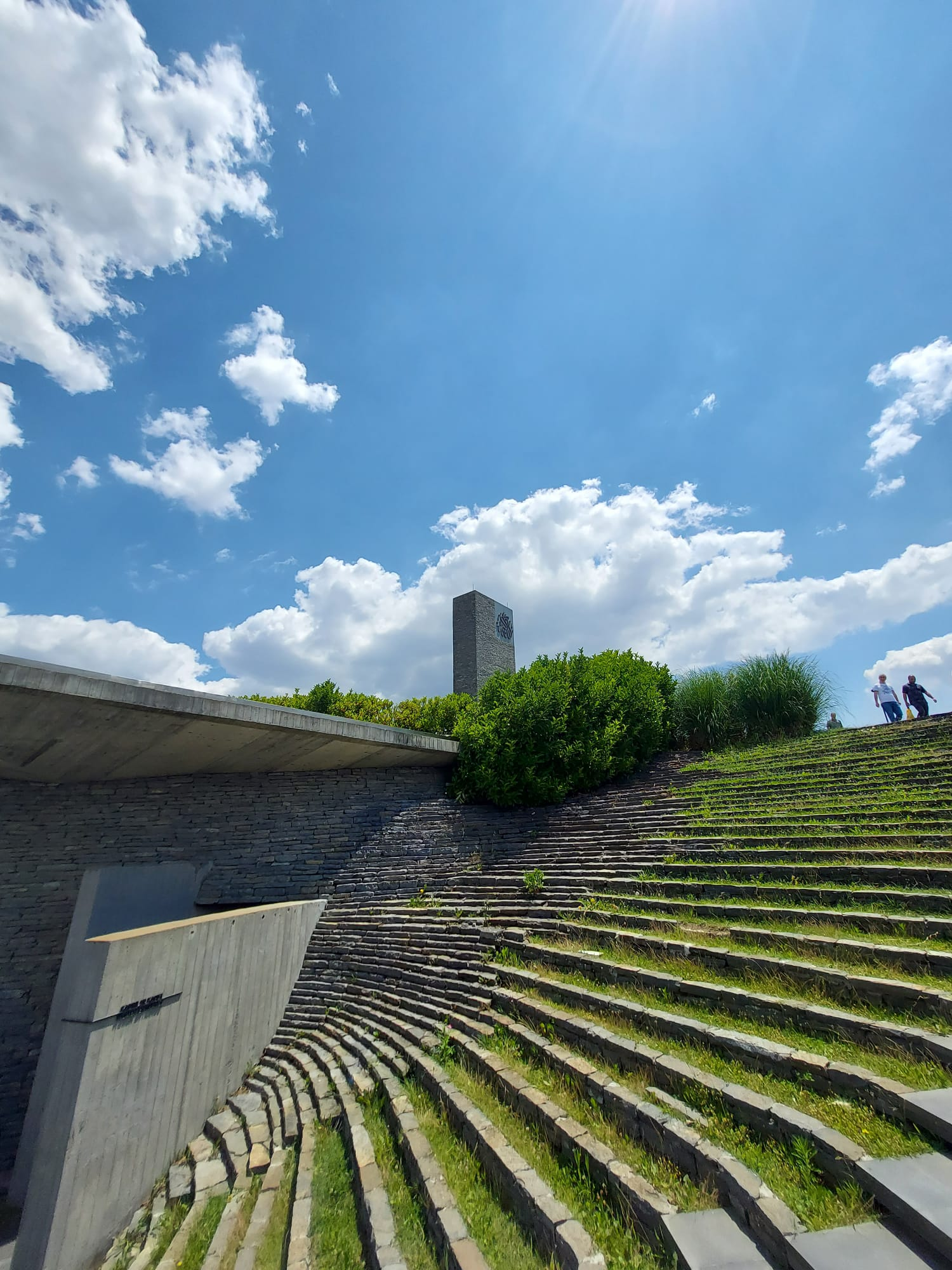
Sancaklar Mosque

Modern mosque architecture often makes use of new materials like steel, glass, and concrete, as well as advanced architectural technologies. This not only allows for greater flexibility and creativity in design but can also improve the functionality and sustainability of the building. These features can be traced in Al Ansar Mosque, reconstructed in 2015 year in Singapore.

=== Emphasis on community and multifunctionality ===
In the contemporary period, many mosques are designed to function not only as places of worship but also as community centers, offering a range of services and facilities. This has led to designs that are more inclusive and flexible, with spaces that can be adapted for various uses.

=== Sustainability ===
There is a growing emphasis on sustainable design in mosque architecture, reflecting wider trends in the architectural field. This includes the use of renewable energy sources, natural ventilation and lighting systems, water conservation measures, and materials that reduce the building's environmental impact. These principles are reflected in Sancaklar Mosque, designed by Emre Arolat Architecture, which is notable for its minimalist design and integration with the natural landscape. The mosque is built into a hillside, with a terraced courtyard that leads down to the prayer hall.
