= Masjid Al-Ansar =

Mosque in Singapore

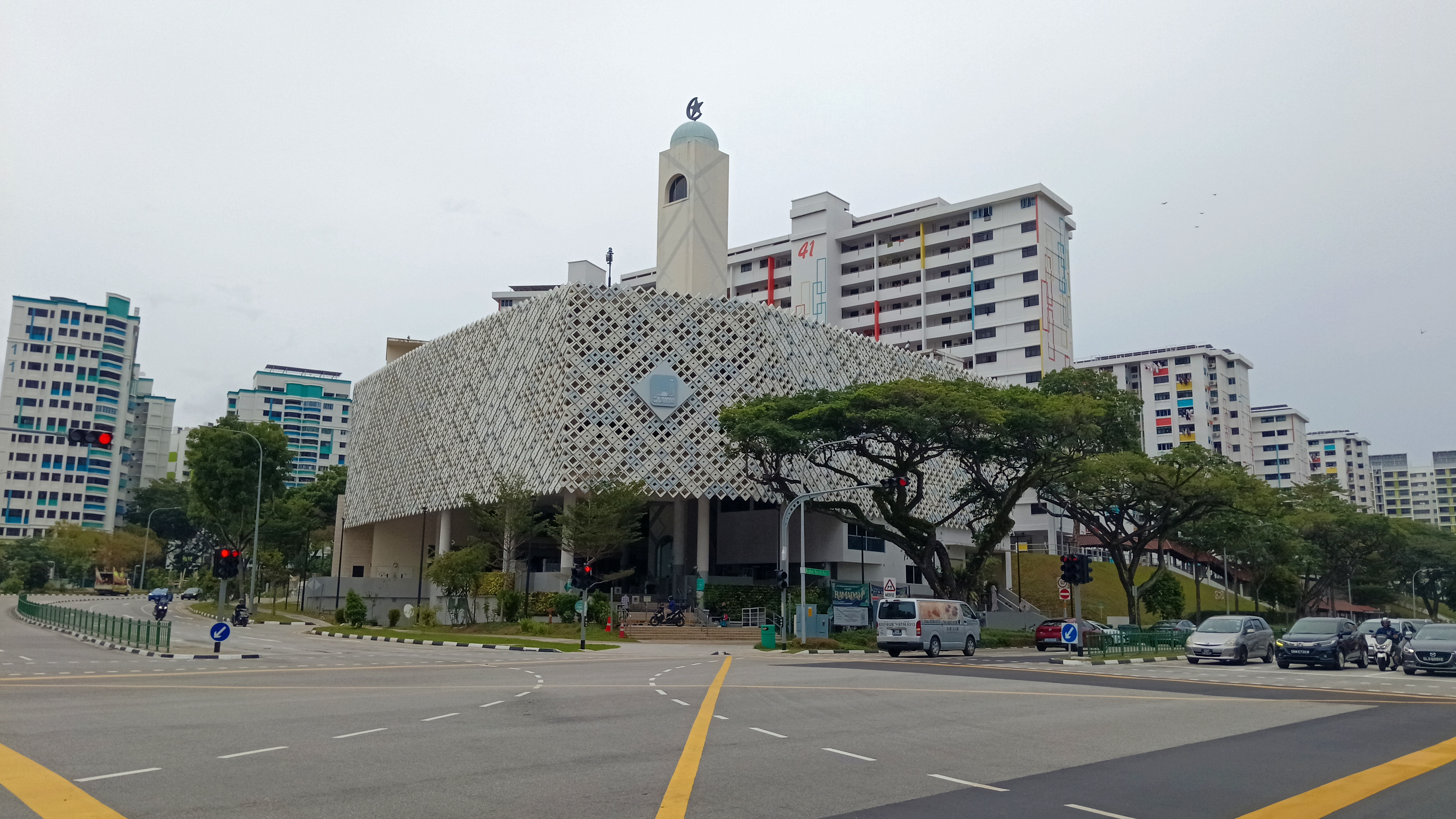

- Location in Singapore

Religion
- Affiliation: Sunni Islam

Location
- Location: 155 Bedok North Avenue 1, Singapore 469751
- Country: Singapore
- Interactive map of Masjid Al-Ansar
- Coordinates: 1.3269°N 103.9264°E

Architecture
- Type: Mosque
- Style: Modern architecture
- Completed: 1981

Specifications
- Dome: 1
- Minaret: 1

Masjid Al-Ansar (Jawi: مسجد الأنصار; romanized: Masjid al-Anṣār) is a mosque located in Bedok, Singapore. Built in 1981, the mosque is situated at the junction of Chai Chee Street and Bedok North Avenue. It is one of the major mosques in the Bedok area, especially in central Bedok, as well as the only mosque in the Chai Chee locality.

== Etymology ==
The name of the mosque, Al-Ansar, is an Arabic word which translates to "helpers." In Islamic terminology, the Ansar were a tribe that were formed from the combination of two former rival cousin tribes, Banu Aws and Banu Khazraj, after they had been united by the Islamic prophet Muhammad. They were well-known for participating in the early Islamic battles, such as the Battle of Badr and later the Conquest of Mecca. During the time of the Umayyads, the Ansar were seen as opponents of the caliphate and hence were viewed negatively by some of the Umayyad rulers. Some prominent Ansaris include Abu Ayyub al-Ansari, one of the Muslims who participated in the early conquests in Anatolia.

== History ==
Masjid Al-Ansar was built in 1981 under the first phase of the Mosque Building Fund. It was the first modern mosque in the Bedok area, and the only mosque in Chai Chee. Plans for the mosque go back to the 1970s when the mosque committee was formed after a decision to build a mosque along Chai Chee Street was approved. The mosque was originally painted green, until the early 2000s when it was repainted in a predominately blue colour scheme.

In 2012, the mosque was closed to make way for an extensive reconstruction. Meanwhile, a temporary steel surau was set up in the northern area of Bedok, which was where residents could attend the Friday prayers during the reconstruction process. The process took three years, and the mosque was reopened in 2015. Virtually nothing was left of the old structure except for the frame of the minaret.

In 2020, the mosque was among the many mosques that were affected by the COVID-19 pandemic and was hence closed down. After the pandemic, the mosque resumed operations as per normal.

== Gallery ==
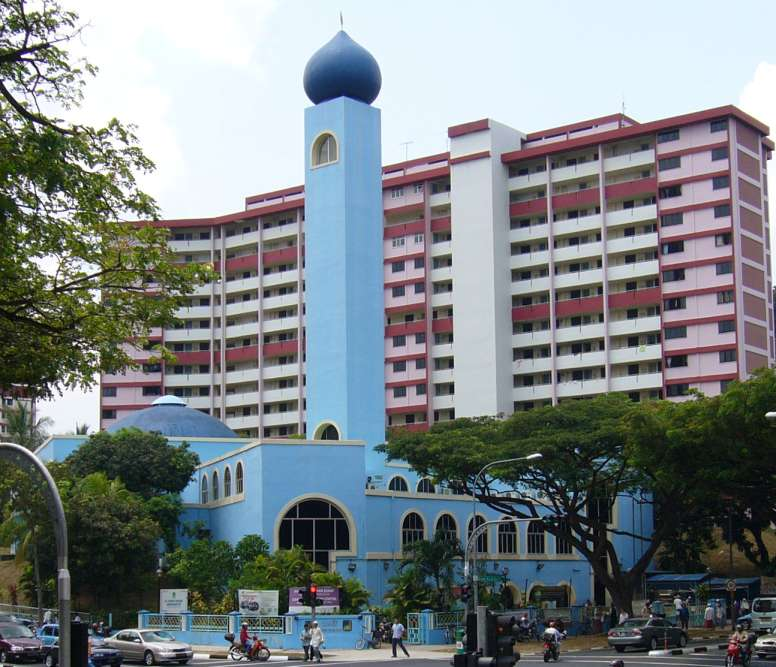
The mosque before the 2012–2015 renovations

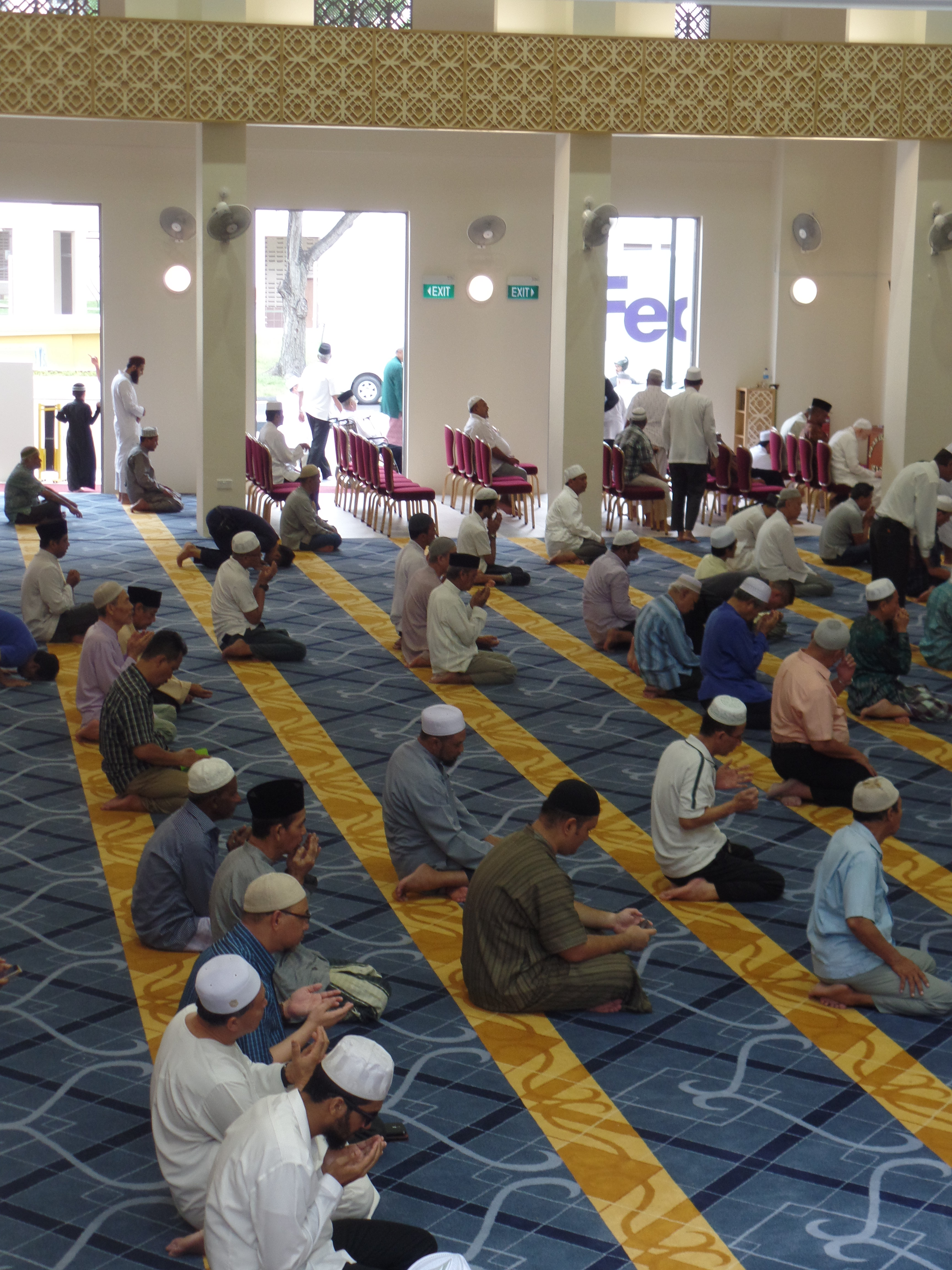
Worshippers inside the main prayer hall of the mosque

== Transportation ==
Masjid Al-Ansar is within walking distance from the Bedok Bus Interchange. The nearest MRT station would be Bedok MRT station on the East–West MRT line.

== See also ==
- List of mosques in Singapore
