= Kampong Sengkurong =

Village in Brunei

Sengkurong
- Village
- Kampong Sengkurong
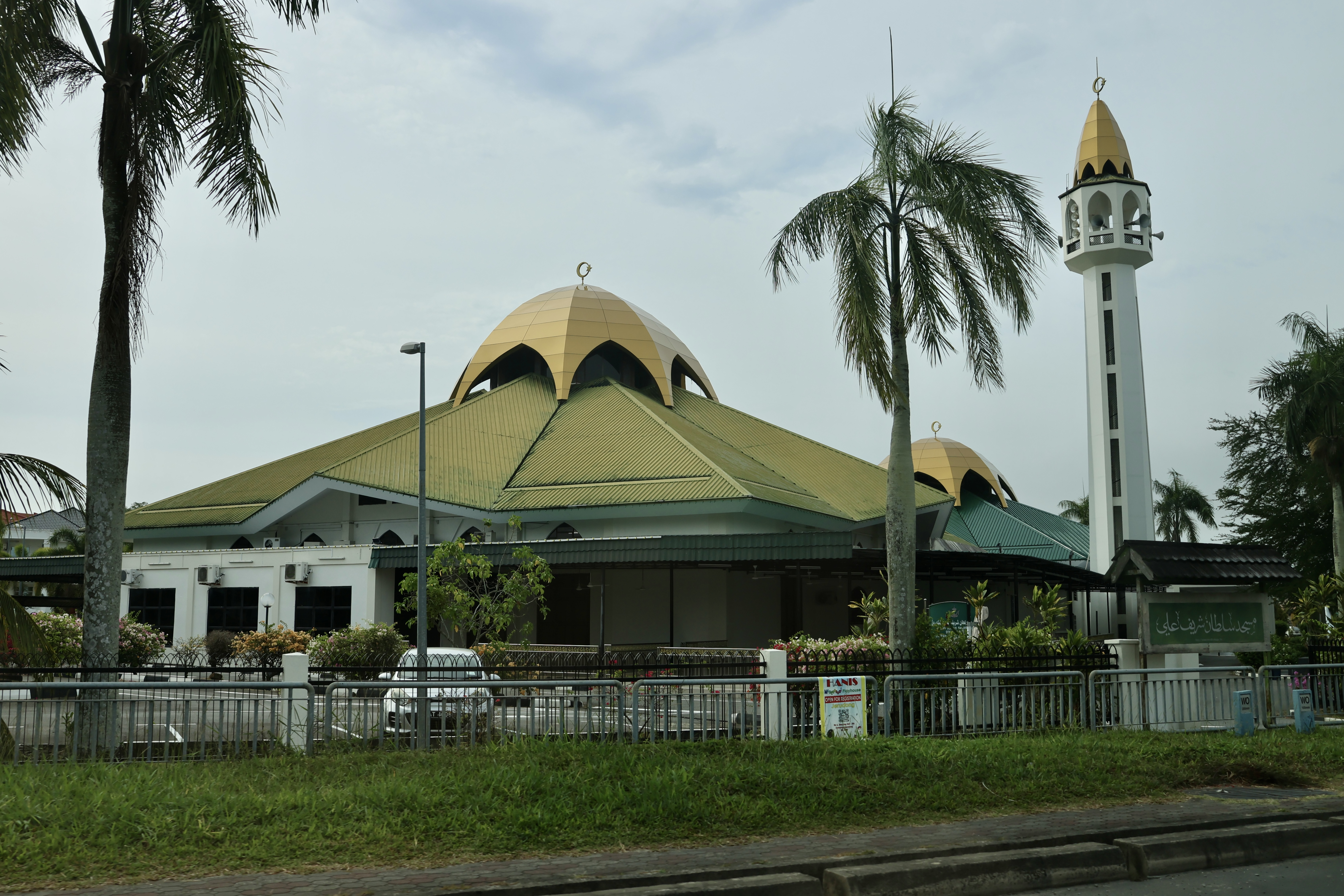
- Sultan Sharif Ali Mosque

- Location in Brunei
- Coordinates: 4°53′16″N 114°50′30″E
- Country: Brunei
- District: Brunei-Muara
- Mukim: Sengkurong

Government
  - Village head: Hanif Saman (Area A); Abd Razak Ismail (Area B)

Population (2016) (Note: see Administration section)
  - Total: 5,003
- Time zone: UTC+8 (BNT)
- Postcode: BG1121, BG1321

Kampong Sengkurong is a village in the west of Brunei-Muara District, Brunei. The total population was 5,003 in 2016.

== Etymology ==
The names Sengkurong and Bengkurong have a number of different origin stories, but according to Dusun speakers, Sengkurong means Kurong People and Bengkurong means Kurong River. In the past, the region around Sengkurong/Bengkurong was probably known as Kurong. Kurong can also refer to an enclosure. The river that once ran through the area meandered, as do most rivers. It formerly meandered so much that it virtually formed a circle around the location. According to legend, this river's meandering sections once intersected and formed a circle when flooding occurred, but this circular path was interrupted because of the river's rapid flow. Geographically speaking, the circle creates an oxbow lake that is completely cut off from the river. The name kurong, which means to be contained, survived the disappearance of the cut-off portion through time.

== Geography ==
Kampong Sengkurong is one of the villages along Jalan Tutong, a primary road which links the capital Bandar Seri Begawan to Pekan Tutong, the town of Tutong District.

== History ==
Referring to sources obtained from the Ketua Kampong Sengkurong 'A', around the 20th century, the villagers chose Kampong Mengawang as the location to build a community hall which is said to be the site of the current Sengkurong Malay Company Building. Around 1930, on the initiative of the Village Head at that time, the late Haji Tamit bin Asmat and his men, they built the Sengkurong Malay School in a joint effort, the materials of which were semi-permanent. This school was then upgraded eight years later by the government by replacing it into a permanent building.

Kampung Sengkurong 'A' became the focus of public gatherings and also became a focal point with the construction of several government buildings such as the Jerudong Prison on 1 March 1954 and the Sengkurong Police Station around 1929. There is also a brick manufacturing company in this village which was run by the Soon Lee Brickworks Company starting in the early 1940s and 1950s as the main supplier once upon a time. In 1969, on the initiative of the villagers, the Sengkurong Malay Company was established with the aim of improving the economy of its members.

This village is also often the focus when several commercial buildings are also developed in this area starting in the 1980s until now. Several infrastructures have also been created such as the Community Hall, the footbridge in front of Sengkurong Primary School, the Sayyidina Hussain Secondary School Building, sports courts and so on.

== Administration ==
For administrative purposes the village has been divided into, and established as, two village subdivisions:

Village	Population (2016)	Postcode
Kampong Sengkurong 'A'	2,617	BG1121
Kampong Sengkurong 'B'	2,386	BG1321
Total	5,003	-

Both are villages within Mukim Sengkurong.

== Economy ==
The village contains a commercial area. It is one of the few outside Bandar Seri Begawan and within Brunei-Muara District. The commercial area comprises rows of shophouses, mainly clustered in the vicinity of the intersection between Jalan Tutong and Jalan Jerudong. According to Dr. Awang Haji Abdullah Hanif, currently most of the people in his village are working with the government in addition to some working on their own such as making kalupis and handicrafts including making sticks, jewelry, machetes and daggers.

== Demography ==
According to the 2011 Population Census conducted by the Department of Economic Planning and Development (JPKE), the total population of Kampung Sengkurong 'A' is 4,553 people, consisting of 2,398 males and 2,155 females. A total of 790 residences in this village. The original residents of Kampong Sengkurong 'A' are Muslim Kedayan tribe. The existence of the Kedayan tribe in this village has existed for hundreds of years because it was the initial settlement of their ancestors. Therefore, the current population is the lineage of the previous population who inherited the land from generation to generation. It can be said that the original residents of this village come from the same lineage. That's why among the native population, the family relationship is still not so distant and interconnected.

However, around the 1980s, the mixing of the population began to be seen due to the intermarriage between the residents of this village and people who do not come from this village. Land development factors such as renting houses and selling land to outsiders also contribute to population mixing. Added to this, business activities are becoming more and more lively, making this village a shelter for workers from foreign nations. Until now, Kampong Sengkurong 'A' is no longer dominated by the Kedayan tribe, but is also inhabited by other tribes such as the Malay Brunei, Tutong, Belait and foreign workers such as from Indonesia, China, India, Bangladesh and so on.

== Infrastructure ==
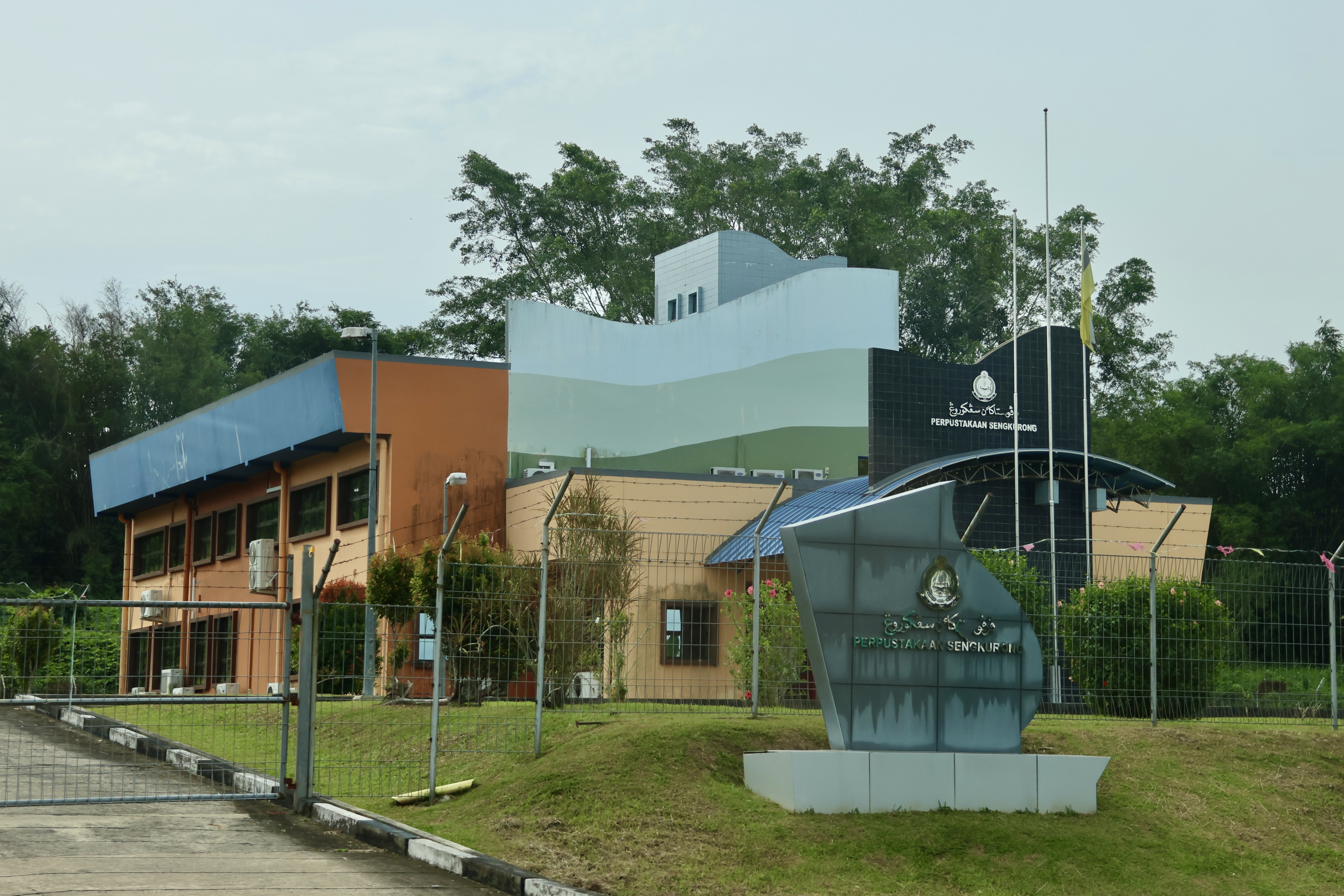
Sengkurong Library

Currently, there are several government department branch buildings in this village such as the Sengkurong Branch Electrical Services Department, the Sengkurong Postal Services Department and the Silver Jubilee Health Center Sengkurong. Sultan Sharif Ali Mosque serves Sengkurong as well as the surrounding villages. It was inaugurated by Sultan Hassanal Bolkiah on 28 February 1986. The mosque can accommodate 3,000 worshippers. Several infrastructures have also been created such as the Community Hall, the footbridge in front of a primary school, the Sayyidina Hussain Secondary School Building, sports courts and so on.

Sengkurong Primary School is the village's government primary school. It also shares grounds with Sengkurong Religious School, the village's government school for the country's Islamic religious primary education.

=== Miscellaneous ===
Other facilities located in the village include:

- Sengkurong Library
- Sengkurong Post Office
- Sengkurong Police Station

== Notable people ==
- Afindi Yati Tuah (born 1982), footballer for Kota Ranger FC

== See also ==
- Jerudong
