= Jalan Utama Berakas =

Road in Brunei

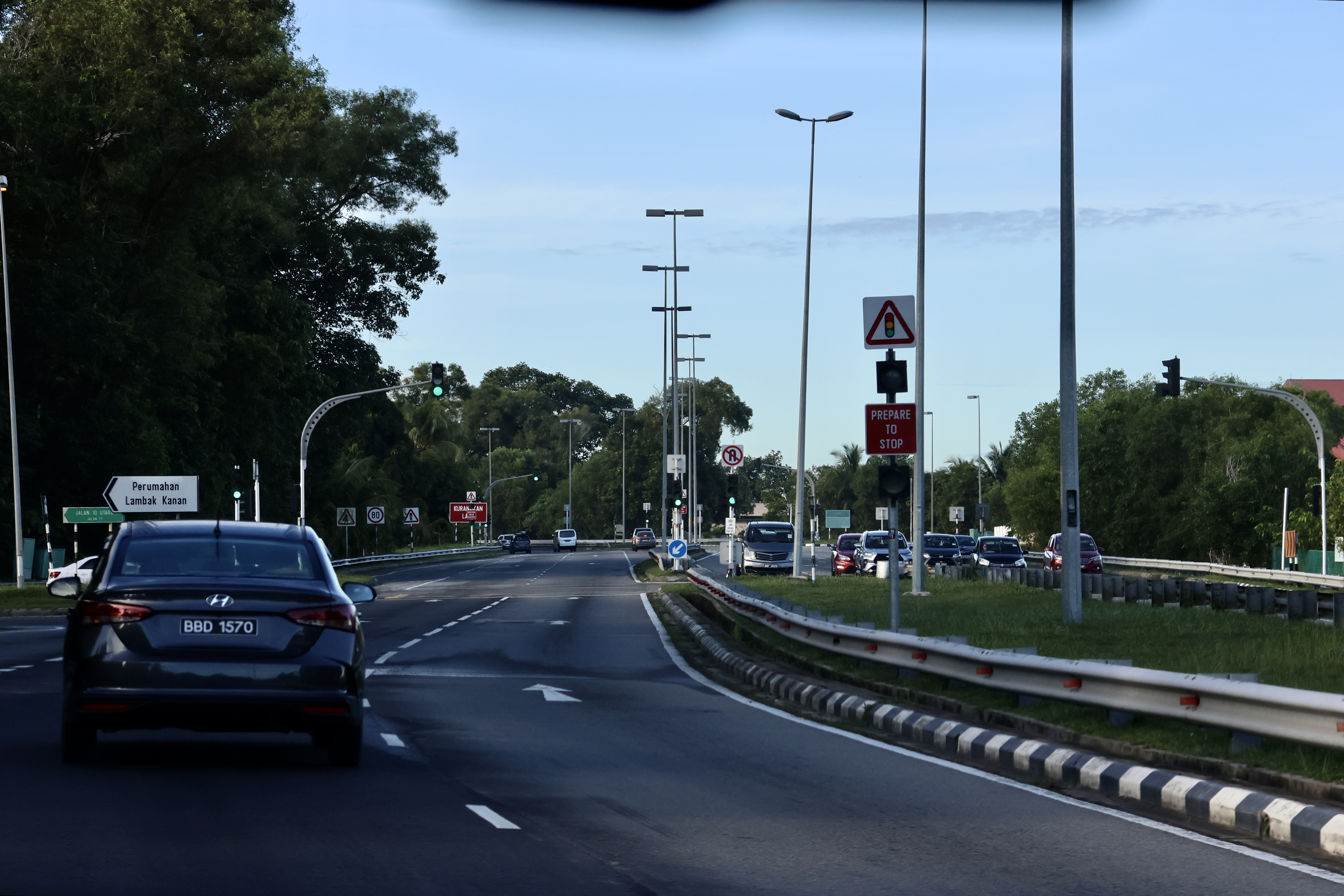

Major junctions
- North end: Lambak Kanan Industrial Estate, Berakas
- Muara–Tutong Highway; Sultan Hassanal Bolkiah Highway
- South end: Serusop Roundabout

Location
- Country: Brunei

Highway system
- Brunei National Roads System

Jalan Utama Berakas is a dual carriageway divided road in Brunei-Muara District, Brunei. The road passes through the town of Lambak Kanan in Berakas. The speed limit on the entire stretch is 80 km/h.

== Junction list ==
Mukim	Location	KM	Destinations	Notes
Berakas	Lambak Kanan	0.0	Muara-Tutong Highway; East: Pekan Muara, Serasa; West: Lambak Kiri, Jerudong, Pekan Tutong, Pekan Seria, Kuala Belait	Controlled by traffic lights
Berakas	Lambak Kanan	-.-	Jalan 10 Utara; East: Lambak Kanan, Salambigar, Tanah Jambu	Controlled by traffic lights
Berakas	Lambak Kanan	-.-	Northwest: Lambak Kanan Industrial Estate	Controlled by traffic lights
Berakas	Lambak Kanan	-.-	East: Jalan 10; Lambak Kanan Housing Estate; West: Simpang 250; Lambak, Terunjing	Controlled by traffic lights
Berakas	Lambak Kanan	-.-	Jalan Madang; Northeast: Madang, Manggis, Sungai Tilong	Controlled by traffic lights
Berakas	Lambak Kanan	-.-	Jalan Pasir Berakas; Northwest: Lambak, Terunjing	Controlled by traffic lights
Berakas	Serusop	-.-	Sultan Hassanal Bolkiah Highway; East: Manggis, Sungai Akar, Sungai Tilong, Muara; Southwest: Gadong, Bandar Seri Begawan	Controlled by traffic lights
Berakas	Serusop	-.-	East: Jalan Muara; Serusop, Sungai Tilong, Muara; West: Brunei International Airport, Terunjing Lama, Sultan Hassanal Bolkiah Highway; South: Jalan Kumbang Pasang; Gadong, Kiarong, Bandar Seri Begawan	4-way roundabout
1.000 mi = 1.609 km; 1.000 km = 0.621 mi
