= Brunei Malay Teachers Association =

Education trade union in Brunei

- Persatuan Guru-Guru Melayu Brunei فرسکوتوان كورو ۲ ملايو بروني
- Abbreviation: PGGMB
- Formation: 1937; 89 years ago
- Founder: Marsal Maun
- Type: Trade union
- Legal status: Nonprofit organisation
- Headquarters: 5th Floor, PGGMB Building, Jalan Kianggeh, Bandar Seri Begawan BSB8111, Brunei
- Coordinates: 4.8896630°N 114.9438756°E
- Members: 2,500 (2005)
- Secretary General: Mustapa Masri
- President: Abdul Alim Othman
- Chairman: Jamal Kahar
- Website: pggmb.org.bn

The Brunei Malay Teachers Association (PGGMB (Note: The abbreviations PGGMB and BMTA, which come from the organisation's names in Malay and English, respectively, are interchangeable.) or Persatuan Guru-Guru Melayu Brunei) was founded in 1937 and became a legally recognised nonprofit union with a democratic style of leadership in 1939. The founding members of PGGMB, who are also educators who have earned their degrees from the Sultan Idris Training College (SITC), took the initiative to start the organisation. It broadened its activities following World War II by creating a cooperative to promote Malay involvement in business and was instrumental in the founding of Barisan Pemuda (BARIP), Brunei's first nationalist organisation.

== History ==
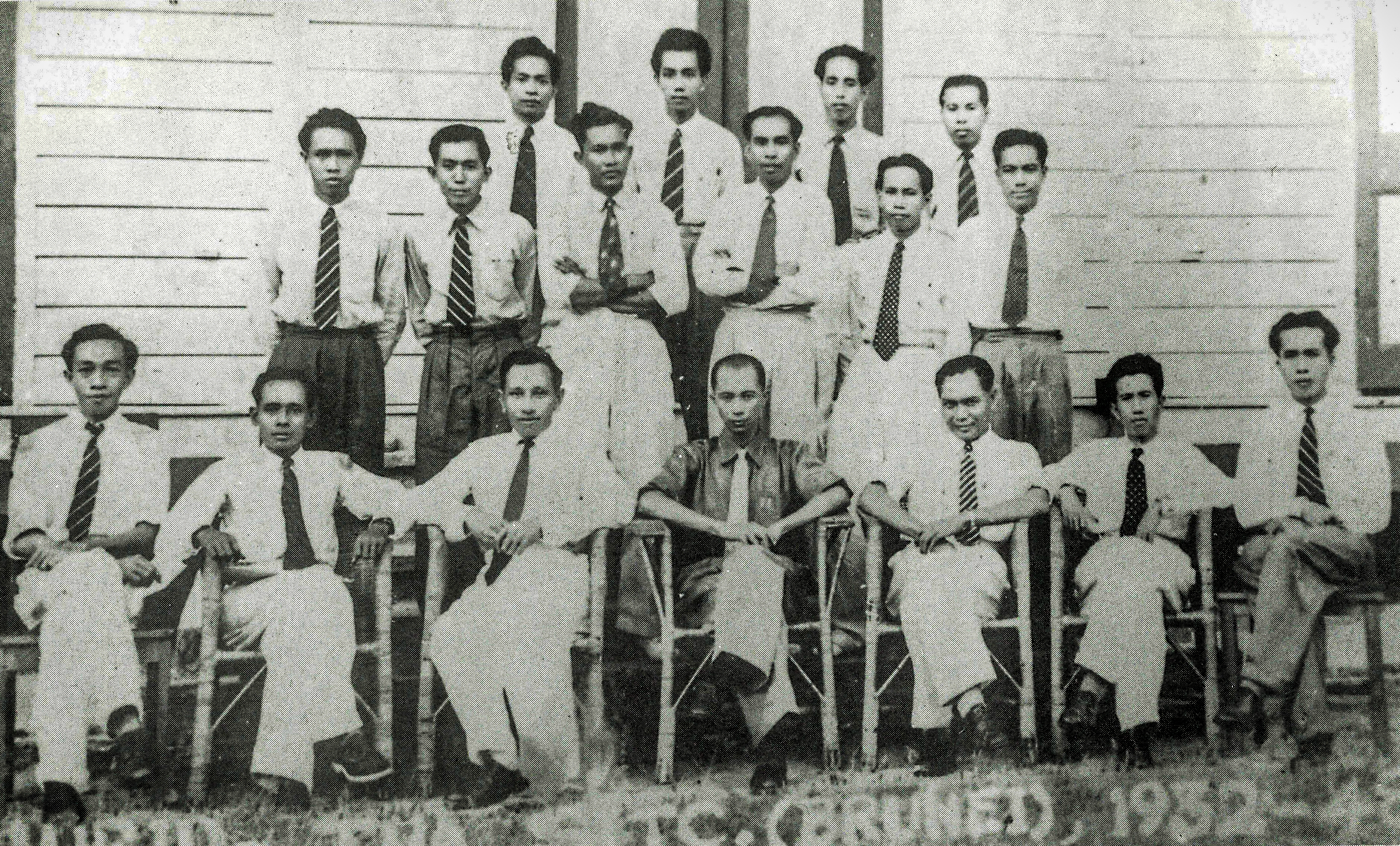
Group photo of Bruneian teachers at SITC taken between 1932 and 1948

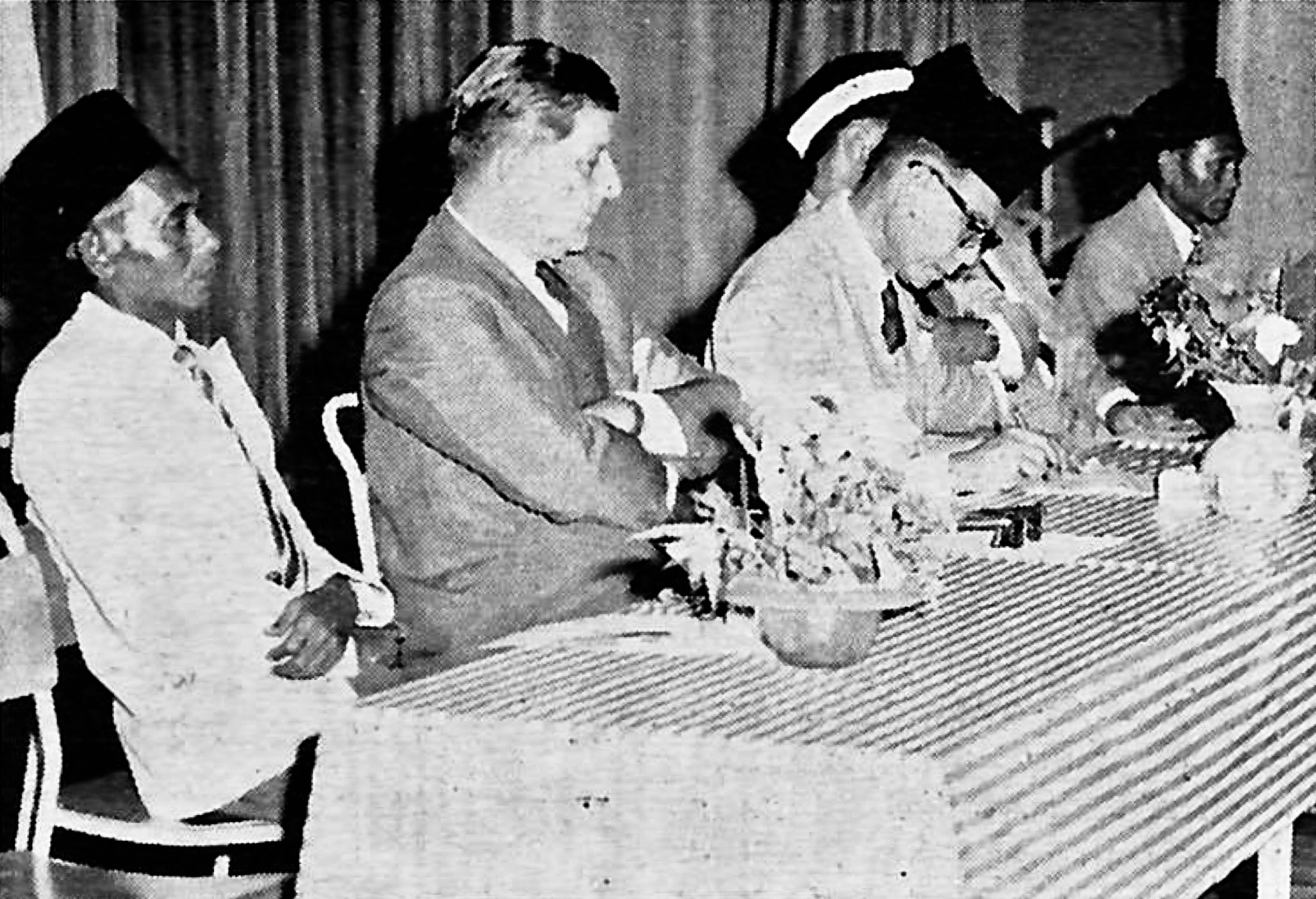
Othman Bidin, Sir Dennis White and Ibrahim Jahfar at the PGGMB conference in 1960

The PGGMB was founded in the mid-1930s with the goal of enhancing the well-being and professional status of Malay educators in Brunei. PGGMB was founded by Marsal Maun, with other key founding members being Othman Bidin, Basir Taha, and Pengiran Muhammad Ali, all graduates of the SITC in Tanjong Malim, Perak. (Note: Zainal Abidin Ali served as this organisation's initial "advisor.") Through the establishment of the Majalah Guru magazine in 1938, these members preserved regional ties and shared educational resources. After World War II, PGGMB reformed to improve the living standards of Malay teachers by founding the Iktisad Guru-Guru Melayu Brunei (IGGMB) cooperative. Additionally, the association played a crucial role in the establishment of Brunei's first nationalist group, BARIP, further solidifying its influence in the socio-political landscape.

Despite its initial focus on welfare and education, PGGMB became a significant player in fostering Malay nationalism and assisting the emergence of post-World War II political groups. The organisation strengthened its impact in 1939 by helping to launch the Brunei Malay Association (Kesatuan Melayu Brunei; KMB). After the war, BARIP overshadowed PGGMB, but following the 1948 Societies Enactment, which restricted political activities, BARIP was dissolved and transitioned into a socio-cultural organisation. In this context, PGGMB emerged as a vital voice, becoming a prominent critic of the government and establishing itself at the forefront of Brunei's sociopolitical discourse. The association gained further political prominence in the 1950s when some of its members became active in the State Council, reflecting its growing influence beyond its original educational objectives.

Pengiran Muhammad Ali was a key figure in establishing the PGGMB's Syarikat Kerjasama dan Bantu-Membantu (SKS & BM), which was officially registered on 14 January 1953. The primary aim of this cooperative was to train PGGMB members to work together and provide mutual assistance in achieving specific goals by borrowing from a communal savings fund. To promote active participation, every new member of PGGMB was required to join the cooperative and contribute a minimum monthly savings of B$20.

As of 2005, PGGMB comprised over 2,500 members, including teachers and educational officers. One of its key objectives is to bring together all Malay teachers under a unified body to foster consensus and facilitate more dynamic collective decision-making. The association is also dedicated to enhancing the social and economic standing of its members, originally aiming to alleviate the financial burdens of educators while elevating their social status. Furthermore, PGGMB seeks to promote educational advancement within the nation, particularly for its members and their families.

== Organisation structure ==
On 29 May 2022, during its 72nd General Assembly, the PGGMB elected new office bearers for a three-year term.

- President: Haji Awang Abdul Alim bin Haji Awang Othman
- Deputy president: Haji Badar bin Haji Ali
- Permanent chairman: Haji Jamal bin Haji Kahar
- Secretary general: Haji Mustapa bin Haji Masri
- Secretary of finance: Haji Juned bin Ramli

== Properties and investments ==
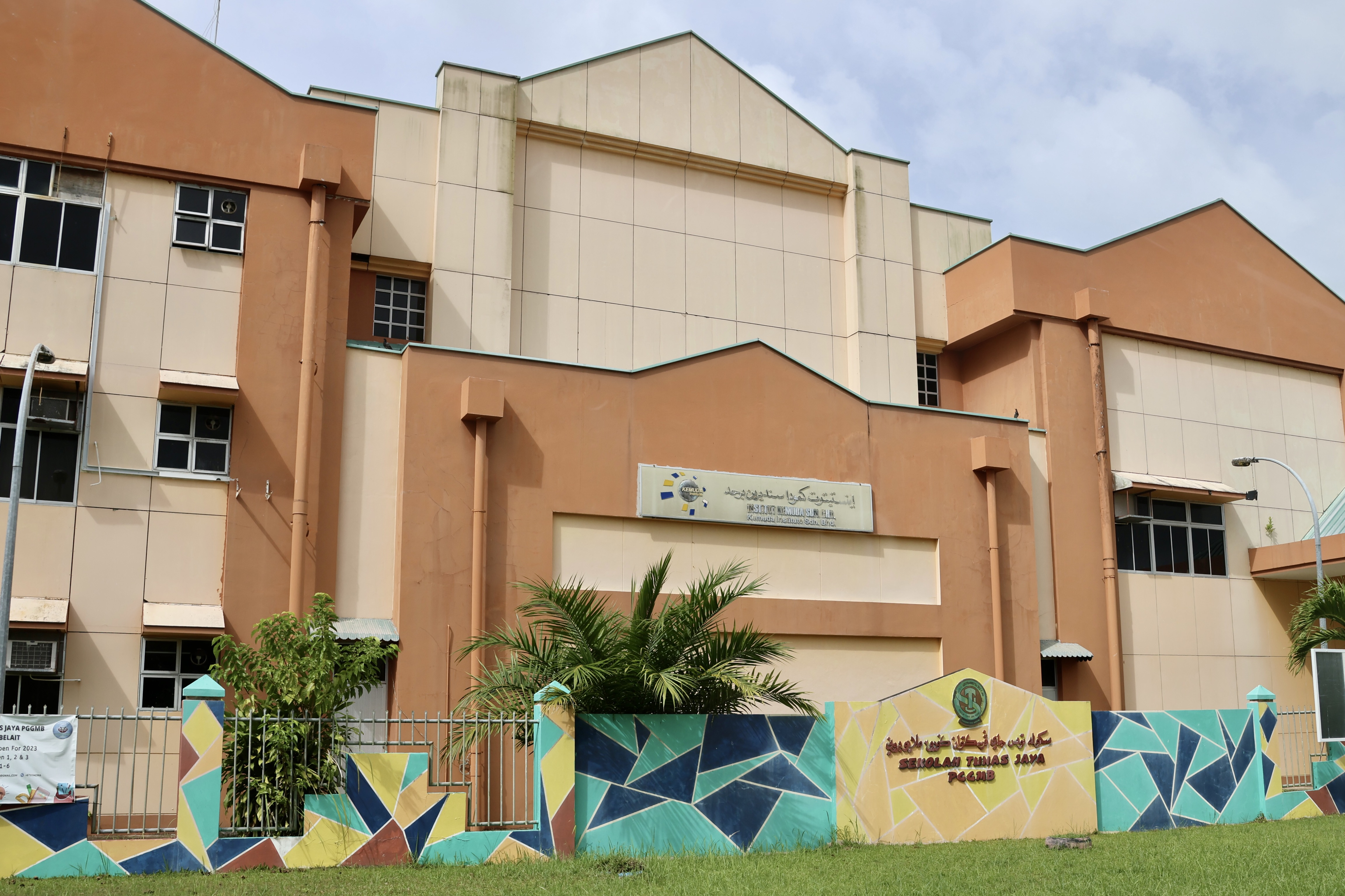
Tunas Jaya PGGMB in 2023

Since its inception, economic activities have been a primary focus of the PGGMB. One of its early initiatives was the establishment of SKS & BM, alongside the Syarikat Bangunan Guru-Guru, Syarikat Permodalan dan Pelaburan PGGMB (SPPGMB), and the IGGMB, which operated a grocery store located in the former building (now known as WISMA JAYA). The association's economic activities further expanded with the development of Taman Puri PGGMB and the establishment of the PGGMB School. This growth continued with the acquisition of three houses in May Garden in 1983 and the purchase of the Tunas Jaya PGGMB School building in Lambak Kanan in 1986.

The six-story Wisma Puri and the six-story Wisma Jaya on Jalan Pemancha were both built by PGGMB in 1991. Strategic investments undertaken by the association include the 1993 ASEAN Nestle AIJV, the 1994 acquisition of two Beribi store units, and the 1994 purchase of four houses in Kampong Sungai Hanching. Furthermore, in 1994, the Tunas Jaya PGGMB was founded in Kuala Belait. In 1995, PGGMB expanded its investment portfolio by building the PGGMB School in Sungai Akar and participating to the IBB-Nikko Investment. Additionally, the association invested in Baiduri Finance in 1996 and constructed the Tunas Jaya PGGMB School in Madang in 1995. Churiah PGGMB Travel Service was purchased by PGGMB in 1997. The establishment of PGGMB Secondary School in 2001, the investment in the Australian Technology Park in Sydney in 2000, and the construction of three shop units on Jalan Gadong, Kampong Beribi, Jangsak in 1998 all contributed to the continued prosperity of the economy.

The PGGMB water fountain monument was constructed in 1975 close to the Kianggeh Food Court to honour Sultan Hassanal Bolkiah and Queen Saleha's royal marriage in 1965.

== PGGMB headquarters ==
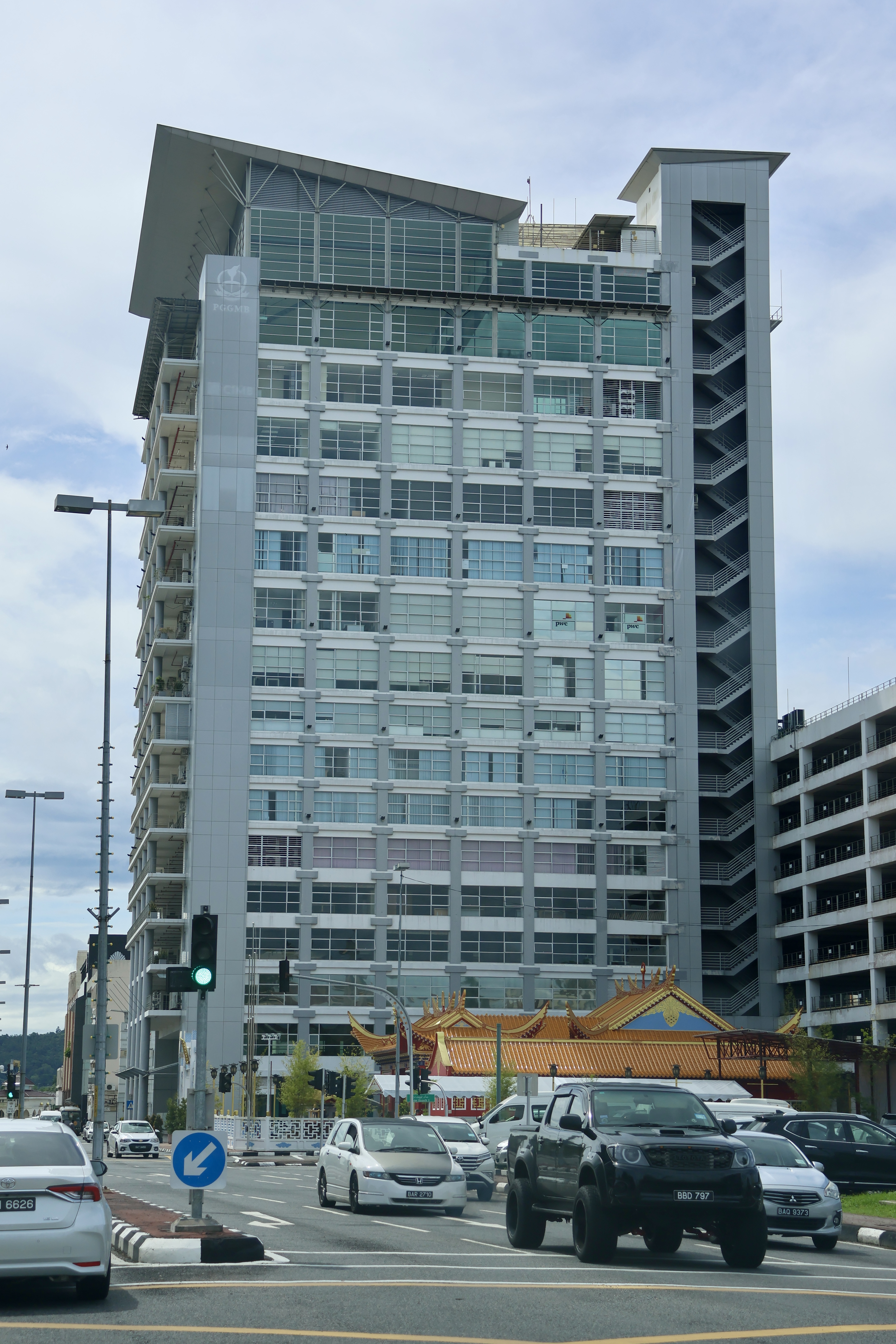
PGGMB headquarters in Pusat Bandar, Brunei

On 2 August 1963, Pengiran Bendahara Pengiran Muda Hashim officially laid the foundation stone for the Brunei Malay Teachers Building on the banks of the Kianggeh River at Jalan Kianggeh, Brunei Town, with the six-story structure projected to cost under B$1,100,000 and expected to be completed by the end of July 1964. At 7:30 p.m. on 26 February 1965, Sultan Omar Ali Saifuddien III presided over the PGGMB's silver jubilee celebration and the opening of its building. The building was the tallest and most modern structure in the city until the 1970s, being the first building to incorporate an elevator system. The building was then rebuilt in the 21st century, upgraded to a modern 17-story structure, and now stands as a landmark in Bandar Seri Begawan, the capital of Brunei. Having been officially opened in May 2002, the new B$30 million building feature commercial spaces from the ground to the second floor, multi-storey parking from levels six to eight, three cineplexes on levels three to five, service apartments on floors nine to ten, office spaces from the 11th to 14th floors, and a conference hall on the 15th floor.
