= Pengiran Muda Hashim Abdul Rahman =

Bruneian civil servant (1907–1998)

Yang Teramat Mulia Seri Paduka Pengiran Bendahara Seri Maharaja Permaisuara Pengiran Muda Hashim DK SPMB POAS PHBS
- ڤڠيرن مودا هشيم
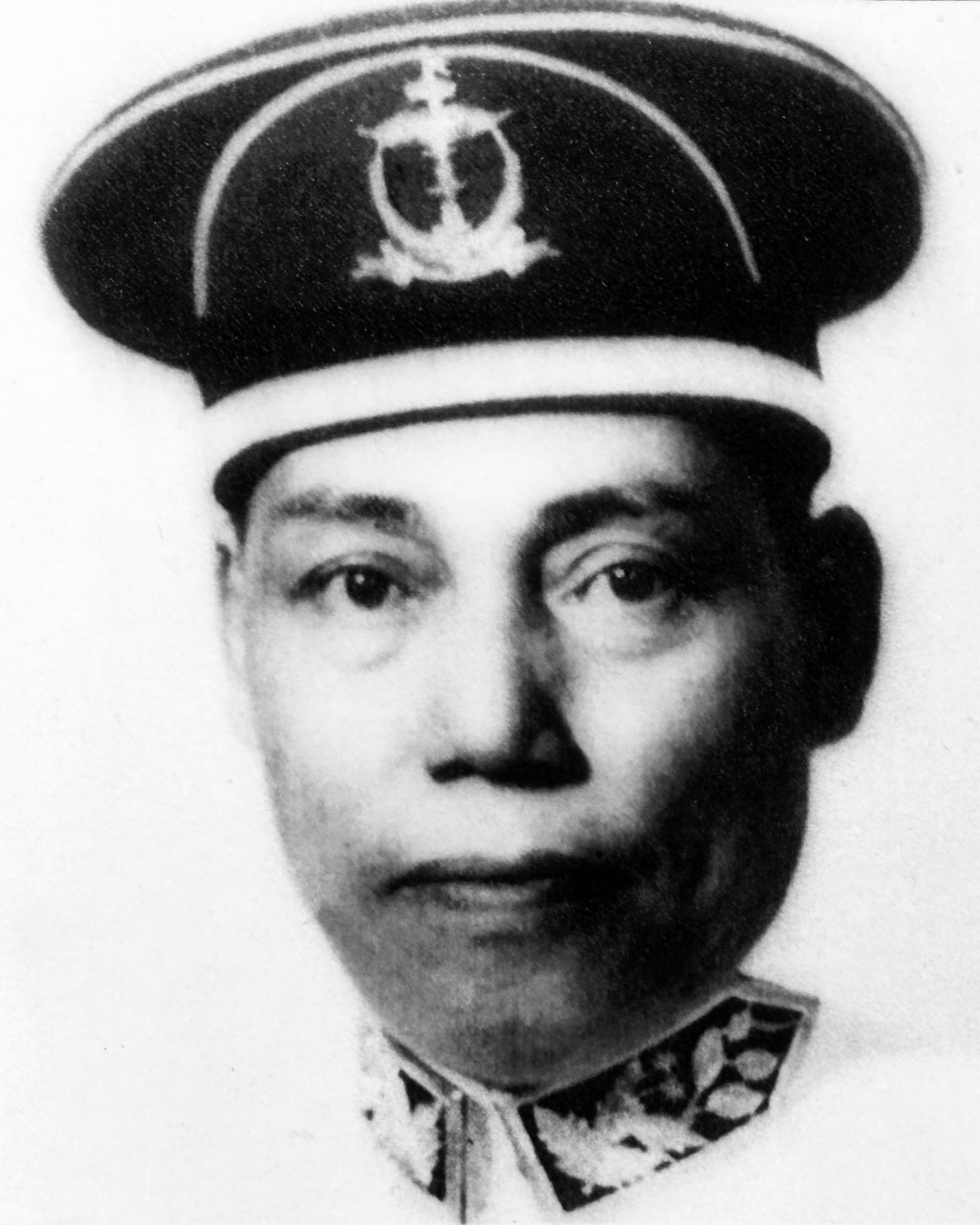
- Pengiran Muda Hashim, c. 1959
- Born: Pengiran Anak Hashim ibni Pengiran Anak Abdul Rahman; 15 August 1907; Kampong Sumbiling Lama, Brunei Town, Brunei
- Died: 27 December 1998 (aged 91); Kampong Madang, Bandar Seri Begawan, Brunei
- Resting place: Royal Mausoleum, Bandar Seri Begawan, Brunei
- Occupation: Civil servant
- Spouse: Princess Besar (m. 1928)
- Relatives: Pengiran Anak Mohamed Alam (brother); Queen Damit (sister)

Pengiran Muda Hashim (Note: The alternate spelling of his given name is "Pengiran Muda Mohamed Hashim" rather than "Pengiran Muda Hashim.") (15 August 1907 – 27 December 1998) was a noble civil servant who held the position of Pengiran Bendahara in Brunei. Serving from 1952 to 1977, this title represents the most senior rank within the wazir class of state officials. He was also the husband of Princess Besar, the daughter of Sultan Muhammad Jamalul Alam II.

== Early life and education ==
Pengiran Anak Hashim was born on 15 August 1907 in Kampong Sumbiling Lama, Brunei Town, now known as Bandar Seri Begawan. He was the son of Pengiran Anak Abdul Rahman, who served as Pengiran Bendahara for 25 years until his death during the Japanese occupation, and Pengiran Fatimah. As the son of a wazir, he belonged to a distinguished family and was the brother of Pengiran Anak Mohamed Alam, Pengiran Anak Omar Ali, Pengiran Anak Siti Kula, Pengiran Anak Mohammad, and Pengiran Anak Damit. He was also the great-grandson of Sultan Hashim Jalilul Alam Aqamaddin.

He began his early education informally at the Brunei Town Malay School in the 1920s and later pursued religious studies under the guidance of Pehin Datu Imam Haji Abdul Mokti bin Haji Nasar and Pehin Tuan Imam Abdul Jalil.

== Career ==
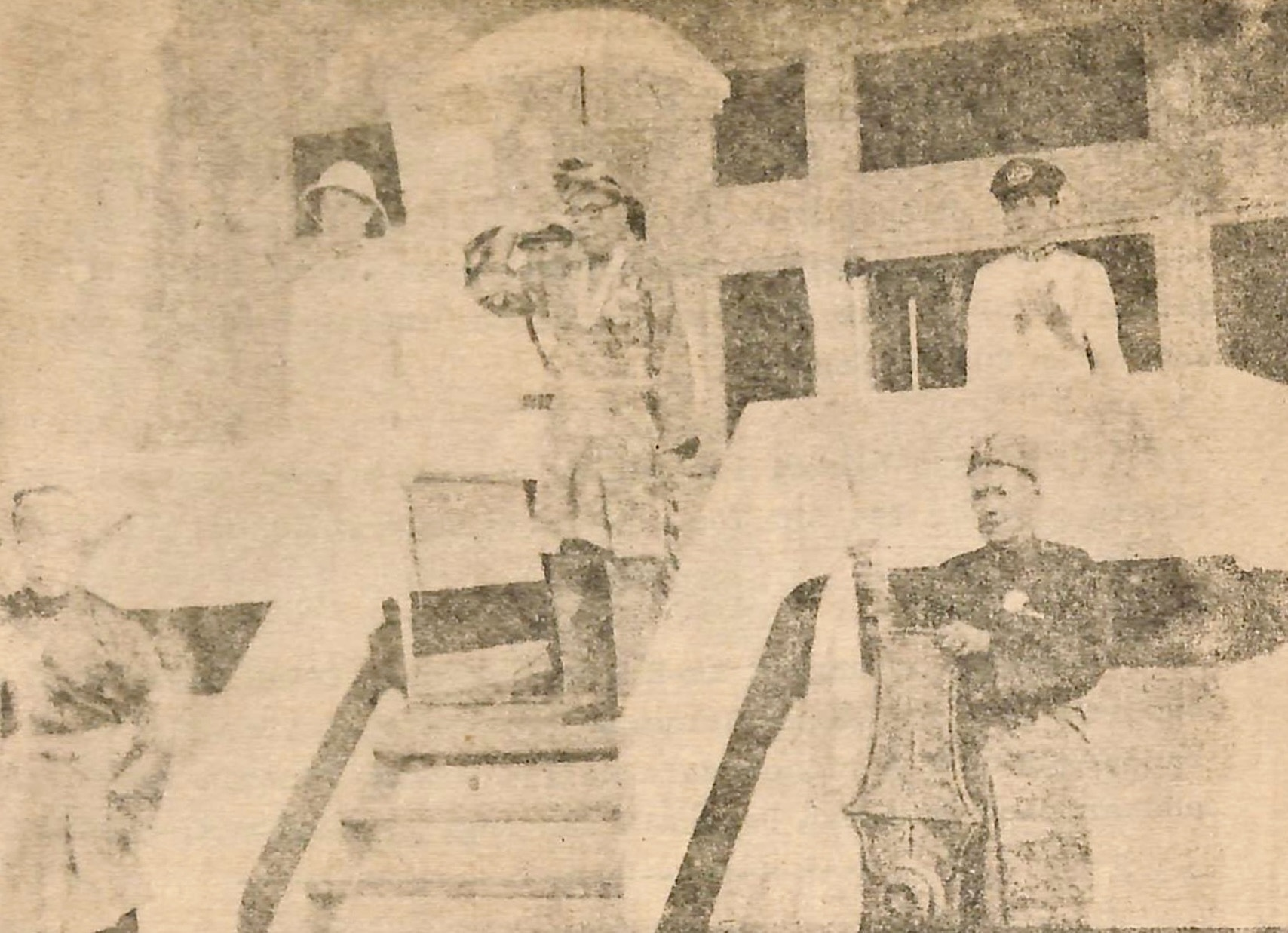
Pengiran Muda Hashim (centre), representing the sultan in 1957, alongside J.O. Gilbert (left) and Abbas Al-Sufri (right) in Brunei Town

On 28 February 1955, Pengiran Muda Hashim became a member of the State Council. He was exempted from paying customs duties on goods brought into Brunei for personal use, as per a new decree issued by Sultan Omar Ali Saifuddien III on 1 March 1956. He returned to Brunei on 14 August of that same year, accompanied by Ibrahim Mohammad Jahfar, after completing their leave in England. Followed by ob 27 August, the sultan accompanied by his family, visited USS Pine Island near Sapo Point, with Pengiran Muda Hashim, and other officials, where the warship honoured their arrival with 21-gun salute. Followed, be being a part of the State Financial Authority in 1957.

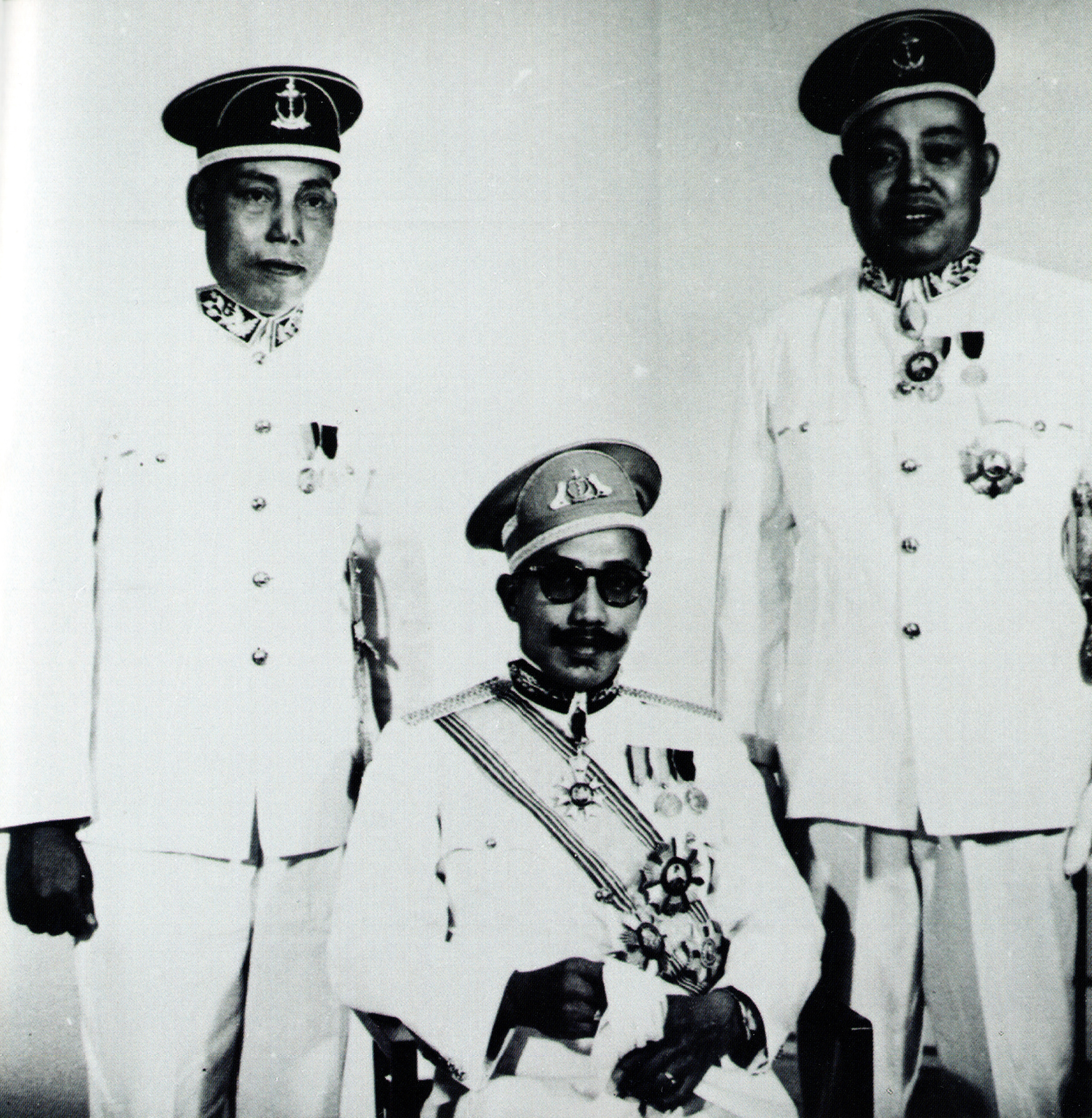
Pengiran Muda Hashim (left) Sultan Omar Ali Saifuddien III (centre) and Pengiran Anak Mohamed Alam, c. 1959

On 14 March 1959, during the absence of the sultan, who travelled to London to negotiate a written constitution for Brunei, two members of the royal family, Pengiran Muda Hashim and Pengiran Muhammad Salleh, were appointed as regents and began their duties, a role they had previously undertaken several times. Pengiran Muda Hashim travelled to Amo on 7 August to officiate the opening of a Malay school in the village. He also officiated the opening of the Kampong Jerudong Mosque on 14 August, representing the sultan of Brunei.

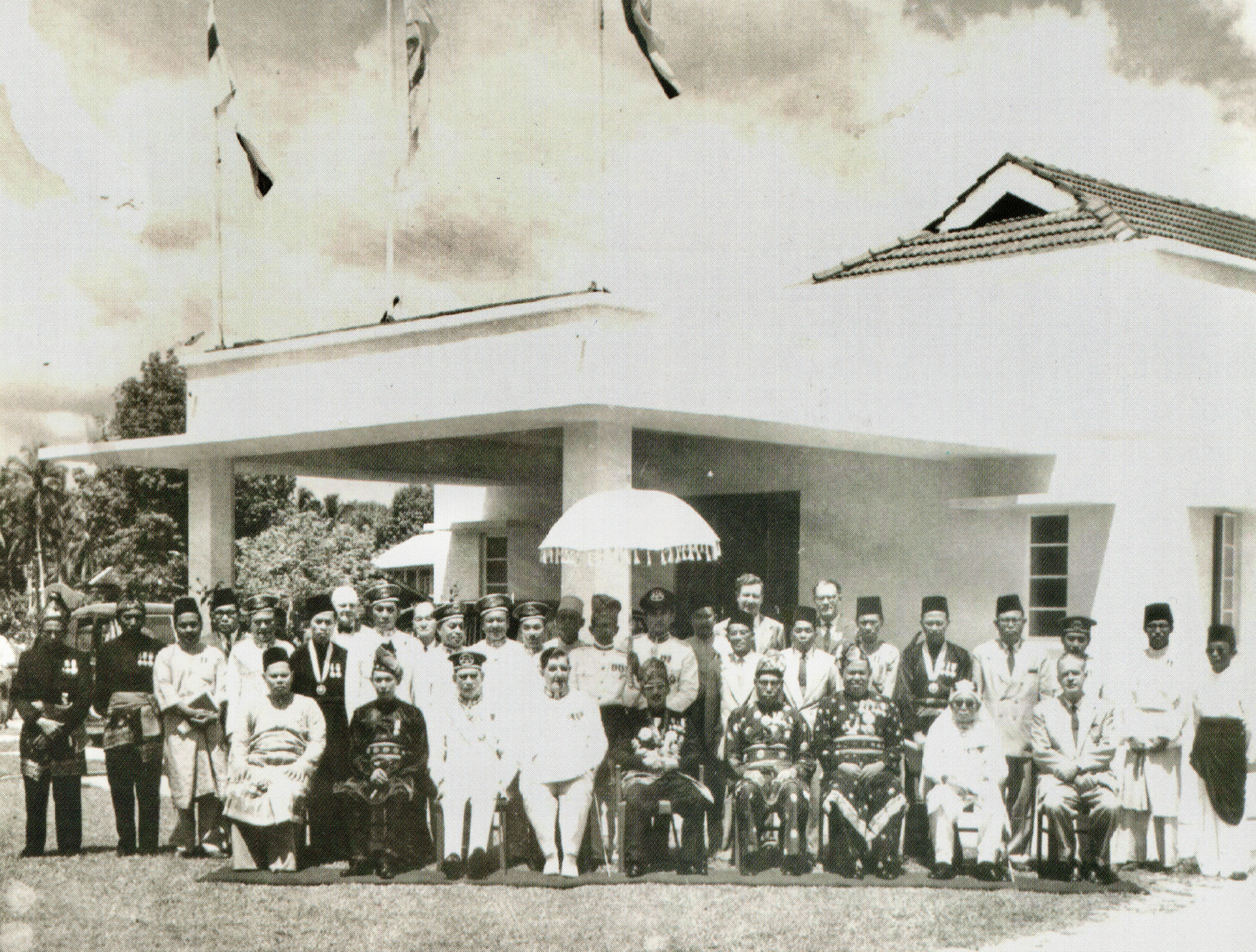
Pengiran Muda Hashim (seated fourth from the right) alongside fellow members of the 1959 LegCo

Pengiran Muda Hashim was among the dignitaries who attended the signing of Brunei's written constitution and the new agreement with the United Kingdom at the Lapau on 29 September 1959. The following month, he was appointed as a member of both the Islamic Religious Council and the Adat Istiadat Council, which were established to oversee matters related to religion, customs, and the state court. He was among the 20 individuals appointed, with Pengiran Muhammad Salleh as president of the council. Additionally, he became one of the inaugural ex-officio members of the newly established Legislative Council of Brunei (LegCo).

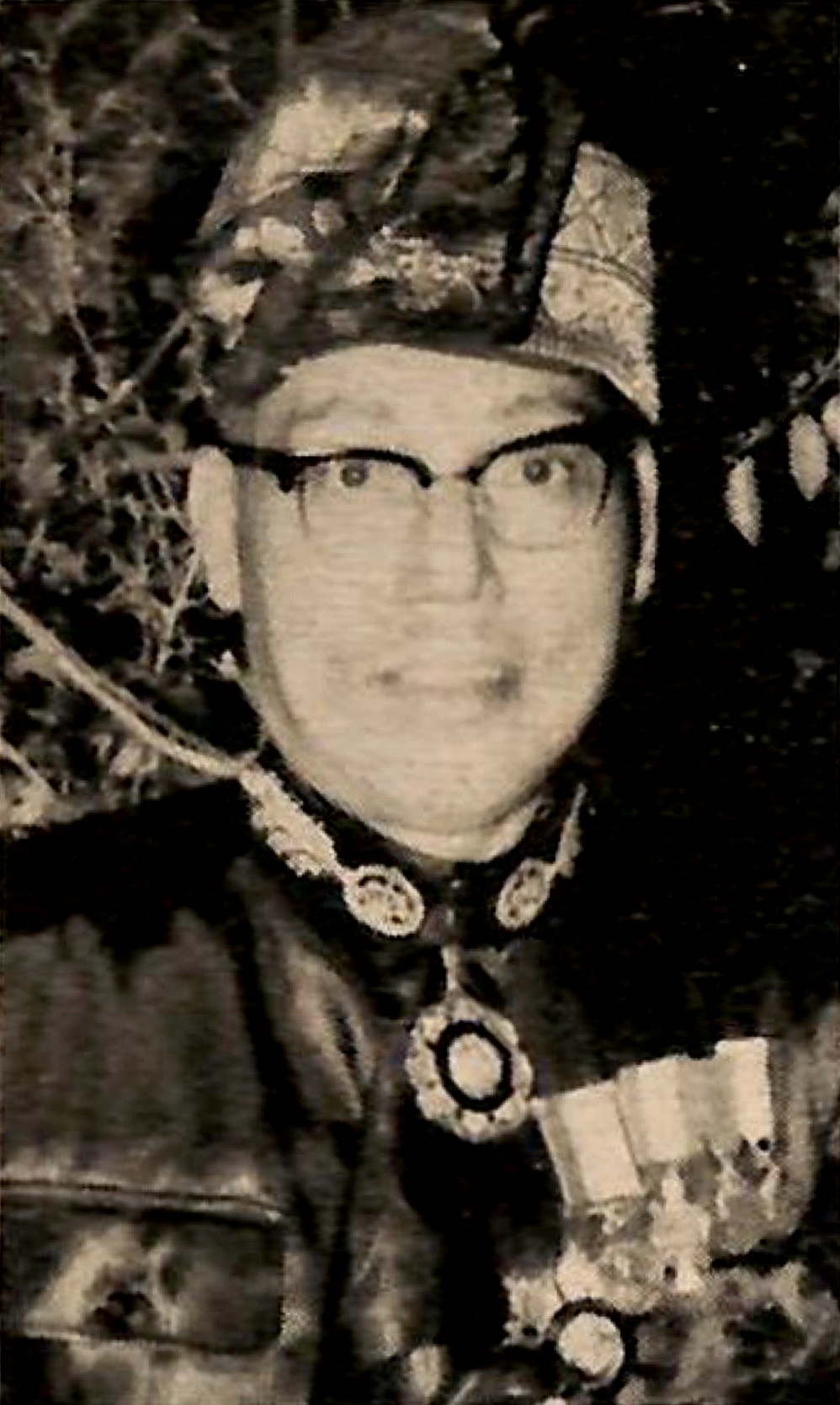
Pengiran Muda Hashim, c. 1960

On 23 April 1960, Pengiran Muda Hashim was appointed as one of the seven members of the Regency Council. In the following month, he was also appointed as a member of the Regency Council, alongside wazirs, ministers, and council members, to carry out the sultan's duties during his holiday in Malaya.

On 20 January 1961, he addressed the public to encourage peace and unity, referring to an incident in Seria involving Malayan police and local residents, where four officers were detained for allegedly injuring two Bruneian Malays at the Roxana cinema. He urged the public to remain calm and assured that the matter had been handed over to the courts for resolution. While the sultan was in Malaya, Pengiran Muda Hashim was among the people appointed to serve as acting sultan together in May. On 31 July, he officially opened the Bengkurong Malay School. He attended the instalment ceremony on 14 August in Istana Darul Hana, where Prince Hassanal Bolkiah was officially declared as the new Pengiran Muda Mahkota (Crown Prince). He was also among the distinguished guests who witnessed Brunei Malay Regiment's first-ever military parade at Padang Besar on 9 November, alongside other state officials.

Following the Brunei revolt in December, Pengiran Muda Hashim, alongside other high-ranking officials, reaffirmed their unwavering loyalty to the sultan. They vowed to sacrifice everything to combat treason and strongly condemned the rebellion led by A. M. Azahari and his followers, firmly rejecting Azahari's false claims that the uprising had the support of the Bruneian people.

On 10 June 1963, Pengiran Muda Hashim inaugurated the Bendahara Mosque on Baru-Baru Island. On 2 August, he officially laid the foundation stone for the Brunei Malay Teachers Association's building on the banks of the Kianggeh River at Jalan Kianggeh. Later in September, in the boat race held in Tutong to celebrate the sultan's birthday, he led a team of three members, finishing in fourth place.

Pengiran Muda Hashim laid the foundation stone for the Utama Mohammad Salleh Mosque in Temburong on 17 April 1965. Later that year, in September, his residence hosted various ceremonies and celebrations leading up to the royal wedding of his son, Pengiran Muda Abdul Rahman, and Princess Masna. On 16 September, he, along with his son and their entourage, departed for Istana Darussalam for the akad nikah ceremony, accompanied by the royal regalia. In December, on 20 December, acting as the deputy sultan, Pengiran Muda Hashim delivered the royal address from the throne at the Dewan Kemasyarakatan during the opening of the LegCo meeting.

On 16 April 1967, he traveled to Kuala Lumpur with Pengiran Mohammad to represent the sultan and the Brunei government at the funeral of Tuanku Munawir, the Yang di-Pertuan Besar of Negeri Sembilan. Pengiran Muda Hashim played a key role in the coronation ceremonies of Sultan Hassanal Bolkiah on 1 August 1968, as he read the proclamation of the coronation.

Pengiran Muda Hashim relinquished his noble duties as Pengiran Bendahara on 15 August 1977. Two years later, on 14 November, the title was passed on to Sultan Omar Ali Saifuddien's son, Prince Sufri Bolkiah.

== Death ==
Pengiran Muda Hashim died on 27 December 1998 at the age of 91 at his residence in Kampong Madang, Berakas.

== Personal life ==
Pengiran Anak Mohamed Alam married Princess Besar, who is the daughter of Sultan Muhammad Jamalul Alam II. Together, they had several children, including Pengiran Anak Chuchu Besar, who was bestowed the Cheteria title of Pengiran Kesuma Negara, and Pengiran Anak Ismail, who served as aide-de-camp to Sultan Omar Ali Saifuddien III. Another son, Pengiran Anak Abdul Rahman, was married to Princess Masna in 1965. Their other children included Pengiran Anak Apong and Pengiran Anak Siti Rafiah, who married Pengiran Anak Kemaluddin.

== Titles, styles and honours ==
=== Titles and styles ===
Personal standard of Pengiran Bendahara Seri Maharaja Permaisuara

On 24 August 1952, Pengiran Muda Hashim was honoured by Sultan Omar Ali Saifuddien III with the wazir title of Pengiran Bendahara Seri Maharaja Permaisuara, (Note: After his death, the title was shortened to "Pengiran Bendahara." In English, the title translates to "Prime Minister." Pengiran Bendahara held the highest authority in matters of governance, the judiciary, and Islamic affairs, serving as regent in the sultan's absence.) bearing the style Yang Teramat Mulia Seri Paduka. (Note: His full title is "Yang Teramat Mulia Seri Paduka Pengiran Bendahara Seri Maharaja Permaisuara Pengiran Muda Hashim ibni Pengiran Bendahara Pengiran Anak Abdul Rahman.") His title was superseded on 15 August 1977.

=== Honours ===
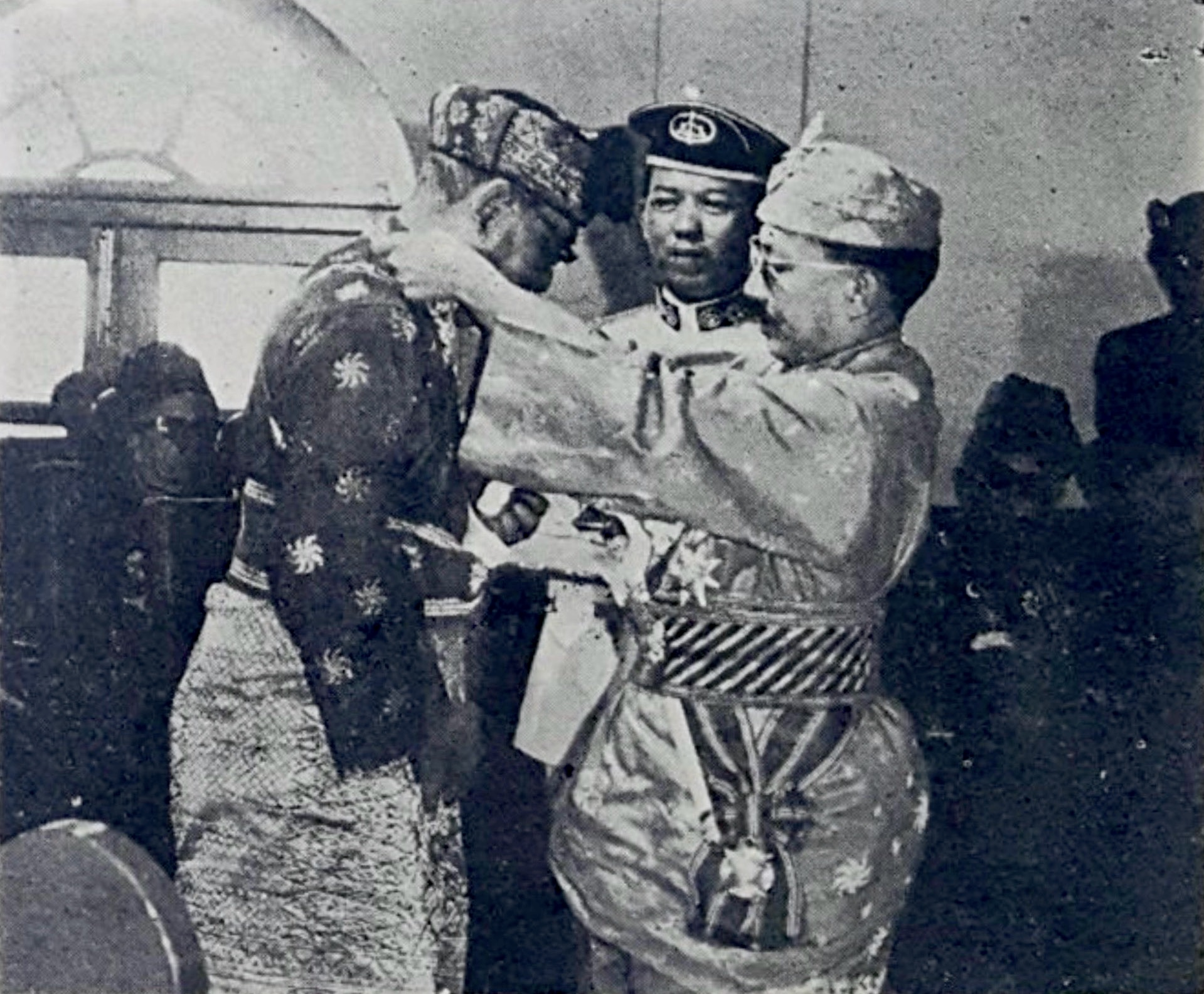
Pengiran Muda Hashim being awarded the DK by Sultan Omar Ali Saifuddien III in 1967

Pengiran Muda Hashim has been bestowed the following honours:

- Family Order of Laila Utama (DK; 23 September 1967) – Dato Laila Utama
- Family Order of Seri Utama (DK; 23 September 1962) – Dato Seri Utama
- Order of Seri Paduka Mahkota Brunei First Class (SPMB; 1966) – Dato Seri Paduka
- Order of Seri Paduka Mahkota Brunei Second Class (DPMB; 23 September 1956) – Dato Paduka
- Sultan Hassanal Bolkiah Medal (PHBS)
- Omar Ali Saifuddin Medal (POAS; 1955)
- Omar Ali Saifuddin Coronation Medal (31 May 1951)
- Coronation Medal (1 August 1968)
- Campaign Medal

=== Things named after him ===
- Bendahara Mosque, a mosque built in Baru-Baru Island.
- Jalan Bendahara, a road in Bandar Seri Begawan.
- Muda Hashim Secondary School, school in Tutong.

== Notes ==
Regnal titles
Preceded by Pengiran Anak Muhammad Yasin	Pengiran Bendahara Seri Maharaja Permaisuara; 1952–1977	Succeeded by Prince Sufri Bolkiah
