= Lambak Kanan =

Public housing estate in Brunei

Lambak Kanan RPN Lambak Kanan Kampong Perpindahan Lambak Kanan
- Public housing estate
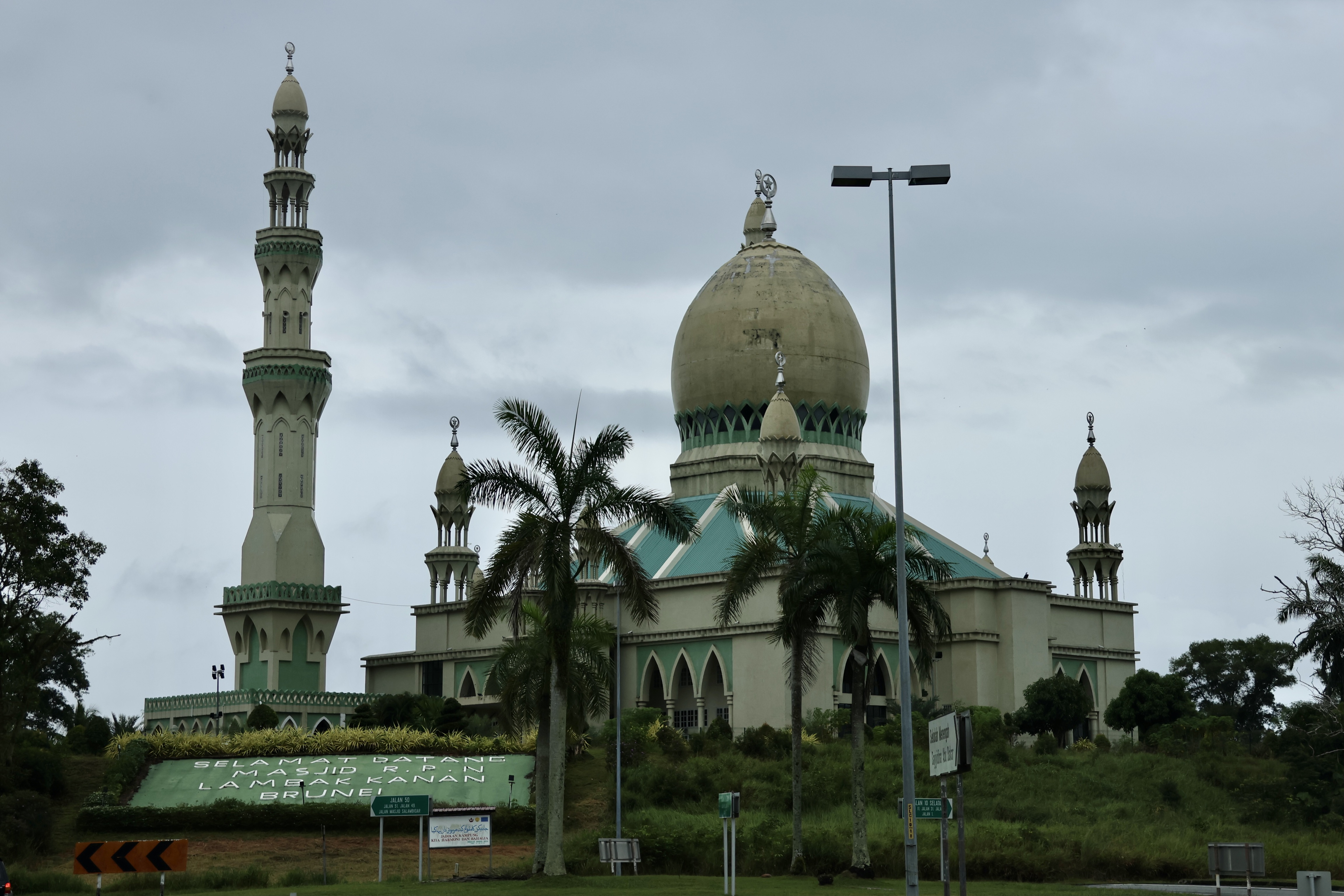
- Perpindahan Lambak Kanan Mosque

- Location in Brunei
- Coordinates: 4°58′20″N 114°57′58″E
- Country: Brunei
- District: Brunei-Muara
- Mukim: Berakas 'B'
- Established: 1986

Government
  - Village head: Ibrahim Duraman (Area 1); Omar Safar (Area 2); Mahir Mohd Yusof (Area 3); Mohamad Fazzly (Area 4); Hamidi Abdul Wahid (Area 5)

Population (2016) (Note: See Administration section.)
  - Total: 19,833
- Time zone: UTC+8 (BNT)

RPN Lambak Kanan, Kampong Perpindahan Lambak Kanan or simply Lambak Kanan is a public housing estate in Brunei-Muara District, Brunei, on the outskirts of the country's capital Bandar Seri Begawan. The total population was 19,833 in 2016. Established in 1986, it is the first estate for the National Housing Scheme (Rancangan Perumahan Negara, RPN), the public housing programme for the country's citizens.

== Geography ==
The estate is located on the northern outskirts of the municipal area of Bandar Seri Begawan, and about 12 kilometres (7.5 mi) from its city centre. Neighbouring villages include Kampong Salambigar to the east, Kampong Sungai Hanching and Kampong Sungai Tilong to the south-east, Kampong Manggis to the south, Kampong Madang to the south-west, Kampong Lambak to the west and Kampong Lambak Kiri to the north-west.

== Administration ==
For subdivision purposes, the estate has been divided into, and established as, five villages:

Village	Population (2016)	Postcode	Mukim
RPN Lambak Kanan Area 1	4,919	BC2315	Berakas 'B'
RPN Lambak Kanan Area 2	5,339	BC2515	Berakas 'B'
RPN Lambak Kanan Area 3	2,878	BC2715	Berakas 'B'
RPN Lambak Kanan Area 4	4,823	BC2915	Berakas 'B'
RPN Lambak Kanan Area 5	1,874	BC3115	Berakas 'B'
Total	19,833	-	-

== Demography ==
This area is inhabited by 4,000 to 5,000 residents consisting of 266 elderly people, 42 orphans. This village has 648 houses. The area of Village Area 3 of Lambak Kanan National Housing is 139.66 hectares with a total of over 350 houses. A total of more than 3,300 residents live in this village, which includes 391 elderly people.

== Infrastructure ==
=== Education ===
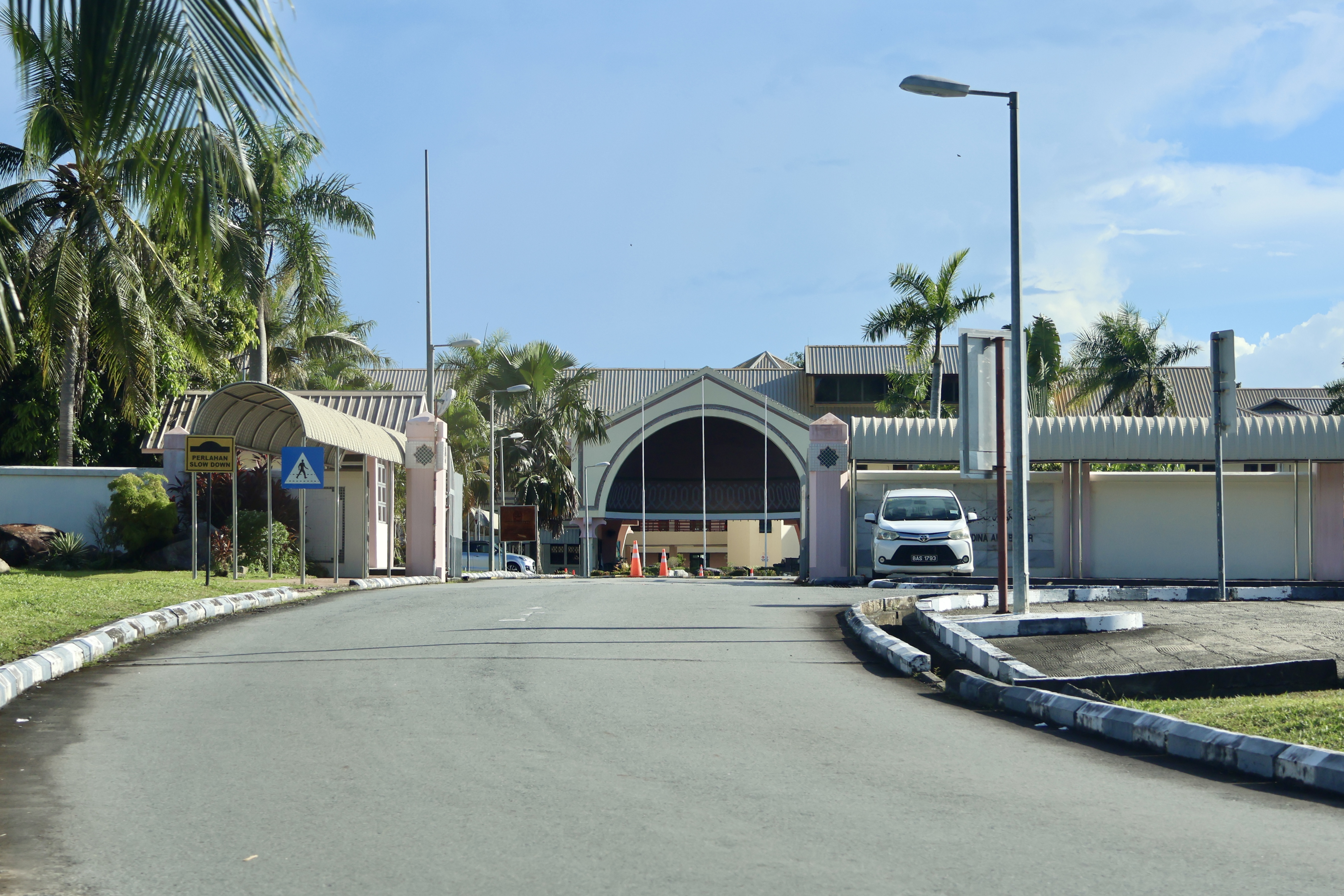
Sayyidina Abu Bakar Secondary School in 2024

Sayyidina Abu Bakar Secondary School is the sole government secondary school for the estate.

The local government primary schools include:

- Dato Basir Primary School
- Dato Marsal Primary School — opened in January 1990, initially known as Sekolah Rendah Kampong Manggis ("Kampong Manggis Primary School"). It was renamed to the current name by the consent of Sultan Hassanal Bolkiah on 23 January 1992 in honour of Marsal Maun, a local figure who had made significant contribution to the country's education system at that time.
- Lambak Kanan Jalan 49 Primary School
- Perpindahan Lambak Kanan Jalan 10 Primary School
- Pengiran Anak Puteri Hajah Masna Secondary School — an all-girls school, initially known as Sekolah Rendah Menengah Kanan ("Lambak Kanan Primary School"). It was renamed to the current name in 1993 in honour of Princess Masna obtaining her Bachelor of Arts from Universiti Brunei Darussalam in 1992.

Dato Basir Primary School and Lambak Kanan Jalan 49 Primary School also house a sekolah ugama ("religious school" i.e. school for the country's Islamic religious primary education). Two other sekolah ugama in the area, namely Lambak Kanan Religious School and Perpindahan Lambak Kanan Jalan 77 Religious School, have dedicated grounds.

=== Housing ===
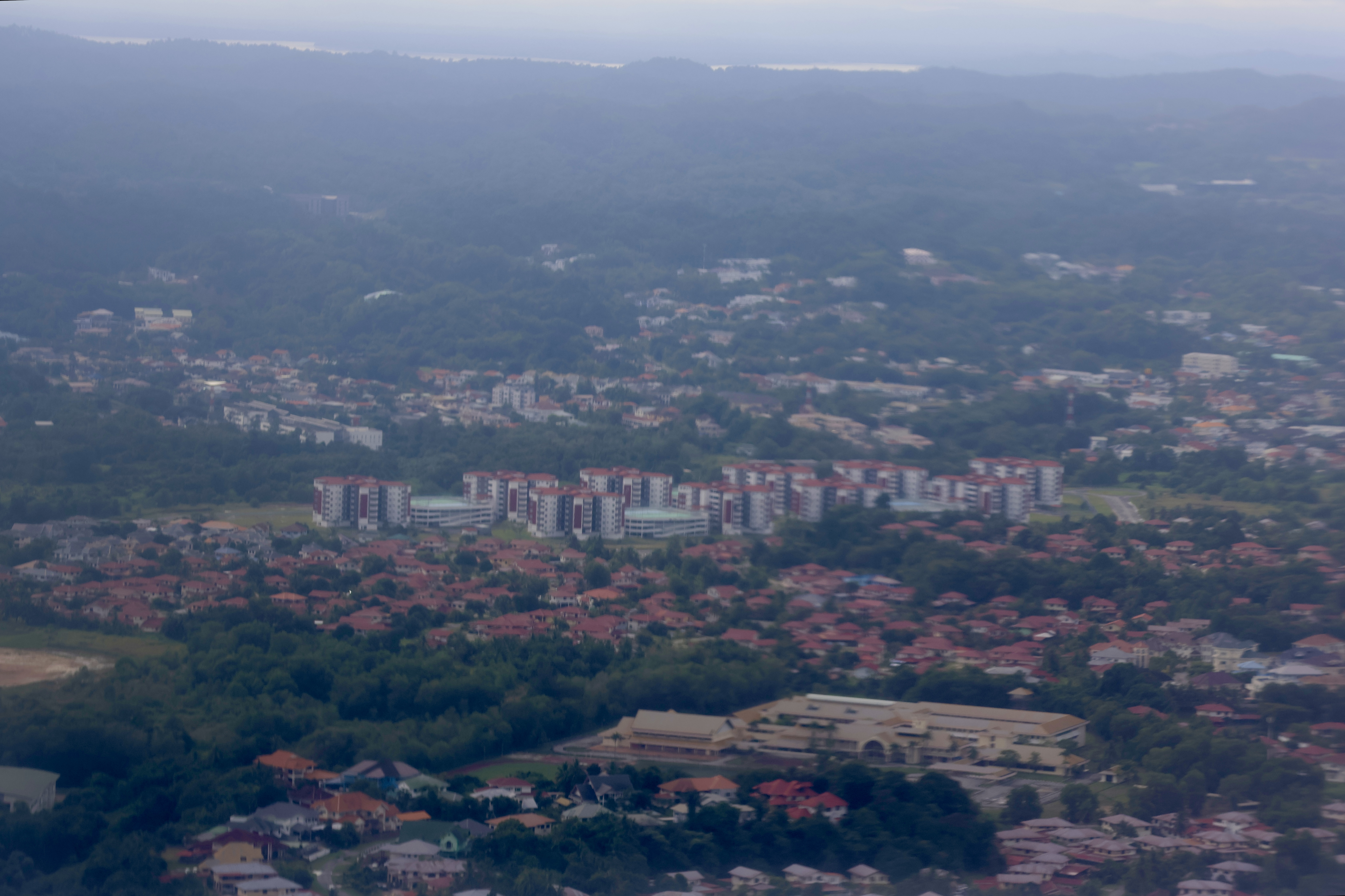
Lambak Kanan vertical government housing scheme in 2023

A 47 hectares (120 acres) site at Lambak Kanan was confirmed as the location for Brunei's first vertical government housing scheme. Tender documents released in 2010 outlined plans for the development of at least 1,500 apartment units, with the residential footprint covering 14 hectares, or 30% of the site. The master plan included multi-purpose open spaces, recreation facilities, schools, community centers, and commercial/retail amenities. The tender also called for the construction and completion of an initial stage, consisting of approximately 420 units on a 4 hectares (9.9 acres) area. Proposed unit sizes ranged from 85 square metres (910 sq ft) (10% of units), 115 square metres (60%), to 130 square metres (30%), with initial design specifications allowing for a maximum height of 12 storeys. However, following further discussions, the Ministry of Development opted for a more conservative approach, settling on a six-storey design, which was formally announced in January 2012. This project marked Brunei’s first serious attempt to introduce vertical housing and to promote this shift in housing policy to the public.

=== Healthcare ===
The estate is home to Berakas Health Centre (Pusat Kesihatan Berakas), the community health centre for the residents of Mukim Berakas 'A' and Mukim Berakas 'B'.

=== Mosque ===
Perpindahan Lambak Kanan Mosque is the local mosque; it was inaugurated on 19 July 1996 by Sultan Hassanal Bolkiah. It can accommodate 2,400 worshippers.

=== Miscellaneous ===
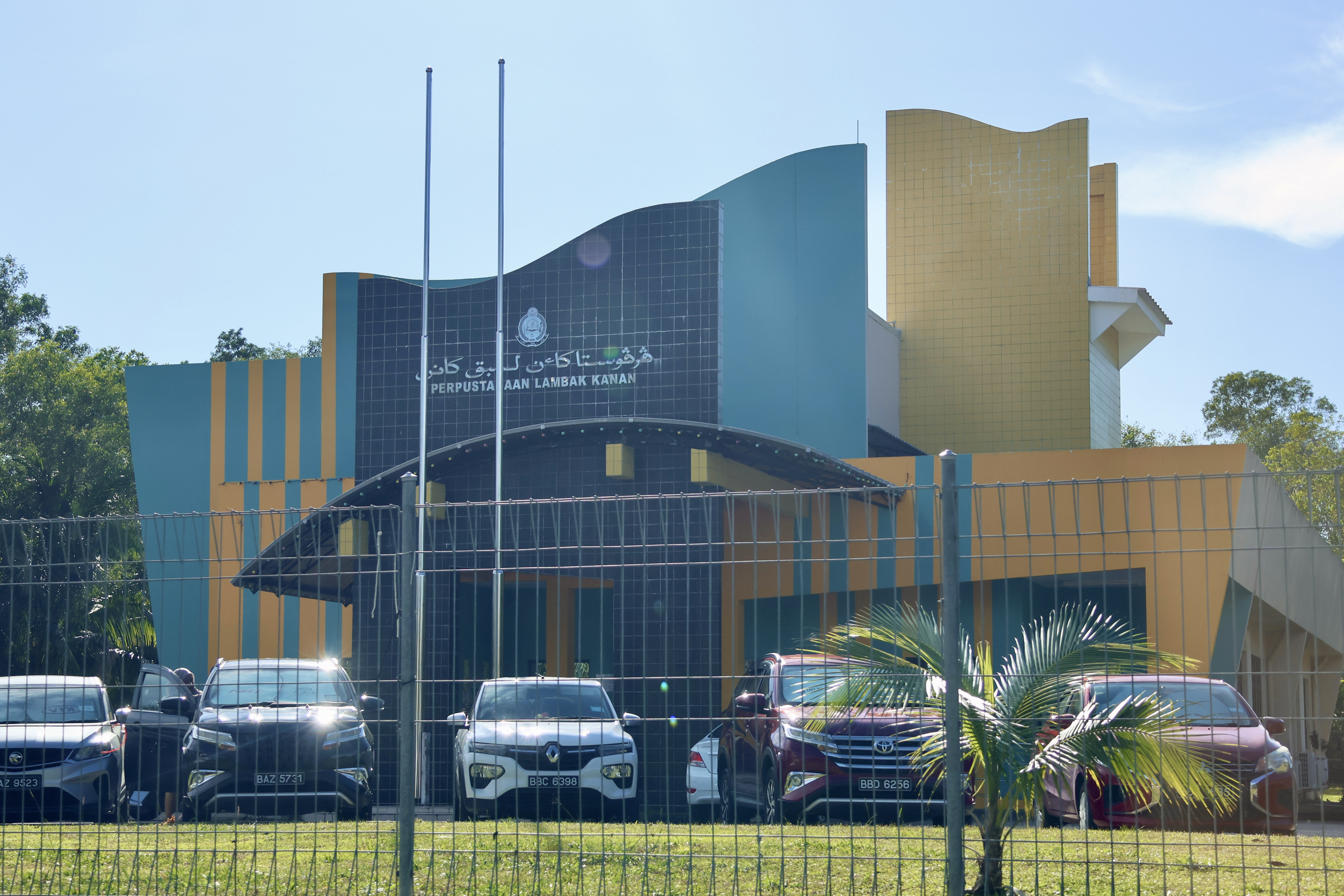
Lambak Kanan Library in 2024

Other local facilities include:

- Lambak Kanan Fire Station — operated by the Brunei Fire and Rescue Department
- Lambak Kanan Library — a branch of the country's public library system administered under Dewan Bahasa dan Pustaka Brunei. It was inaugurated in 2008.
- High Commission of Pakistan

== Notable people ==
- Zain Serudin (born 1936), writer and politician
- Adanan Yusof (born 1952), politician

== See also ==
- Kampong Lambak
- Lambak Kiri
- RPN Kampong Rimba
