= Kampong Sungai Akar =

Village and neighbourhood in Brunei

Sungai Akar
- Village and neighbourhood
- Kampong Akar Camp
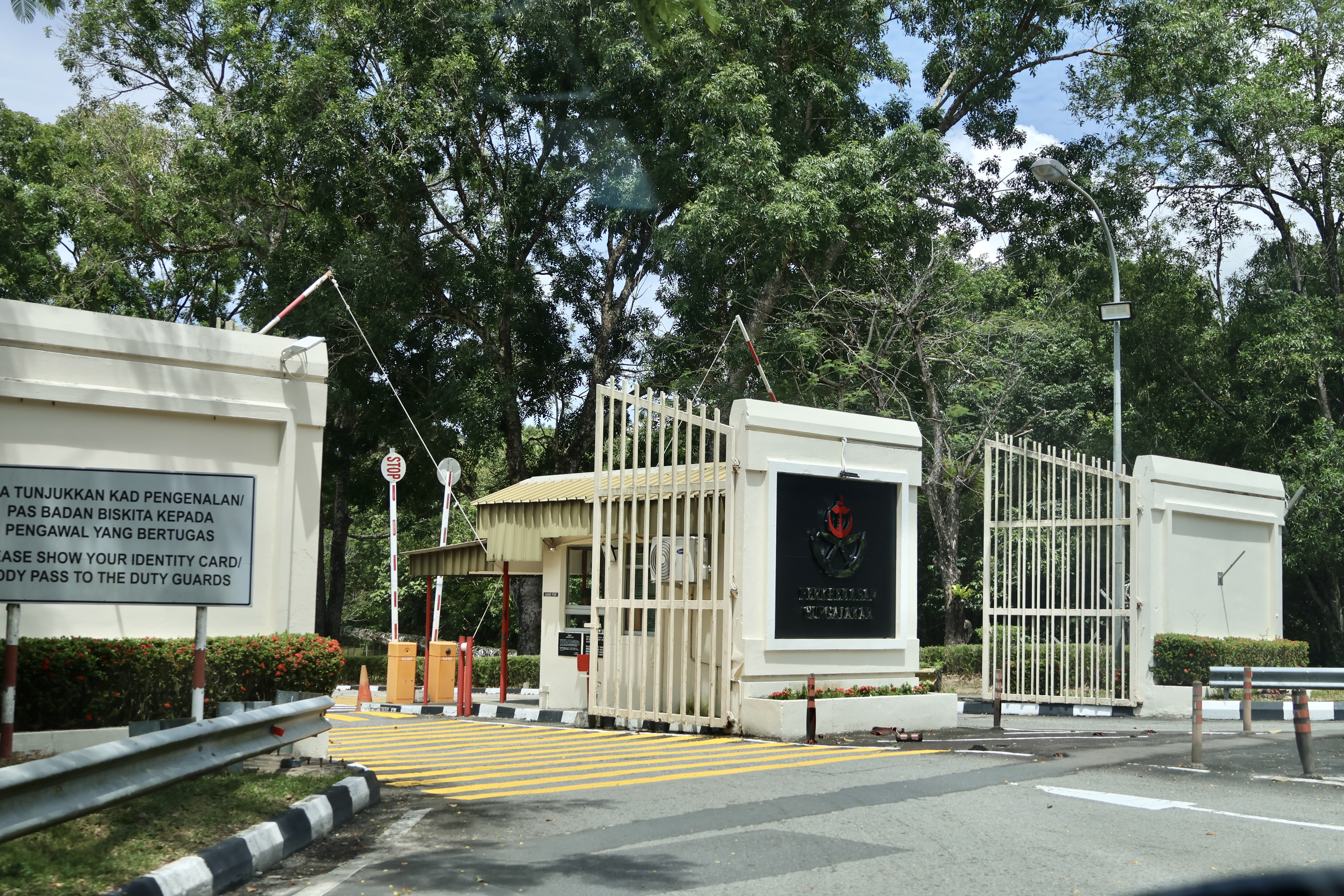
- Sungai Akar Camp

- Location in Brunei
- Coordinates: 4°56′16″N 114°58′00″E
- Country: Brunei
- District: Brunei-Muara
- Mukim: Berakas 'B'

Government
  - Village head: Zailani Abdul Malik

Population (2016)
  - Total: 5,467
- Time zone: UTC+8 (BNT)
- Postcode: BC4115

Kampong Sungai Akar (Note: From the Malay name, 'Sungai Akar Village') (Malay: Kampung Sungai Akar) or commonly known as Sungai Akar, is a village in Brunei-Muara District, Brunei, as well as a neighbourhood in the capital Bandar Seri Begawan. The population was 5,467 in 2016.

== Etymology ==
According to folk tale, there used to be many snakes, especially in the rivers, whether small snakes or big snakes like the swallow snake. The elders understood the snake as a 'akar', so the name Kampung Sungai Akar arose because if given the name of Kampung Sungai Ular, it would certainly not sound good.

== Administration ==
Kampong Sungai Akar is one of the villages under Mukim Berakas 'B', a mukim in Brunei-Muara District. It has the postcode BC4115. The village has also been subsumed under the municipal area of the capital Bandar Seri Begawan.

== Demography ==
According to the population census conducted by the Department of Statistics, Department of Planning and Economic Development in 2011, the total population in Kampong Sungai Akar is 6,336 people, namely 3,788 males and 2,458 females.

== Infrastructure ==
Several government offices are located in the village, including the Radio Television Brunei Department (RTB) and the Land Transport Department. In addition, there are also secondary and primary schools, namely Freda Radin School, Stella School, PGGMB School, Arab Secondary School and Miftah An-Nur Islamic International School.

The village mosque is Rashidah Sa'adatul Bolkiah Mosque and it was inaugurated by Sultan Hassanal Bolkiah on 19 July 2013. The mosque was built at a cost of around B$3.2 million (US$2.4 million as of October 2021). It can accommodate 1,000 worshippers.

The Sungai Akar Camp hosts the Gurkha Reserve Unit (GRU). Additionally, the Officer Cadet School (OCS) of the Royal Brunei Armed Forces (RBAF) is also located within the base.

The village is also home to the Bangladesh and India High Commissions.

== Achievements ==
On 19 February 2010, Kampong Sungai Akar was announced as the champion and became an exemplary village in the Cleanliness and Beauty Contest for villages under Mukim Berakas 'B'.

In addition, this village has also successfully collected donations amounting to BND1,459 for the collection of donations for the Indonesian earthquake and the Philippine storm which collection was held for a month starting from 19 November 2009 until 19 December 2009.

The Muslim women of this village mosque have also succeeded in winning the Murattal Al-Quran team competition for the Muslim women of Brunei and Muara district mosques on 9 February 2015.

== Notable people ==
- Abdul Momin Othman (1923–2006), diplomat and politician
