= Kampong Lambak =

Village in Brunei

Kampong Lambak Kampung Lambak کامڤوڠ لمبق
- Village
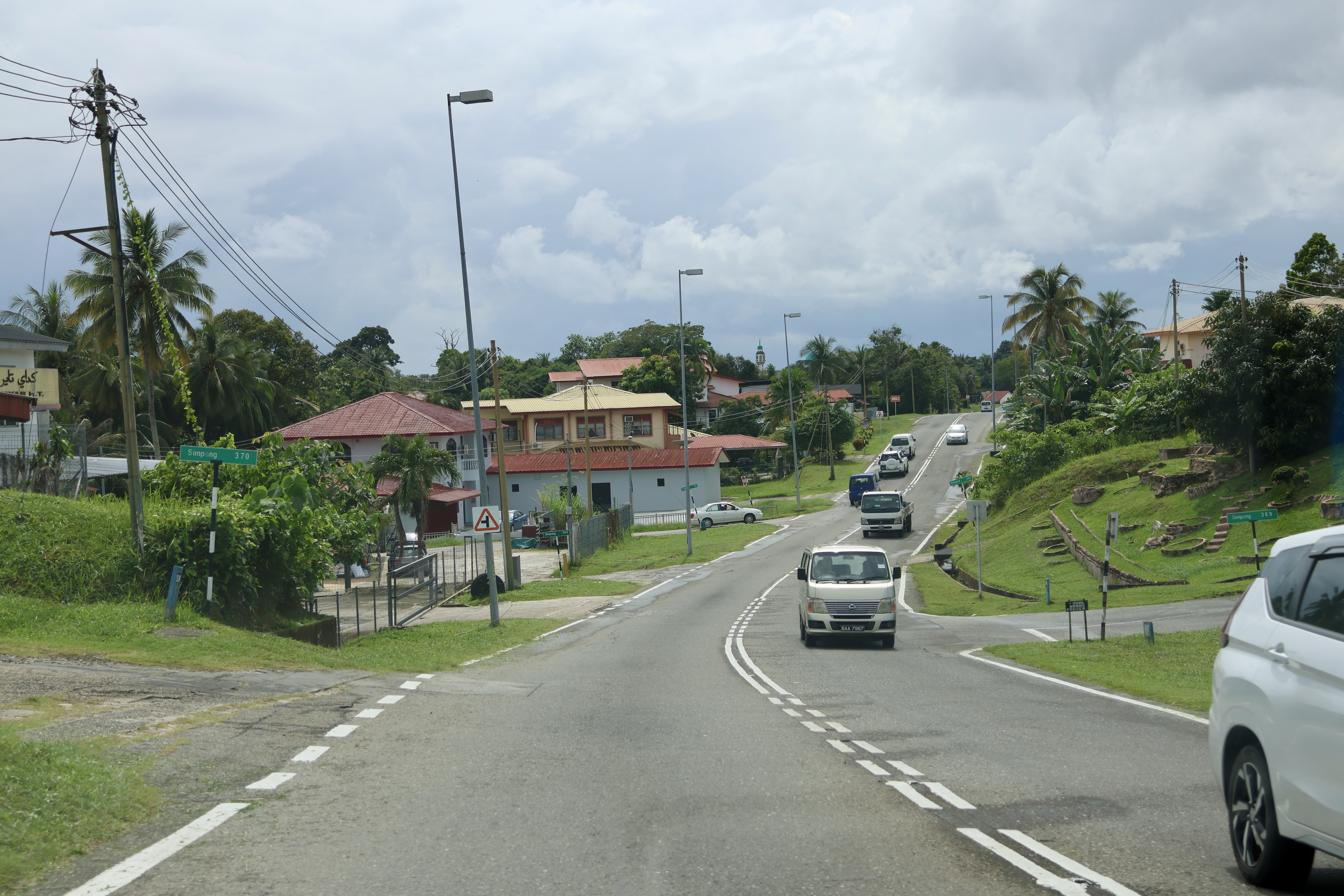
- Jalan Pasir Berakas

- Location in Brunei
- Coordinates: 4°58′08″N 114°56′46″E
- Country: Brunei
- District: Brunei-Muara
- Mukim: Berakas 'A'

Population (2016) (Note: See Administration section)
  - Total: 7,293
- Time zone: UTC+8 (BNT)

Kampong Lambak is a village in Brunei-Muara District, Brunei, on the outskirts of the country's capital Bandar Seri Begawan. It has a total population of 7,293 in 2016.

== Administration ==
For administrative purposes Kampong Lambak has been divided into, and established as, two village subdivisions:

Village	Population (2016)	Postcode
Kampong Lambak 'A'	3,914	BB1314
Kampong Lambak 'B'	3,379	BB1714
Total	7,293	-

Both are village subdivisions within Mukim Berakas 'A'.

== Demography ==
Kampung Lambak 'B' has experienced a rapid growth in the housing sector which is increasing by recording a total of 715 houses within a distance of approximately 12km from the capital.

== Infrastructure ==
Among the basic facilities in the village include a government-owned school and a private school, business complexes, gas stations, vehicle workshops, industrial complexes and an Islamic cemetery.

Datu Mahawangsa Primary School is the village's government primary school. It also shares grounds with Datu Mahawangsa Religious School, the village's government school for the country's Islamic religious primary education.

Kampong Lambak Mosque is the village mosque; it was inaugurated on 11 June 1994 by Prince Sufri Bolkiah, a brother of Sultan Hassanal Bolkiah. The mosque can accommodate 1,400 worshippers.

== Notable people ==
- Abidin Abdul Rashid (1939–2010), politician and nobleman
- Zakaria Sulaiman (1937–2011), politician and nobleman

== See also ==
- Lambak Kanan
- Kampong Lambak Kiri
