= Kampong Lambak Kiri =

Village in Brunei

- Village
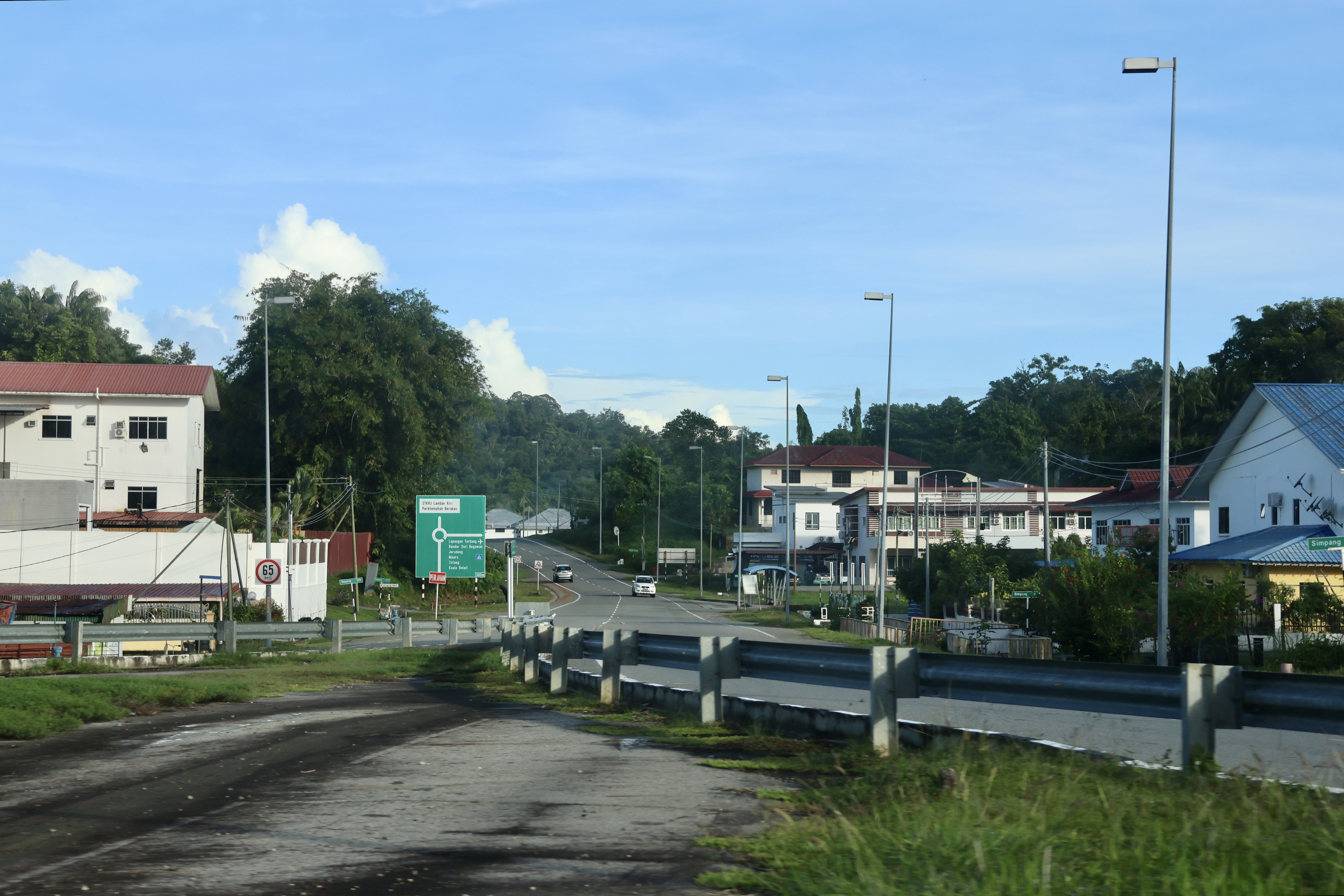
- Jalan Pasir Berakas

- Location in Brunei
- Coordinates: 4°59′21″N 114°57′00″E
- Country: Brunei
- District: Brunei-Muara
- Mukim: Berakas 'A'

Population (2016)
  - Total: 2,791
- Time zone: UTC+8 (BNT)
- Postcode: BB1214

Kampong Lambak Kiri is a village in the north of Brunei-Muara District, Brunei. The population was 2,791 in 2016. It is one of the villages within Mukim Berakas 'A'. The postcode is BB1214.

== Notable people ==
- Abdullah Bakar (born 1951), politician

== See also ==
- Kampong Lambak
- Kampong Perpindahan Lambak Kanan
