= Mukim Berakas 'B' =

Mukim in Brunei

- Mukim
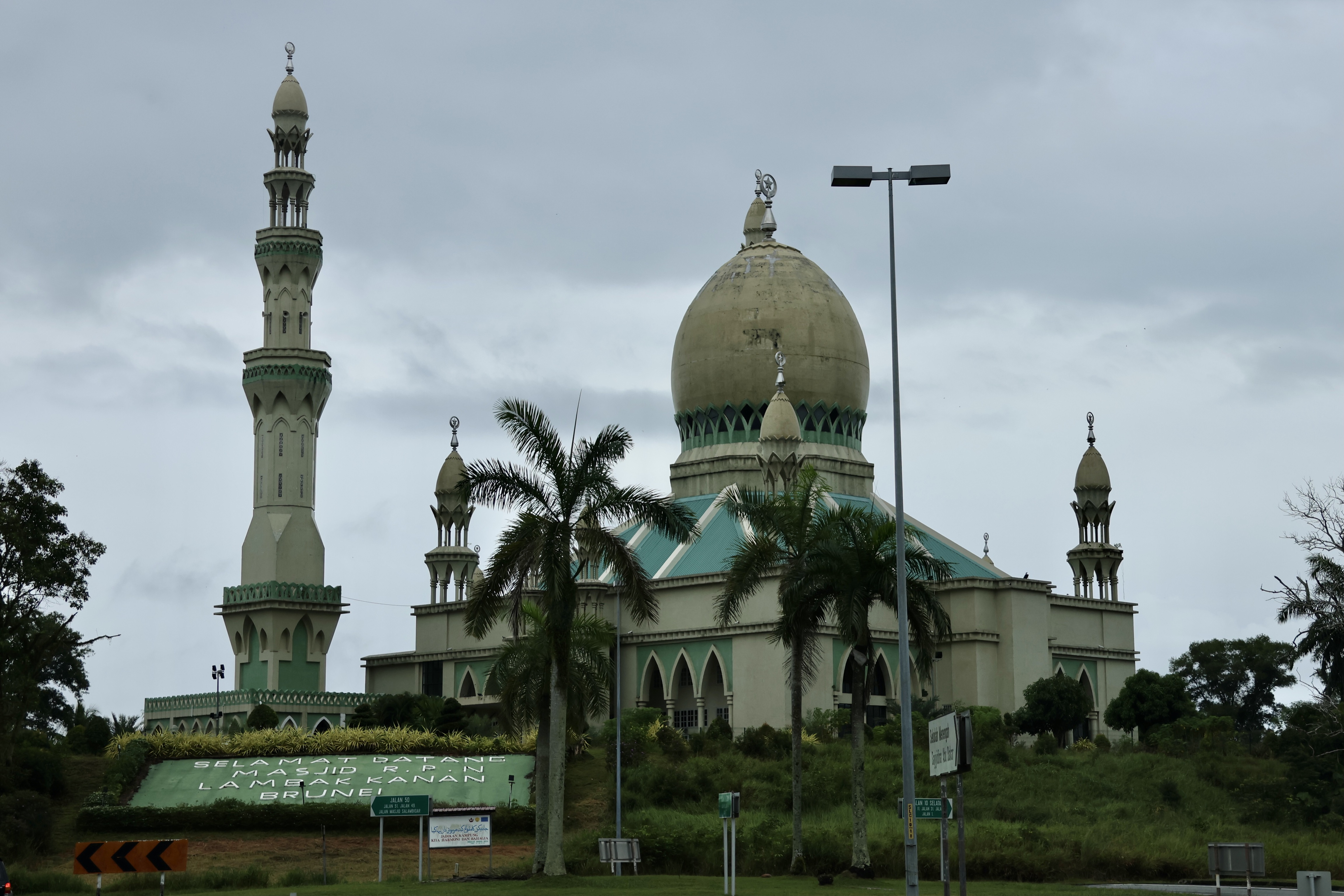
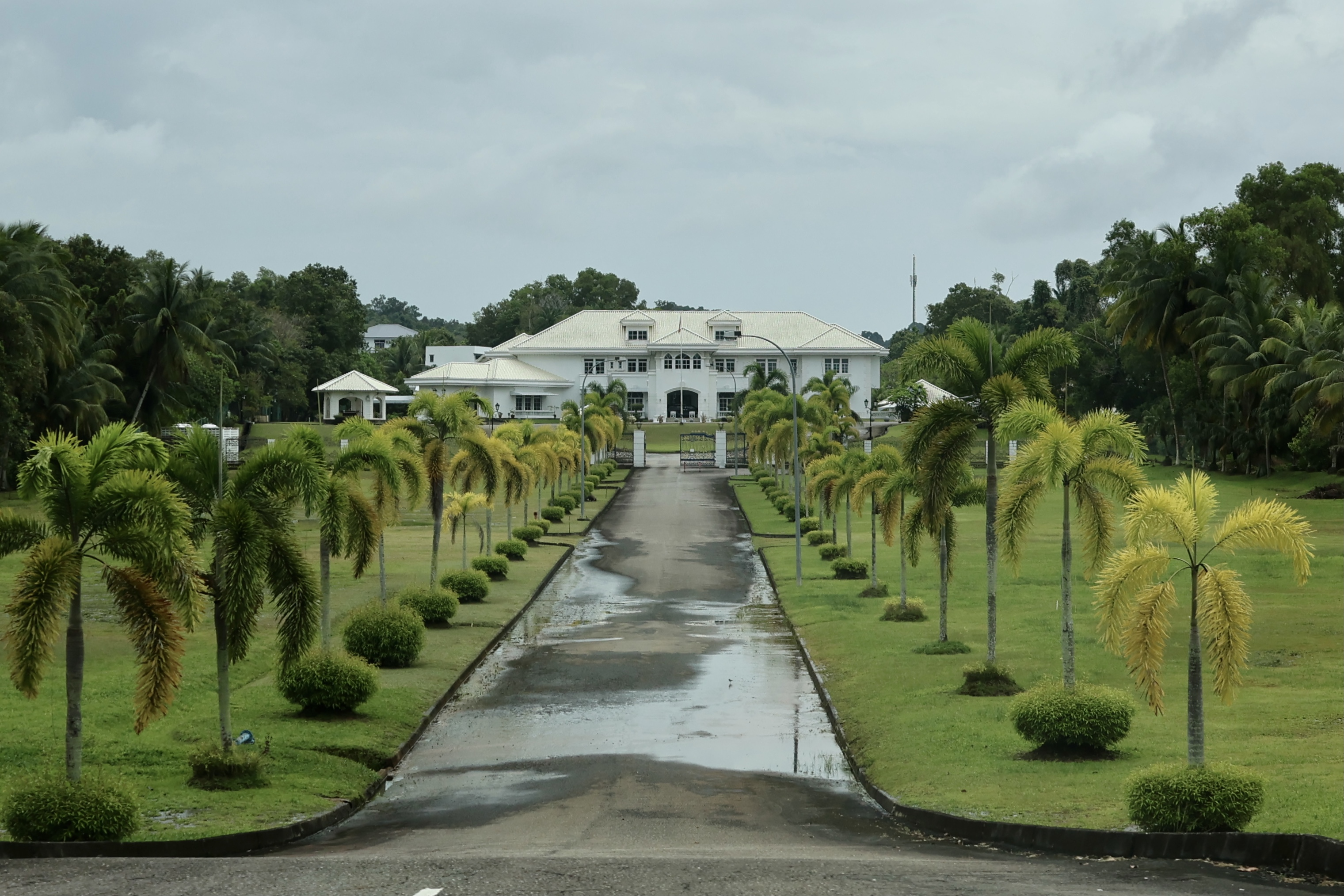
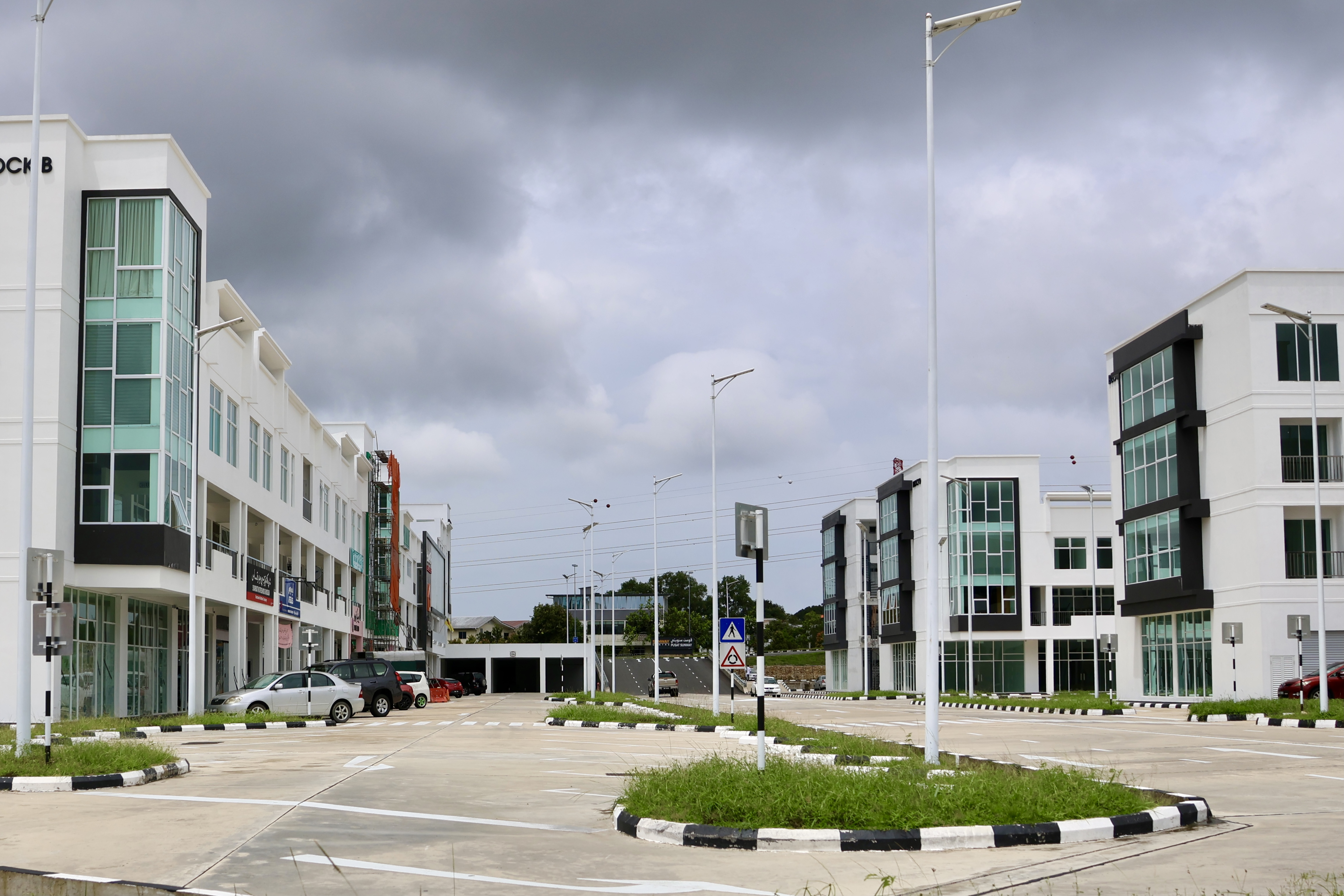
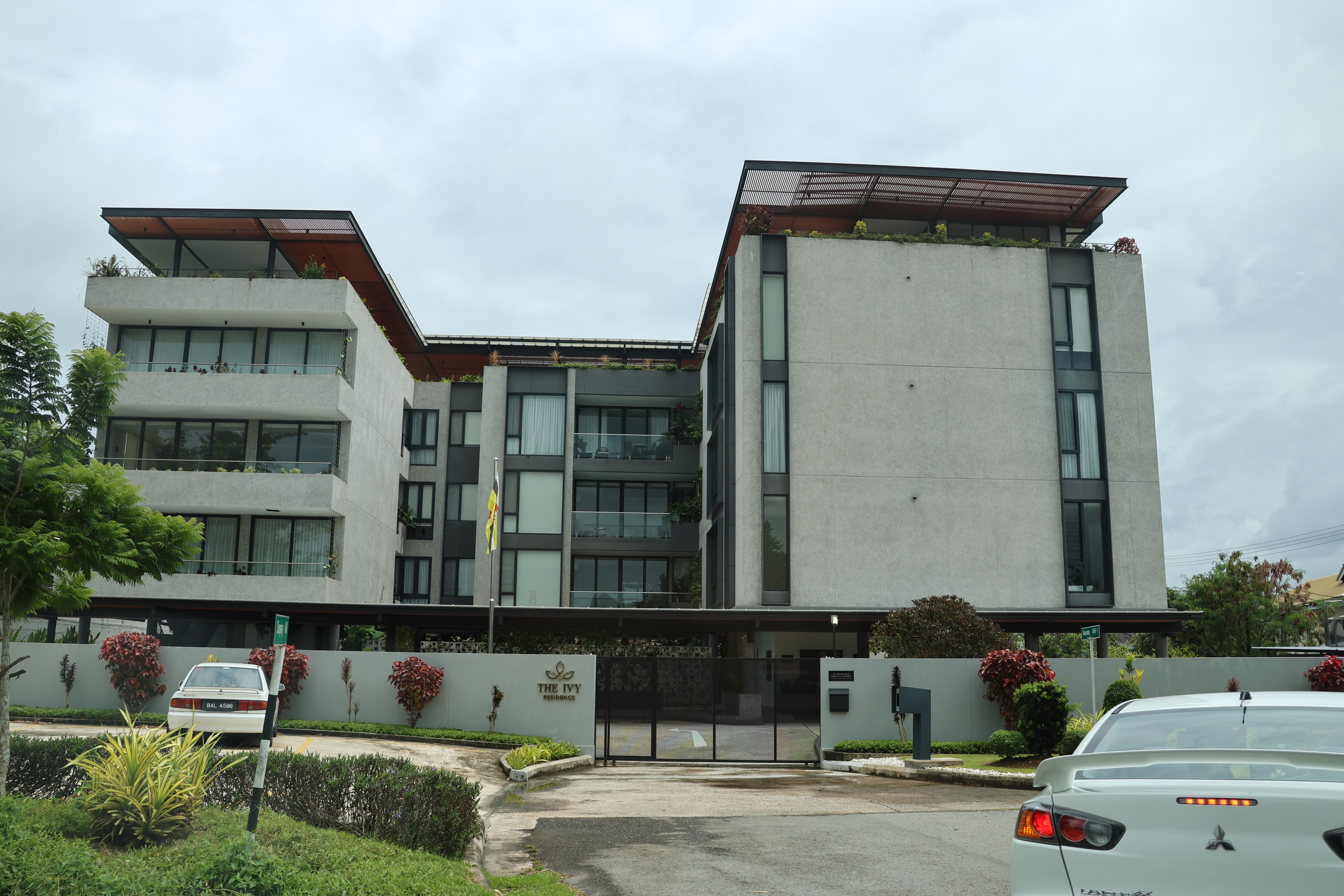
- Clockwise from top left: Lambak Kanan, Sungai Orok, Manggis, Sungai Akar

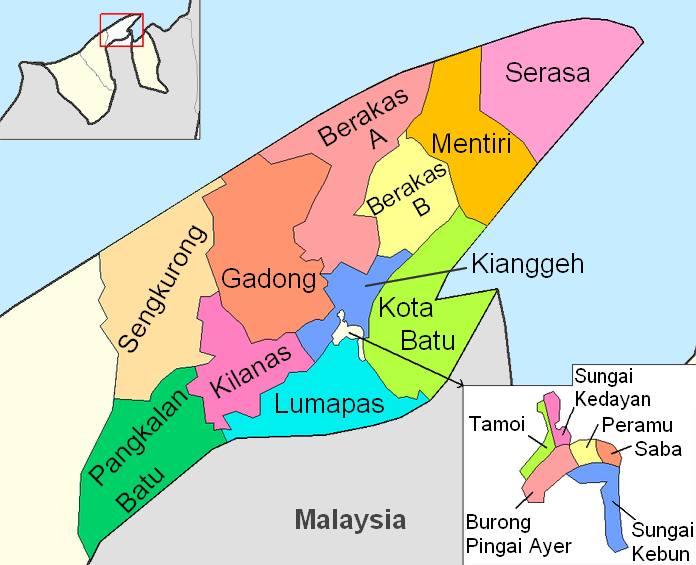
- Berakas 'B' is in yellow.
- Coordinates: 4°59′00″N 114°55′00″E
- Country: Brunei
- District: Brunei-Muara
- Established: 1996

Government
  - Penghulu: Omar Safar

Population (2021)
  - Total: 39,284
- Time zone: UTC+8 (BNT)
- Postcode: BCxx15

Mukim Berakas 'B' is a mukim in Brunei-Muara District, Brunei.

== Etymology ==
People from the Kampong Ayer used to travel to the Berakas to get firewood before resettlement. Only a jungle at that time, they wrapped the woods when they had gathered them. In Brunei Malay, the act of bundling the woods is known as berkas. As word spread about memberakas kayu (to gather firewood), Berakas was established as the location where people go.

== History ==
In the late 1940s, Mukim Berakas was primarily made up of forest land. It took some time before additional people moved in; first, just the Kedayans resided here. In the 1950s, when they initially started settling in this region, lands in the Anggerek Desa and Burong Pingai were allotted under the first Kampong Ayer resettlement scheme.

== Background ==
The mukim and Mukim Berakas 'A' were originally one mukim by the name 'Mukim Berakas' before being split into the current divisions in 1996.

== Geography ==
The mukim is located in the north-east centre of Brunei-Muara District, bordering Mukim Mentiri to the north-east, Mukim Kota Batu to the south-east, Mukim Kianggeh to the south and Mukim Berakas 'A' to the west and north.

== Demographics ==
As of 2016 census, the population was 40,710 with 50.7% males and 49.3% females. The mukim had 6,461 households occupying 6,397 dwellings. The entire population lived in urban areas.

== Administration ==
As of 2021, the mukim encompasses the following populated villages:

Settlements	Population (2021)	Ketua kampung (2024)
Kampong Madang	1,916	Mohamad Norfarzulillah bin Gapar
Kampong Manggis	3,681	Omar bin Haji Mohd Alli
Kampong Sungai Akar	6,129	Haji Zailani bin Haji Abdul Malik (Acting)
Kampong Sungai Tilong	4,204	Pengiran Haji Ruzaini bin Pengiran Haji Shahbudin
Kampong Sungai Hanching	3,189	Haji Abd Rahman bin Safar
Kampong Salambigar	1,886	Haji Abd Rahman bin Safar (Acting)
RPN Lambak Kanan Area 1	4,223	Haji Ibrahim @ Haji Brahim bin Haji Duraman
RPN Lambak Kanan Area 2	4,771	Haji Omar bin Haji Safar
RPN Lambak Kanan Area 3	2,338	Haji Mahir bin Mohd Yusof
RPN Lambak Kanan Area 4	4,157	Haji Mohamad Fazzly bin Haji Suhaili
RPN Lambak Kanan Area 5	1,719	Haji Hamidi bin Haji Abdul Wahid
Kampong Sungai Orok	1,071	—N/a

== Infrastructures ==
=== Public housing ===
There is a public housing area within the mukim, namely Rancangan Perumahan Negara Lambak Kanan ('Lambak Kanan National Housing Scheme') located in Kampong Lambak Kanan.

== See also ==
- Mukim Berakas 'A'
