= Kampong Madang =

Village in Brunei

- Village and neighbourhood
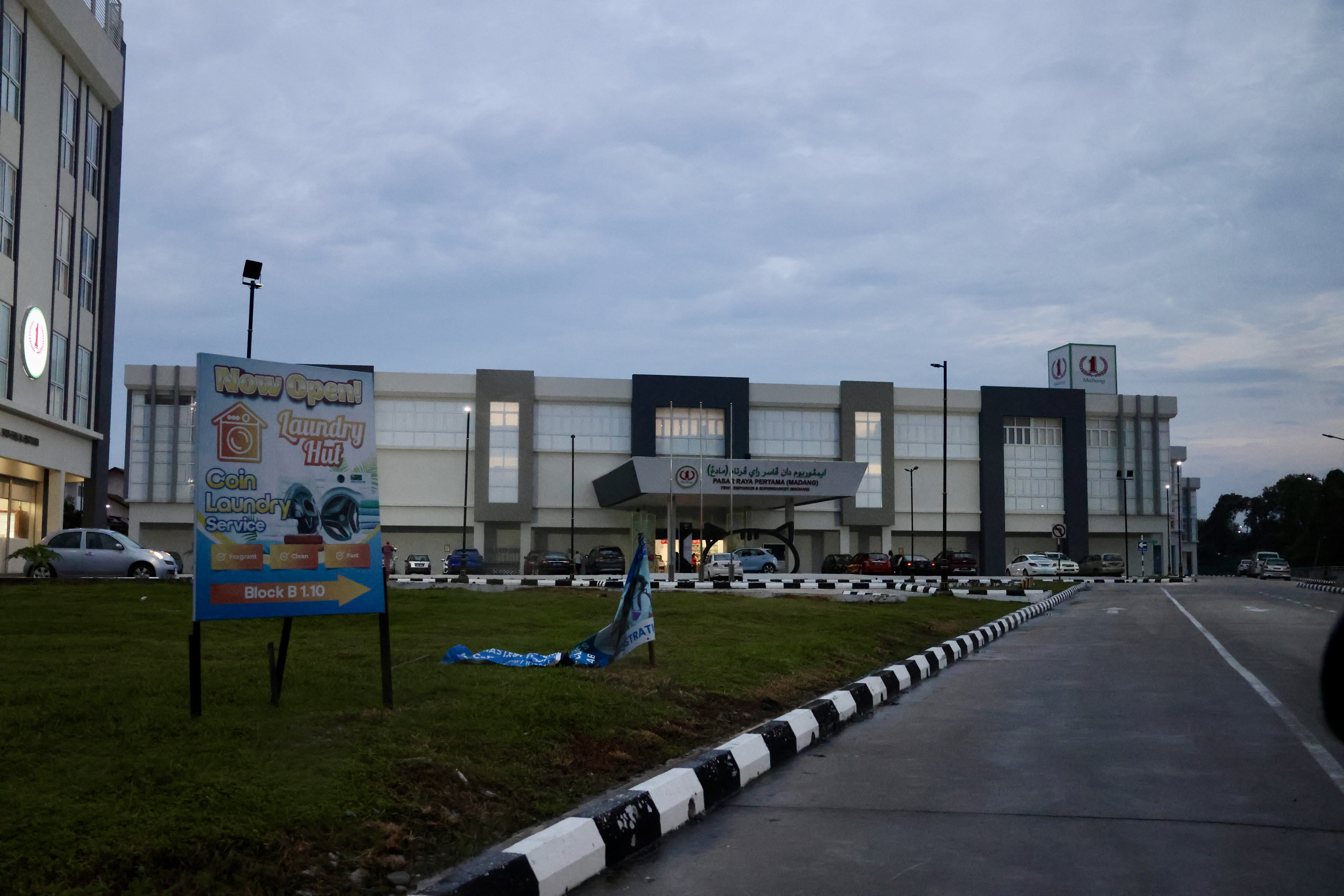
- Commercial buildings

- Location in Brunei
- Coordinates: 4°57′17″N 114°57′08″E
- Country: Brunei
- District: Brunei-Muara
- Mukim: Berakas 'B'

Government
  - Village head: Mohamad Norfarzulillah

Population (2016)
  - Total: 1,231
- Time zone: UTC+8 (BNT)
- Postcode: BC3715

Kampong Madang is a village in Brunei-Muara District, Brunei, as well as a neighbourhood in the capital Bandar Seri Begawan. The population was 1,231 in 2016. It is one of the villages within Mukim Berakas 'B'. The postcode is BC3715.

== Etymology ==
The village is named after Madang, an obscure and unusual tree.

== Geography ==
The village is located in the central part of Brunei-Muara District. The built-up area is contiguous with the Lambak Kanan public housing to its north and Kampong Manggis to the east. Madang is also one of the neighbourhoods in Bandar Seri Begawan, the capital of Brunei — together with Manggis, they are the northernmost neighbourhoods in the capital.

== Administration ==
Apart from being a village subdivision, Kampong Madang has also been subsumed under the municipal area of the capital Bandar Seri Begawan.

== Facilities ==
Madang Religious School is the village school for the country's Islamic religious primary education.

Suri Seri Begawan Raja Pengiran Anak Damit Mosque is the village mosque for Kampong Madang and the neighbouring Kampong Manggis. It was inaugurated by Sultan Hassanal Bolkiah in 2014. The mosque can accommodate 2,400 worshippers.

== Notable people ==
Pengiran Muda Hashim (1907–1998), Wazir of Brunei
