= Kampong Sungai Tilong =

Kampong Sungai Tilong Kampung Sungai Tilong
- Village
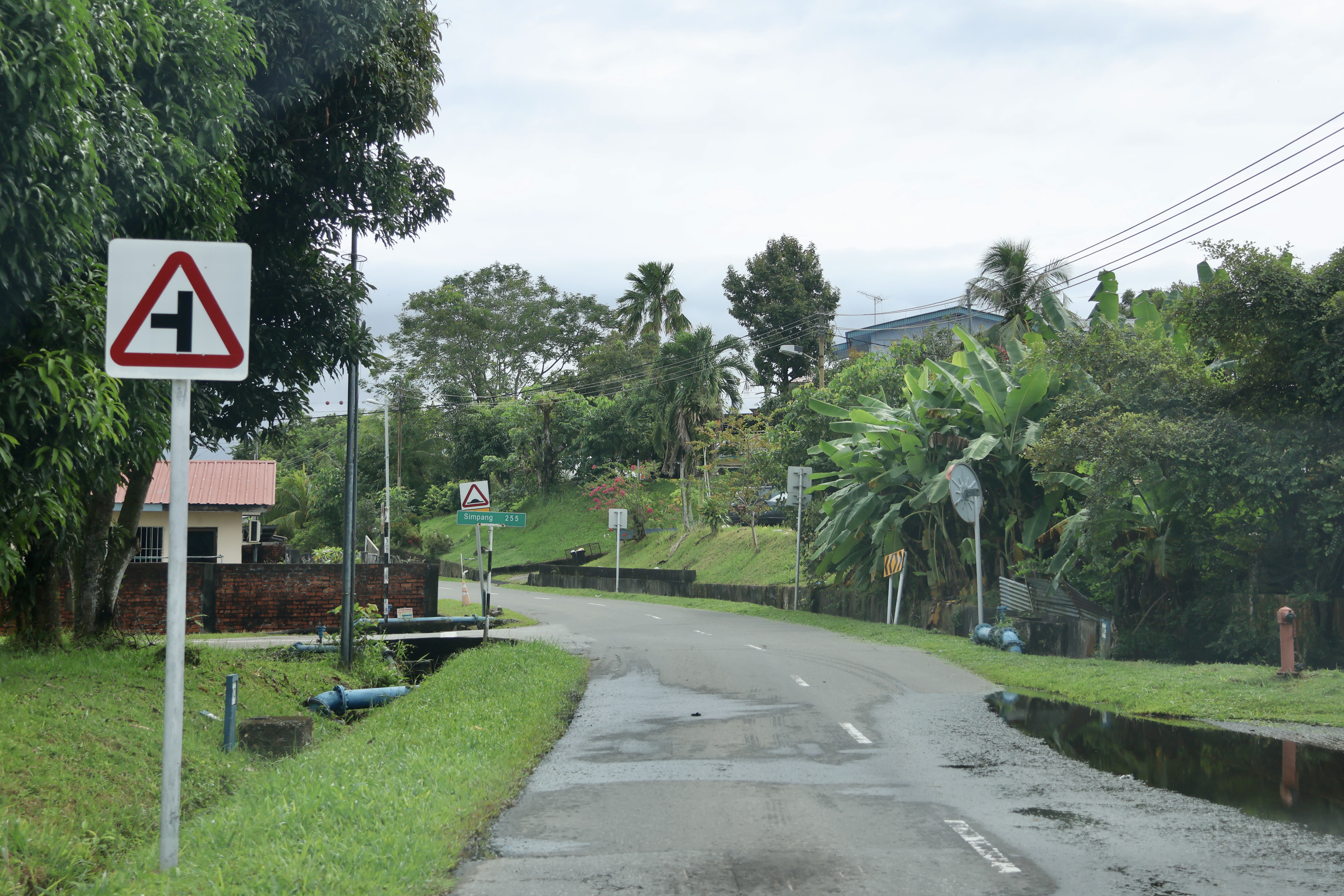
- Jalan Sungai Tilong

- Location in Brunei
- Coordinates: 4°57′24″N 114°58′25″E
- Country: Brunei
- District: Brunei-Muara
- Mukim: Berakas 'B'

Government
  - Village head: Pengiran Ruzaini

Population (2016)
  - Total: 4,054
- Time zone: UTC+8 (BNT)
- Postcode: BC3315

Kampong Sungai Tilong (Malay: Kampung Sungai Tilong) or commonly known as Sungai Tilong, is a village in Brunei-Muara District, Brunei. The population was 4,054 in 2016. It is one of the villages within Mukim Berakas 'B'. The postcode is BC3315.

== Economy ==
Most of the total population works in the public sector, while the rest run their own businesses or serve the private sector. In terms of private enterprise aspects, Kampong Sungai Tilong is also active in part-time business such as accepting orders for traditional cakes such as kalupis, cakes, holiday biscuits and making serunding.

== Infrastructure ==
As in other villages in the country, Kampong Sungai Tilong received the facilities provided by the government such as electricity, water, telephone and community hall. The village has seen rapid development in the establishment of shopping malls, clinics and private schools.

The village also hosts the Jalan Aman Camp of the Singapore Armed Forces (SAF). Families of servicemen are located within this base. Additionally, it is home to a detachment of Republic of Singapore Air Force (RSAF) airmen to transport soldiers to Lakiun Camp or deep into jungles of Temburong District.

The village is also home to the Consulate of Turkey.

== Notable people ==
- Abu Bakar Umar (1906–1985), Speaker of the Legislative Council
- Jaya Rajid (1925–2009), Commissioner of Police
- Suyoi Osman (born 1952), civil servant and politician
- Haini Hashim, artist and diplomat

== See also ==
- Kampong Sungai Hanching
