= Kampong Salambigar =

Village in Brunei

Kampong Salambigar Kampung Salambigar
- Village
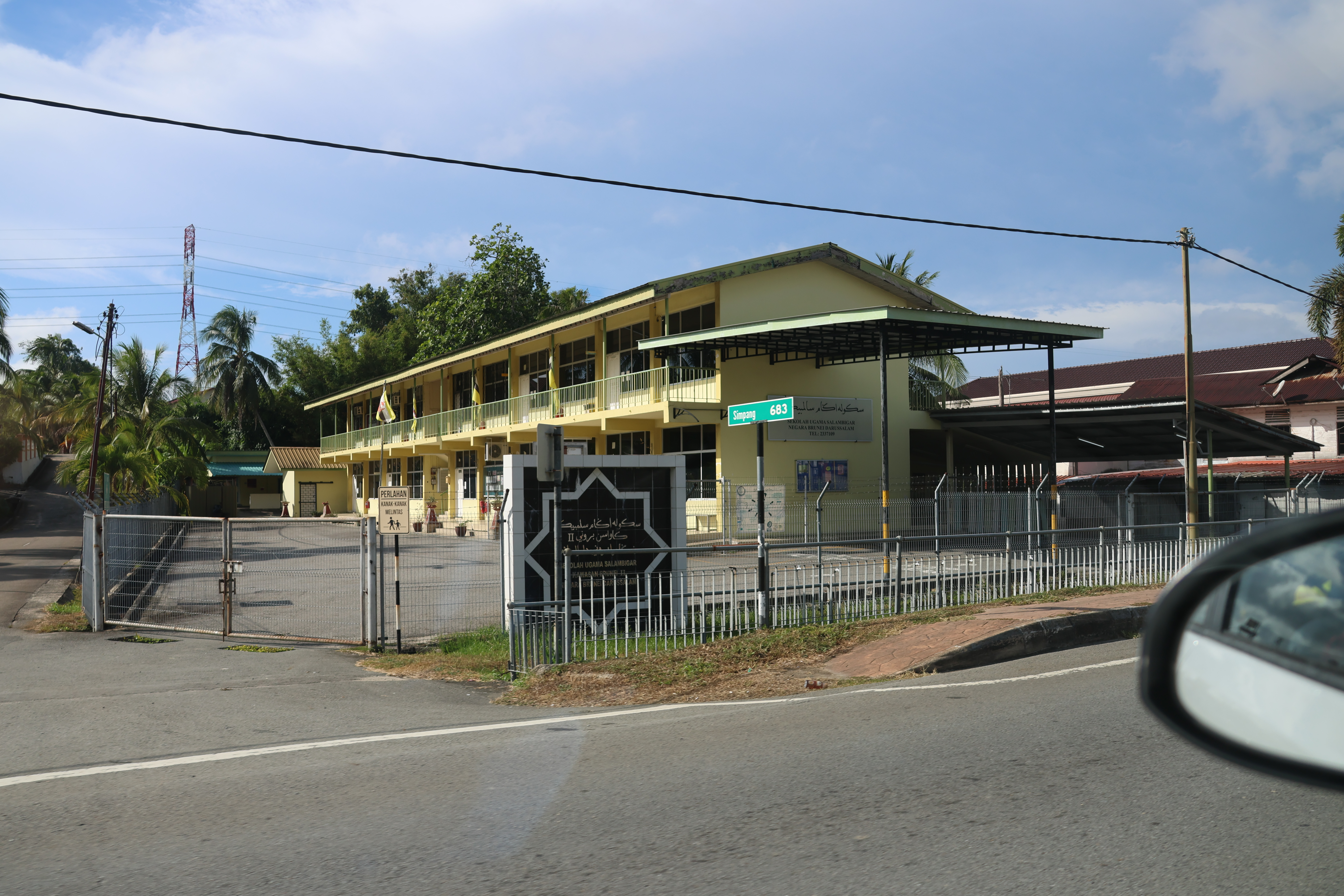
- Salambigar Religious School

- Location in Brunei
- Coordinates: 4°58′54″N 114°59′23″E
- Country: Brunei
- District: Brunei-Muara
- Mukim: Berakas 'B'

Government
  - Village head: Abd Rahman Safar

Population (2016)
  - Total: 1,884
- Time zone: UTC+8 (BNT)
- Postcode: BC1515

Kampong Salambigar is a village in Brunei-Muara District, Brunei. The population was 1,884 in 2016. It is one of the villages within Mukim Berakas 'B'. The postcode is BC1515.

== Economy ==
The Lambak Kanan East Industrial Park, located approximately 20 kilometres (12 mi) from Bandar Seri Begawan in Kampong Salambigar, underwent an expansion to support Brunei's efforts in economic diversification. Initially developed by Brunei Industrial Development Authority for light manufacturing on smaller plots intended for local consumption, the industrial estate covered over 30 hectares (74 acres) in Phase 1, with an additional 40 hectares in Phase 2. The Brunei Economic Development Board (BEDB) oversaw a significant expansion, adding 67 hectares to the western side of the park to accommodate larger-scale industries, particularly in the halal food and beverage, pharmaceuticals, and light manufacturing sectors. This expansion aimed to enhance Brunei's position in the global halal market. Viva Pharmaceuticals finalised the construction of a 9,200 square metres (99,000 sq ft) plant for the production of halal pharmaceuticals, focusing on generic drugs, nutraceuticals, and cosmetics, with plans for further expansion as infrastructure supported it. The BEDB also anticipated investments in oil country tubular goods and light assembly, which were expected to contribute to the development of local enterprises.

== Infrastructure ==
Salambigar Religious School is the village's government school for the country's Islamic religious primary education.

The village mosque is Kampong Salambigar Mosque; it was built in 1995 and can accommodate 1,000 worshippers.

The village is also home to the Embassy of Timor Leste and Consulate of Burkina Faso.

== Notable people ==
- Pengiran Umar (1940–2023), police commissioner and nobleman
- Hazair Abdullah (born 1953), civil servant and politician

== See also ==
- Kampong Sungai Orok
