= Kampong Sungai Orok =

Village in Brunei

Sungai Orok Kampung Sungai Orok
- Village
- Kampong Sungai Orok
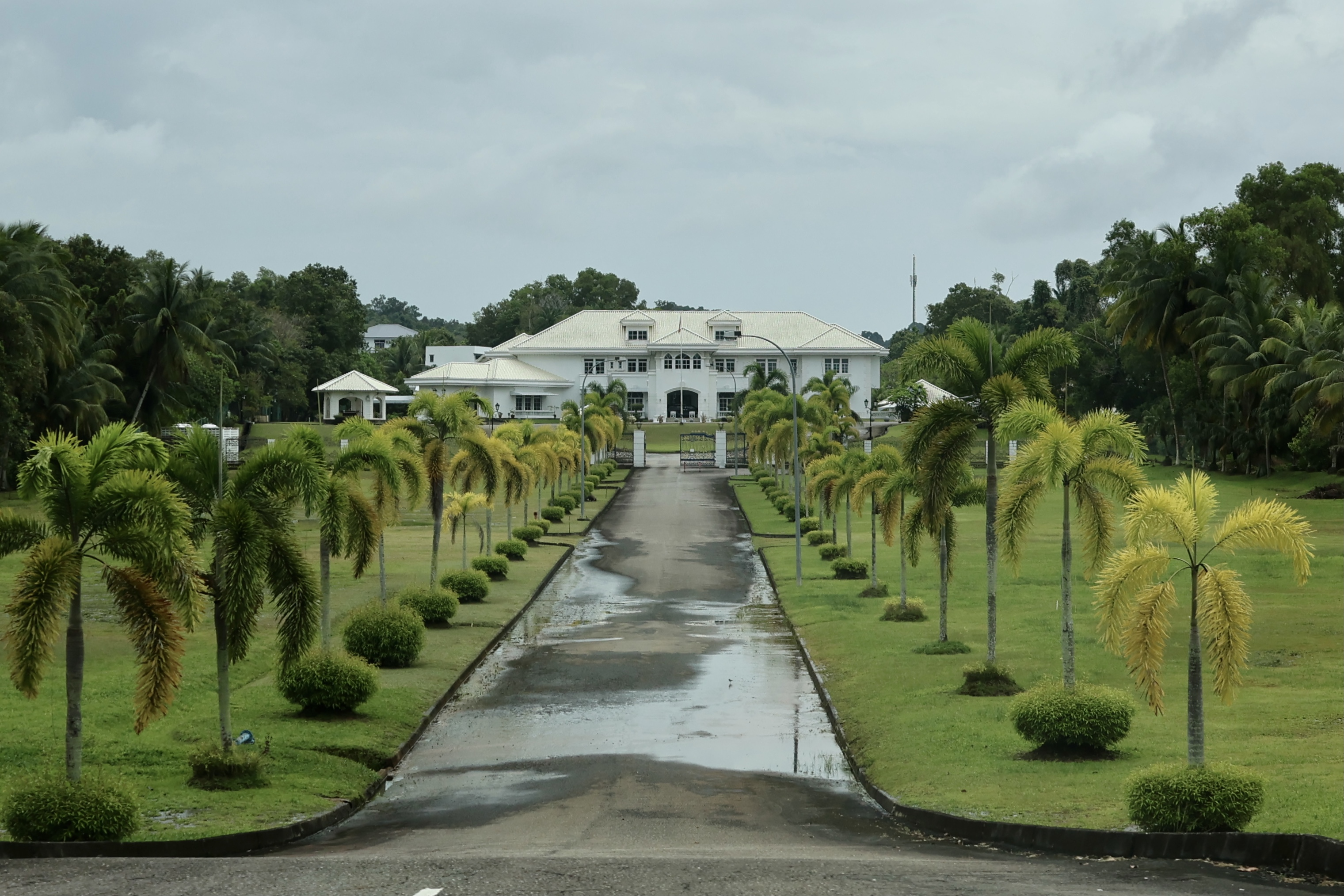

- Location in Brunei
- Coordinates: 4°58′30″N 114°59′02″E
- Country: Brunei
- District: Brunei-Muara
- Mukim: Berakas 'B'

Population (2016)
  - Total: 1,025
- Time zone: UTC+8 (BNT)
- Postcode: BC1715

Kampong Sungai Orok is a village in Brunei-Muara District, Brunei. The population was 1,025 in 2016. It is of the villages within Mukim Berakas 'B'. The postcode is BC1715.
