= Kampong Sungai Hanching =

Kampong Sungai Hanching Kampung Sungai Hanching
- Village
- Kampong Sungai Hanching
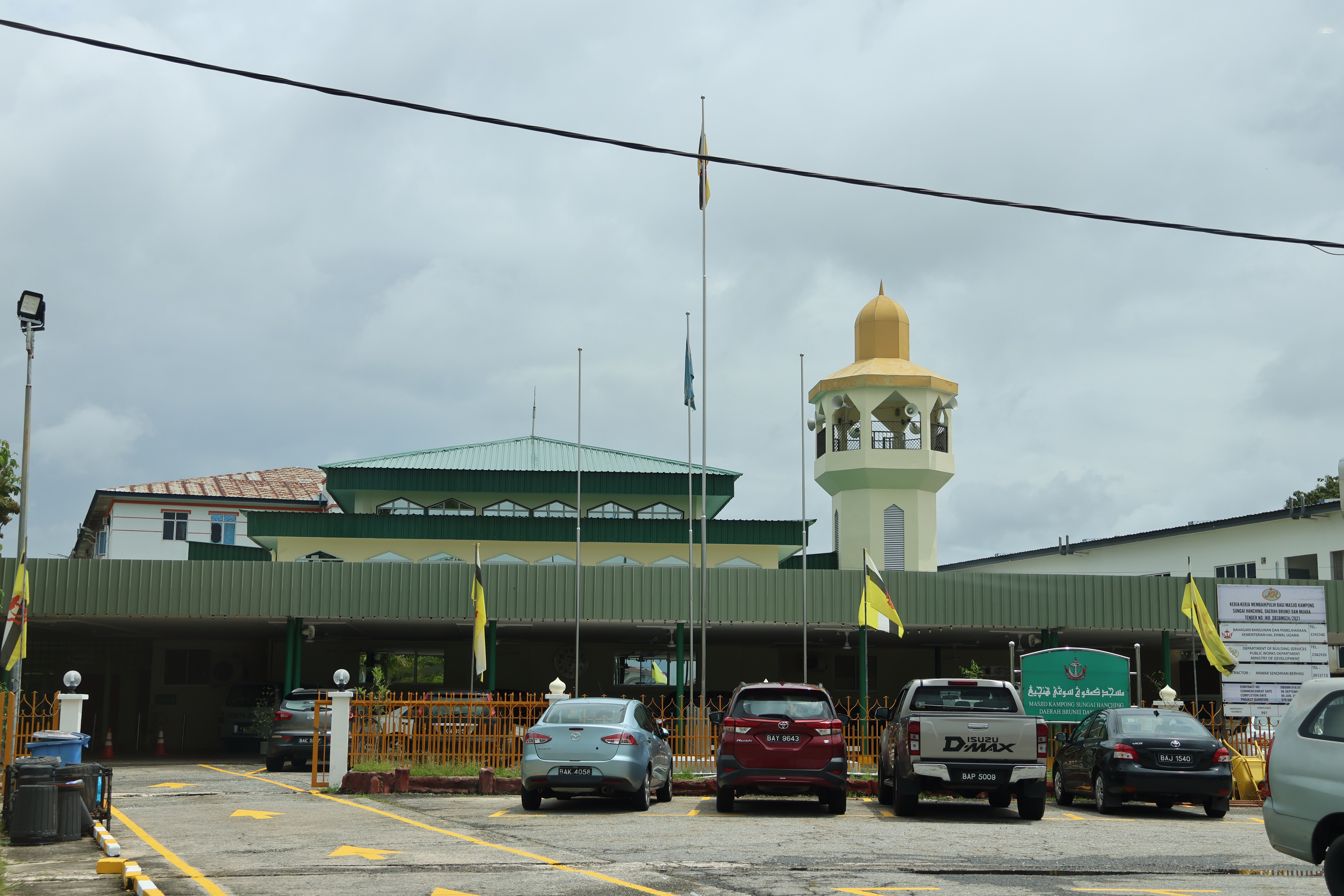
- Kampong Sungai Hanching Mosque

- Location in Brunei
- Coordinates: 4°58′05″N 114°58′40″E
- Country: Brunei
- District: Brunei-Muara
- Mukim: Berakas 'B'

Government
  - Acting Village head: Md Sukairi bin Hj Abd Rahman

Population (2021)
  - Total: 3,189
- Time zone: UTC+8 (BNT)
- Postcode: BC2115

Kampong Sungai Hanching (literally: 'Urine-Reeking River Village') is a village in Brunei-Muara District, Brunei. The population was 3,189 in 2021. It is one of the villages within Mukim Berakas 'B'. The postcode is BC2115.

== Infrastructure ==
On donated property, Awang Haji Muhammad Salleh, a descendent of the well-known Melabau chieftain Panglima Jais, founded Haji Mohd Salleh Primary School, a primary school, in 1947. It also shares grounds with Haji Mohd Salleh Religious School, the village's government school for the country's Islamic religious primary education.

The village mosque is Kampong Sungai Hanching Mosque; it was inaugurated on 12 November 1982 and can accommodate 1,400 worshippers.

The village is also home to the Embassy of Indonesia and China.

== Notable people ==
- Magdalene Teo (died 2021), a Bruneian diplomat
