= Belait River =

River in Brunei

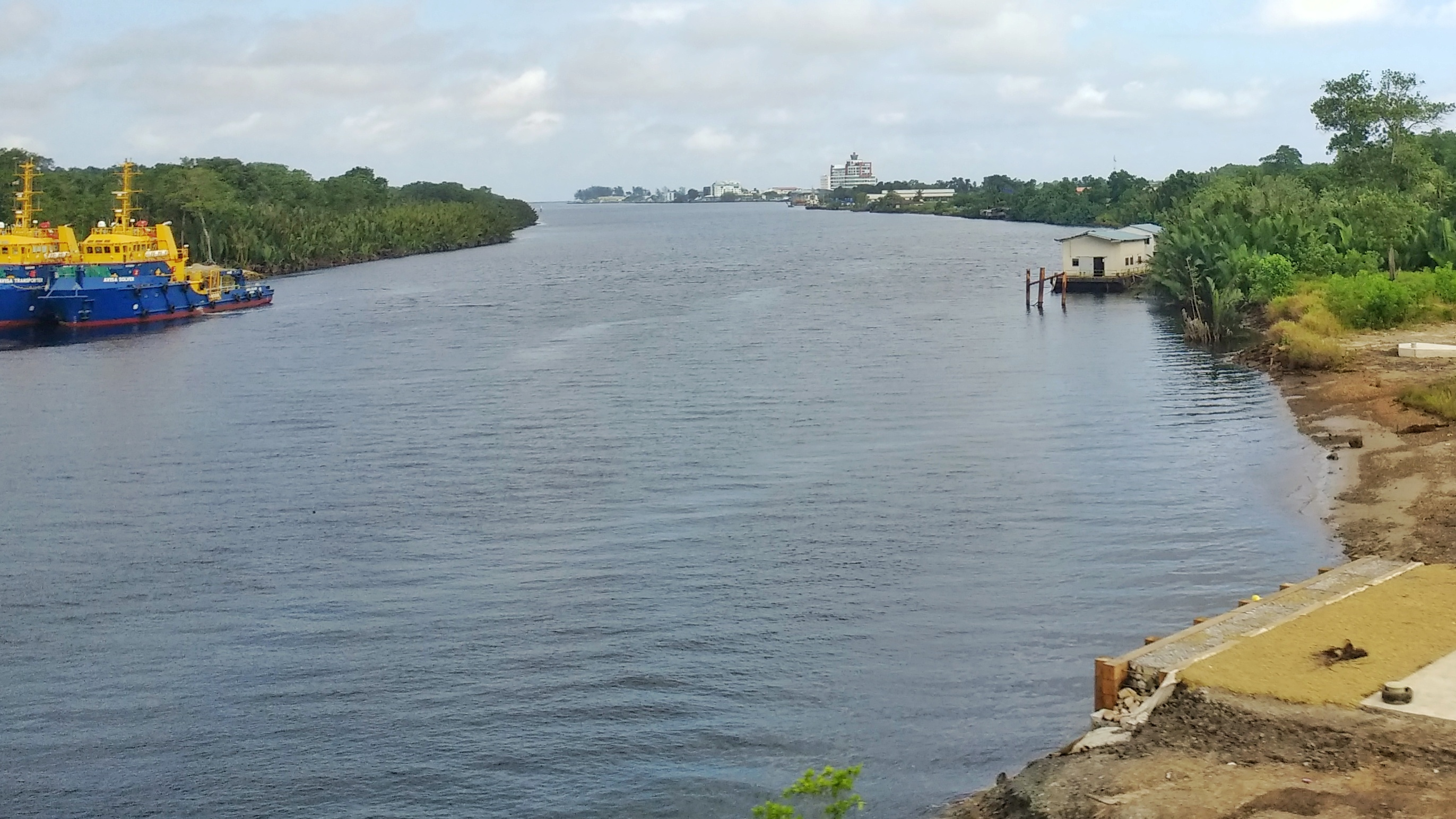
- View of Belait River from Rasau bypass
- Native name: Sungai Belait

Location
- Country: Brunei
- District: Belait

Physical characteristics
- Mouth
  - location: Kuala Belait, Belait, Brunei
  - coordinates: 4.5966693°N 114.1769489°E
  - elevation: 5 m (16 ft)
- Length: 206 km (128 mi)

Basin features
- Tributaries
  - left: Mendaram, Damit
  - right: Pali Bangun

The Belait River (Malay: Sungai Belait) is a river in Belait District, Brunei. It is the longest of the four main rivers in the country.

== History ==
During World War II from 1941 onwards, the whole of Brunei was under Japanese occupation until 1945.

On 26 May 1979, Borneo's only floating drydock arrived in Belait River. After being towed from Melbourne by a Japanese tug for 50 days, the 1943 Australian built drydock, formerly named AD 1001, was acquired by the Kuala Belait Shipyard.

== Sites ==
Kuala Belait is one of the largest human settlements in the district in which the river passes through, while on the west bank lies the Kampong Sungai Teraban and Kampong Rasau. Going upstream will lead to Mukim Kuala Balai.

Some of Brunei's historical sites are located along the river banks, which included the Menara Cendera Kenangan, a monument in celebration of His Majesty's 50th birthday.

Kuala Belait port is one of the three existing ports in Brunei and it's operated by Brunei Shell. A smaller shallow commercial jetty and a marine shipyard lies south of the main port in Kampong Sungai Duhon.

== See also ==
- List of rivers of Brunei
- Kuala Belait
