= Johnie Everett =

Scottish cricketer

Personal information
- Full name: John Everett
- Born: 12 September 1964 (age 62); Kuala Belait, British Borneo
- Batting: Left-handed

Domestic team information
- Years: Team
- 1992: Scotland

Career statistics
Competition	First-class	List A
Matches	1	4
Runs scored	53	24
Batting average	26.50	8.00
100s/50s	–/–	–/–
Top score	33	16
Catches/stumpings	3/–	–/–
- Source: Cricinfo, 5 July 2022

John 'Johnie' Everett (born 12 September 1964) is a Scottish former cricketer.

Everett was born in September 1964 at Kuala Belait in Brunei, which at the time was administered as part of British Borneo. He was educated in Scotland at Trinity College, Glenalmond. A club cricketer for Grange Cricket Club, he played representative cricket for Scotland in 1992. He made a single first-class appearance against Ireland at Dundee, scoring 33 in the Scottish first innings before being dismissed by Charles McCrum, and in their second innings he scored 20 runs before he was dismissed by Conor Hoey. He also played in List A one-day matches, making three appearances in the Benson & Hedges Cup and one in the NatWest Trophy against Somerset at Taunton; he scored 24 runs across these matches, with a highest score of 16.
