= Belait Beach =

Beach in Belait, Brunei

- Pantai Belait
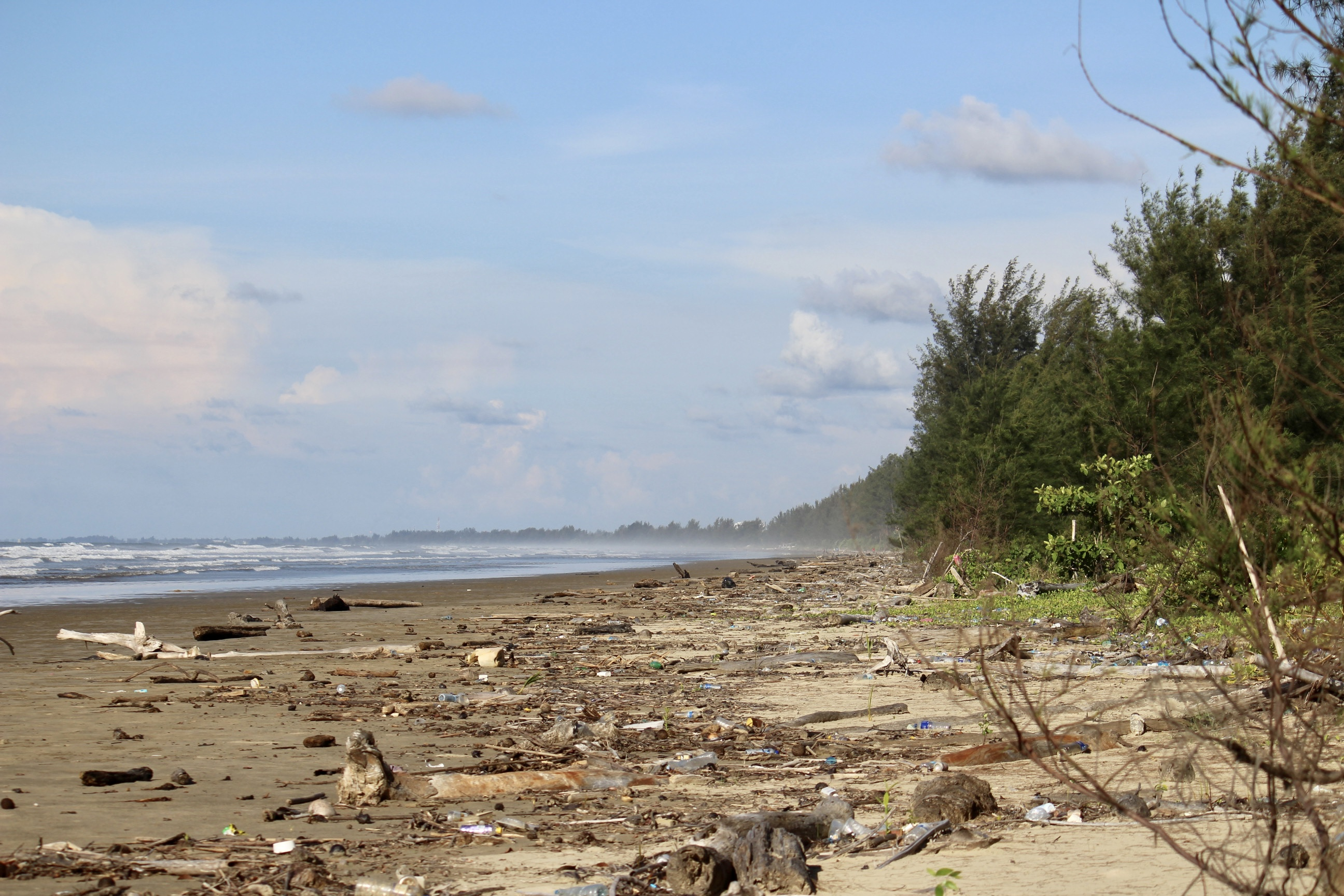

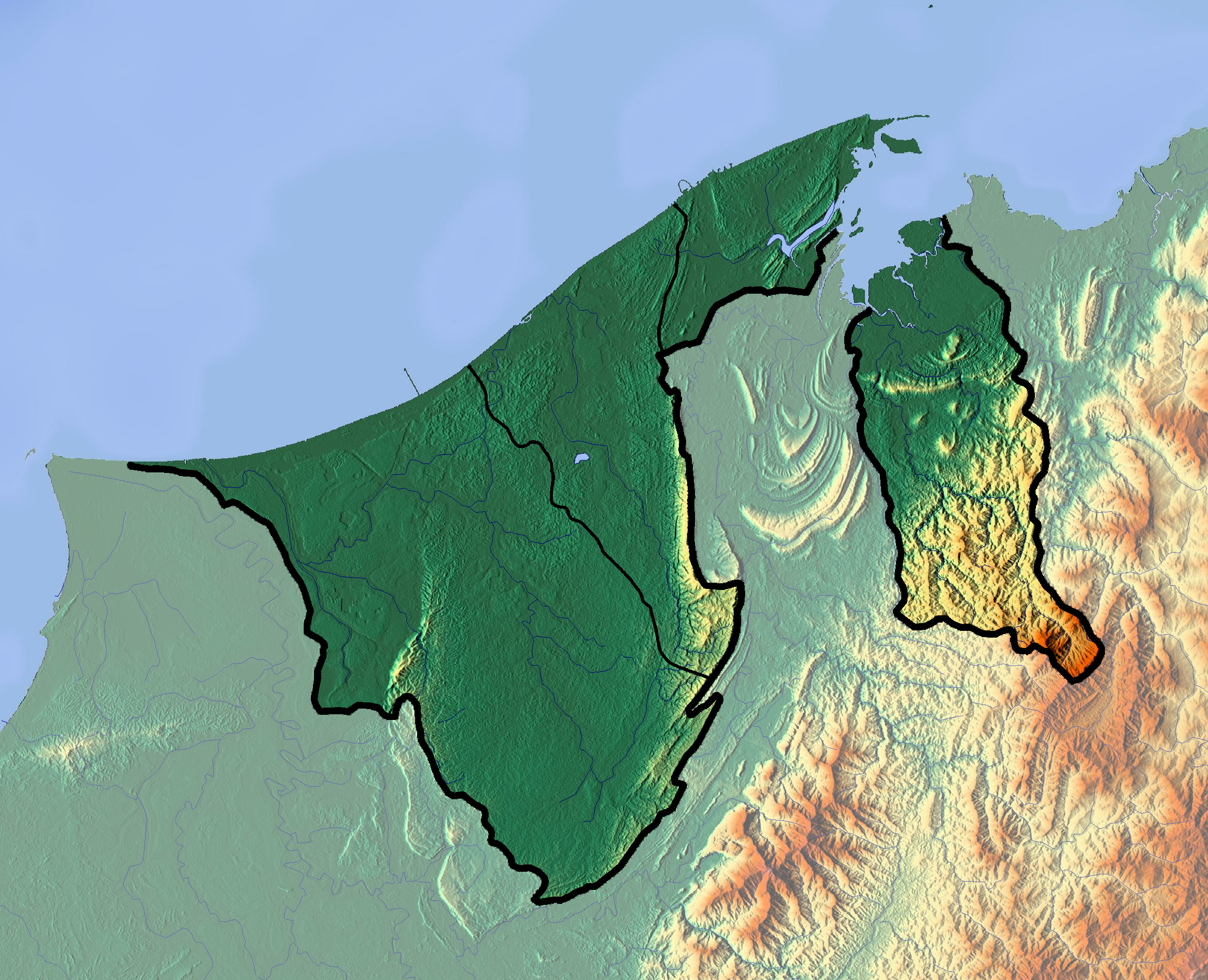
- Location within Brunei
- Location: Kuala Belait, Kuala Belait, Belait
- Nearest city: Bandar Seri Begawan, Brunei-Muara
- Coordinates: 4.5921880°N 114.2121968°E
- Governing body: Kuala Belait and Seria Municipal Department

Belait Beach (Malay: Pantai Belait), also known as Kuala Belait Beach (Malay: Pantai Kuala Belait), is a beach in Kuala Belait, Mukim Kuala Belait, Belait District, Brunei. The beach used to stretch from Kuala Belait to Pelumpong Island but was cut and split at Muara Beach.

Offshore platforms from the South West Ampa Field can also be seen in distance from the beach. Seawalls have been built along the coastline in order to reduce erosion. Activities such as surf fishing do take place on the beach.

== History ==
In 1930, British Malayan Petroleum Company (BMPC) constructed a telephone line along the Belait coastline which linked up Seria and Rasau. As of 1934, the beach was used as a highway between the town and Tutong District. In which a ferry would take passengers across the Tutong River separating the two districts.

At midnight on 16 December 1941, an amphibious assault was carried out by 10,000 soldiers from the Japanese Kawaguchi Detachment at Belait Beach as part of the Japanese occupation of British Borneo during World War II.

From 2001 to 2005, the Eighth National Development Plan (RKN 8) aimed to build a car park and dumping ground within two separate plans. On 2 February 2020, a company was issued a penalty for illegal dumping on the beach.
