= Rasau =

Onshore oil field in Brunei

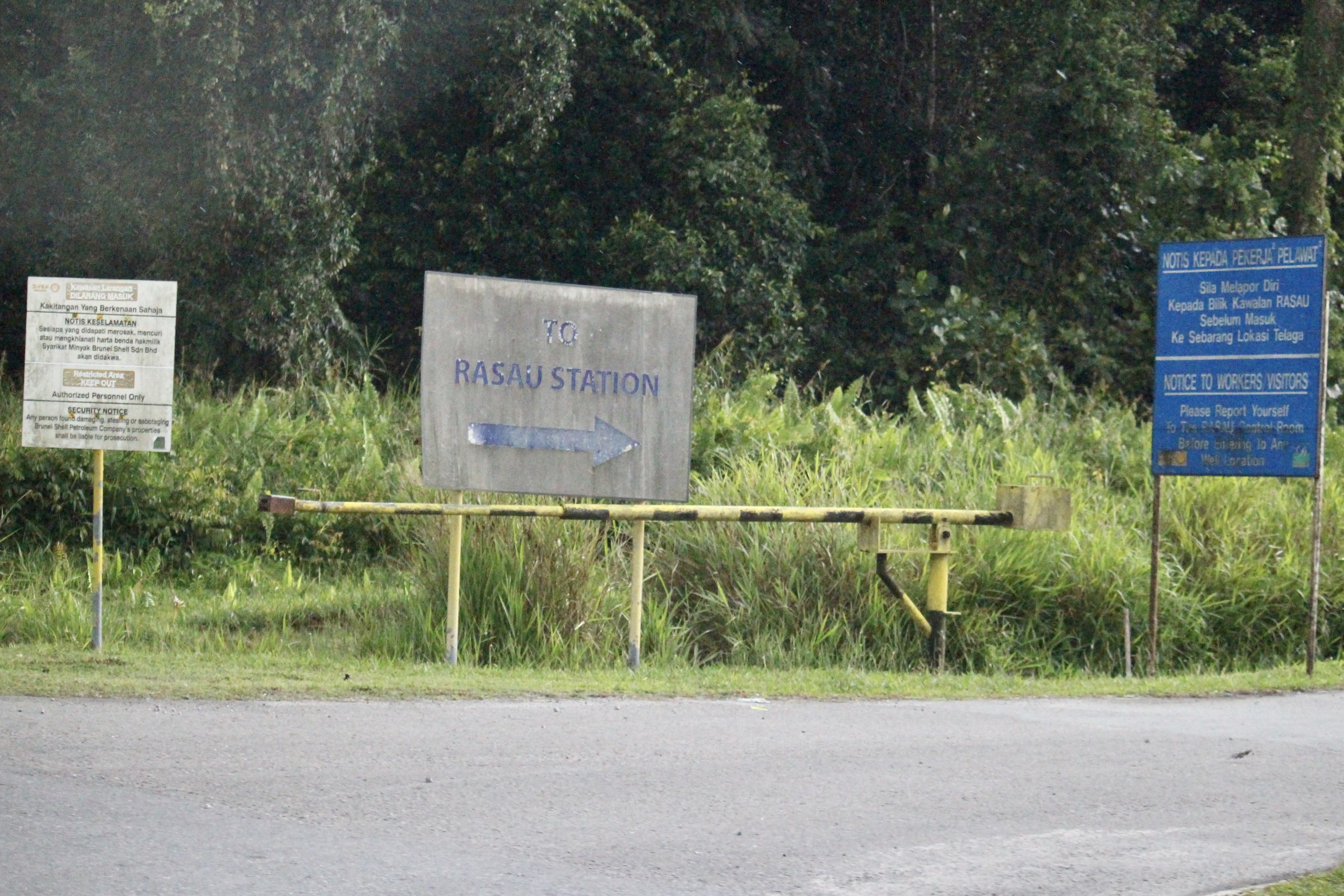
- A sign leading to Rasau Station in 2022

- Location within Brunei
- Country: Brunei
- Region: Belait
- Location: Rasau
- Offshore/onshore: Onshore
- Coordinates: 4°34′N 114°11′E
- Operators: Brunei Shell Petroleum
- Owner: Brunei Shell Petroleum (50%); Government of Brunei (50%)

Field history
- Discovery: 1979
- Start of production: 1983

Production
- Peak of production (oil): 250,000 barrels per day (~1.2×10^{7} t/a)

Rasau, formerly known as Kampong Rasau, is an area in Brunei that comprises a village and one of the country's many oil fields. It is situated in the Belait District on the west bank of the Belait River, just south of Kampong Sungai Teraban and near the administrative centre, Kuala Belait. Rasau was previously classified as one of the villages within Mukim Kuala Belait.

== History ==
Rasau was historically one of the first stops on the Belait River upriver from Kuala Belait towards the former district administrative capital of Kuala Balai. It was founded further inland from the mouth of the Belait River and Kuala Belait for protection against pirates. A timber jetty used to exist in the area in 1930. Moreover, latter that year, British Malayan Petroleum Company constructed a telephone line along the Kuala Belait Beach which linked up Seria and Rasau with their main headquarters in Kuala Belait.

The neighbouring ASEAN Bridge, which intends to ease cross-border traffic and promote economic growth, supports Kampong Rasau's prospective development as a border town in late 2016. Kampong Rasau was situated inside the Sungai Teraban local plan region. The area covers 2,630 hectares (6,500 acres) from the west of the Belait River to the Brunei–Malaysia border, including forest swamps and BSP concession land. While Kampong Rasau itself is small, it benefits from local amenities such as a primary school, multi-purpose hall, clinic, and mosque. The local plan identifies unbalanced development between the east and west sides of the Belait River and stresses the need to research the ecological impact on forest swamp areas and explore the potential of the Belait River as an internal port to support economic activities in the region.

== Economy ==
=== Oil and gas ===
Rasau is centred around the Rasau oil field, one of only two onshore oil fields in Brunei. Discovered in 1979, the field played a key role in boosting the country's oil production to 250,000 barrels per day at the time. Operated by Brunei Shell Petroleum (BSP), the Rasau Production Station is located within the area and is connected by pipelines to tank farms in Seria via Mumong, and to the Seria refinery through Kuala Belait. Additionally, hydrocarbons from Malaysia's Asam Paya field in neighbouring Sarawak are piped into Rasau.

=== Shipbuilding ===
In May 1982, the Rasau shipyard in Kuala Belait built and launched the first floating dock constructed in Brunei, which slid quietly down its slipway into the Belait River after 18 months of construction. The dock, launched from the Tanjung Rasau yard about 1.6 kilometres (0.99 mi) upriver from the town, was a new design by Vickers in Sydney and was the largest of its kind in the world. It was capable of handling vessels up to 100 feet (30 m) long and weighing 100 tonnes (98 long tons; 110 short tons). This new dock worked alongside its larger sister dock, which could handle ships up to 1,200 tonnes, both moored in the Belait River. Together, they were able to service any vessels able to cross the shallow bar at the river's mouth.

The new 'B' dock was intended primarily for smaller offshore vessels, which made up around 70 per cent of the fleet entering the river, while the larger dock managed bigger ships. Prior to the new dock's arrival, the existing dock had been in continuous use and was unable to accommodate the smaller boats despite available labour. The new dock operated on the submarine principle, submerging by filling large tubular ballast tanks with water to float vessels in, then using compressed air to force the water out and create a dry dock for repairs. The larger dock had been towed to Kuala Belait three years earlier and was the first facility of its kind in Brunei, Sabah, or Sarawak.

== Infrastructure ==
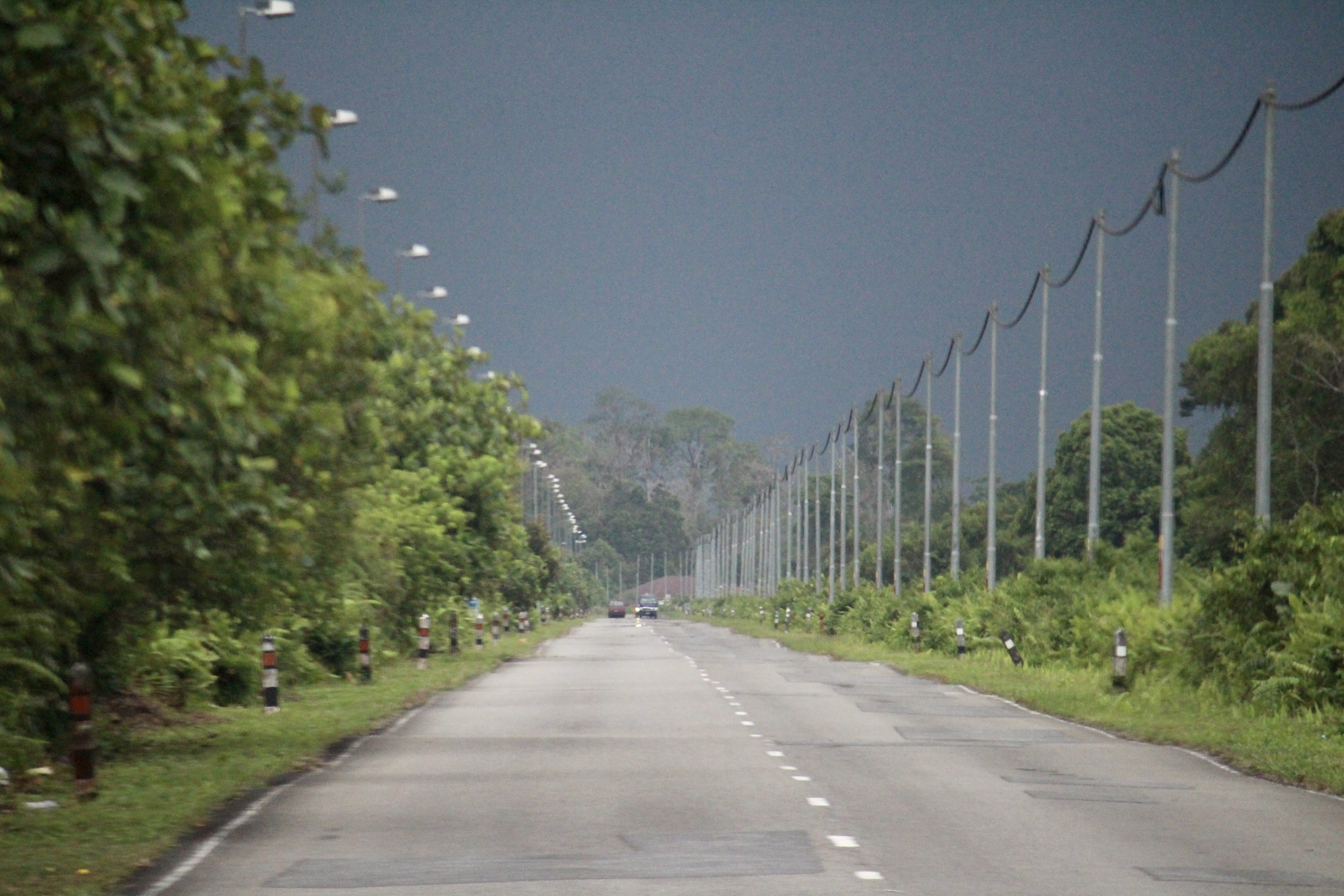
Jalan Rasau in 2022

The Rasau Bridge, which spans the Belait River, provides a direct route from Brunei to the Sungai Tujoh Immigration Checkpoint, eliminating the need for the often frustrating ferry service. Travellers using the bridge were required to pay a toll. However, on 15 December 2022, the Public Works Department (JKR) announced the demolition of the Rasau Bridge Toll building. Traffic was diverted around the demolition site, with work lasting for six weeks.

Rasau is part of an 11-kilometre road connecting Sungai Teraban and Sungai Tujoh, which facilitates easier travel between Brunei and Sarawak's Miri Division, including Miri and surrounding areas. The road, Jalan Rasau, is a single carriageway and it is surfaced.

== Incidents ==
Block SK333 was discovered in 1979, with production commencing in 1983. In April 1989, the field experienced a major incident when well Rasau-17 suffered a blowout. The resulting fire burned from 25 April until it was finally extinguished on 8 May. By the time the fire was brought under control nearly two weeks later, all drilling equipment at the site had completely melted, leaving no identifiable remains. This incident exposed serious shortcomings in the existing oil spill contingency procedures, which had last been updated in January 1988. It highlighted the reality that no plan can anticipate every potential complication, reinforcing the importance of regularly reviewing and improving response strategies based on real-world events. Additionally, the blowout revealed a flawed assumption held by some government officials that BSP could manage any oil spill, even those unrelated to its operations, without government assistance. This expectation proved unrealistic, underscoring the urgent need for the government to develop its own comprehensive oil spill response plans.
