= Kuala Belait =

Town in Brunei

- Municipal area and town
- Pekan Kuala Belait ڤكن کوالا بلایت
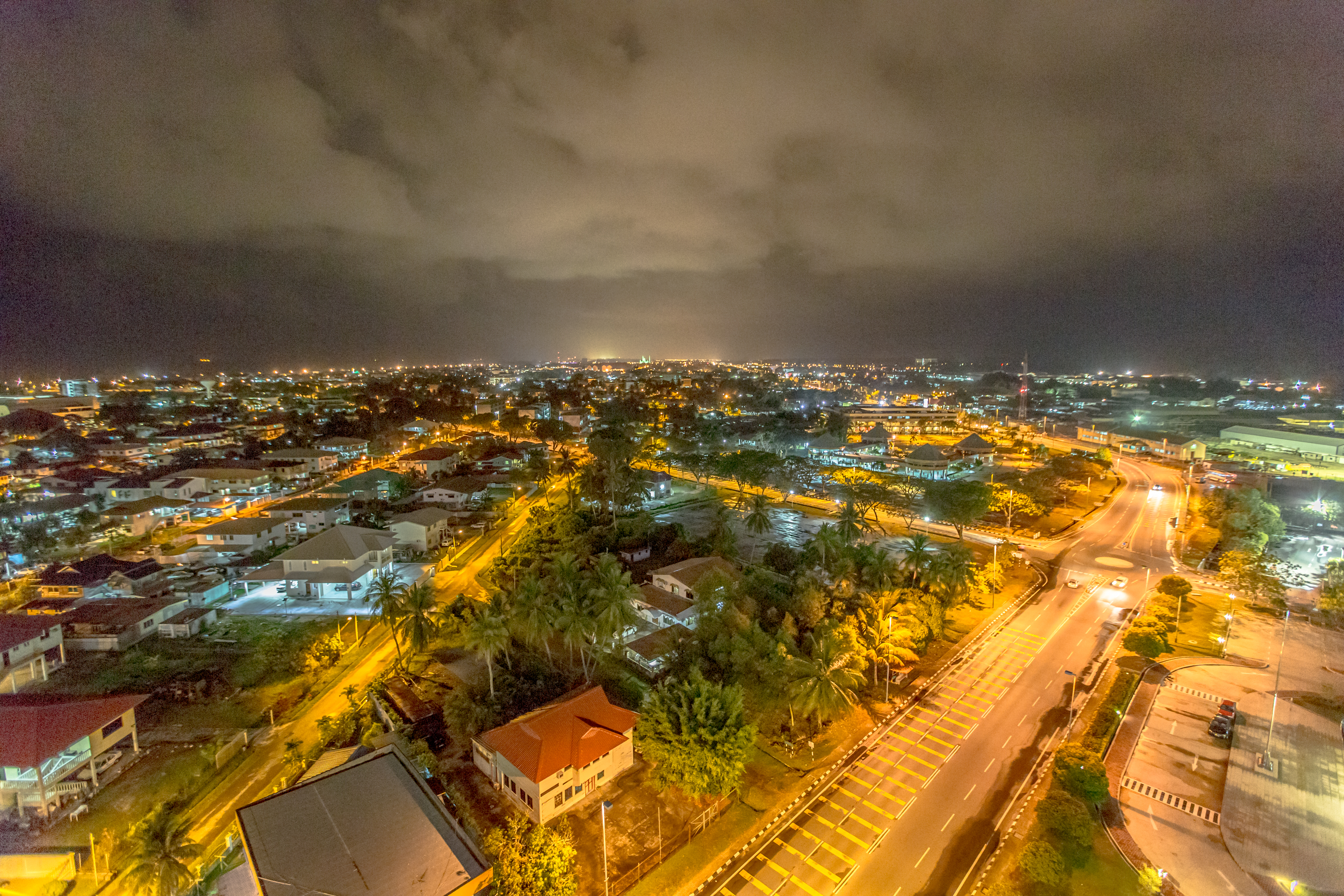
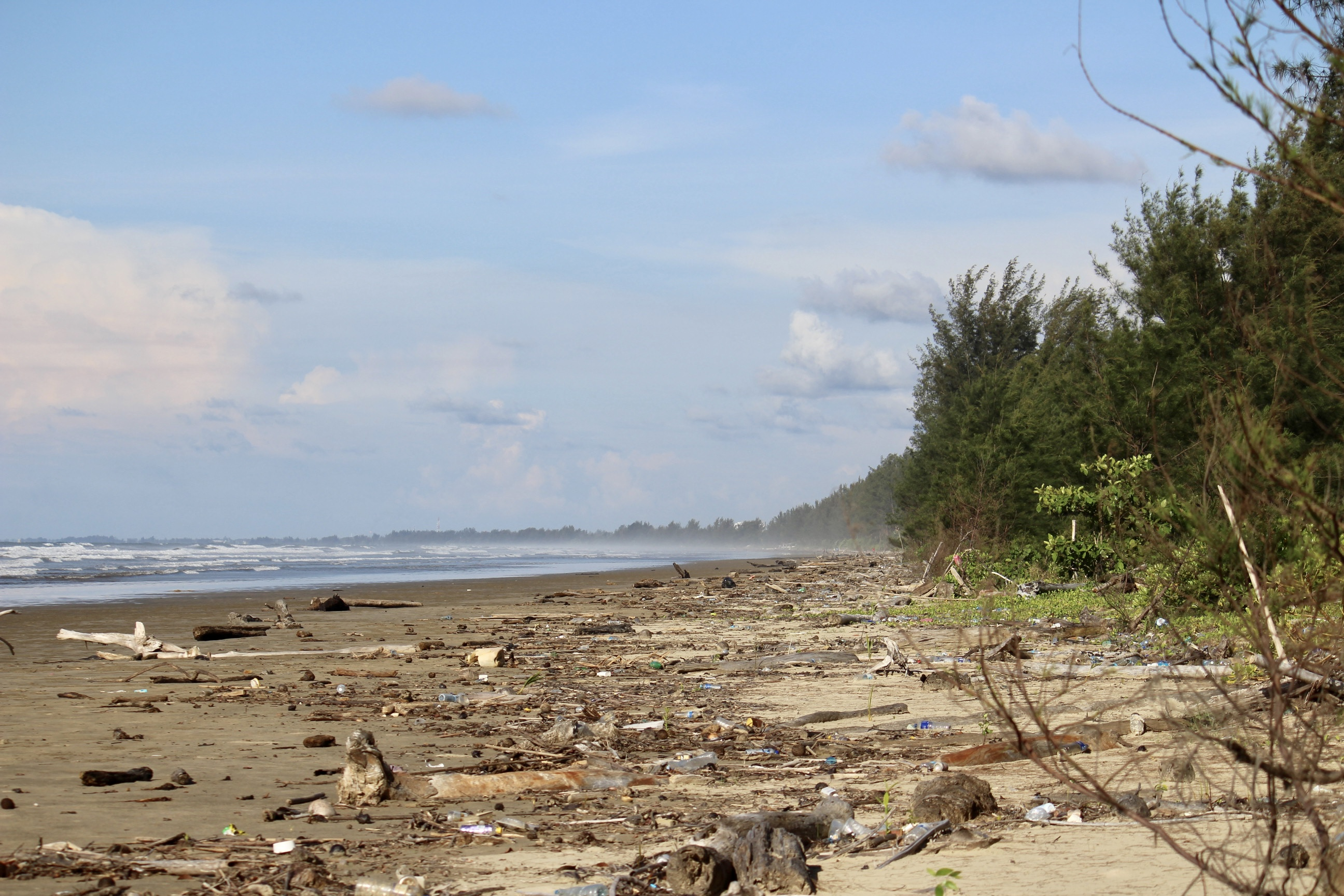
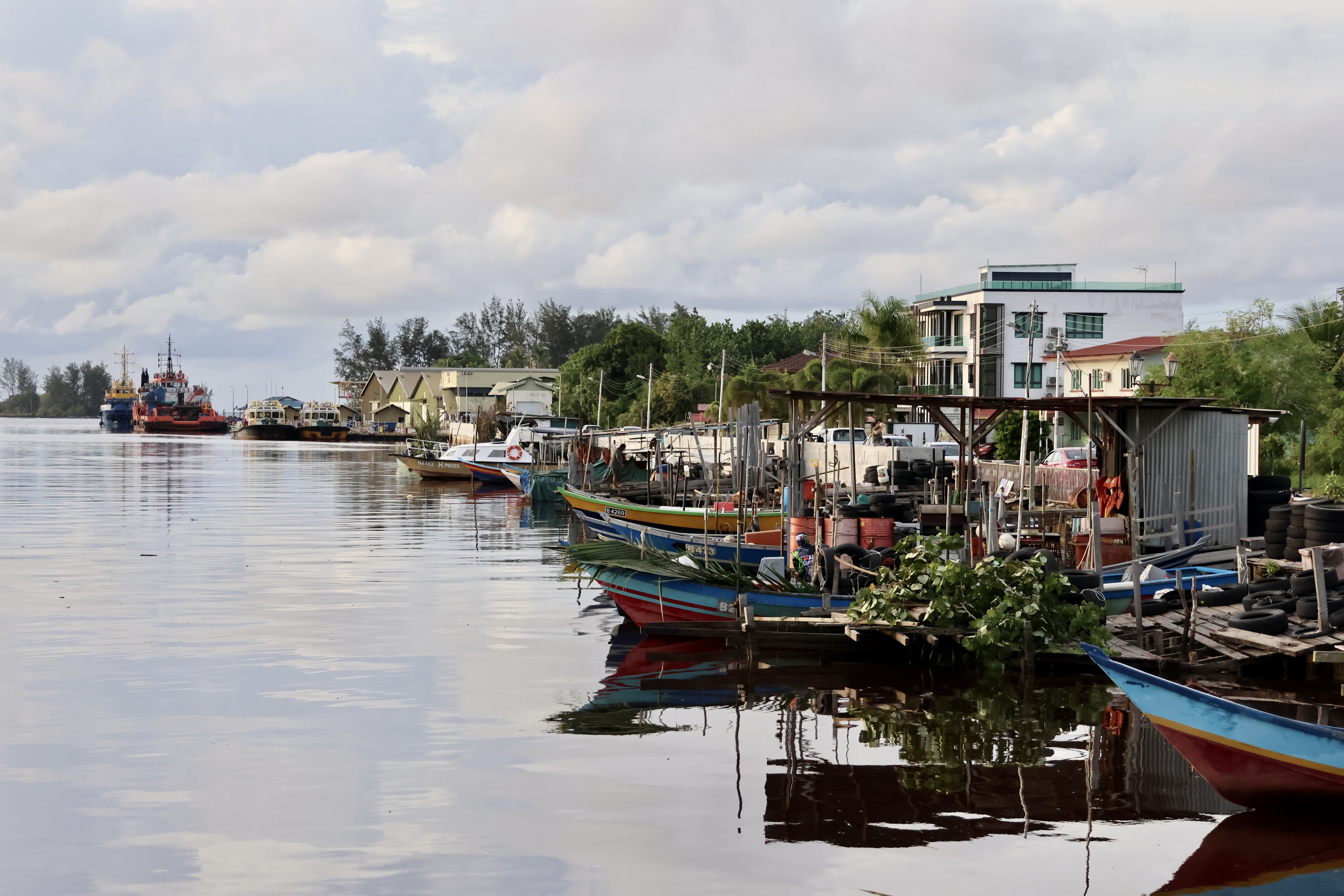
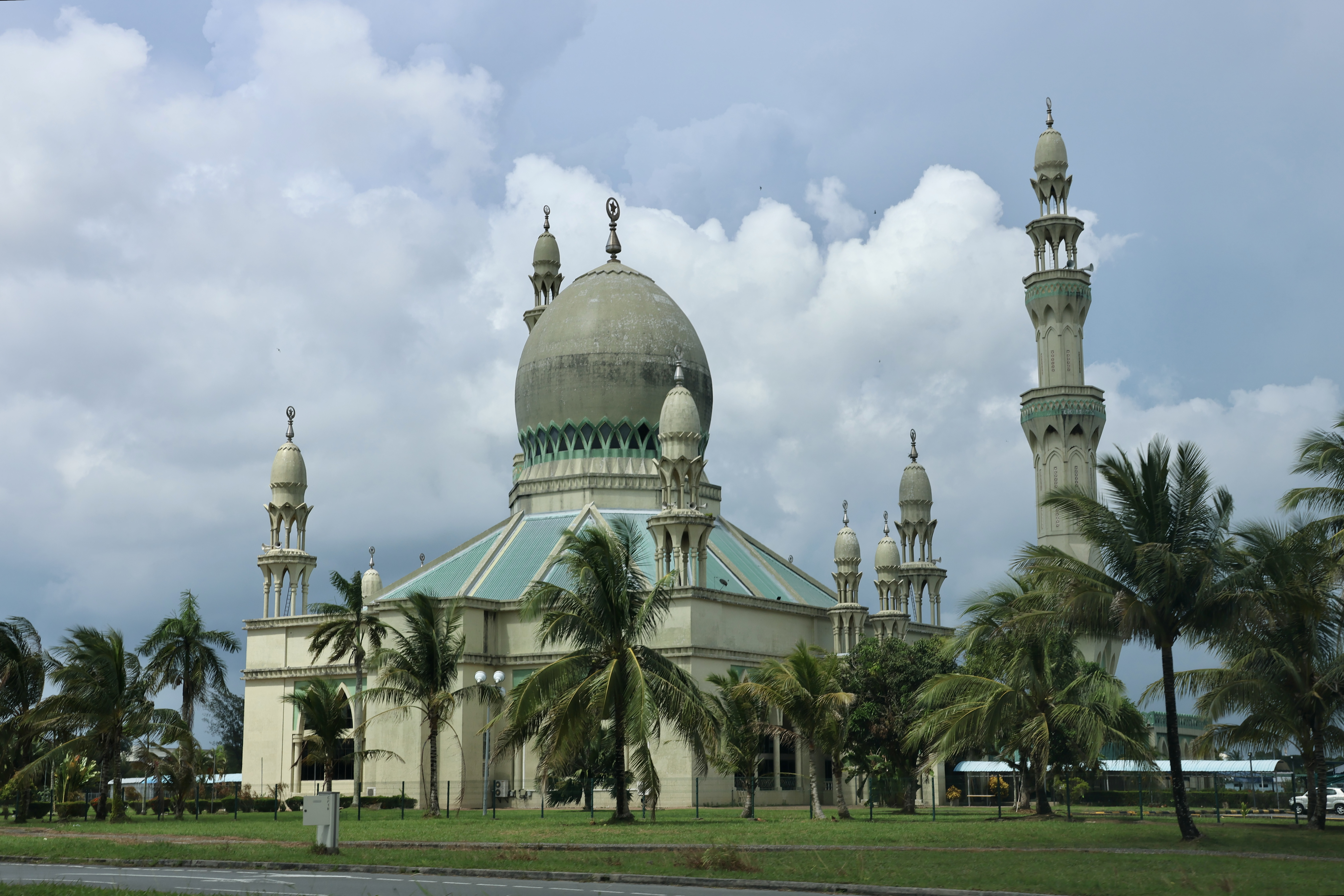
- Clockwise from top left: Kuala Belait at night, Belait Beach, Kampong Pandan Mosque, Belait River

- Location in Brunei
- Coordinates: 4°34′58″N 114°11′30″E
- Country: Brunei
- District: Belait
- Mukim: Kuala Belait
- Municipality: 1929

Government
  - Village head: Sufrizal Hamdan

Population (2021)
  - Total: 4,544
- Time zone: UTC+8 (BNT)
- Postcode: KA1131
- Website: bandaran-kb.gov.bn

Kuala Belait (Note: Malay pronunciation: [ˈkuala bəlait]; Jawi: کوالا بلایت; Chinese: 马来奕; pinyin: Mǎláiyì) (KB) or officially the Kuala Belait Town (Malay: Pekan Kuala Belait), is the administrative town of Belait District, Brunei. The population of the town proper was 4,544 in 2021. Kuala Belait is officially a municipal area (kawasan bandaran), as well as a settlement under the mukim of the same name. The town is located 85 kilometres (53 mi) west of the country's capital Bandar Seri Begawan, and 20 kilometres (12 mi) west of Seria, the district's other town. It is also in the westernmost part of country, near the mouth of the Belait River.

== Etymology ==
The name "Kuala Belait" originates from the Malay words kuala, meaning "river mouth" or "confluence," and Belait, referring to the Belait River and the indigenous Belait people who inhabit the region. This naming reflects the town's geographical position at the mouth of the Belait River, where it empties into the South China Sea. As with other kuala settlements, the location was likely chosen for its strategic significance, offering both defensive advantages and accessibility for trade and transportation along the river and coastal routes.

== History ==
Before 1909, Kuala Belait was a small fishing village with little development. Although oil exploration began in the Belait District as early as 1911, and some oil was found in Labi in 1914, it had minimal impact on Kuala Belait's growth at that time. However, the discovery of oil in Labi convinced prospectors that further deposits might be found along the higher banks of the Belait River. That same year, a 60-mile (97 km) road was constructed, linking Kuala Belait to Brunei Town.

Oil companies began concentrating their activities in the area, leading to the emergence of a thriving village in Kuala Belait by 1927. At the time, it served as a port for transporting machinery crucial to oil prospecting, primarily managed by the British Malayan Petroleum Company (BMPC). Kuala Belait soon became a key entry point to the upper reaches of the Belait River, and the government recognised its growing significance by establishing it as the headquarters of the Belait District that same year. In 1929, BMPC followed suit by relocating its headquarters to Kuala Belait, further boosting the village's development. The discovery of large oil reserves in Seria, in April 1929, significantly increased Kuala Belait's importance as a strategic hub for the oil industry. During the oil boom, the position of Assistant British Resident was reinstated and based in the town to oversee British oil interests, marking the town's growing administrative significance in Brunei's petroleum sector. In that same year, Kuala Belait became a town after the establishment of the Kuala Belait Sanitary Board, which is run by the Assistant Resident.

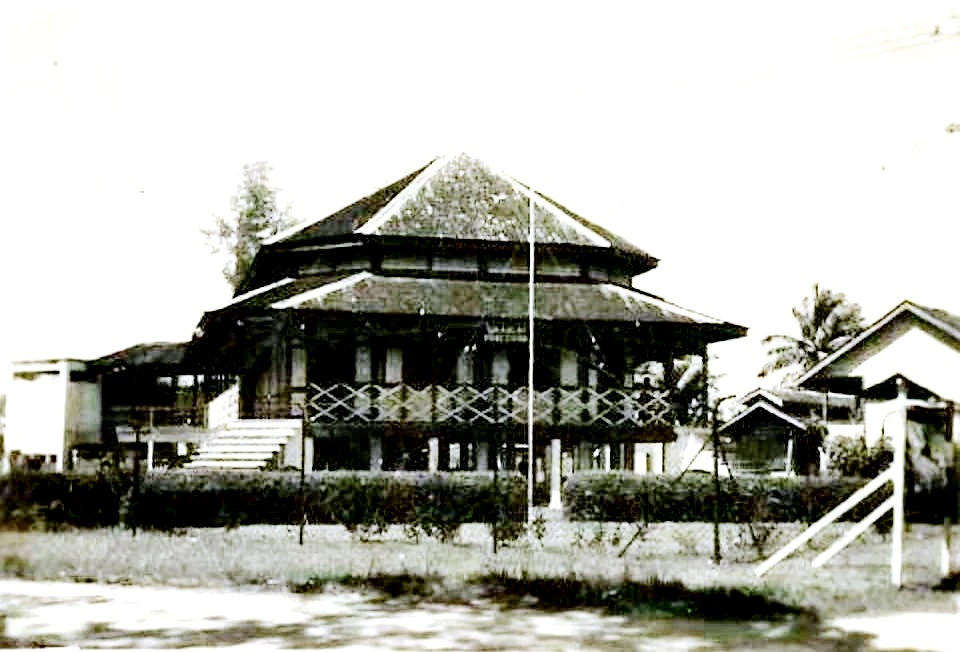
Kuala Belait police station in 1933

The 1930s marked a period of rapid growth for Kuala Belait, largely driven by the BMPC. In 1931, the town became the site of Brunei's first English school, and it also boasted the best hospital in the country at the time. Its population grew significantly, from 1,193 in 1931 to 3,000 by 1935, fueled by the thriving oil industry. Despite this progress, the town was heavily bombed during World War II, leading to widespread destruction and the need to rebuild. The BMPC also played a crucial role in infrastructure development, constructing a telephone line along the Belait coastline earlier in 1930, linking Seria and Rasau to their headquarters in Kuala Belait. However, a telephone line connecting Kuala Belait to Tutong was dismantled in 1934 after failing to meet expectations. By 1939, pipelines and roads between Kuala Belait and Miri had been established, further enhancing the town's connectivity and industrial growth.

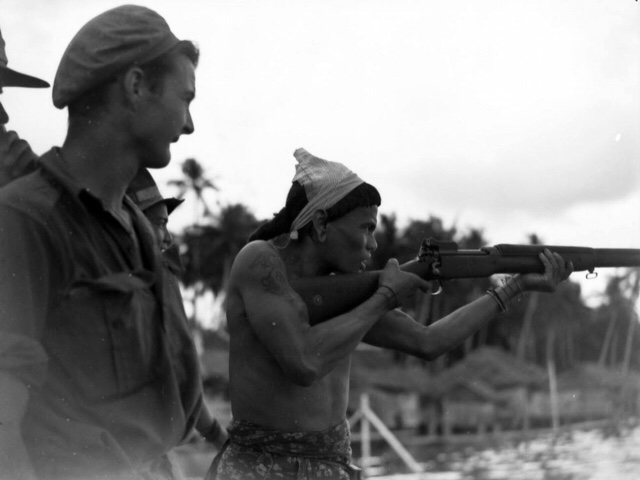
A local armed with a Lee-Enfield rifle under the supervision of an Australian soldier in 1945

On 16 December 1941, Kuala Belait was captured after an amphibious assault on the Belait coast by 10,000 soldiers from the Japanese Kawaguchi Detachment. The town remained under Japanese occupation during World War II. During this time, war crimes were committed by the Japanese, including the massacre and execution of Indian prisoners of wars (POW) from the 2/15th Punjab Regiment. Additionally, 55 Indian prisoners died from starvation in the town's POW camp. As part of Operation Oboe Six, the Australian 9th Division arrived in Kuala Belait on 24 June 1945, leading to the recapture of the port. In 1949, reconstruction plans for the war-torn town were approved.

In 1950, concerned about the potential spread of Chinese Communist ideology among Kuala Belait's urban working-class population, the Brunei government relocated the police headquarters from Brunei Town to Kuala Belait and established both a Criminal Investigation Department and a Special Branch to enhance security. The town experienced significant growth during the 1950s and 1960s, spurred by increased revenue from the booming oil industry. Post-war development transformed Kuala Belait, with the construction of reinforced concrete shophouses, government offices, godowns, and a wharf, alongside improvements to roads and health facilities that modernised the town by the early 1950s. In 1952, plans were initiated to build a country palace for Sultan Omar Ali Saifuddien III in Kuala Belait—he had previously stayed at the rest house during visits—highlighting the town's rising status and the Omar Ali's growing prestige. The same period saw the upgrade of the Sanitary Board to a Municipal Board in 1953. However, British experts expressed scepticism about large-scale infrastructure projects, particularly the proposal to build a modern 175-bed hospital, arguing that the town's population would likely decline after the oil boom. They warned that such a facility might become a white elephant and instead recommended a temporary hospital, while questioning the broader value of heavy investment in the area.

The discovery of the first offshore gas field, South West Ampa, located 13 kilometres (8.1 mi) off Kuala Belait in 1963, further boosted the town's growth. During the 1962 Brunei revolt, TKNU rebels briefly gained control of the town, but the town was soon liberated by the 1/2nd Battalion Gurkha Rifles Regiment, with local police successfully defending the police station.

After Brunei's independence in 1984, several new government buildings were constructed to house local services. In the 1990s, the coastal road from Muara to Kuala Belait was upgraded to a four-lane highway, further enhancing the town's infrastructure. The Municipal Board was overseen by the Belait District Officer from 31 October 1985. From 1 November 1985, the municipality has been administered by a chairman. By 1997, it had become Brunei's second-largest town, following Bandar Seri Begawan. Often referred to as a "Shell town," much of its postwar development was attributed to Shell's efforts.

== Governance ==
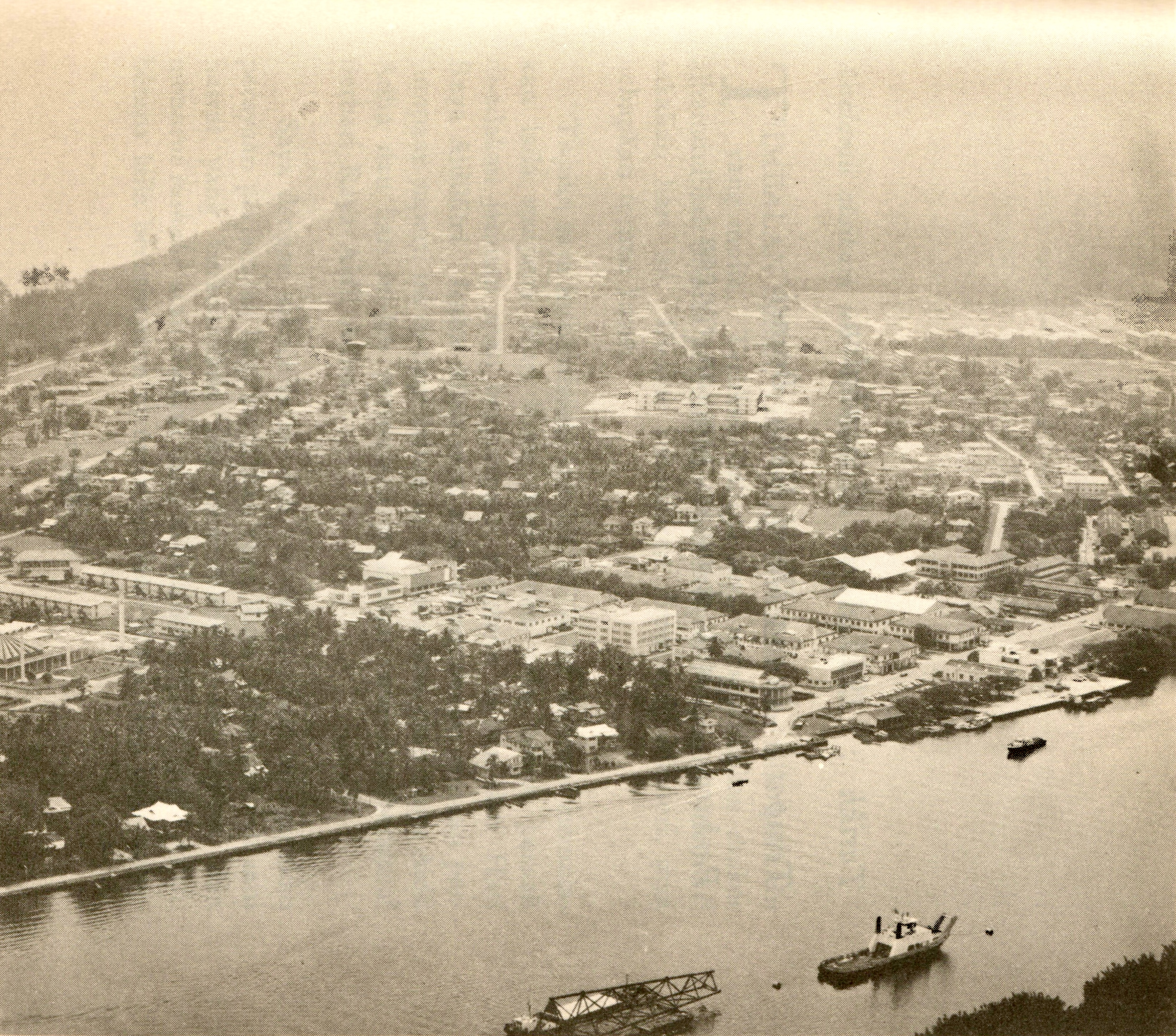
c. 1965 aerial view of the town, with the Belait River in the foreground

=== Administrative division ===
The area of Kuala Belait comprises territorial division which can be informally grouped into three main areas: Pekan Kuala Belait or Kuala Belait Town, and Kampong Pandan and Mumong suburbs. The latter two areas are further divided into three and two kampongs or villages respectively. Pekan Kuala Belait is also officially a kampong-level administrative division. All of the villages constitute almost all of Mukim Kuala Belait, a subdistrict of Belait.

=== Local authority and town definition ===
The town of Kuala Belait is administered under Jabatan Bandaran Kuala Belait dan Seria (Kuala Belait and Seria Municipal Department), a government department under Kementerian Hal Ehwal Dalam Negeri (the Ministry of Home Affairs). The department comprises Lembaga Bandaran or the Municipal Board, which is headed by Pengerusi Lembaga Bandaran (Chairman of the Municipal Board). The current chairman is Ridzuan Haji Ahmad.

=== Overlapping territory ===
The area under the authority of the Municipal Department overlaps with that under Jabatan Daerah Belait or the Belait District Office. The municipal area consists of Pekan Kuala Belait, the whole of Kampong Pandan suburb, and parts of Mumong suburb. However, all of the kampongs are also under the governance of the Belait District Office, since they constitute the proper subdivisions of the district and subdistricts, and subsequently the headmen of the kampongs, known as ketua kampong (with the exception of Pekan Kuala Belait since there is none assigned), answers to the Pegawai Daerah or District Officer.

== Economy ==
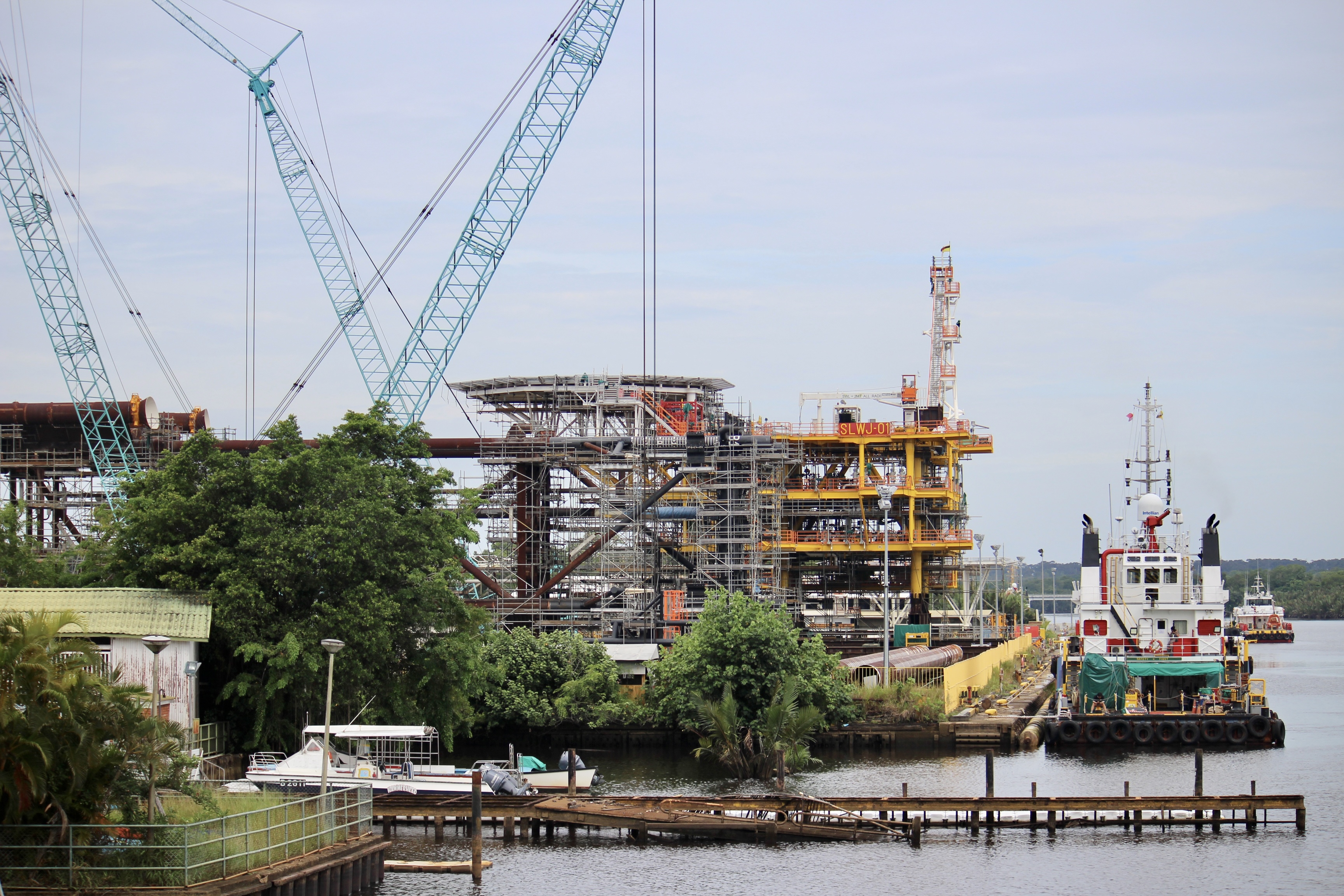
Marine Construction Yard in Sungai Duhon, 2022

=== Oil and gas ===
Kuala Belait is located in the vicinity of the onshore Rasau gas field. However Brunei Shell has various facilities in town to support the oil and gas production facilities in the vicinity.

The Kuala Belait Bunkering Station (KBBS) is located near the mouth of the Belait River. It supplies domestic gas to the town and other bulk chemicals in support of the various activities. The Kuala Belait Wharf is the main point from which personnel to and from the offshore platforms, off the Belait districts, embark and disembark.

=== Marine ===
The Kuala Belait supply base is located to the south of the wharf, and is the main point for logistics for Shell. The Marine Construction Yard (MCY) in Sungai Duhon, commonly known as SCO, is where construction of marine structures are carried out prior to installation offshore.

== Demography ==
Kampong Kuala Balai has historically served as the Belait population's hub. However, the population has scattered over the past 50 years, and now, Belait tribe members may be found in and around the town. By 1938, Kuala Belait's population had increased to 5,000, and the BMPC was the city's major employer, with 1,185 out of 2,265 workers under its payroll. 1,193 people were counted in Kuala Belait at the time of the 1931 census. It was reportedly 12,000 in 1948, due to the development around the district's oilfield. The town has a sizable Chinese population, and most Europeans are concentrated in Kuala Belait and Seria.

== Climate ==
The climate of Kuala Belait is tropical. The weather is warm, humid and rainy all year.

Month	Jan	Feb	Mar	Apr	May	Jun	Jul	Aug	Sep	Oct	Nov	Dec	Year
Average High (°C)	31	31	32	33	33	33	33	33	32	32	32	32	-
Average Low (°C)	24	24	24	24	24	24	24	24	24	24	24	24	-
Average Rainfall (mm)	360	200	190	287	288	226	196	219	250	284	260	297	3045

== Transportation ==
=== Road ===
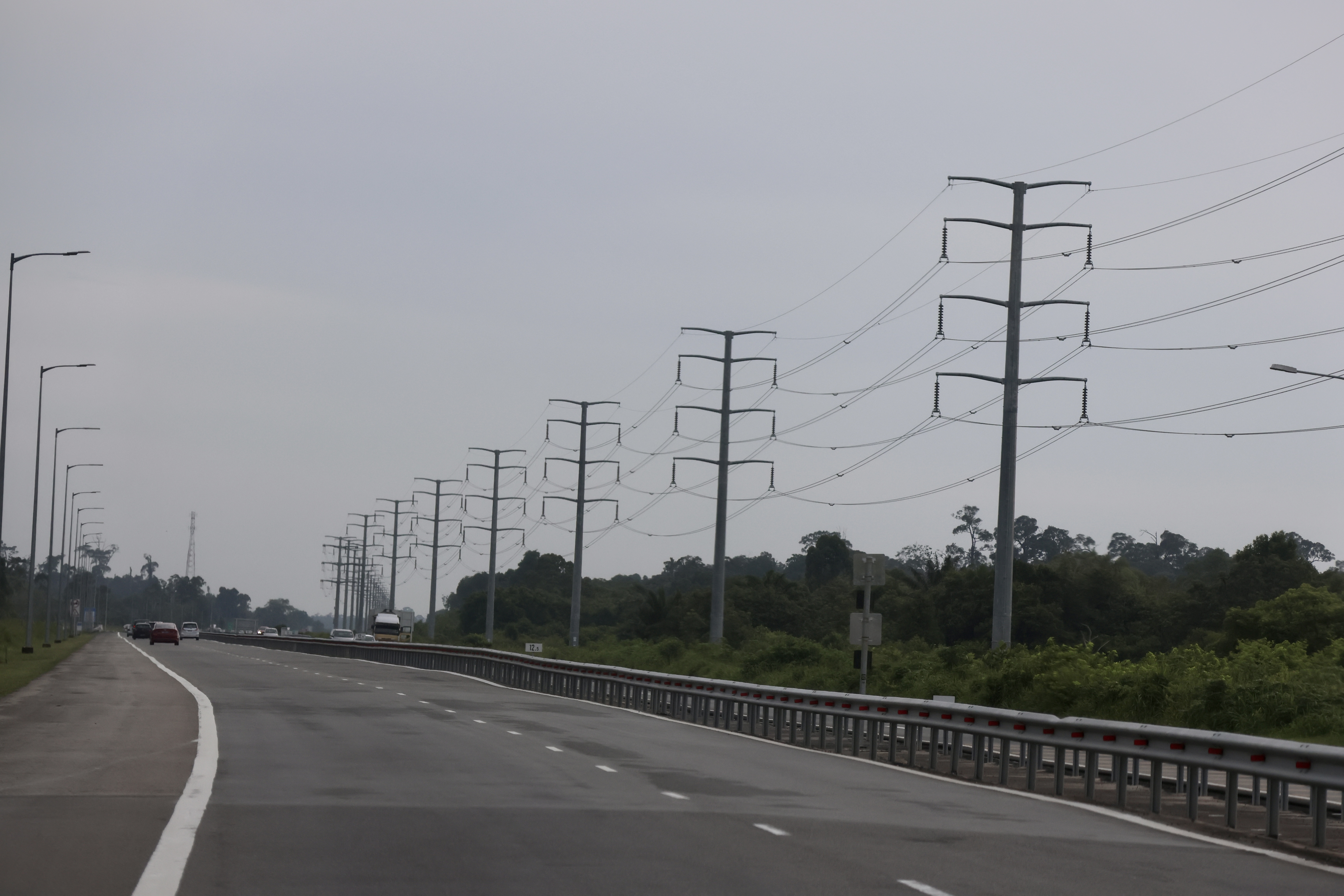
Lumut–Belait Highway in 2023

Road transportation in Kuala Belait has evolved significantly, particularly following the discovery of oil. Initially, communication with the capital was challenging, as access by land required traveling along the beach between Kuala Belait and Tutong, where a road existed. In 1931, the appointment of an assistant British Resident marked a turning point, although land connections with Brunei Town remained difficult. The BMPC played a crucial role in enhancing road infrastructure, providing necessary improvements to support the growing immigrant population associated with the oilfields. By 1938, the population of Kuala Belait had reached 5,000, with the BMPC being the largest employer in the district and continuing to invest in local infrastructure. In the 21st century, most roads in Kuala Belait are surfaced, and there are bus services transporting passengers to Miri. The Lumut–Belait Highway connects the Malaysian border west of Sungai Tujoh with various highways that lead to Bandar Seri Begawan and Muara town.

=== Water ===
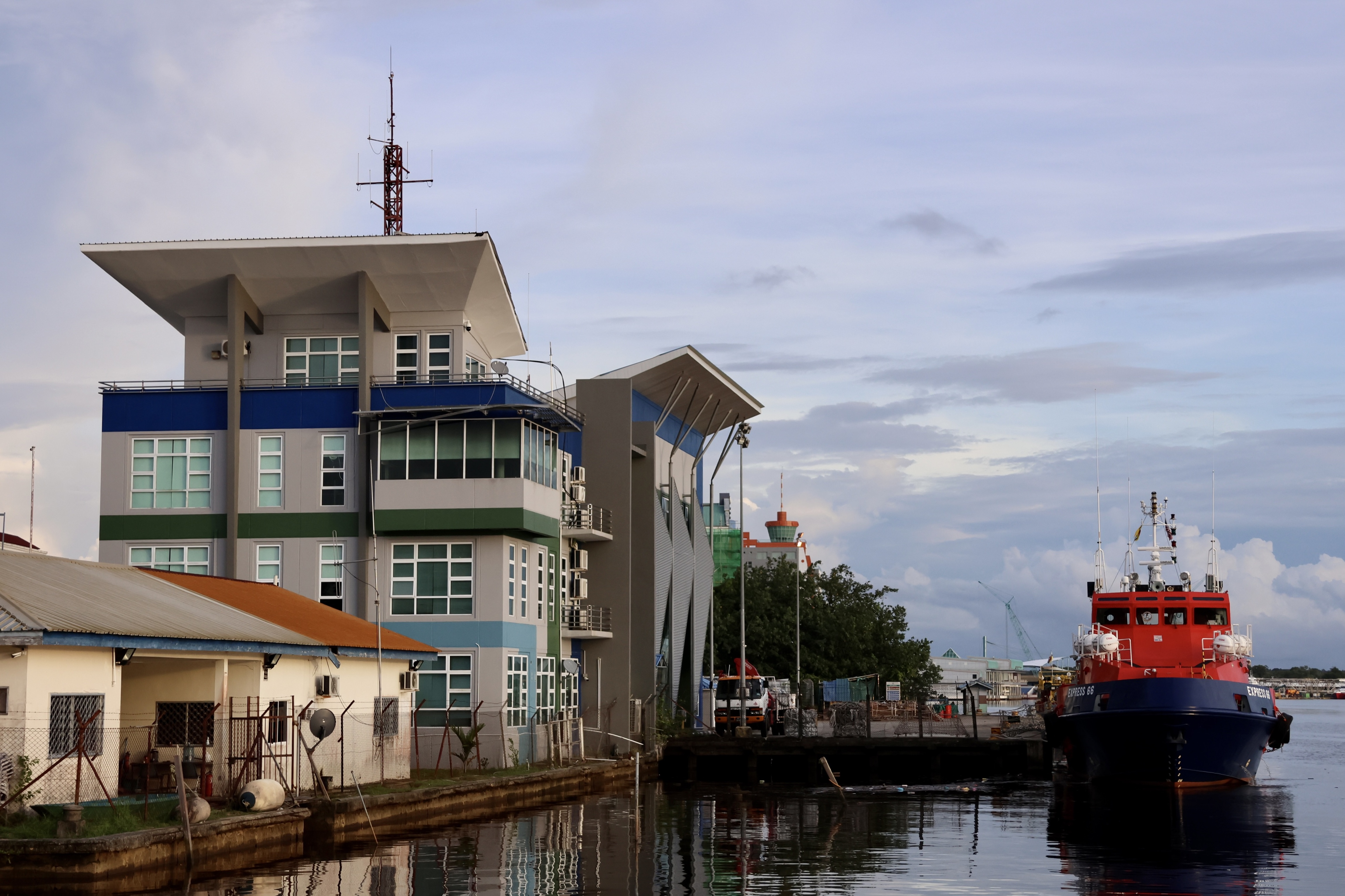
Commercial wharf of the Kuala Belait Port in 2022

Water transportation has historically been vital for Kuala Belait, particularly before the improvement of road infrastructure. Initially, communication with the capital was primarily by sea and via Labuan, as the Belait River was closed for six months each year due to the monsoon, which hindered trade. This reliance on water routes limited the movement of goods and people until road access improved. The BMPC contributed significantly to the development of water transport facilities by establishing wharves to facilitate the movement of materials and personnel to and from the oilfields. Despite these advancements, the oilfield community in Brunei often had closer contact with the oilfield community in Sarawak, where oil was piped for refining, highlighting the ongoing importance of water transportation in the region.

Water transportation in Kuala Belait is facilitated by a public wharf near the market, where visitors can hire water taxis to travel upriver towards Kuala Balai. Additionally, the Kuala Belait Boat Club organizses trips for sailing out to the open sea and visiting various nearby destinations. Historically, a timber jetty existed in Rasau as early as 1930. The Kuala Belait Port, one of Brunei's three ports, has sections near the river mouth operated by Brunei Shell, restricting public access. The commercial port is situated further upriver in Kampong Sungai Duhon and surrounding areas. However, due to silting at the river mouth, the port can only accommodate shallow draft vessels. To combat this issue, two breakwaters have been constructed at the mouth of the Belait River to help reduce silting.

== Infrastructure ==
The town is home to the Kuala Belait Library, consulate of Mexico and St. John's Church.

=== Education ===
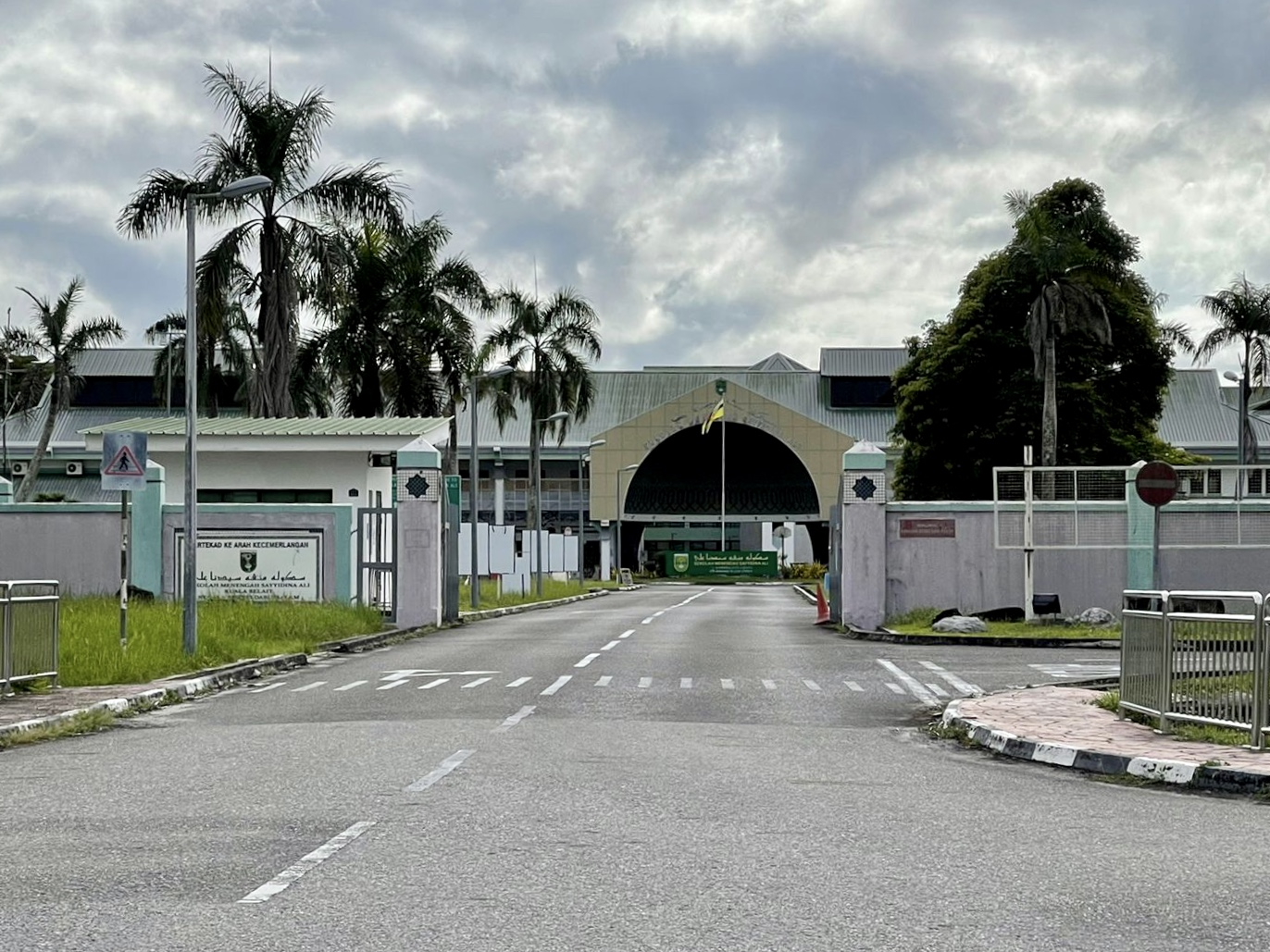
Sayyidina Ali Secondary School

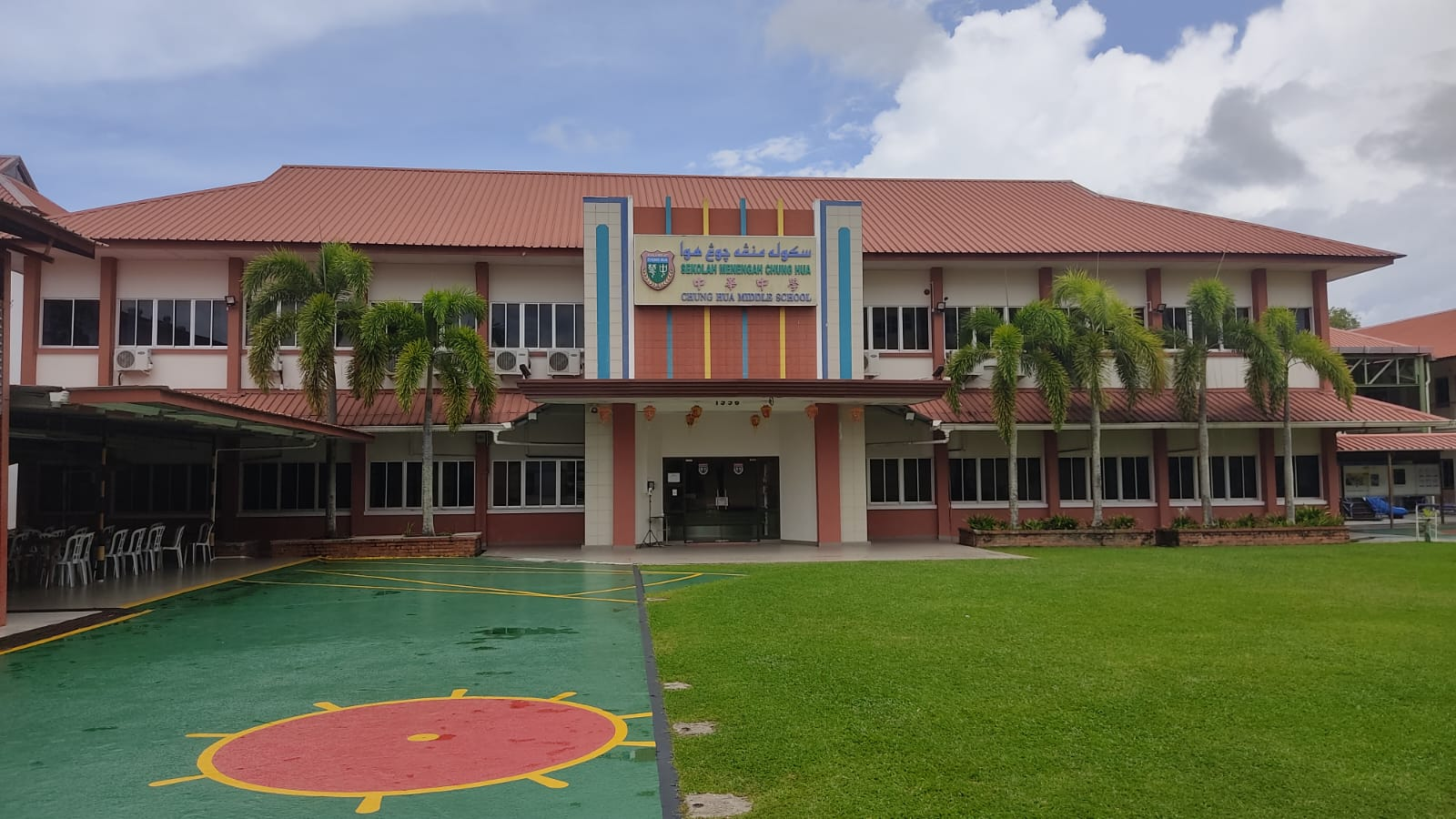
Chung Hua Middle School

Primary education in Kuala Belait is provided by various government and private schools, with three government primary schools currently in operation. For secondary education, the government has established three schools: Perdana Wazir Secondary School, Pengiran Jaya Negara Pengiran Haji Abu Bakar Secondary School, (Note: SMPJNPHAB is located approximately 5.6 kilometers from Kuala Belait. It was opened on 9 March 1987 on a 28.18 acres (11.40 ha) government-owned land. Initially known as Mumong Secondary School, it was renamed on 22 August 1998 to Pengiran Jaya Negara Pengiran Haji Abu Bakar Secondary School (SMPJNPHAB) in honour of Pengiran Abu Bakar, the first district officer of Belait, and was officially opened by Pengiran Anak Abdul Aziz. The school offers general secondary education from Year 7 to Year 11, culminating in the Sijil Am Pelajaran Peringkat Biasa academic qualification. In 1995, SMPJNPHAB introduced a boarding facility for students from remote areas within the Belait District and was designated as a "Special Science School," enrolling high-achieving students with five 'A's from the Primary School Assessment Examination of the Tutong and Belait districts. On 1 May 2003, the school also began offering afternoon religious education for its enrolled students.) and Sayyidina Ali Secondary School. In addition, there are four private schools in the area, offering primary, secondary, or both levels of education, with Chung Hua Middle School being the most notable among them.

Secondary students who choose sixth form education study at Belait Sixth Form Centre. Alternatively, students pursuing vocational education can attend one of two post-secondary institutions: the IBTE Jefri Bolkiah Campus, a government institution offering technical and vocational qualifications, and Kemuda Institute, a private college that provides foundation, diploma, and advanced diploma courses.

=== Places of interest ===
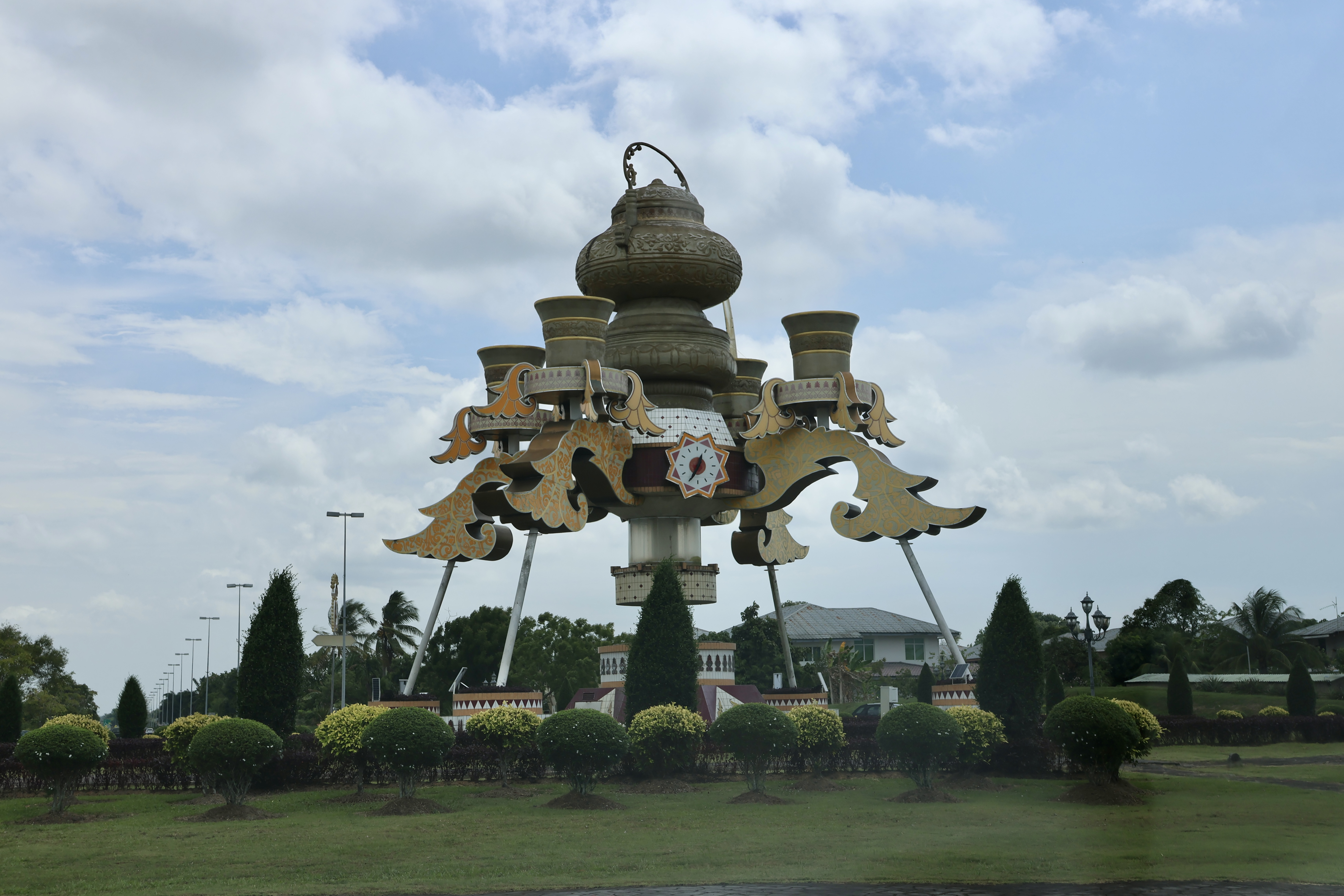
Tea Pot Roundabout

Kuala Belait town boasts several landmarks, including the Belait District Museum, Istana Kota Manggalela, and Belait Beach. Other notable sites include:

- Silver Jubilee Park is a park built to commemorate the Silver Jubilee of Sultan Hassanal Bolkiah’s accession to the throne, as a gift from the people of Kuala Belait.
- The Memorial Landmark Monument (Menara Cendera Kenangan) was built around 1996, located along the banks of the Belait River, near the entrance to the Kuala Belait Boat Club and Jalan Sungai. Made of concrete, tiles, and glass, this monument was constructed to commemorate the 50th birthday celebration of Sultan Hassanal Bolkiah on 15 July 1996.
- The Tugu Replika Sumbangsih Ciri or Tea Pot Roundabout in Kampong Pandan was built around 2001 and is located at the roundabout on Jalan Singa Menteri and Jalan Pandan Lima. Constructed entirely of concrete, it serves as one of the landmarks in Kuala Belait, a gift from Brunei Shell Petroleum (BSP) to Sultan Hassanal Bolkiah in honour of the Visit Brunei Year 2001. Standing at a height of 58 feet (18 m), the monument features a teapot at the top, with four large cups on either side, each symbolising the hospitality, warmth, and respect the people of Brunei show to visitors.
- The Clock Tower and Water Fountain Monument (Tugu Menara Jam dan Pancutan Air) was built around 1968, located at the roundabout on Jalan McKerron and Jalan Bunga Raya. Made entirely of concrete, this monument was constructed to commemorate the coronation of Sultan Hassanal Bolkiah. The monument reaches a height of approximately 40 feet and is adorned with four Seiko clocks, one at each corner.
- Kampong Pandan Mosque is a mosque in Kampong Pandan, built in 1994.
- Mohammad Jamalul Alam Mosque is a mosque in Kampong Melayu, built in 1961.

== Notable people ==
- Yusoff Abdul Hamid (born 1949), politician and diplomat
- Maizurah Abdul Rahim (born 1999), sprinter
- Abu Sufian Ali (born 1966), diplomat
- Salleh Bostaman, businessman and politician
- Johnie Everett (born 1964), Scottish cricketer
- Abdul Hariz Herman (born 2000), national footballer
- Hong Kok Tin (1910–1989), businessman and aristocrat
- Adinin Ibrahim (1932–2023), businessman
- Jefri Syafiq Ishak (born 2002), national footballer
- Princess Jaga (died 1967), daughter of Sultan Hashim Jalilul Alam Aqamaddin
- Christina Koning, novelist and writer
- Tiger Lim (born 1974), blogger and YouTube comedian
- Ng Teck Hock (1928–2008), aristocrat
- Suyoi Osman (born 1952), civil servant and politician
- Adina Othman (born 1955), civil servant and politician
- Zulkhairy Razali (born 1996), national footballer
- Abdul Rahman Taib (born 1942), civil servant and politician

== Gallery ==
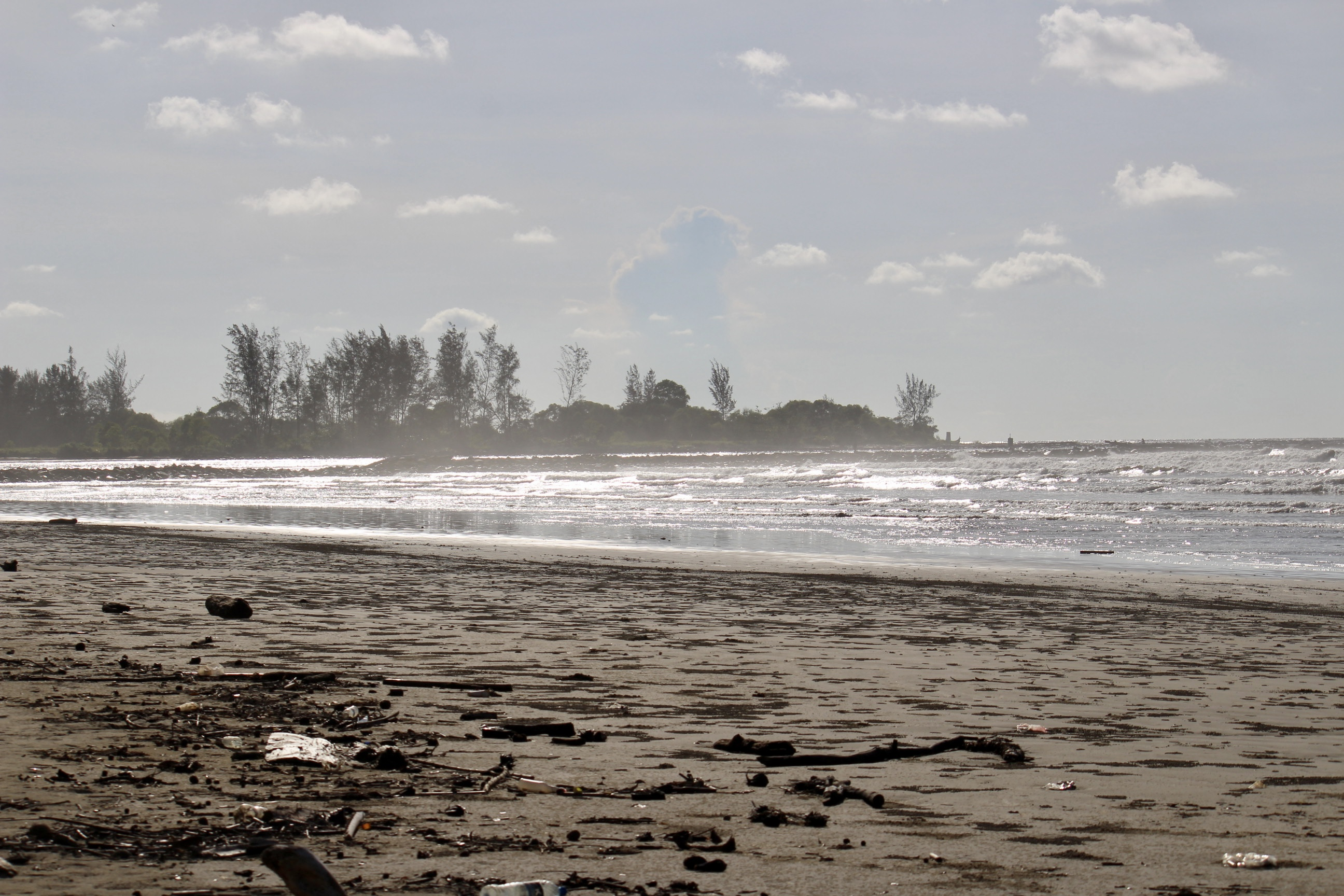
Belait Beach

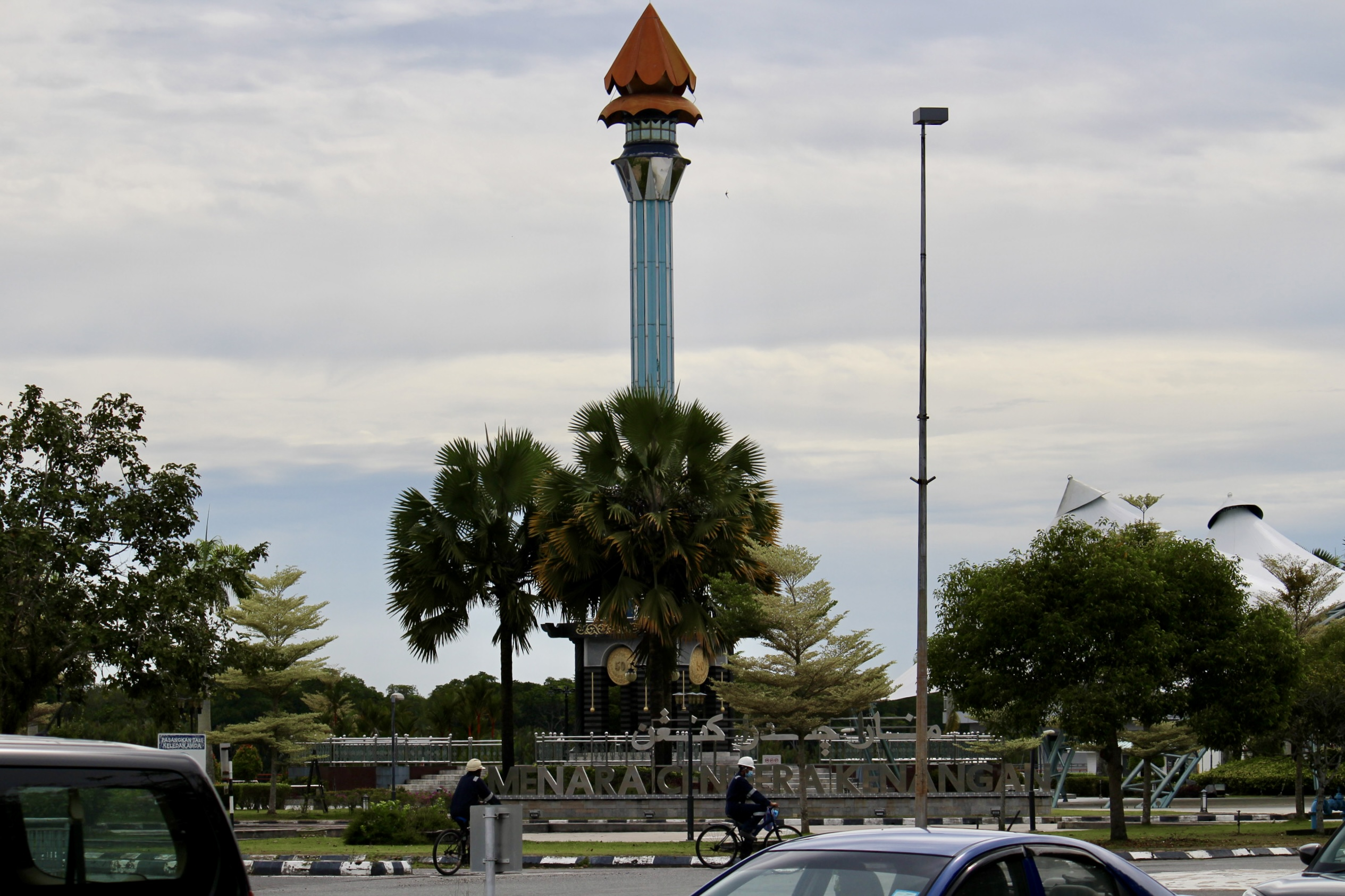
Menara Cendera Kenangan

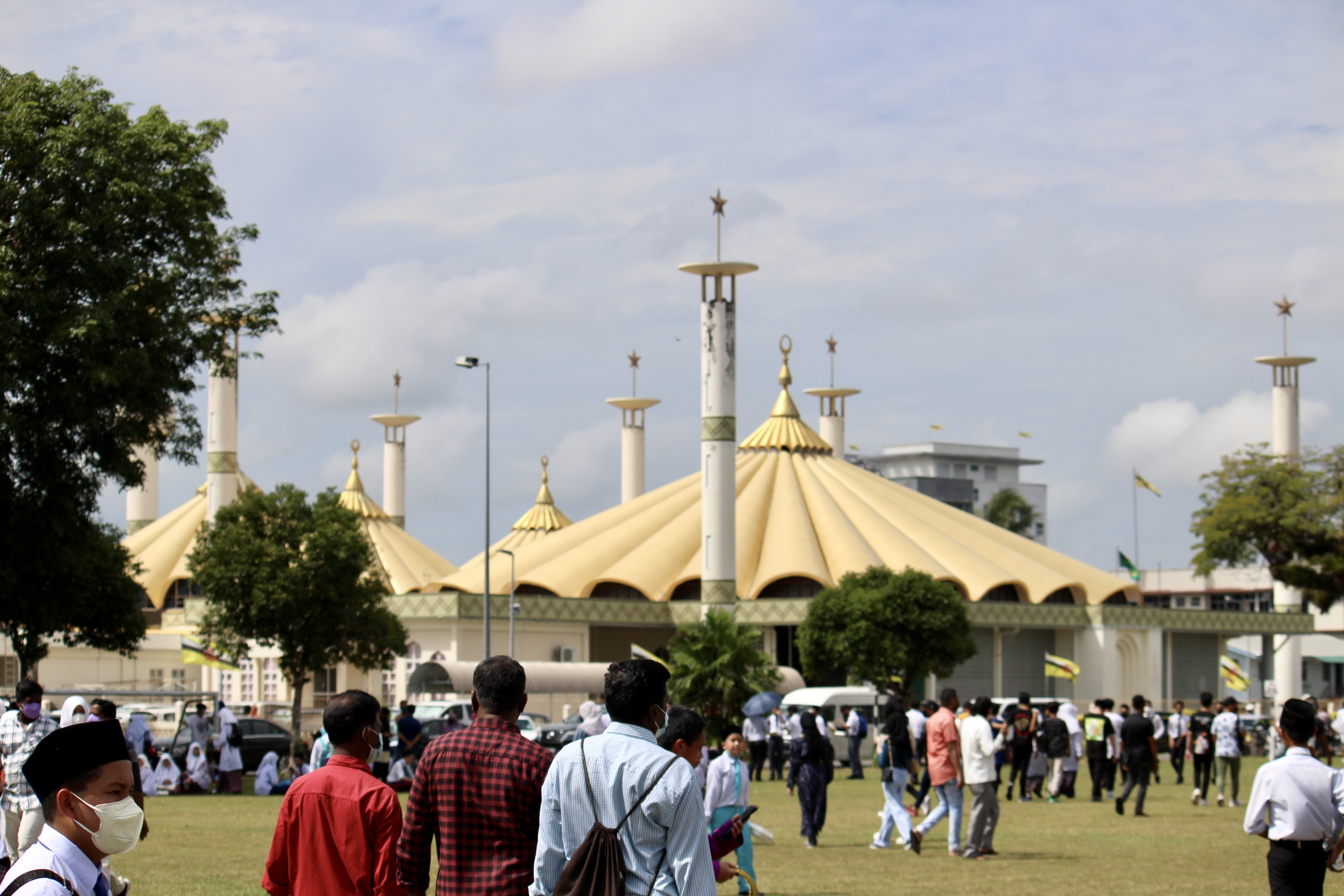
Mohammad Jamalul Alam Mosque

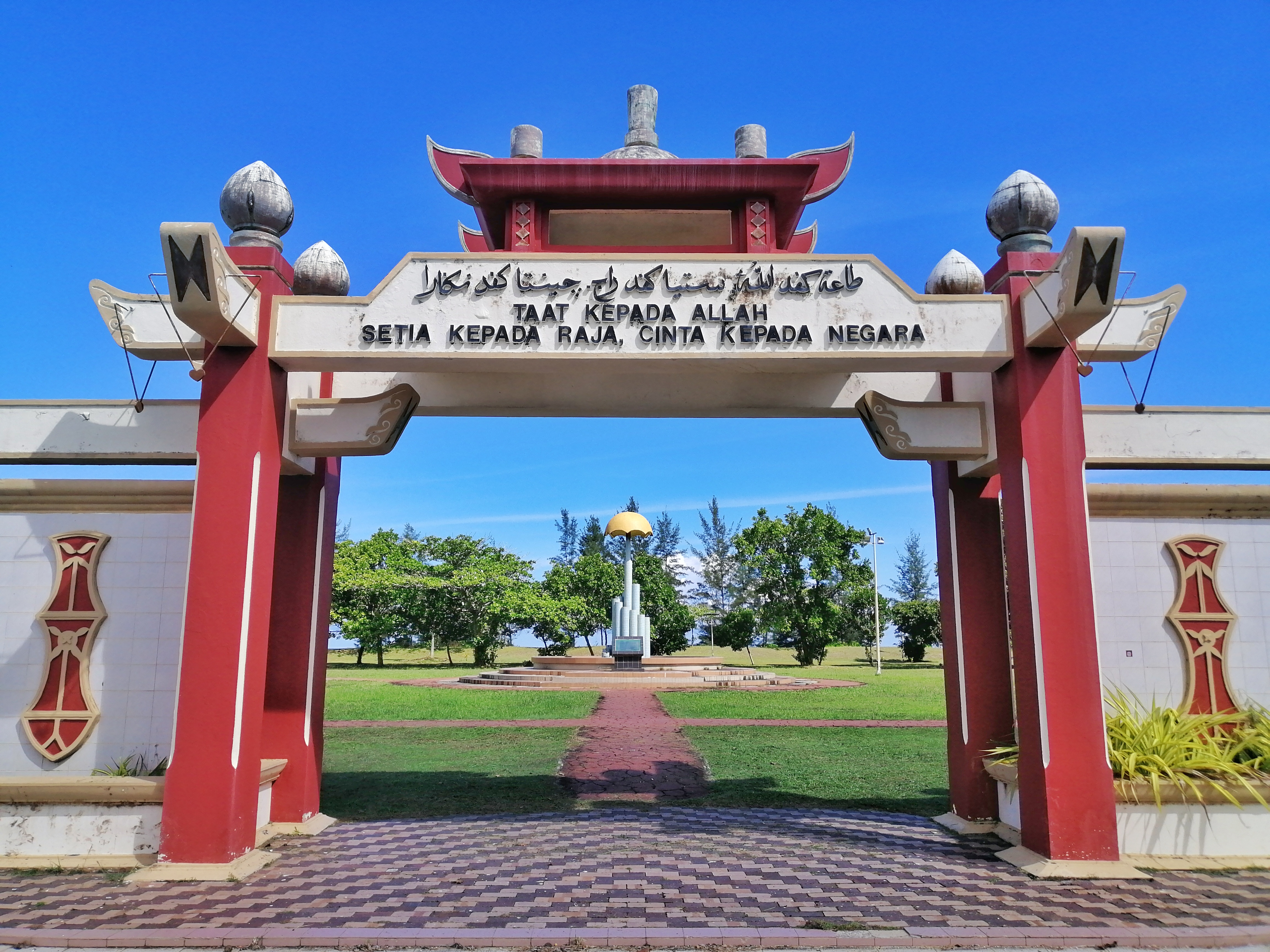
Silver Jubilee Park

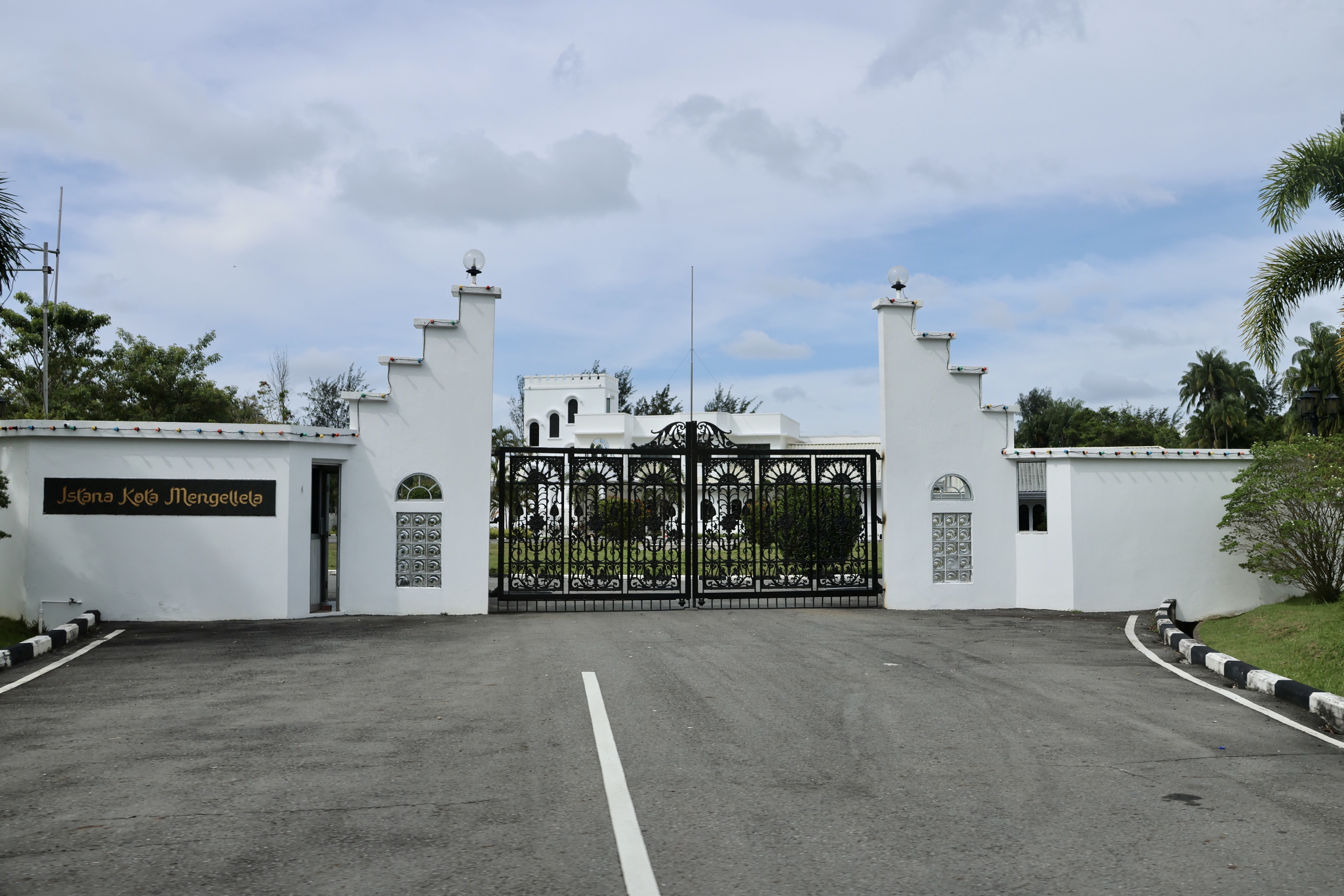
Istana Kota Manggalela

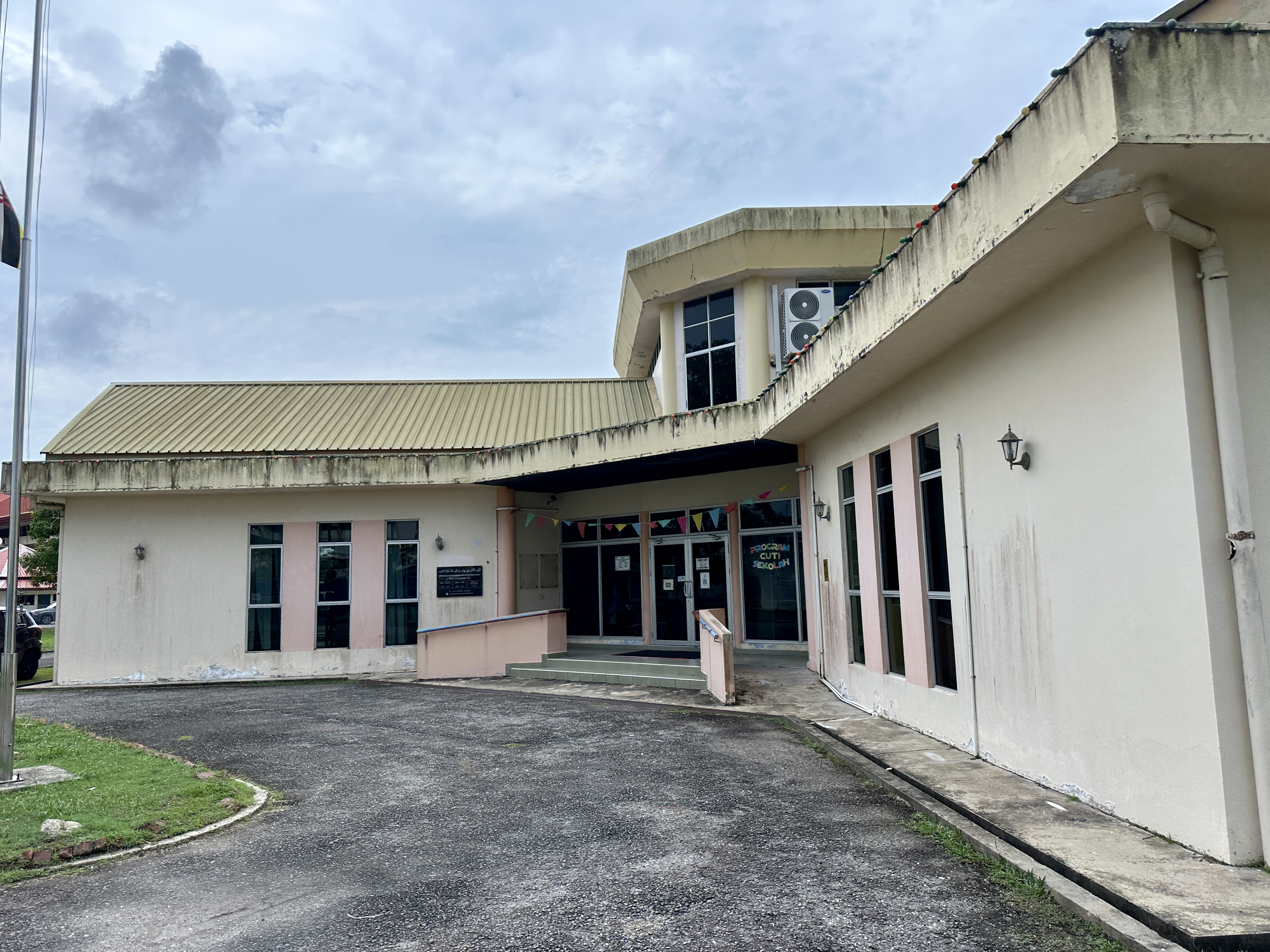
Kuala Belait Library

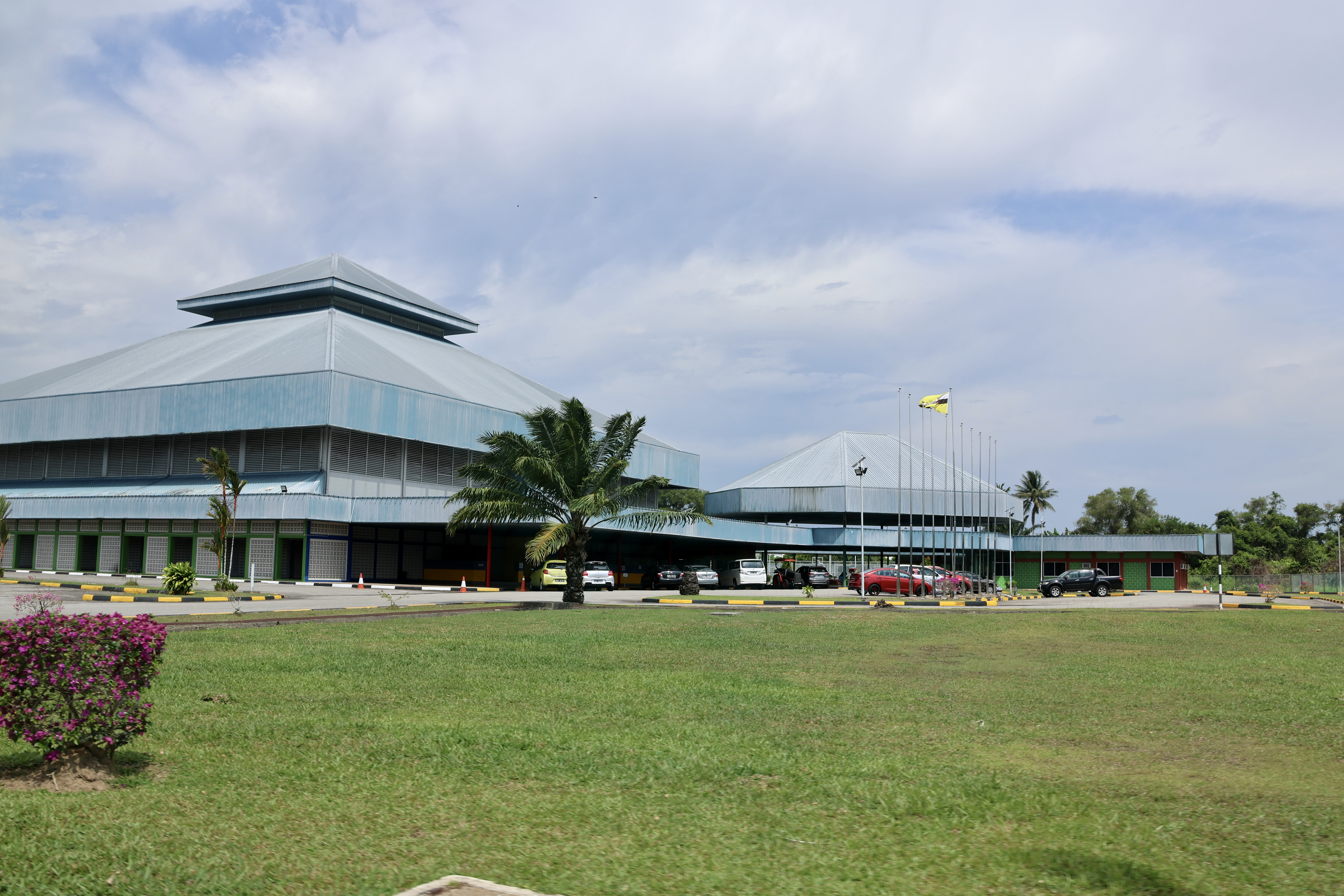
Mumong Sports Complex

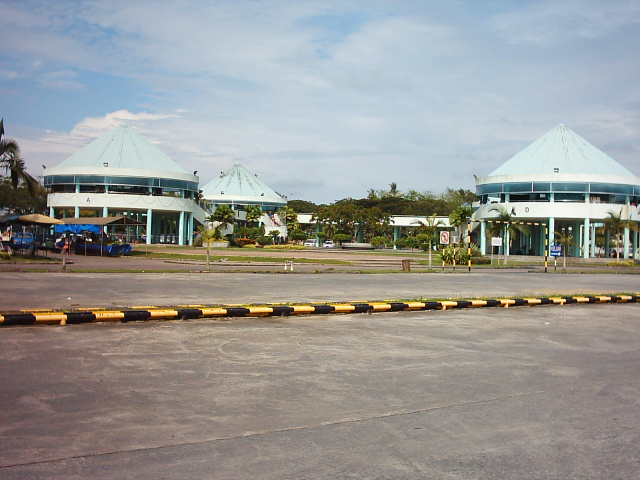
Tudung Saji

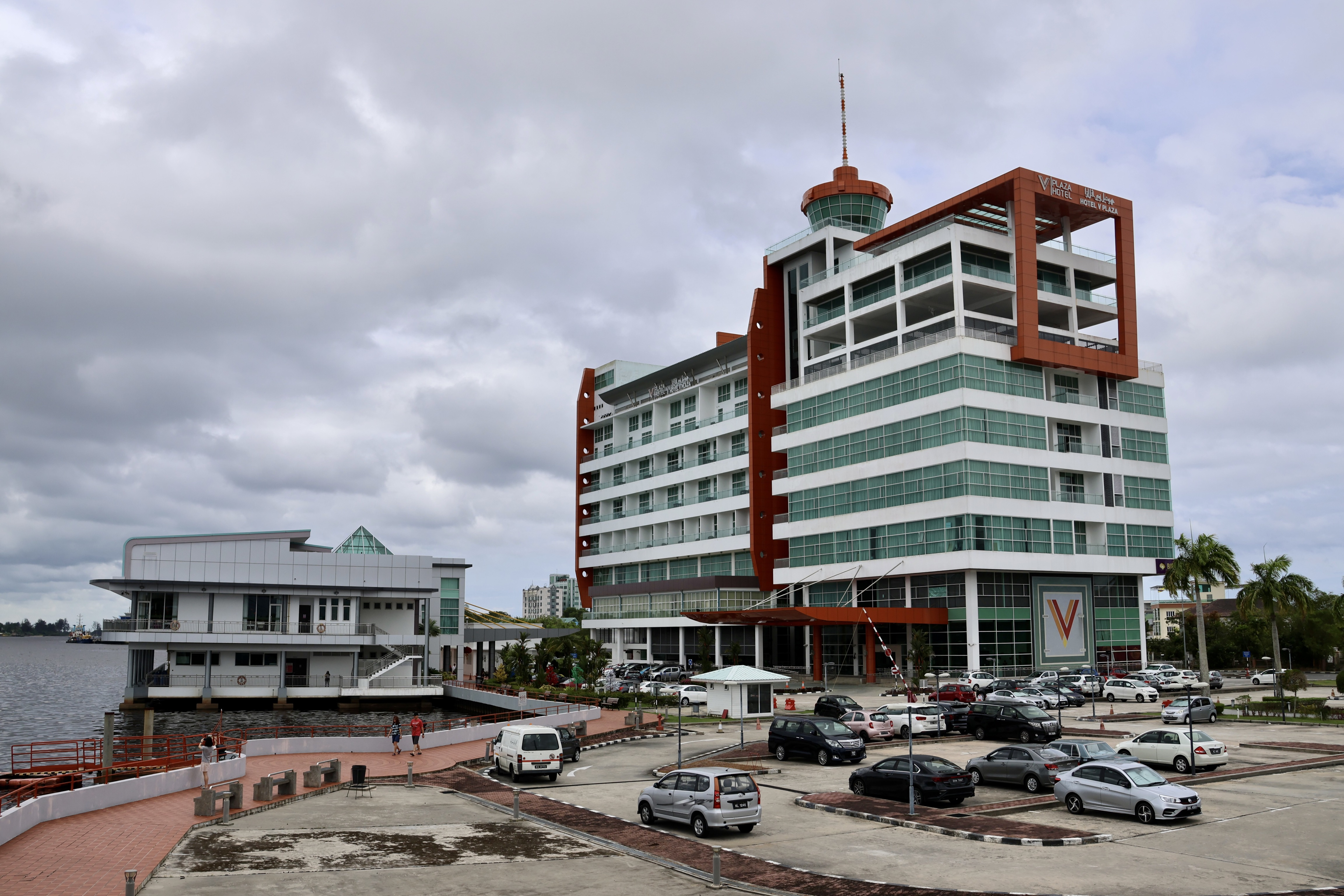
V Plaza Hotel

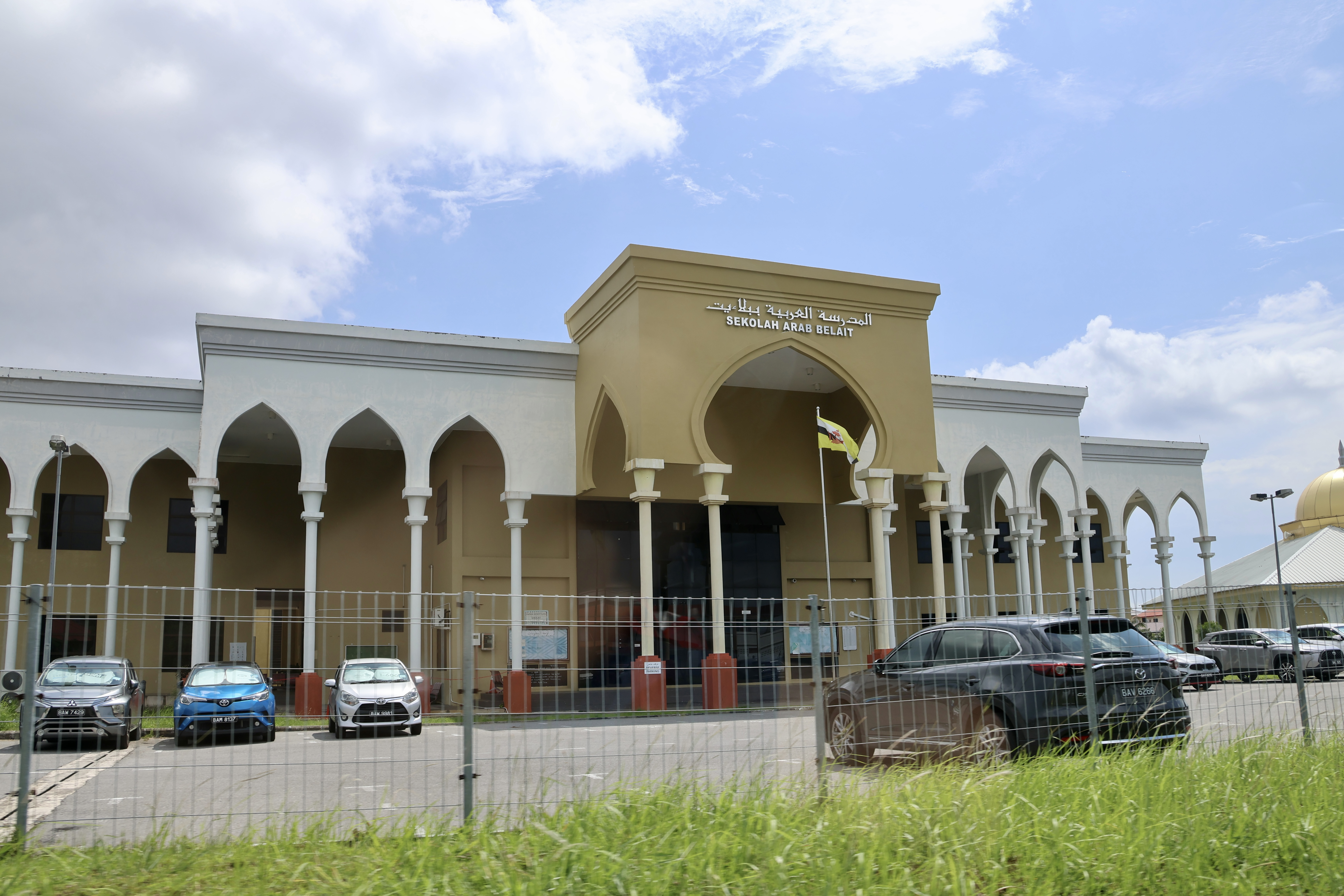
Belait Arabic School

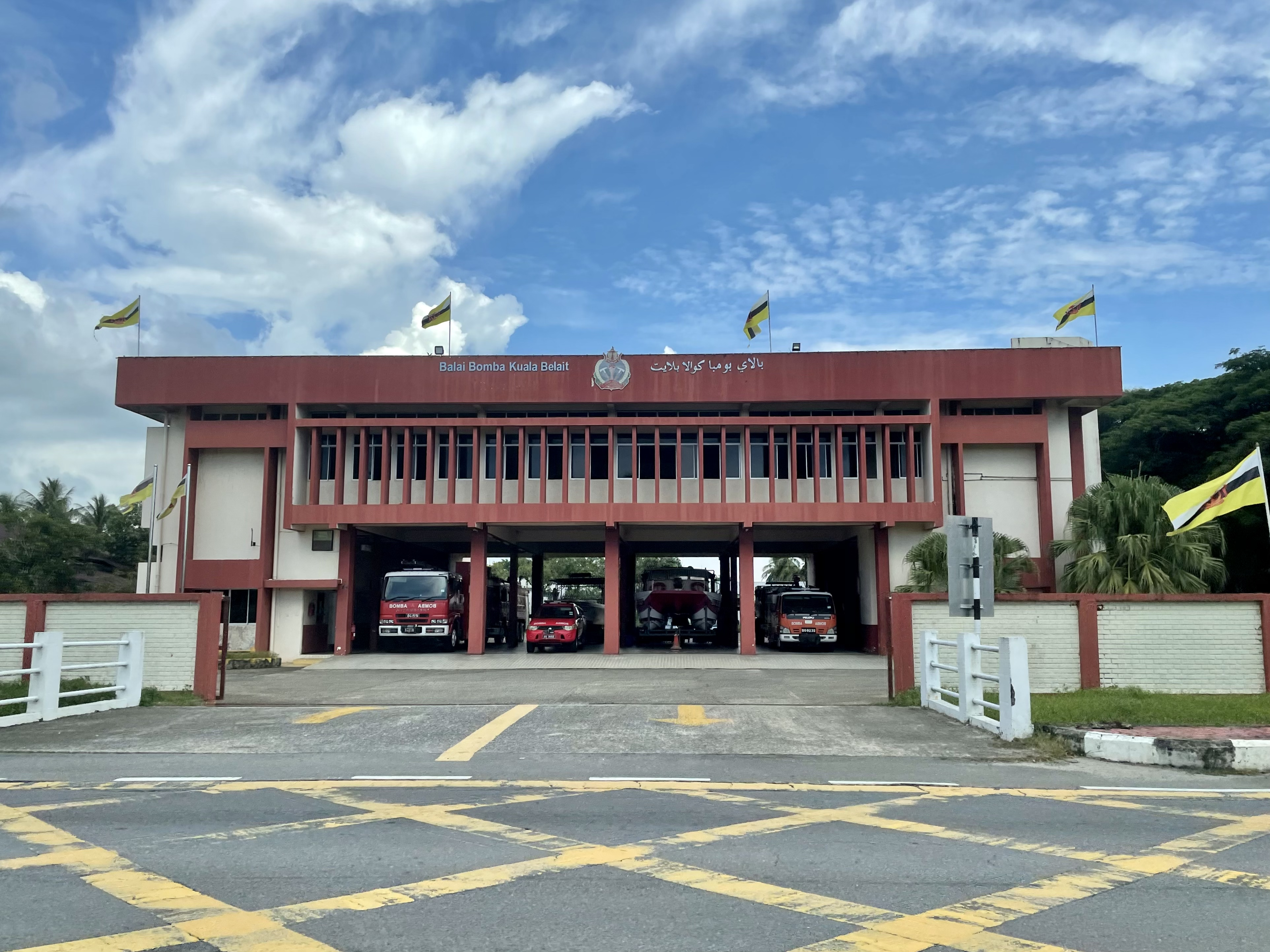
Kuala Belait Fire Station

== Sister cities/towns ==
- Surabaya, East Java, Indonesia
