= Tiger Lim =

Lim Han Hu
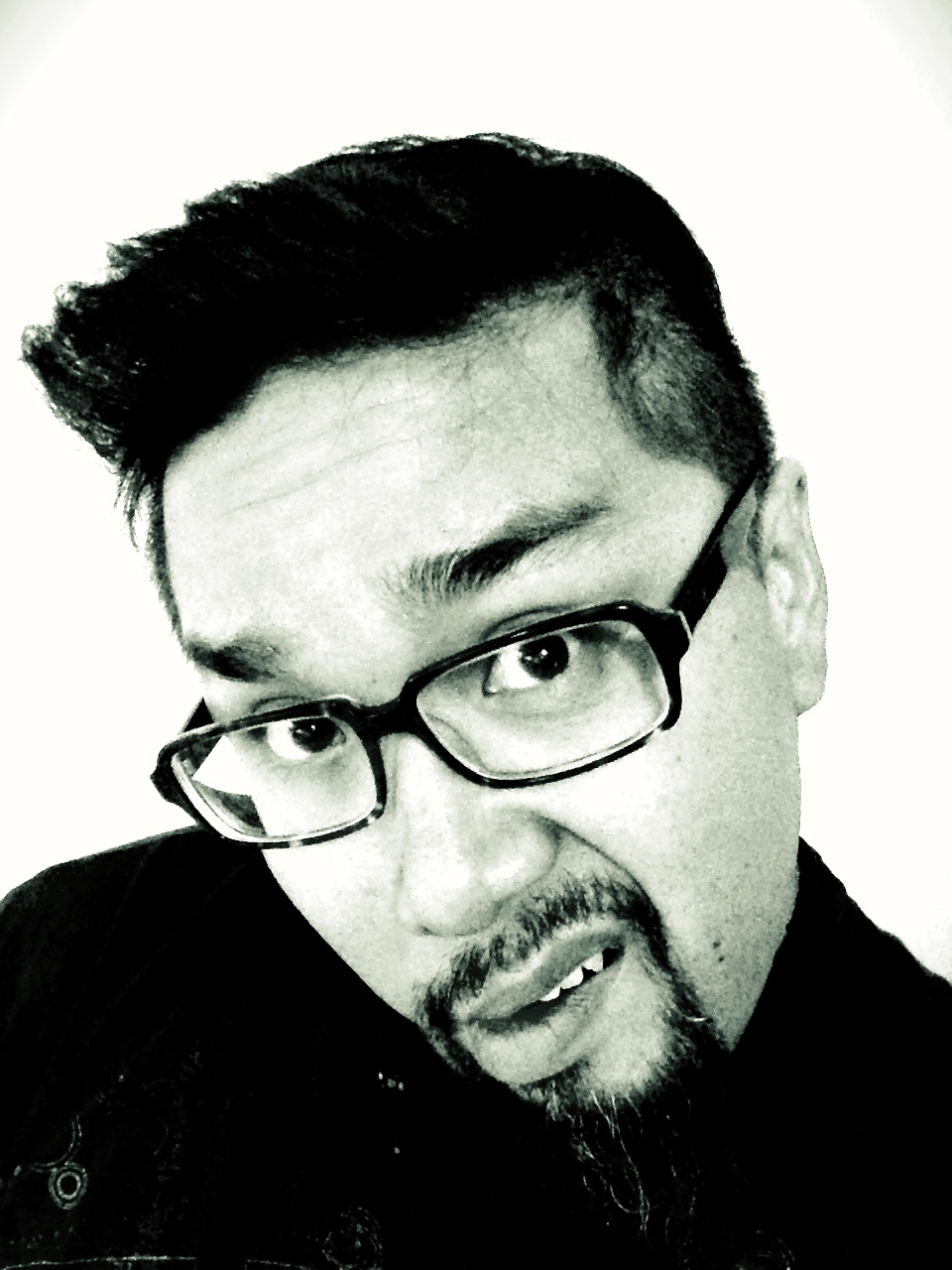
- Born: Lim Han Hu; 5 September 1974 (age 52); Kuala Belait, Belait, Brunei
- Other name: Tiger Lim
- Notable work: Auntie Driver Parking Fail (original)

Comedy career
- Years active: 2007-present
- Genre: Failblog
- Website: http://tigerlim.com

Tiger Lim (born 5 September 1974) or officially Lim Han Hu, is Brunei's self-proclaimed No. 1 broken-English blogger and a YouTube comedian who shares his videos under the username tigerlim7673. He is also a freelance sound engineer whose blog garners an average of 2,000 viewers daily.

Tiger Lim derived his nickname from his year of birth, the Year of the Tiger. His video entitled Auntie Driver Parking Fail (original) was one of his first narrated videos, which subsequently received 10 different translations. As comedic as he is, Tiger Lim has also sparked controversy when he posted a bully video on his personal blog. The YouTube Chinese comedian has been interview by The Brunei Times, citing that he "talks about English, seriously."

== tigerlim7673 channel ==
The first video posted on tigerlim7673 was "japan tv show", on May 8, 2007. Tiger Lim started posting videos of himself narrating in a comedy style since 6 July 2009. His first narrated comedy video was Auntie Driver Parking Fail (original), where he pokes fun at a lady's attempt at reversing into a parking space behind Ripas hospital. The video has spread to different countries as far as Taiwan and Australia with more than 10 different versions uploaded by other YouTube users.

He also recreated a subtitled version of Zek's minta maaf (my apology) video, a YouTube video of a young man named Zek from Brunei pleading forgiveness to his girlfriend. Tiger re-edited the video and shortened it to 6 minutes, adding an English translation since many of the lines were delivered in Bahasa Melayu (Malay Language).

== Controversies ==
Tiger Lim stirred up a controversial story about a controversial video that he has posted on his popular blog. The video was about a student bullying other students in a toilet. His chat box was then flooded with comments from public, mostly with mixed feelings. Tiger has his reasons for posting the video but came at a huge risk. The boy, RJ, was expelled. However, the management said that it was not based on the video or evidence (posted by Tiger Lim) but based on his poor disciplinary record in CHMS.

In February 2011, David Deterding, an Associate Professor at University Brunei Darussalam questioned and raised some linguistic questions after reading some entries posted on his blog. He claimed that Tiger's use of informal, non-standard English was deliberate and he wonders how natural it was.

Tiger Lim has stirred quite a number controversies in his own social media page, in November 2013 during his visit to Philippine, he took a picture of himself with number of Filipinos in the back and posted in Instagram that he'll be bringing Filipinos maid back. Hence stereotyping majority Filipinos as maid. As a result, a boycott page has been set up targeted Tiger Lim. Tiger Lim also being continuously hit by public on some of his insensitive post.

== YouTube Videos ==
#	Video Title	Uniform Resource Locator (URL)	Release date
1	"Crazy Man In Brunei!!!"	https://www.youtube.com/watch?v=vHf1UCJe3Oo	June 27, 2009
2	"Brunei 1st Yamaha Bikes Day"	https://www.youtube.com/watch?v=p8OJT6Y8Ews	July 7, 2009
3	"Brunei Fast And Furious Bus Driver"	https://www.youtube.com/watch?v=cA9A4LipGnA	August 7, 2009
4	~ You Are So Beautiful~	"https://www.youtube.com/watch?v=YoAQsKrrsmk"	September 12, 2009
5	"Mosquito Bite My Baby!!!"	https://www.youtube.com/watch?v=F_0GQY3qXOg	September 19, 2009
6	"JAM JAM JAM JAMMMMM.m4v"	https://www.youtube.com/watch?v=4hnA8MhWTWI	January 20, 2010
7	"Balls.m4v"	https://www.youtube.com/watch?v=r4gL45uw0ZQ	February 2, 2010
8	"DarKie To Darlie.m4v"	https://www.youtube.com/watch?v=WNKZGrBnYI8	February 8, 2010
