= Kampong Sungai Duhon =

Village in Brunei

Sungai Duhon
- Village
- Kampong Sungai Duhon
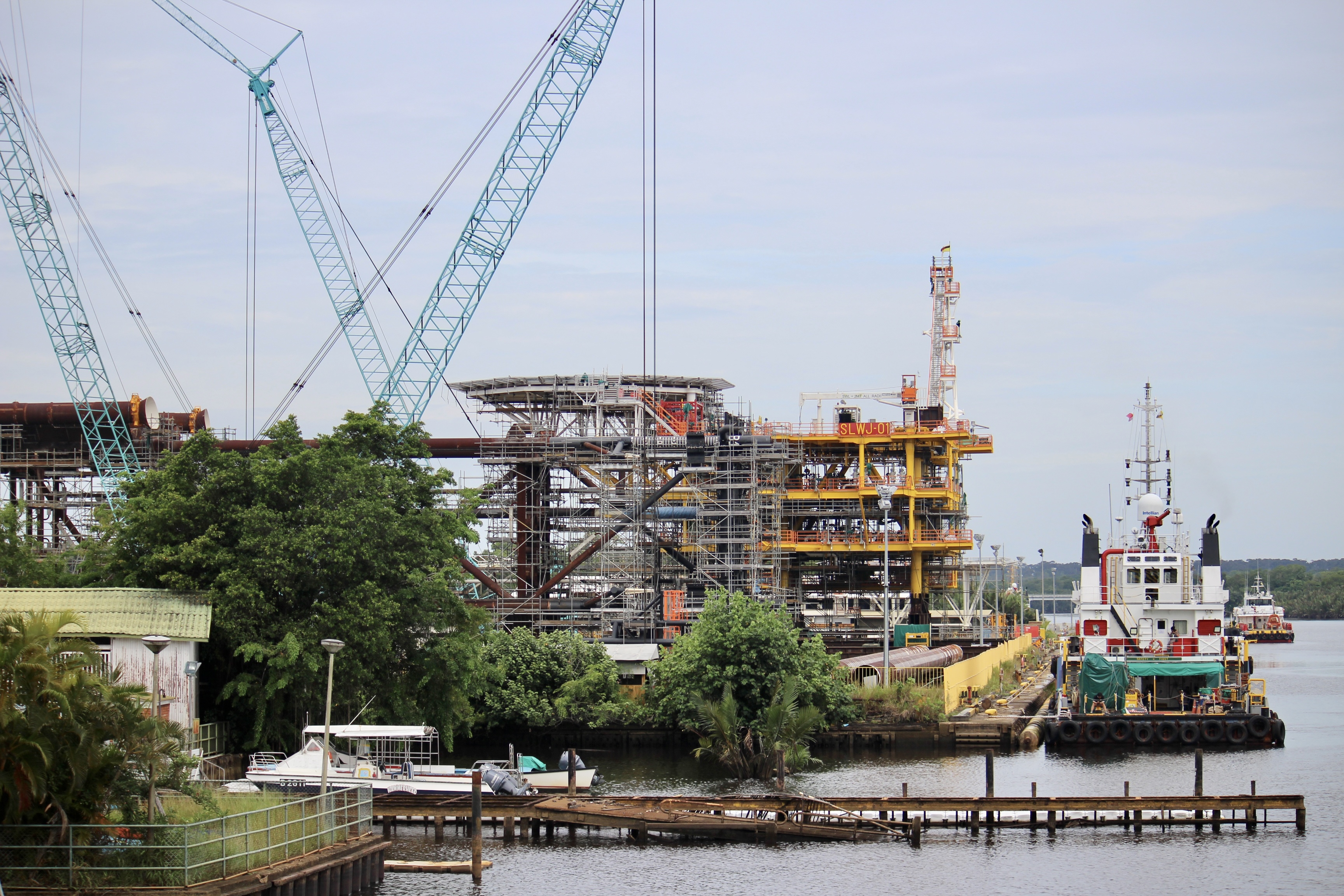
- Marine Construction Yard

- Location in Brunei
- Coordinates: 4°34′21″N 114°12′16″E
- Country: Brunei
- District: Belait
- Mukim: Kuala Belait
- Time zone: UTC+8 (BNT)
- Postcode: KA3131

Kampong Sungai Duhon is a village that is located within the town of Kuala Belait in Mukim Kuala Belait, Belait District of Brunei. The postcode is KA3131.

== History ==
In 1975, plans were made to relocate the settlers of Sungai Duhon away from the village.

Planning of the 107.25 hectares (265.0 acres) Sungai Duhon Industrial Park was made as of 2018.

== Industries ==
The Sungai Duhon Industrial Park is an industrial park south of the town in which it provide light industries.

The Marine Construction Yard (MCY) designed and produced oil platforms.

== Transportation ==
The Kuala Belait Port is one of the two ports of Brunei.

There are no airports in Kuala Belait. Commercial travellers would have to use the Brunei International Airport in Bandar Seri Begawan, Anduki Airfield in Seria or Miri to catch a commercial flight.

== Education ==
The Paduka Seri Begawan Sultan Omar Ali Saifuddien Religious School located on Jalan Singa Menteri in between the Marine Construction Yard and the Public Works Department (JKR) Kuala Belait office.
