= Istana Kota Manggalela =

Palace in Brunei

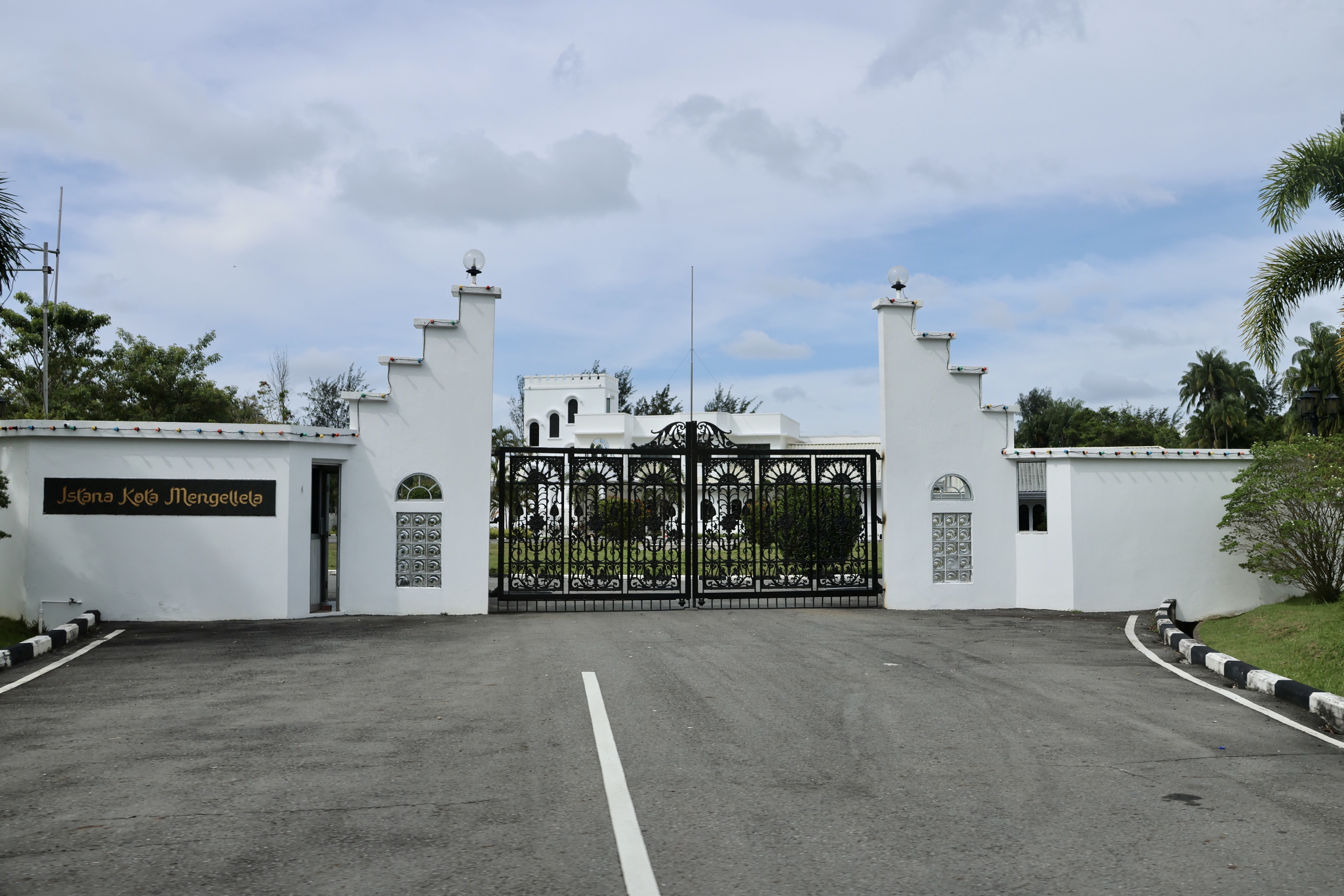
- Istana Kota Manggalela in 2023
- Interactive map of the Istana Kota Manggalela area
- Former names: Istana Hinggap
- Alternative names: Istana Manggalela

General information
- Type: Residence
- Architectural style: Colonial
- Location: Jalan Maulana, Kuala Belait, Belait, Brunei
- Coordinates: 4.5969832°N 114.2517270°E
- Construction started: 1956; 70 years ago
- Completed: 1958; 68 years ago

Technical details
- Material: concrete and cement

The Istana Kota Manggalela (English: Kota Manggalela Palace), also known as Istana Manggalela, was one of the temporary official residences of the then Sultan of Brunei, Omar Ali Saifuddien III. The palace is located at Jalan Maulana, Kuala Belait, Belait District, Brunei. The building has become a tourist attraction and historical site in the present day.

== Design and construction ==
The name "Istana Kota Manggalela" is taken from a battle during the Padas Damit War which took place around Manggalela Fort, Beaufort, Sabah between the British North Borneo Company (BNBC) forces and the Bruneian Sultanate residents from December 1888 until May 1889. Istana Hinggap is the former name of the palace, in which the Malay word "Hinggap" translates to "Temporarily" in English. The palace itself is completely built from concrete and cement.

== History ==
Istana Hinggap was built in 1956 and later completed two years later. It was ordered and built by Sultan Omar Ali Saifuddien III as a temporary residence whenever he visits the Belait District. From the 1960s and 70s, the palace functioned as a stopover point for British Army officers.

== See also ==
- Politics of Brunei
- Kuala Belait
- Istana Nurul Iman
