= Kuala Belait Port =

Commercial port in Kuala Belait, Belait District, Brunei

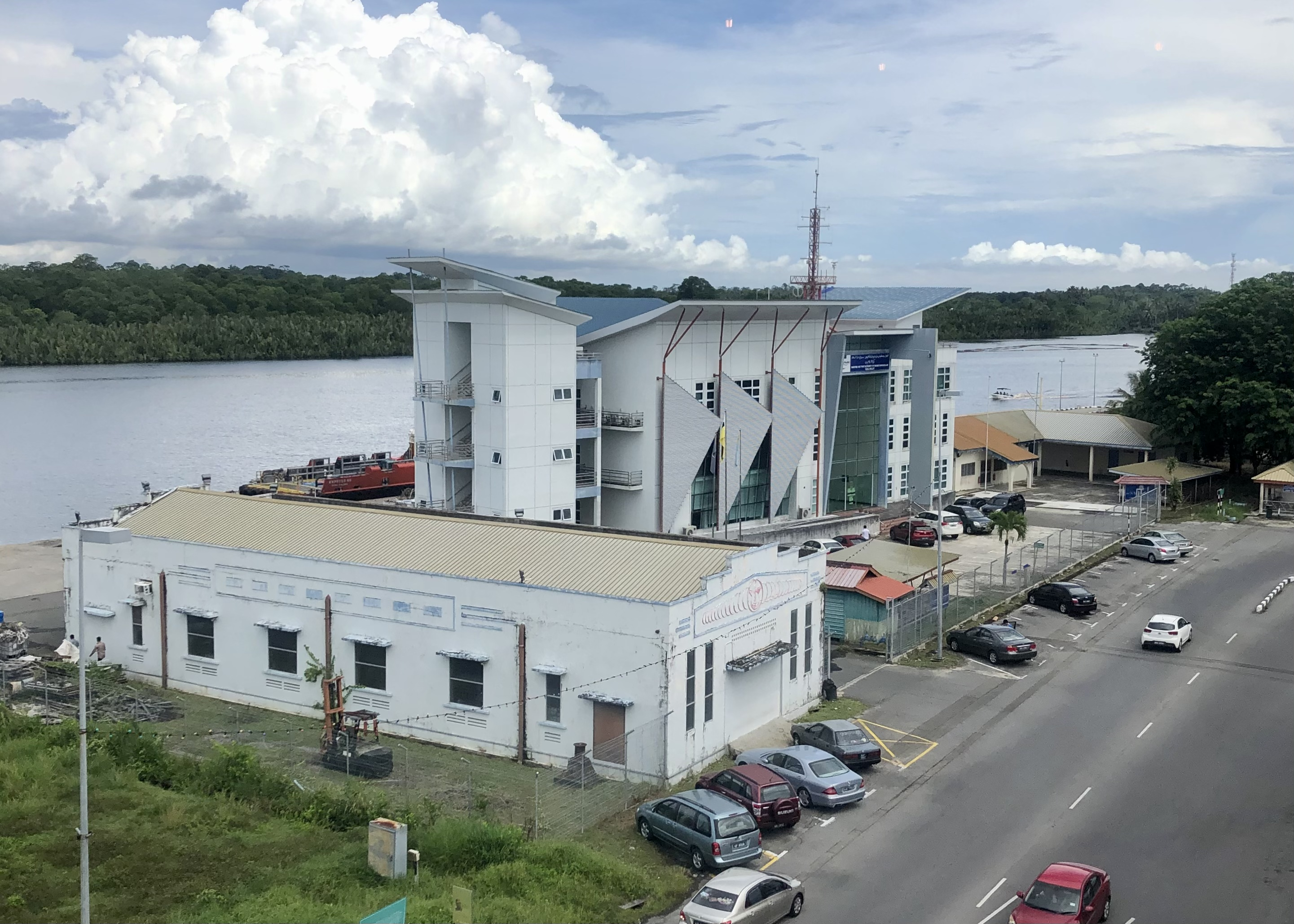
- Kuala Belait Port in 2020
- Click on the map for a fullscreen view
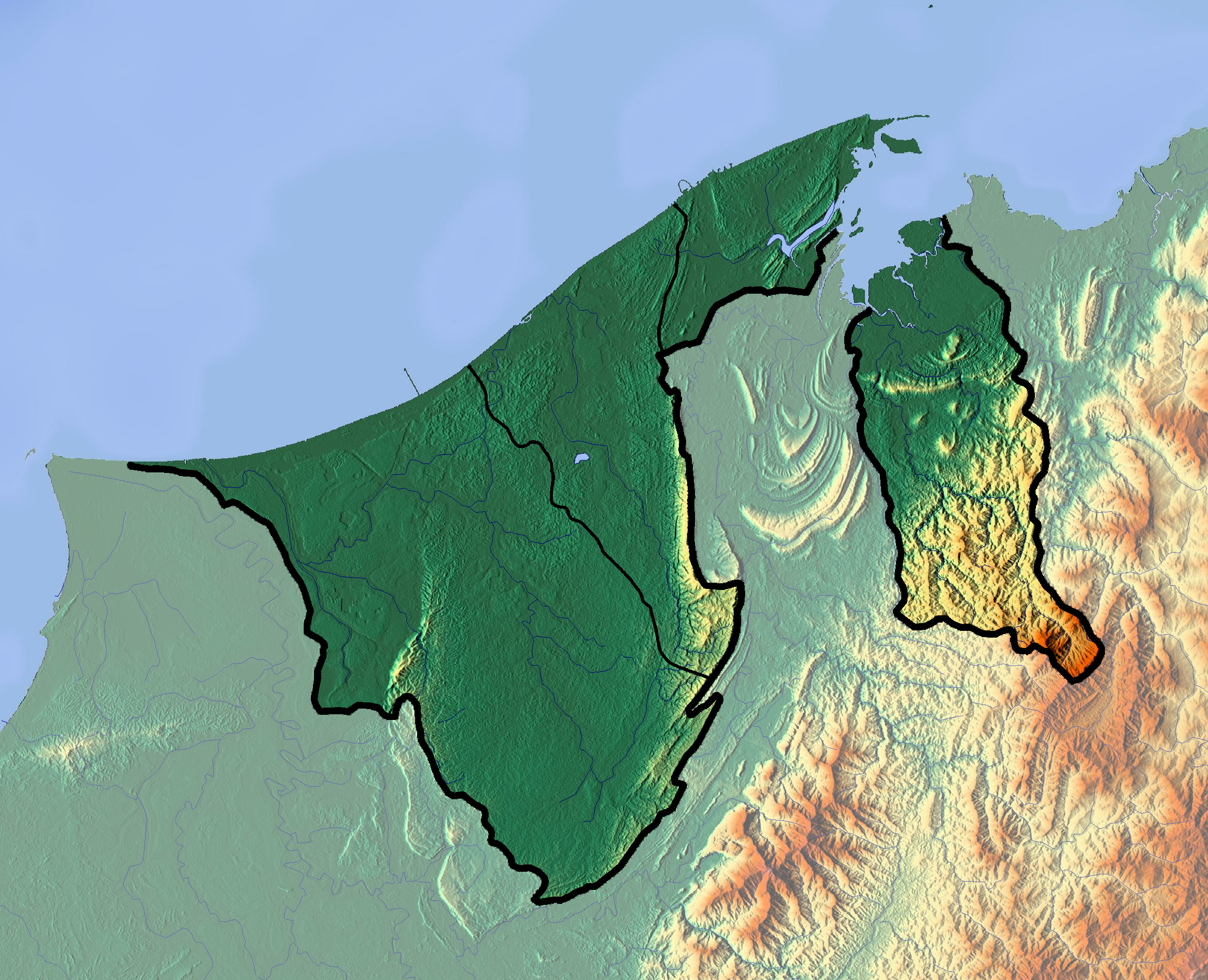
- Location in Brunei

Location
- Country: Brunei
- Location: Kuala Belait, Belait
- Coordinates: 4°34′55″N 114°11′26″E

Details
- Operated by: Maritime and Port Authority Brunei Darussalam
- Draft depth: 8 ft (2.4 m)

Statistics
- Website mpabd.gov.bn

The Kuala Belait Port (Malay: Pelabuhan Kuala Belait), also known as Kuala Belait Wharf, is a port operated by both the Brunei Shell Petroleum (BSP) and Maritime and Port Authority Brunei Darussalam (MPABD). The port can only accommodate low-draught ships. It is one of the only three existing ports in the country.

== Geography ==
The port sits at the east bank of the Belait River, opposite of Sungai Teraban and not far from the District's capital Kuala Belait. It has a shallow depth of 8 ft (2.4 m). Kuala Belait port is also one of the closest sea facility from Sarawak, Malaysia. It can also be noted that only Muara Port and Kuala Belait Port provided shipping to Hong Kong, Singapore and other parts of Asia. The location allowed ships to have full access to the South China Sea.

== History ==
The Royal Brunei Navy held an Open Ship & Career Exhibition at the port on 15 December 2007. On 30 September 2021, the MPABD building in the government wharf was lit up blue in conjunction to the World Maritime Day.

== Facilities ==
There are several designated areas and facilities within the two different sections of the port:

=== Brunei Shell Petroleum wharf ===
- A 90 ft (27 m) long pier
- Five 25 t (25 long tons; 28 short tons) cranes
- A 22 t (22 long tons; 24 short tons) derrick

=== Government wharf ===
- A 328 ft (100 m) long wharf
- A 5 t (4.9 long tons; 5.5 short tons) crane
- Warehouse and storage facilities
