= St John's Church, Kuala Belait =

Church in Kuala Belait, Brunei

St. John’s Church
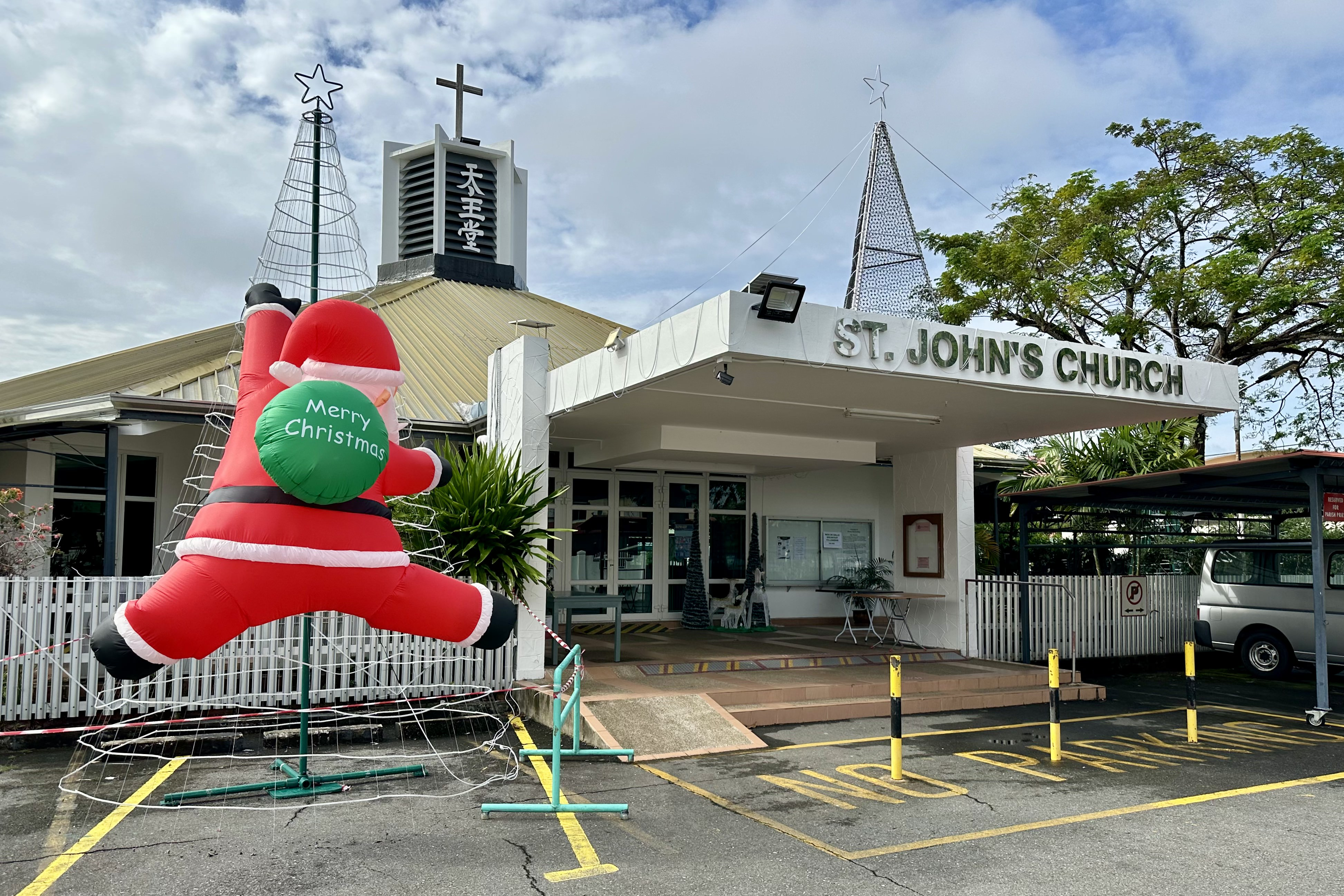
- The church in 2024

- Location within Brunei
- 4.5826875°N 114.1939375°E
- Address: No. 36, Jalan Bunga Raya, Kuala Belait, KA1189
- Country: Brunei
- Denomination: Roman Catholic
- Website: rcvbd.com

History
- Former name: Kuala Belait Roman Catholic Church
- Status: Active
- Founded: 1953
- Founder: Piet de Wit
- Dedication: John the Evangelist
- Dedicated: November 1954

Architecture
- Completed: 12 March 1972

Administration
- District: Belait District

Clergy
- Bishop: sede vacante
- Priest: Paul Shie

The St. John's Church is a Roman Catholic church of the Apostolic Vicariate of Brunei in the town of Kuala Belait, Belait District. It is one of three Roman Catholic churches in the nation; the other two being the Church of Our Lady of Immaculate Conception in Seria and the Pro-Cathedral of Our Lady of the Assumption in Bandar Seri Begawan.

== History ==
Fr. Crowther became the first resident priest when Kuala Belait was made a head station in 1936. In a leased home on Jalan Padang in Kuala Belait, Fr. Piet de Wit founded the first Catholic school the next year after being tasked with supporting Fr. Crowther. Additionally, Kuala Belait saw the establishment of the Roman Catholic Mission around this time. The location of the wooden church/school was situated between the current Chung Hua Middle School and the Foo Chow Association. The Kuala Belait Mission did not have a regular priest assigned to it at first, and priests from other missions would occasionally visit.

During the Japanese occupation of Brunei, the Japanese Army detained all foreign missionaries between 1941 and 1945 as part of World War II. Although the Japanese forces utilised the church and rectory, they left it in a state of decay. Many of the pious did their utmost to maintain the church. In 1945 and 1947, respectively, Fr. A. Crowther and Fr. Piet de Wit return to Brunei. Fr. de Witt established the Seria English School (St. Michael's School) through a partnership with the British Malayan Petroleum after being named rector for the Kuala Belait/Seria Mission. Fr. Crowther was appointed to oversee Brunei's mission schools.

Fr. McCarthy was named Rector of the Kuala Belait/Seria Mission in 1949. Fr. Gerard Rottinghuis was named principal of the Seria and Kuala Belait English Schools by 1950. Fr. Leo Barry became the new Rector of the Seria and Kuala Belait Missions in 1952. Fr. Herman Plattner formally opened the Kuala Belait Roman Catholic Church during Christmas 1953. Fr. John Maher began working as a teacher at the Seria English School in 1954. He also served as the Rector of the Seria Missions' assistant. Monseigneur Vos, the Vicar Apostolic of Kuching, designated Saint John the Evangelist as the patron saint of the St. John's Church in November 1954, and thus the Kuala Belait Roman Catholic Church was formally renamed St. John's. Fr. John Van de Laar was named principal and rector of St. John's Church and School by January 1957.

Fr. Van de Laar underwent eye surgery while on a six-month vacation in the Netherlands and returned to Kuala Belait in February 1968. After 38 years of service in Borneo, Fr. John Van de Laar left Brunei in November 1968, and Fr. Peter Chung—who was the Archbishop of Kuching—took over as St. John's rector. Fr. Michael Gill and Fr. H. Brentjens were sent to the Kuala Belait and Seria missions earlier in January and February 1967. Bishop Anthony Galvin blessed the location of the new St. John's Church in 1970 with the help of Fr. Peter Chung. The new church's construction started in 1971, and on 12 March 1972, Bishop Anthony Galvin dedicated and inaugurated it.

In 1980, the sacrament of confirmation was administered at St. John's by Fr. Tong and Bishop Anthony Lee. After finishing his study as a priest in the United States, Bro. Cornelius Sim was appointed to oversee St. John's Parish by 1988. On 31 May 1989, Bishop Anthony Lee consecrated him as a deacon at St. John's. The two priests who were still in Brunei at the end of February 1991 were Fr. Peter Chiang and Fr. John McClorey. Fr. Cornelius had charge of the three parishes in Seria, Kuala Belait, and Bandar Seri Begawan until Fr. Ivan Fang came back to work in Bandar Seri Begawan in December 1992.

Archbishop Alberto Tricarico formally opened the newly constructed, air-conditioned Parish Hall on 5 June 1993, as part of the rectory's 1992 enlargement project, which started in July and was finished in 1993. In addition, the rectory's expansion into St. John's Library was finished in 1996. Bishop Anthony Lee consecrated Fr. Robert Leong in Kuala Belait in 2003.
