= Church of Our Lady of Immaculate Conception, Seria =

Roman Catholic church in Seria, Brunei

Church of Our Lady
- Church of Our Lady of Immaculate Conception
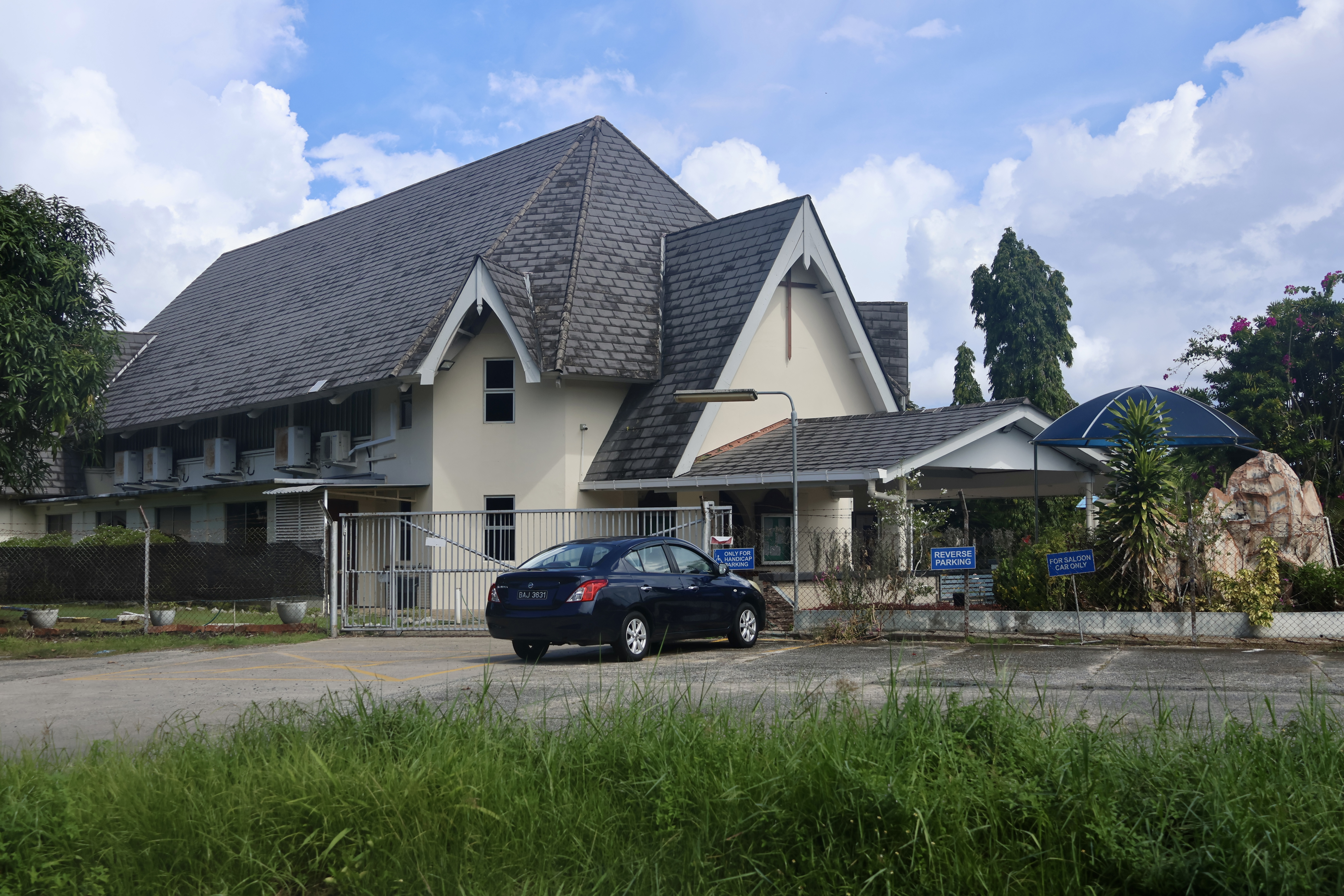
- The church in 2024

- Location within Brunei
- 4.6131026°N 114.3352345°E
- Address: Lot 2649, No. 49, Jalan Lorong 1 Barat, Seria KB3533
- Country: Brunei
- Denomination: Roman Catholic
- Website: rcvbd.com

History
- Former name: St. Michael's Church
- Status: Active
- Founder: Sisters of St. Joseph
- Dedication: Virgin Mary

Architecture
- Architect: Fenner
- Groundbreaking: June 1955
- Completed: 28 July 1956

Administration
- Division: Belait District
- Diocese: Apostolic Vicariate of Brunei Darussalam

Clergy
- Bishop: sede vacante
- Priest: Robert Leong

The Church of Our Lady of Immaculate Conception (COOL) is a Roman Catholic church of the Apostolic Vicariate of Brunei in the town of Seria, Belait District. The late Cardinal Cornelius Sim, the most well-known Catholic in the country, gave it enormous popularity. It is the second of three Roman Catholic churches in the nation; the other two being the St. John's Church in Kuala Belait and the Pro-Cathedral of Our Lady of the Assumption in the Brunei capital Bandar Seri Begawan.

== Design ==
The church is situated next to the acclaimed Catholic school St. Michael's School at the intersection of Jalan Raja Isteri and Jalan Lorong 1 Barat. The church has an unusual hip and roof valley design. The white church represents Mary's immaculate conception and her invitation to holiness for all people. The church's altar is adorned with a cross, and its large front yard and lush landscaping add to the natural ambiance.

== History ==
Fr. Leo Barry became the new Rector of Kuala Belait and Seria Missions in 1952. The Church of Our Lady in Seria was founded with the cornerstone placed in June 1955 by Monseigneur Vos, the Vicar Apostolic of Kuching. The church was under construction by November 1955. In 1956, the Sisters of St. Joseph established the convent in Seria. The Church of Our Lady was the name of the new Roman Catholic church that is constructed in Seria as part of the Seria/Kuala Belait Mission's plans to build a new Seria English School (St. Michael's School), a convent school, a church, and a rectory. Monseigneur Vos, blessed and opened the Church of Our Lady, Seria on 28 July 1956. On the next day, the church was solemnly inaugurated. The architect was Fenner from British Malayan Petroleum's Engineering Department, and J. Rogers, the paint advisor, painted the church's cross by hand. The next year, the town took over as the primary station.

Brother Peter Tann became the first person in Brunei to be ordained as a priest in January 1970, after Bishop Anthony Galvin performed the ordination in the Church of Our Lady. Brother Cornelius Sim was consecrated as a priest by Bishop Anthony Lee, on 26 November 1989, at the Church of Our Lady. On 22 March 2021, Father Robert Leong, the parish priest of the church, was named Vicar General of the Apostolic Vicariate of Brunei.
