= Catholic Church in Brunei =

- Malay: Gereja Roman Katolik Di Negara Brunei Darussalam
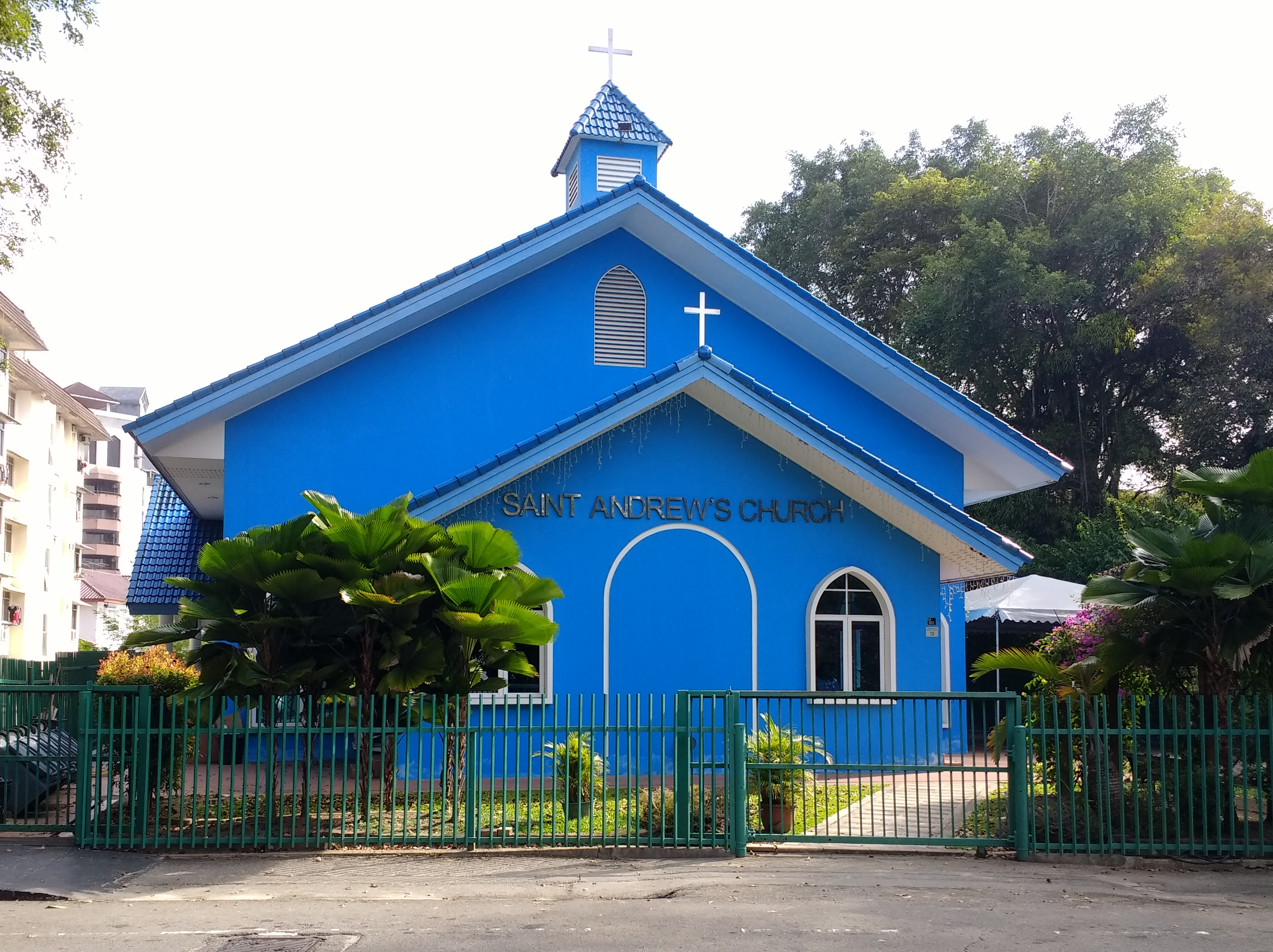
- St. Andrew's Church, Bandar Seri Begawan
- Type: National polity
- Classification: Catholic
- Orientation: Asian Christianity, Latin
- Scripture: Bible
- Theology: Catholic theology
- Governance: CBCMSB
- Pope: Leo XIV
- Apostolic Delegate: Wojciech Załuski
- Bishop: Sede vacante
- Region: Brunei
- Language: Malay, Latin
- Headquarters: Pro-Cathedral of Our Lady of the Assumption
- Members: 16,800 (3.6%)

The Catholic Church in Brunei Darussalam is a part of the worldwide Catholic Church, in communion with the pope in Rome, and constitutionally recognised within the state of Brunei Darussalam. The entire territory of the Church in Brunei is organised as an apostolic vicariate, under the leadership of a bishop, since 2005.

While no formal diplomatic relations exist between the Holy See and Brunei, there are existing quasi-diplomatic contacts between the church and government agencies at multiple levels. Since 1990, a papal nuncio has visited the country annually to make contact with the local church as well as the foreign affairs ministry. The Apostolic Delegation to Brunei Darussalam was established in 1998 following the establishment of the distinct Bruneian ecclesiastical territory as an apostolic prefecture. The Bruneian ecclesiastical jurisdiction falls under the purview of the Catholic Bishops' Conference of Malaysia, Singapore and Brunei.

In the modern day, the Catholic Church has been said to play an "important role" in interreligious dialogue in Brunei.

== Early history ==
The first recorded Catholic missionaries arrived in Brunei in 1587, in the form of two Spanish Franciscan priests. However, it was not until 1855 that Brunei was included under its first ecclesiastical circumscription, as part of the Apostolic Prefecture of Labuan and North Borneo, and formally included under that territory in 1927. During the intervening years, a small church was set up in Brunei, dedicated to Our Lady of Every Grace, while the first baptisms of Bruneians were recorded. The church was eventually dismantled.

In 1929, the first church and mission school building to be physically located in the town of Kuala Belait in a multi-purpose building were established. The Kuala Belait Catholic community came to be known under the patronage of St. John during the 1950s. Up until this point, Brunei had been serving as an outstation of Our Blessed Sacrament Parish in Labuan. Fr. Crowther of the Mill Hill Missionaries was made the first resident priest in the state of Brunei; other clergy visited from neighbouring missions intermittently.

In 1941, another mission was established in then Brunei Town, with a building constructed on donated land that included church, living quarters and school facilities; the school and church came under the titled name of St. George. The resident priest was the principal. During the Japanese occupation, the school and church facilities ceased to function for their originally designated purposes, and were partly utilized by Japanese forces; the mission continued after the closing of hostilities.

In 1945, the Mill Hill Missionaries and the Sisters of St. Joseph combined efforts to form the Seria English School, then located on the present day location of Brunei Shell Recreation Club. In 1952, coinciding with the period in which Brunei became listed under the Apostolic Vicariate of Kuching, the Seria English School was relocated to elsewhere in Seria town, and renamed St. Michael's School, which had become overcrowded with male and female students by 1955. During 1955, the Church of Our Lady (colloquially referred to as St Michael's Church) was opened. In 1956, the Sisters of St. Joseph established St. Angela's School, up the road from St Michael's School, and the former was officially designated as an all-girls school, with the latter becoming an all-boys school. Following this development of infrastructure in the area, Seria became the headstation of the Brunei mission.

Between 1959 and 1976, the Apostolic Vicariate of Miri-Brunei was formed, which eventually was raised to Diocese of Miri-Brunei.

== Elevation to distinct territory ==
On 21 November 1997, Pope John Paul II elevated Brunei to the status of an apostolic prefecture; for the first time in history, Brunei was to become a distinct ecclesiastical jurisdiction. Cornelius Sim was appointed as the country's first apostolic prefect; he had been vicar general of the then Diocese of Miri-Brunei.

"It is clear that in the borders of the state of Brunei the Catholic life has flourished to such an extent that it should become independent, I say ecclesiastical. [...] We, therefore, acting in the solemn office of the Supreme Shepherd of the whole flock of God, having that right jurisdiction, with the utmost exercise of our power do separate from the diocese of Miri that civil province which is called by the common name "Negara Brunei Darussalam", from which we therefore establish a new Apostolic Prefecture of Brunei…"

— Part of the apostolic constitution for the establishment of the Apostolic Prefecture of Brunei. Translated from original Latin.

On 20 October 2004, Pope John Paul II further elevated Brunei to the status of an apostolic vicariate; the wholly separate Brunei territory would now be shepherded by an apostolic vicar.

"In order to better advise the work of evangelization in the Apostolic Prefecture of Brunei, whose seat is in the city of Bandar Seri Begawan within the borders of Negara Brunei Darussalam, the Congregation for the Evangelization of Peoples, having considered the matter early and taking into account the favorable wishes of those concerned, decided that a new Apostolic Vicariate should be established there. We, therefore, who act in the most important office of Shepherd and Head of the Catholic Church, having approved such a decision, have raised the aforementioned Apostolic Prefecture of Brunei to the rank of Apostolic Vicariate with the same preserved name of Brunei..."

— Part of the apostolic constitution for the establishment of the Apostolic Vicariate of Brunei. Translated from original Latin.

Pope John Paul II appointed Cornelius Sim as the first bishop and apostolic vicar of Brunei. Sim was then appointed as the first cardinal from Brunei, and more broadly the first from Borneo in November 2020. He died in 2021 and in 2023 the position is vacant.

During the COVID-19 pandemic, the vicariate introduced livestreaming of Mass for the faithful to participate in a virtual capacity during lockdown measures.

== See also ==
- Apostolic Vicariate of Brunei Darussalam
- Religion in Brunei
- Christianity in Brunei
- Freedom of religion in Brunei
