= Apostolic Vicariate of Brunei =

Catholic missionary jurisdiction

Apostolic Vicariate of Brunei Apostolicus Vicariatus Bruneiensis Vikariat Kerasulan Brunei

Catholic
- The Vicariate Logo

Location
- Country: Brunei
- Territory: Bandar Seri Begawan; Seria; Kuala Belait
- Episcopal conference: Catholic Bishops' Conference of Malaysia, Singapore and Brunei
- Ecclesiastical province: Immediate subject to Holy See
- Metropolitan: Bandar Seri Begawan

Statistics
- Area: 5,800 km^{2} (2,200 sq mi)
- Population: Total; Catholics: (as of 2010); 398,000; 21,000
- Parishes: 3

Information
- Denomination: Catholic
- Sui iuris church: Latin Church
- Rite: Roman Rite
- Established: 21 November 1997 (as Apostolic Prefecture of Brunei); 20 October 2004 (as Apostolic Vicariate of Brunei)
- Cathedral: Our Lady of the Assumption
- Secular priests: 4

Current leadership
- Pope: Leo XIV
- Apostolic Vicar: Richard Ng (de facto acting)
- Apostolic Administrator: Robert Leong

Website
- Website of the Apostolic Vicariate

The Apostolic Vicariate of Brunei Darussalam (Latin: Vicariatus Apostolicus Bruneiensis) is a Latin Catholic ecclesiastical jurisdiction covering the territory of Brunei and headed by an apostolic vicar. The first apostolic vicar was Cornelius Sim, who was created a cardinal in 2020 and died in May 2021.

== History ==
The earliest mission to Brunei was conducted by Spanish Franciscan priests in 1587, namely Francesco de Santa Maria and Miguel Juan de Plasencia. These Spanish missionaries who were residing in the Philippines came to Brunei before they baptised the Kadazans in Sabah. The roots in the ministry then continued by Missionary Society of St. Joseph (Mill Hill Missionaries). Throughout the years, the local Church was administered by various ecclesiastical jurisdictions centred in Labuan, Jesselton (now Kota Kinabalu), Kuching and Miri, cities in neighbouring Malaysia.

The earliest record on the vicariate territory dates to 1885, when Brunei was included in the Apostolic Prefecture of Northern Borneo, and formally included in 1927. Until 1936, when a church was established in Kuala Belait, the vicariate primarily was an outstation of Our Blessed Sacrament Parish in Labuan. On 14 February 1952, the Holy See carved out the territory of the current vicariate from that of the Apostolic Vicariate of Jesselton, then transferred the territory to the Apostolic Vicariate of Kuching (now Archdiocese of Kuching). The separation of Bruneian territory formerly under the Diocese of Miri-Brunei (now simply known as the Diocese of Miri) created a distinct Bruneian church. This territory was designated as an apostolic prefecture in November 1997, headed by Monsignor Cornelius Sim, at the time the Vicar General of Miri-Brunei, and a Bruneian priest, as its first apostolic prefect. On 22 February 1998, the Apostolic Prefecture of Brunei Darussalam came into being with the proclamation of the papal bull to the faithful and the installation of the apostolic prefect. On 20 October 2004, less than seven years after it was formed, the apostolic prefecture was elevated to an apostolic vicariate. Msgr. Sim was appointed the first apostolic vicar, carrying the dignity of a titular bishop: his episcopal ordination took place in January 2005. In 2020, he was named cardinal by Pope Francis, became the first from Brunei, and was short-lived before his death a few months later, leaving the vicariate currently vacated.

== Administration ==
The vicariate is a territory under the ecclesiastical authority of an apostolic vicar, who sits on the Catholic Bishops' Conference of Malaysia, Singapore and Brunei. Additionally, the vicariate is represented diplomatically by the Holy See through the Apostolic Delegation to Brunei Darussalam. The papal delegate to Brunei is resident in the Holy See's diplomatic mission in Kuala Lumpur.

Similarly, for canon law matters, the vicariate is served by the tribunal of the Archdiocese of Kuala Lumpur.

The vicariate has historically been administered pastorally through commissions responsible for different aspects of church corporate life. The commissions are directed by appointed clergy, and see representation from the parishes. The role of these commissions is to foster a more aligned vision and direction among the parishes in the various aspects of church governance.

== Parishes ==
It is estimated that there are around 21,000 Catholics in Brunei. The majority are expatriate Filipinos; others are mainly Chinese, South Asian or indigenous people.

The vicariate consists of three parishes, all located in major cities or towns. The parishes are:

- Church of Our Lady of the Assumption (formerly St. George's Church) in Bandar Seri Begawan
- Church of Our Lady of Immaculate Conception (formerly Church of Our Lady or St. Michael's Church) in Seria
- St. John's Church in Kuala Belait

There are three diocesan priests. During the COVID-19 pandemic, the vicariate introduced livestreaming of Mass for the faithful to participate in a virtual capacity during lockdown measures.

== Social Ministry ==
The Society of St Vincent de Paul is active in the vicariate, where they gather monetary and physical aid and distribute to those in need.

== Religious Orders ==
- Order of Friars Minor (OFM)
- Mill Hill Missionaries (MHM)

== Education ==
There are three schools under the ownership and management of the vicariate, all providing elementary and high school education. All the schools are coeducational.

- St. George's School in Bandar Seri Begawan
- St. John's School in Kuala Belait
- St. Angela's Convent School in Seria (former all-girls school, coeducational as of 2007)

St. Michael's School in Seria was a former all-boys school, officially closed down as of 2006.

The schools are not subsidised or aided by the government, and are thus run on a full fee-paying basis. These schools were initially subsidised by the government until 1 January 1960.

As the government does not allow catechism lessons during school hours or on school premises, separate catechism lessons are given on Sundays and Fridays.
