= Cornelius Sim =

Bruneian cardinal (1951–2021)

His Eminence Cornelius Sim DD
- Cardinal; Vicar Apostolic of Brunei
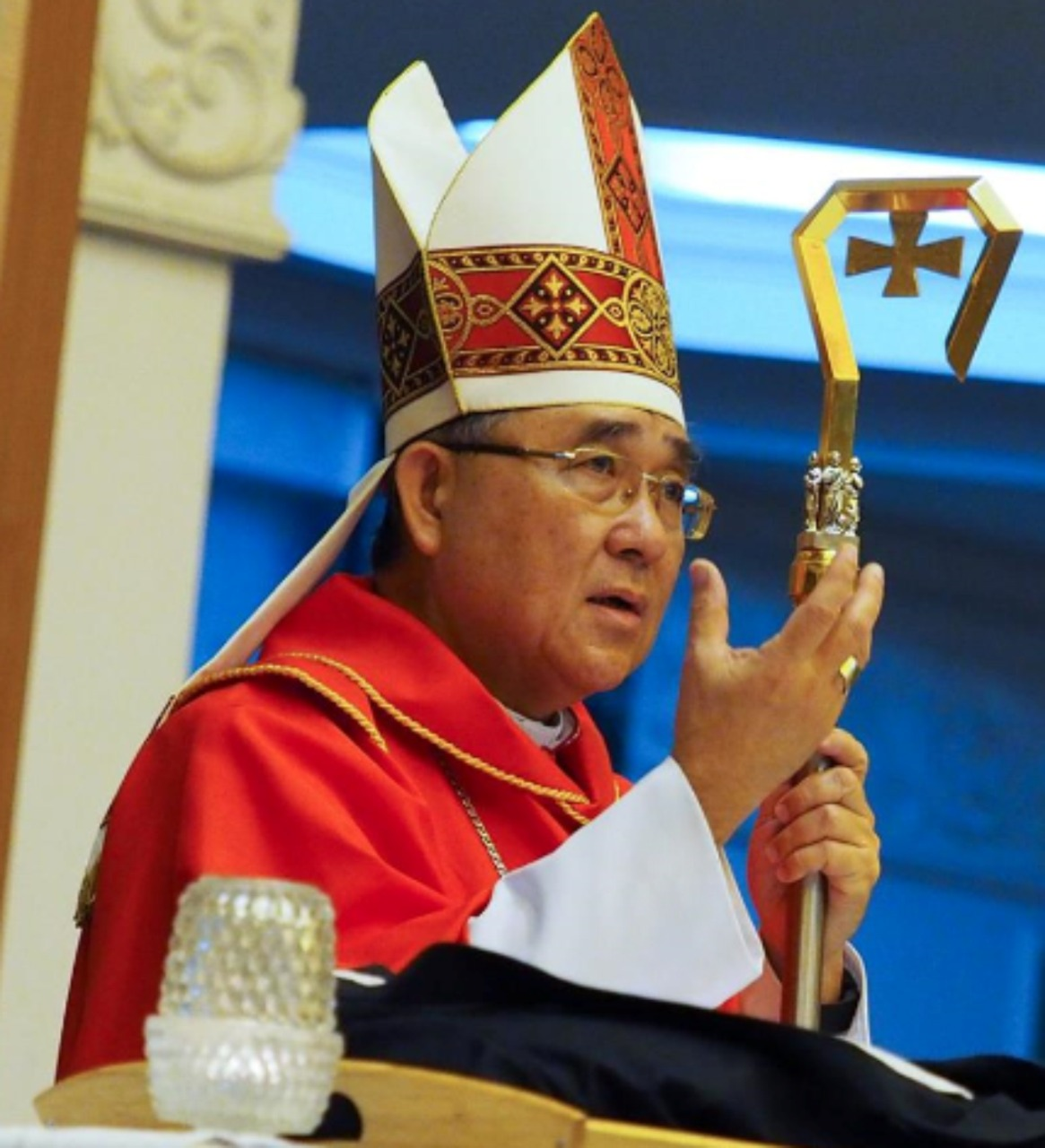
- Sim during his homily
- See: Brunei Darussalam
- Installed: 21 January 2005
- Term ended: 29 May 2021
- Other posts: Vice-President of the Catholic Bishops' Conference of Malaysia, Singapore and Brunei (2017–2021); Cardinal Priest of San Giuda Taddeo Apostolo (2020–2021)
- Previous posts: Vicar General of Brunei (1995–1997); Apostolic Prefect of Brunei (1997–2004); Titular Bishop of Putia in Numidia (2004–2020); General Secretary of the Catholic Bishops' Conference of Malaysia, Singapore and Brunei (2015–2017)

Orders
- Ordination: 26 November 1989 by Anthony Lee Kok Hin
- Consecration: 21 January 2005 by Salvatore Pennacchio
- Created cardinal: 28 November 2020 by Pope Francis
- Rank: Cardinal priest

Personal details
- Born: Cornelius Sim; 16 September 1951 Seria, Belait, Brunei
- Died: 29 May 2021 (aged 69) Taoyuan, Taiwan
- Buried: Kuala Belait Christian Cemetery
- Denomination: Roman Catholic
- Education: University of Dundee; Franciscan University of Steubenville
- Motto: Duc in altum ('Put out into the deep'; Luke 5:4)
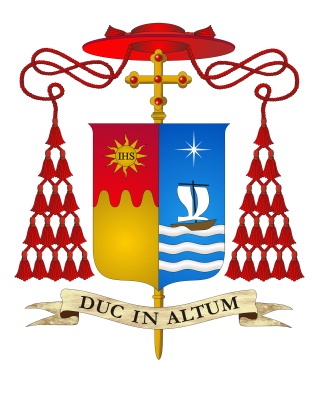
- Coat of arms

Styles of Cornelius Sim
- Reference style: His Eminence
- Spoken style: Your Eminence
- Religious style: Cardinal
- Informal style: Cardinal

Cornelius Sim DD (16 September 1951 – 29 May 2021) was a Bruneian prelate of the Catholic Church who served as Vicar Apostolic of Brunei from 2004 until his death. He had previously served as the apostolic prefect of Brunei from 1997 to 2004.

Sim was the first graduate of the Franciscan University of Steubenville priestly discernment program to be ordained to the priesthood. Pope Francis raised him to the rank of a cardinal on 28 November 2020, making him the first cardinal from the country, and from the island of Borneo. Sim has been credited as "Brunei's most famous Catholic" and a "towering figure" in the history of Bruneian Christianity.

== Early life ==
Sim was born in Seria, Brunei, on 16 September 1951. He was the eldest of six children of Lawrence Sim and Monica Yeo, and his grandparents were the first Catholics in their village, with the Church's history in Brunei documented most prominently from the 19th century onwards. He was of Chinese and Dusunic descent. He was raised a Catholic and educated in Catholic schools, but practised his faith less as he reached adulthood.

Sim earned an engineering degree from Dundee University in Scotland. After this he stopped practising his faith. He worked in utilities operations of Brunei LNG, a joint-venture between the Bruneian government, Royal Dutch Shell and Mitsubishi, from 1978 to 1985; he spent some of these years working abroad. Returning to Brunei, he rediscovered his Catholic faith and grew close to a charismatic group that downplayed doctrine and emphasised personal relationships with God. He earned a master's degree in theology at the Franciscan University of Steubenville, Ohio, in 1988. He returned to Brunei in 1988 and served as an administrator in St John's Church, Kuala Belait until his ordination as deacon on 28 May 1989.

== Presbyteral ministry ==
Sim was ordained to the priesthood on 26 November 1989. He became the country's first local priest. He served the faithful in Brunei alongside two other missionary priests resident in Brunei, until 1991. Following this, Sim served all parishes as the sole priest in Brunei for an indefinite period during which he pledged that there would be "no let up" in services to the faithful. He was appointed vicar general of Brunei in 1995, which was part of the Diocese of Miri in Malaysia at the time. After Brunei was split from Miri to form the Apostolic Prefecture of Brunei, Pope John Paul II named Sim apostolic prefect on 21 November 1997. He was installed there on 23 February the following year.

Sim attended the 1998 Asia Synod of Bishops and was observed as a "young prefect apostolic" at the time. Three years later in 2001, Sim also attended the ad limina visit to Pope John Paul II by prelates from the Bishops' Conference of Malaysia, Singapore and Brunei.

== Episcopal ministry ==
Pope John Paul II elevated the Prefecture of Brunei to the status of a vicariate and appointed Sim the first Apostolic Vicar of Brunei and Titular Bishop of Putia in Numidia on 20 October 2004.

=== Bishop ===
He received his episcopal consecration on 21 January 2005 from Archbishop Salvatore Pennacchio at the Church of Our Lady of the Assumption in Bandar Seri Begawan. The co-consecrators were John Ha Tiong Hock, Archbishop of Kuching and Anthony Lee Kok Hin, Bishop of Miri. He requested that his ordination be held in Brunei rather than Rome, so that the local faithful could take part. On a number of occasions, Sim publicly advocated for peaceful and tolerant relations among Bruneians of all religious affiliations. He was also involved in the activities of schools operating under his authority, publicly attending functions such as Chinese New Year. Sim frequently acted as the representative of the Christian community in Brunei during government engagements locally and abroad, including with foreign diplomatic missions, local ministries and the supreme court. Sim also made visits to overseas missions such as in Timor Leste.

As the first local bishop in Brunei, Sim introduced seven priorities for the local Church: adult faith formation, Bible literacy, youth, family, vocations, evangelisation and social welfare, particularly for migrants.

In June 2005, Sim welcomed the Holy See's foreign minister to Brunei, who during his visit met with Brunei's deputy sultan.

Sim made an ad limina visit on 5 June 2008 to the Apostolic Palace in the Vatican for an audience with Pope Benedict XVI.

As far back as 2012, Sim is reported to have been celebrating red masses in Brunei or in neighbouring dioceses.

On 15 July 2014, Sim backed calls made by Brunei's reigning sultan to the country to pray for peace in Palestine amid rising tensions. Sim urged Catholics to pray for peace, and also pledged the Catholic Church's support towards Brunei government aid initiatives.

Sim celebrated his 10th episcopal anniversary and coincidentally his silver jubilee of ordination to the priesthood on 21 January 2015 with a commemorative Mass at the Church of Our Lady of the Assumption in Bandar Seri Begawan. The Mass was concelebrated with the other resident priests from Brunei, as well as several prelates and guest priests representing neighbouring dioceses from the Philippines, Kota Kinabalu, Sandakan, Keningau and Singapore, as well as the Apostolic Delegation to Brunei Darussalam. In the following days, Sim and the visiting apostolic delegate attended an audience ceremony at one of the Brunei royal houses.

On 8 February 2018, Sim made an ad limina visit to the Vatican for an audience with Pope Francis.

After mid-2018, Sim spoke of the present day need for Christians to counter the spread of 'fake news' in the media.

In May 2018, Sim publicly attended the silver jubilee celebrations at the Kota Kinabalu archdiocese.

Sim frequently attended Confirmation retreats throughout Southeast Asia.

During Christmas of 2018, Sim spoke to local media in Brunei as thousands reportedly attended prayer services in the capital city, stating that Christians have time to find a "deeper purpose" for the occasion, and need to go "back to simplicity" to capture the day's true spirit.

In August 2019, Sim celebrated the 50th anniversary of the Church of Our Lady of the Assumption since the parish's inception in local Brunei.

During the COVID-19 pandemic, Sim introduced livestreaming of Mass for the faithful to participate in a virtual capacity during lockdown measures.

=== Cardinal ===
On 25 October 2020, Pope Francis announced he would raise Sim to the rank of cardinal at a consistory scheduled for 28 November 2020. Sim accepted the appointment "for the good of the Church and the peoples in the region", saying it was "a good sign for the nation". Cardinal Charles Maung Bo sent public congratulations to Sim on behalf of the Federation of Asian Bishops' Conferences. Sim continued to credit his charismatic roots as the basis of his faith, allowing that the movement has been appropriately "domesticated, maybe for good reason". He did not attend the consistory in Rome because of travel restrictions related to the COVID-19 pandemic. He thus also was not present when the new appointed cardinals accompanied Pope Francis to visit the former Pope Benedict XVI at the Mater Ecclesiae Monastery. He expected to receive the symbols of his new rank when the new Apostolic Delegate to Brunei, Archbishop Wojciech Załuski, could travel to take up his post. At that consistory, Pope Francis made him Cardinal-Priest of San Giuda Taddeo Apostolo. On 16 December 2020, he was named a member of the Congregation for the Clergy. His biretta and ring were couriered to Brunei at a later date after the consistory. In spite of a quietened coverage of his elevation as he did not attend the consistory, Sim still recognised his appointment to the cardinalate as being a sign of worldwide recognition of the nation's Christian community in general. Sim sent a Marian gift in gratitude to Pope Francis on behalf of the Catholic community of Brunei.

In March 2021, Sim joined with other Asian cardinals in calling for "peace and reconciliation" in Myanmar. During his final address to his congregation in May that year, Sim urged the People of God in Brunei not to "be spectators" in his absence, but to make visible their contributions of "time, talent and treasure."

== Illness, death and legacy ==
Sim died on 29 May 2021 at Chang Gung Memorial Hospital (CGMH) in Taoyuan, Taiwan. He was 69, and suffered a cardiac arrest. He had travelled to Taiwan for cancer treatment. His passing received coverage in local state-influenced and independent news media and online forums, as well as Catholic outlets throughout the world. Tributes were sent following his death from prelates in neighbouring dioceses in the Southeast Asian region, as well as from state dignitaries in Brunei. Speaking on Sim's death, the Archbishop of Kuala Lumpur Julian Leow said, "Brunei has lost one of her illustrious sons, the Bishops' Conference, a dear brother and the Church, a prince." Archbishop of Kota Kinabalu John Wong said, "Cardinal Sim left an unforgettable mark in his untiring and devoted service to the Church, and for his constant advocacy of dialogue and peace for all people in Brunei." The United States Embassy in Brunei expressed its "deep sadness" at the passing of the "charismatic leader" Cardinal Sim.

On the day of Sim's passing, Pope Francis sent a telegram of condolence praising Sim's "generous service" to the Apostolic Vicariate of Brunei and to the Holy See, while also expressing his sadness in learning of the cardinal's death, and expressing solidarity with his family as well as the clergy and faithful of Brunei. The Apostolic Vicariate of Brunei suspended all church activities throughout the country except Masses for two weeks to observe a period of mourning for the late cardinal while his body was being returned to Brunei, from Taiwan.

A wake (ceremony) was held for the late cardinal at the Church of Our Lady of Assumption, the parish which housed his cathedra in Brunei's capital, on 14 June 2021 as his body lay in state, enabling mourners to pay their respects. A requiem was held the next day, 15 June, at 9 AM and his body was driven through Brunei to all other parishes for the congregations to pay their last respects, before being buried in Kuala Belait. Among those in attendance at the funeral service were members of the diplomatic corps in Brunei, as well as representatives from other Christian churches and prominent local community figures.

On 5 September 2021, exactly 100 days following Sim's death, the Christian Institute for Theological Engagement (CHRISTE) announced the appointment of the first Cornelius Cardinal Sim Professor, the Rev. Deacon Prof. Dr. Sherman Kuek. The professorship's main mission is facilitating research on theological and interreligious dialogue. The date set for the official appointment was 16 September 2021, corresponding to Sim's 70th birth anniversary. On All Souls' Day in November 2021, Pope Francis held a mass at the Throne of Saint Peter in St. Peter's Basilica in Vatican City for the repose of Sim's soul, as well as of all other cardinals and bishops who had passed on in the last year.

Sim was among the contributing theologians and bishops of a youth edition release of the New Testament intended for the young peoples of Asia, which was launched at the FABC general conference in Thailand on 21 October 2022.

In mid 2023, upon being announced as a new cardinal-designate, Sebastian Francis paid tribute to Sim and other cardinals from Singapore and Malaysia.

In late 2023, a requiem was celebrated in Brunei for the late Sim by Kuching archbishop Simon Poh.

== Honours ==
- Cornelius Cardinal Sim Professorial Chair of Theology and Dialogue - The Christian Institute for Theological Engagement (CHRISTE) – (2021)

== See also ==
- Cardinals created by Pope Francis
- Apostolic Vicariate of Brunei Darussalam
- Catholic Church in Brunei
- Ethnic Chinese in Brunei

Catholic Church titles
New title	Vicar General of Brunei; 1995–1997	Succeeded by Himself as Apostolic Prefect of Brunei
Preceded by Himself as Vicar General of Brunei	Apostolic Prefect of Brunei; 1997–2004	Succeeded by Himself as Apostolic Vicar of Brunei
Preceded by Himself as Apostolic Prefect of Brunei	Apostolic Vicar of Brunei; 2004–2021	Vacant
Preceded by James Richard Ham	Titular Bishop of Putia in Numidia; 2004–2020	Succeeded by Osório Citora Afonso
Preceded by Michael Teng	General Secretary of the Catholic Bishops' Conference of Malaysia, Singapore and Brunei; 2015–2017	Succeeded by William Goh Seng Chye
Preceded by Sebastian Francis	Vice-President of the Catholic Bishops' Conference of Malaysia, Singapore and Brunei; 2017–2021	Succeeded by William Goh Seng Chye
First position established	Cardinal Priest of San Giuda Taddeo Apostolo; 2020–2021	Succeeded by Giorgio Marengo
