= Pro-Cathedral of Our Lady of the Assumption (Brunei) =

Roman Catholic church in Bandar Seri Begawan, Brunei

- Location within Brunei
- 4°53′43″N 114°56′19.9″E
- Address: No. 11, Jalan Kumbang Pasang, Bandar Seri Begawan, BS8671
- Country: Brunei
- Denomination: Roman Catholic
- Website: rcvbd.com

History
- Former name: St George Church
- Status: Active
- Dedication: Our Lady of the Assumption
- Dedicated: 15 August 1969
- Consecrated: 15 August 1969

Architecture
- Years built: 1957
- Completed: 1969

Administration
- District: Brunei–Muara District
- Diocese: Apostolic Vicariate of Brunei Darussalam

Clergy
- Bishop: sede vacante
- Priest: Arin Sugit

The Pro-Cathedral of Our Lady of the Assumption or simply Church of Our Lady of the Assumption, is a Roman Catholic church located in Bandar Seri Begawan, the capital of Brunei.

== History ==
Before the church was built in 1957, a small chapel, a school, and a parsonage existed. A local Catholic, George Newn Ah Foott, donated the land where these structures were built. The new church replaced the chapel.

The construction of the current church started in 1957 took 12 years to complete. The church was consecrated on Aug. 15, 1969, the feast of Assumption of Mother Mary. A painting of Mary Assumed into Heaven, just below a crucifix of Jesus, adorns the backdrop of the church’s main altar.

The church is the pro-cathedral or temporary cathedral of the ecclesiastical jurisdiction, follows the Roman or Latin rite and serves as the seat of the Apostolic Vicariate of Brunei Darussalam (Vicariatus Apostolicus Bruneiensis) who obtained that status in 2004 by bull "Ad aptius consulendum" the Pope John Paul II.

It was under the pastoral responsibility of the Cardinal Cornelius Sim until 29 May 2021. It is the largest church in Brunei and is in the heart of the capital.

== See also ==
- Roman Catholicism in Brunei
- Pro-Cathedral
