= Seria =

Town in Brunei

- Municipal area and town
- Pekan Seria ڤكن سریا
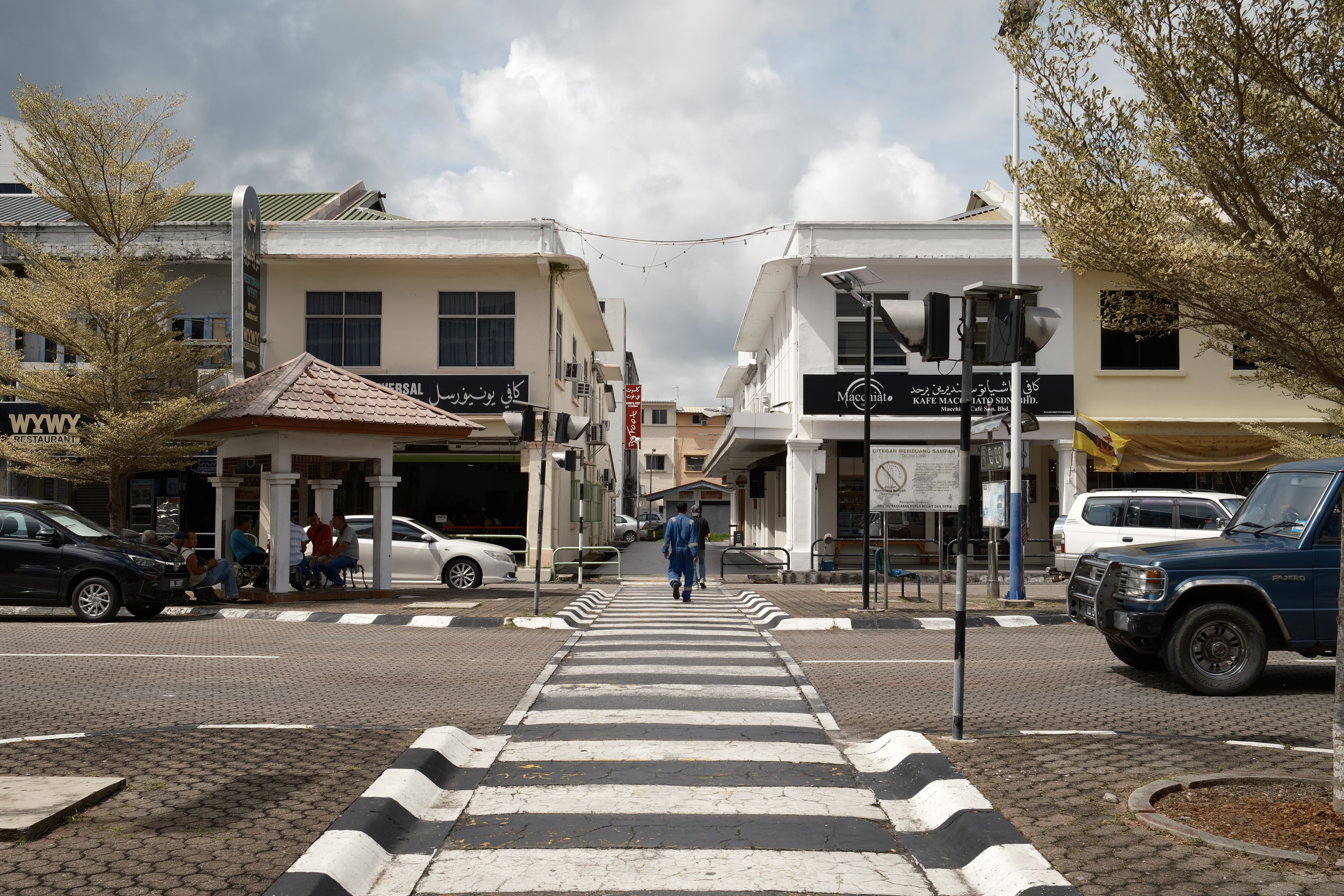
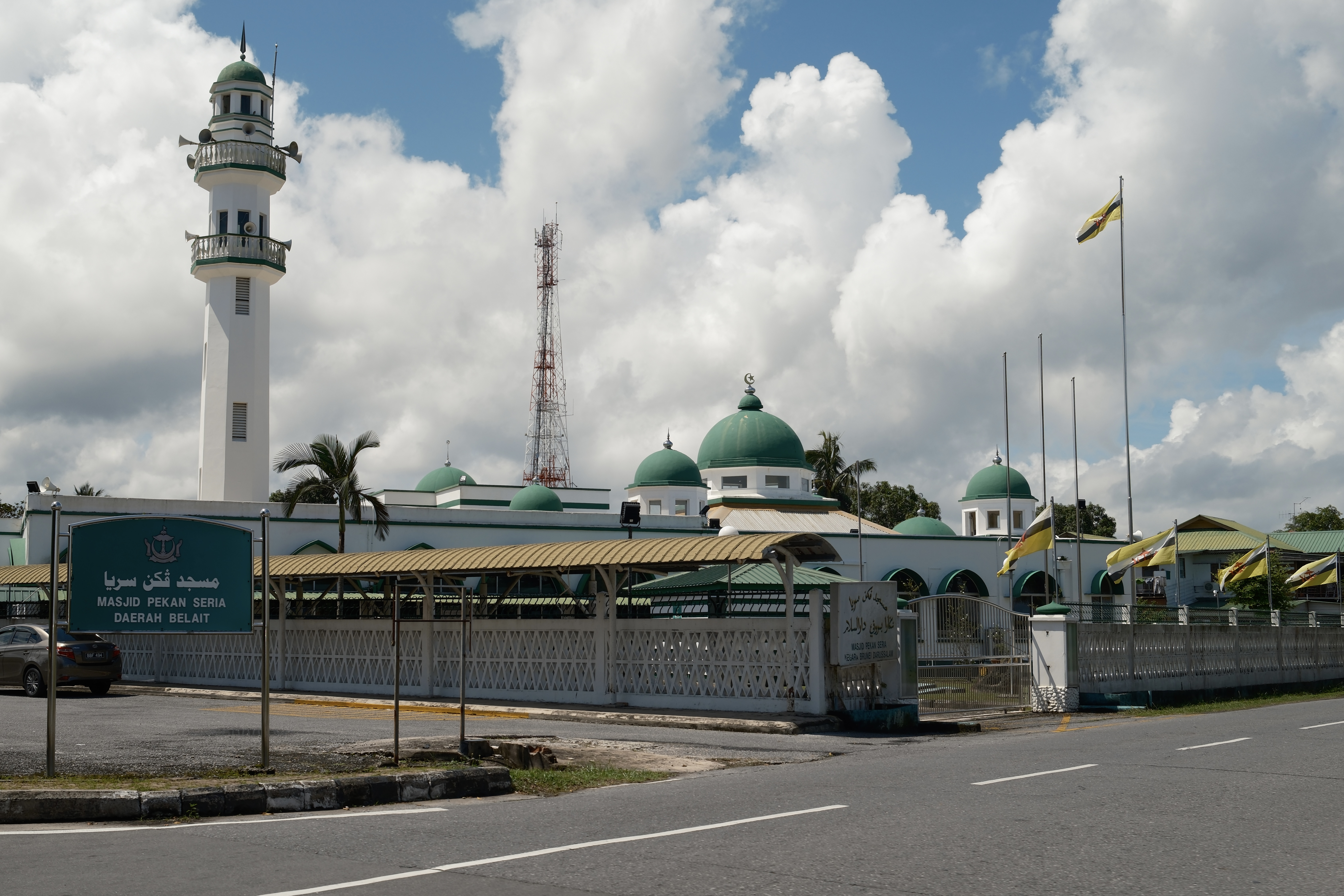
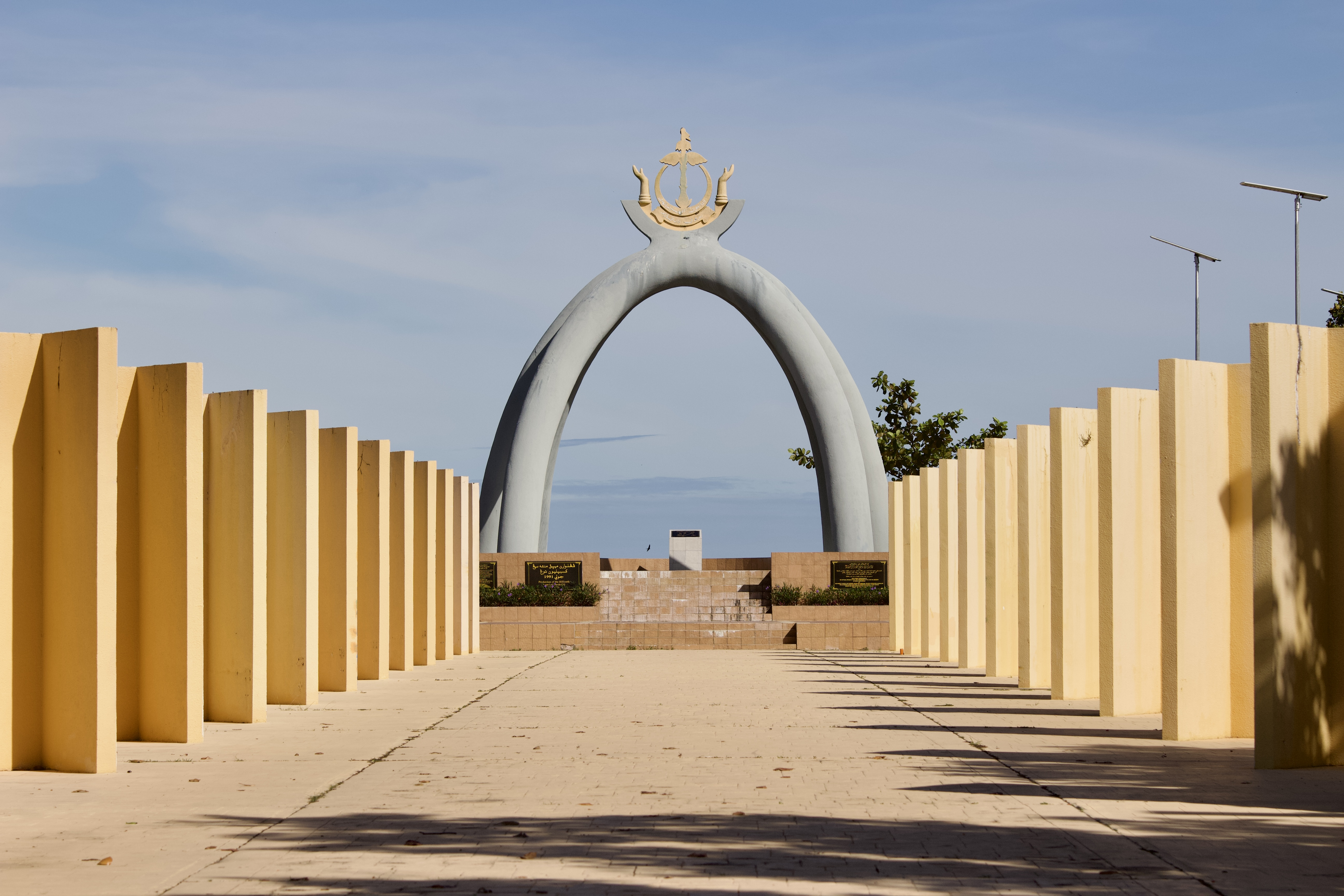
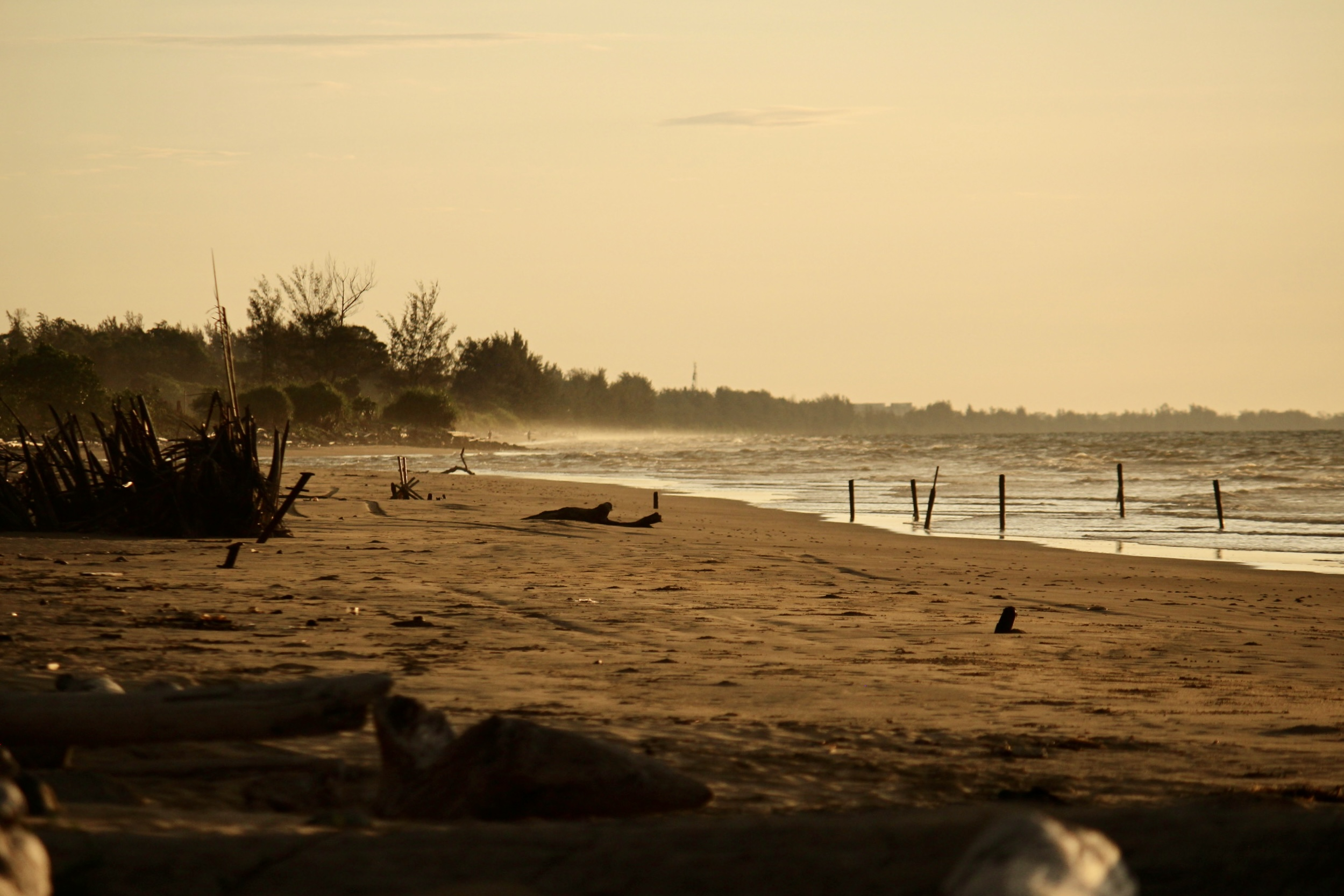
- Clockwise from top left: Seria Town, Pekan Seria Mosque, Seria Energy Lab, Seria coast

- Location in Brunei
- Coordinates: 4°36′51″N 114°19′49″E
- Country: Brunei
- District: Belait
- Mukim: Seria
- Municipality: 1936

Government
  - Body: Kuala Belait and Seria; Municipal Board
  - Village head: Jamail Linap

Area
  - Municipal area: 1.56 km^{2} (0.60 sq mi)

Population (2021)
  - Total: 2,659
- Postcodes: KB1133, KB1233
- Website: bandaran-kb.gov.bn

Seria (Note: SUH-ree-yah; Malay pronunciation: [sǝria]; Jawi: سریا; Chinese: 诗里亚; pinyin: Shīlǐyǎ) or officially known as Seria Town (Malay: Pekan Seria), is a town in Belait District, Brunei. It is located about 65 kilometres (40 mi) west from the country's capital Bandar Seri Begawan. The total population was 3,625 in 2016. It was where oil was first struck in Brunei in 1929 and has since become a centre for the country's oil and gas industry.

== Etymology ==
The town's name was derived from that of the river near where oil was first discovered in 1929. In the past, Seria used to be known as Padang Berawa, the local name which has been translated as 'Wild Pigeon's Field', and referred to the area between the Bera and Seria rivers. However, the original name has become forgotten today. Berawa is also a word of Indonesian origin, meaning low ground (usually in coastal areas) and flooded with water, usually with lots of aquatic plants, an apt description of what Seria had been in the past. Thus suggesting as well that the original name may have Indonesian or Javanese influence.

== Geography ==
Seria is located within a mangrove swamp and surrounded by an oil field.

Climate data for Seria
Month	Jan	Feb	Mar	Apr	May	Jun	Jul	Aug	Sep	Oct	Nov	Dec	Year
Mean daily maximum °C (°F)	30 (86)	30 (86)	31 (87)	31 (88)	31 (88)	31 (88)	31 (88)	31 (88)	31 (87)	31 (87)	31 (87)	31 (87)	31 (87)
Mean daily minimum °C (°F)	23 (74)	23 (74)	23 (74)	24 (75)	24 (75)	24 (75)	23 (74)	23 (74)	23 (74)	23 (74)	23 (74)	23 (74)	23 (74)
Average precipitation mm (inches)	430 (16.8)	170 (6.5)	140 (5.5)	110 (4.4)	210 (8.2)	300 (12)	220 (8.5)	210 (8.4)	300 (11.8)	300 (11.7)	370 (14.5)	290 (11.3)	3,040 (119.6)
Source: Weatherbase

The town has a narrow 5,000 hectares (12,000 acres) coast with the South China Sea. It has been identified by BirdLife International as an Important Bird Area (IBA). As well as open sea, it contains tidal mudflats and sandflats, mangroves and beach forest which support populations of various birds, including Bornean crestless firebacks, grey imperial pigeons, short-toed coucals, lesser adjutants, Chinese egrets, Wallace's hawk-eagles, Malay blue-banded kingfishers, and straw-headed bulbuls.

== History ==
The first oil field in Brunei was discovered by the British Malayan Petroleum Company (BMPC) in 1929, with the completion of the first commercial oil well later that year on the west bank of the Seria River. Oil production began in 1931, and the first export followed in 1932. By 1935, royalties from Seria's oil accounted for 47% of the state's revenue. In 1936, Seria was officially designated a town and incorporated into the Kuala Belait and Seria Sanitary Board, which was managed by the Assistant British Resident.

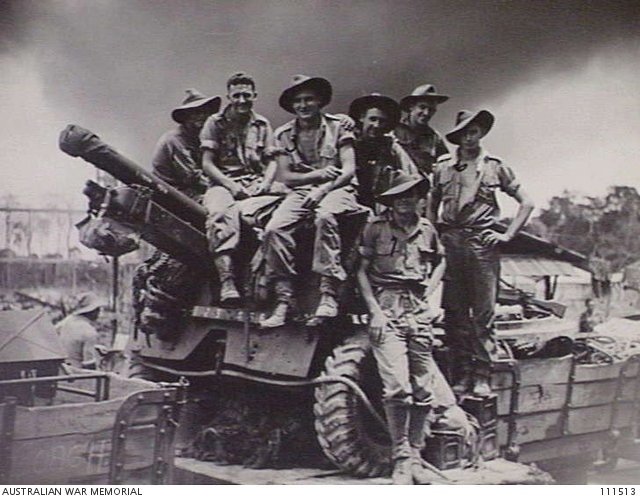
Australian soldiers sitting on an Ordnance QF 25-pounder in 1945

During World War II, Seria was one of the first places in Borneo to be invaded by the Imperial Japanese Army. The Kawaguchi Detachment landed on 16 December 1941, just nine days after the attack on Pearl Harbor. In response, the British forces destroyed the oil field to prevent it from falling into Japanese hands. On 28 April 1945, the United States Navy launched an attack on Japanese-occupied areas in the Asia–Pacific, including Seria. The town was liberated by Australian forces on 29 June 1945, but by the time they arrived, the oil field had been severely damaged and only restored to production in November that year. By 1946, the original town had been completely destroyed. In the post-war period, Seria's high oil productivity and the presence of Indonesian workers employed by the BMPC prompted the British to closely monitor the situation, concerned about potential labour unrest and the spread of revolutionary Indonesian ideals.

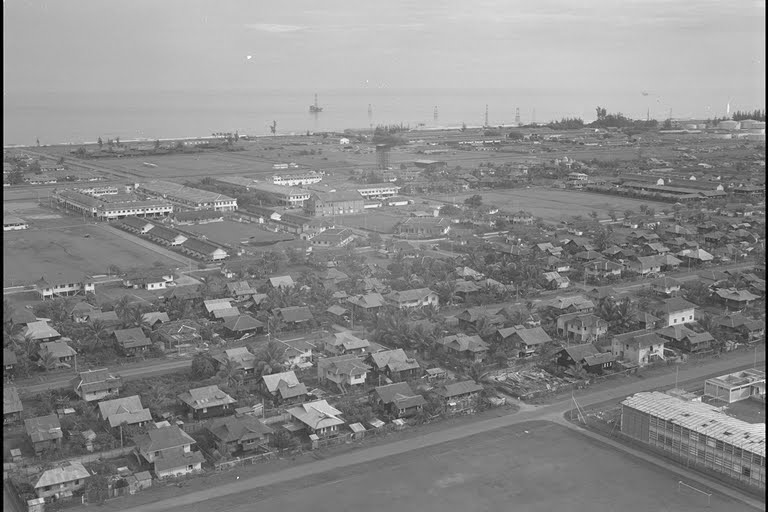
Aerial view of Seria in the 1950s

By the 1950s, Seria, the hub of Brunei's oil industry, had become a unique environment where the oil company operated almost like a state within a state. The Malays in Seria were slightly better off than those in other parts of Brunei, benefiting from the economic activities of the oil industry. However, despite the financial growth driven by oil, the overall welfare of the local population improved only marginally. British colonial policy kept the indigenous population insulated from the disruptive effects of rapid development, maintaining a conservative status quo with limited social change. In 1951, following a wage increase by the BMPC, a strike by 97 out of 127 watchmen in Seria led to the disbandment of the force, with some workers dismissed while others were reassigned. By 1952, political tensions rose as various groups attempted to form political organisations, spreading their activities across Brunei Town, Seria, and parts of Sarawak. The Brunei government, receiving crucial intelligence from the BMPC, became aware of A. M. Azahari's infiltration into various sectors of society, particularly targeting Seria's oil workers. Azahari held secret meetings in Seria, where he met H. Hidup Besar, a former BMPC employee who became a key political associate, organising the workers for Azahari's cause. In 1953, the Seria Sanitary Board was upgraded to the Municipal Board, marking a shift in local governance.

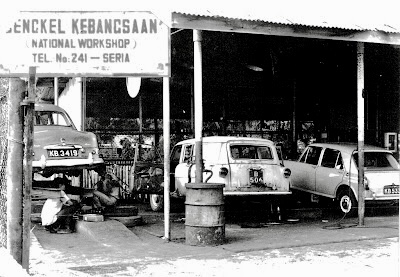
A workshop in Seria during the 1950s

In the early 1950s, cinema became a popular form of entertainment in Seria, where the BMPC organised free open-air screenings for its employees. This reflected a broader trend in Brunei, where mobile cinema units and public address systems were used to engage communities in towns and villages. G. L. Ness aptly described Brunei as a land of "mosques and movie goers." In August 1954, the Brunei government established a special Security Force of 175 men to safeguard the oilfields in Seria. This force was supplemented by Malayans from the Peninsula, who underwent training under A. N. Outram, the Superintendent of the Police Training School in Kuching, as part of efforts to bolster regional security.

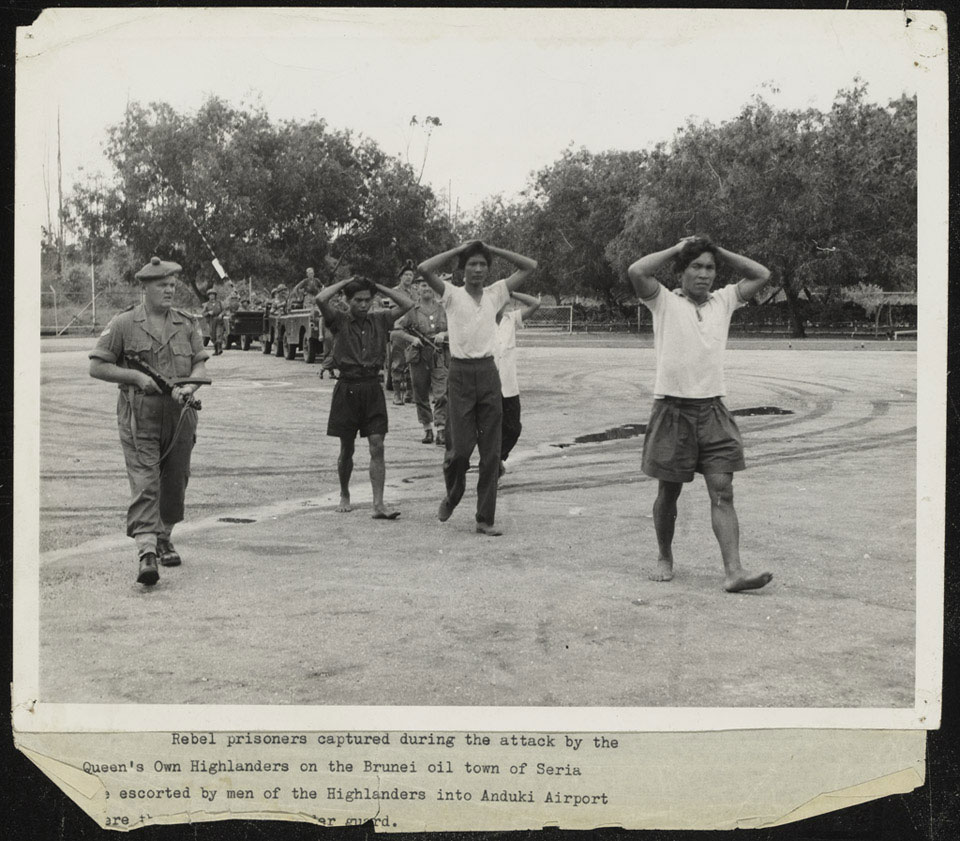
Captured rebels being marched into Anduki Airfield in December 1962

During the Brunei revolt, Seria was one of the key targets of the rebels' coordinated surprise attacks, along with Brunei Town and other coastal settlements. While police detachments in smaller towns surrendered with little resistance, the security forces in Seria, Brunei Town, and Kuala Belait managed to hold their ground. Despite early rebel gains, their ultimate objective of establishing the Unitary State of North Kalimantan was not achieved. On 11 December, British forces from the 1/2nd Battalion Gurkha Rifles and the Queen's Own Highlanders swiftly recaptured Seria and Kuala Belait. Reinforcements from Singapore soon followed, and a bold operation on 12 December successfully freed hostages held at the Panaga police station in Seria. Acting on British advice, Sultan Omar Ali Saifuddien III diplomatically deferred Tunku Abdul Rahman's offer of military aid to the British, eventually agreeing to accept 150 Malayan policemen to address concerns for the safety of Malayan officers in Brunei. He also approved the deployment of two British Gurkha garrisons—one stationed in Seria to safeguard the vital oil installations, and another in Brunei Town.

The Municipal Board was overseen by the Belait District Officer from 31 October 1985, and from 1 November 1985 onwards, it has been administered by the chairman.

== Administration ==
Seria officially constitutes two village subdivisions, in which they are under Mukim Seria:

Village	Population (2021)	Postcode	Ketua kampung (2024)
Pekan Seria Kawasan 1	1,908	KB1133	Haji Jamail bin Haji Linap
Pekan Seria Kawasan 2	751	KB1233	Haji Jamail bin Haji Linap
Total	2,659	-	-

Seria has also been incorporated as a municipal area (kawasan bandaran) since 1959 and is the responsibility of the Kuala Belait and Seria Municipal Board, which also oversees Kuala Belait. The municipal area constitutes 1.56 square kilometres (0.60 sq mi) and encompasses parts of the aforementioned village subdivisions, bounded by Jalan Tengah and the Seria Arena to the north, Jalan Lorong Satu Barat to the east, Jalan Bolkiah to the south, and Jalan Lorong Tiga Barat to the west.

== Economy ==
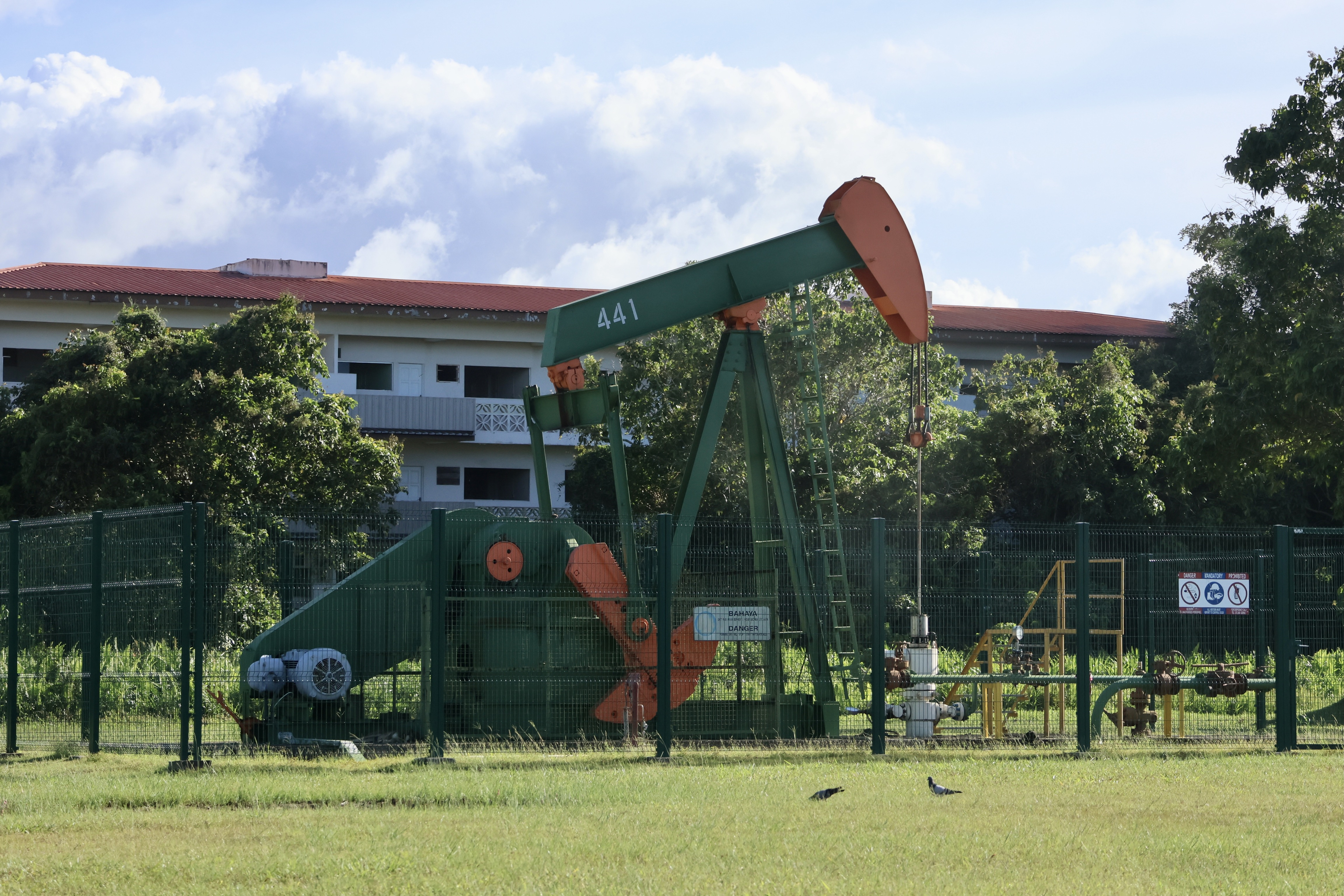
A working pumpjack near the Seria Refinery in 2023

=== Oil and gas ===
The town sits atop the Seria oil field, which was discovered in 1929 and has been continuously in production since then. Between 1932 and 1959, the Brunei Government earned $340 million in royalties from Seria’s oil production, significantly boosting its financial assets, which rose from $309,724 in 1932 to $144.5 million by 1952.

The Brunei Shell Petroleum (BSP) Company Limited is headquartered in Panaga and has various facilities related to the oil and gas industry in Seria. The Seria Refinery is the only refinery in Brunei and is located in the Sungai Bera area, together with the Seria Crude Oil Terminal (SCOT), the New Gas Compression Plant (NGCP) and the New Industrial Area (NIA). The open-air oil water treatment facility at the Sungai Bera Holding Basin (SBHB) has since been discontinued due to environmental reasons.

== Demography ==
=== Religion ===
Religions practiced in Seria include Islam which is adhered to by the majority of the local population, and Christianity, Sikhism, Hinduism, as well as Buddhism which are practiced overwhelmingly by permanent residents, foreign workers and migrants. There are two mosques in Seria, the main and oldest being Masjid Pekan Seria (Pekan Seria Mosque). There are also Christian churches, including the St. Margaret's Church and Church of Our Lady of Immaculate Conception.

== Transportation ==
=== Road ===
Most of the roads within the municipality are surfaced. There are buses taking passengers to Bandar Seri Begawan and Miri from Seria. The Kuala Belait Highway from the Malaysian border west of Sungai Tujuh, Kuala Belait links up with multiple other highways leading to Bandar Seri Begawan and Muara Town.

=== Rail ===
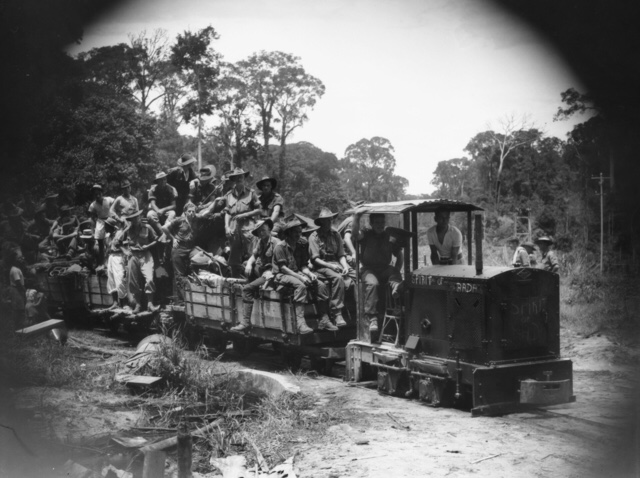
Australian soldiers on the railway journey from Badas to Seria in 1945

There are no working railways or light rail in Seria. The route and remnants of a 8 miles (13 km) wooden railway from Seria to Badas that was built by the British Malayan Oil Company (now Brunei Shell Petroleum) before the war to service the water supply to Seria from the Badas pumping station on the Sungai Belait are still visible.

BMP staff hid essential components of the railway from the Japanese during World War II who therefore were unable to restore it so it fell into disrepair. When the liberation forces of the Australian 9th Division arrived, these components miraculously re-appeared and the railway was quickly restored to action to carry two 25-pounder guns and ammunition to Badas, to harry a Japanese contingent that was still in the area.

=== Water ===
There are no ferry services, river services or port services in Seria. The nearest port is in Kuala Belait, and the nearest deepwater port in Brunei is Muara Port.

=== Air ===
There is a privately owned airfield in Anduki that caters mainly for flights to offshore Brunei Shell Facilities. Commercial travellers would have to travel to either Bandar Seri Begawan or Miri to catch a commercial flight. There is one helipad at Panaga Health Centre and at the Brunei Shell Petroleum Headquarters.

A heliport (ICAO: WBML) is located inside the British Army Jungle Warfare Training School. The helicopters belong to the No. 1563 Flight RAF, formerly No. 667 Squadron AAC, and No. 7 Flight AAC.

== Infrastructure ==
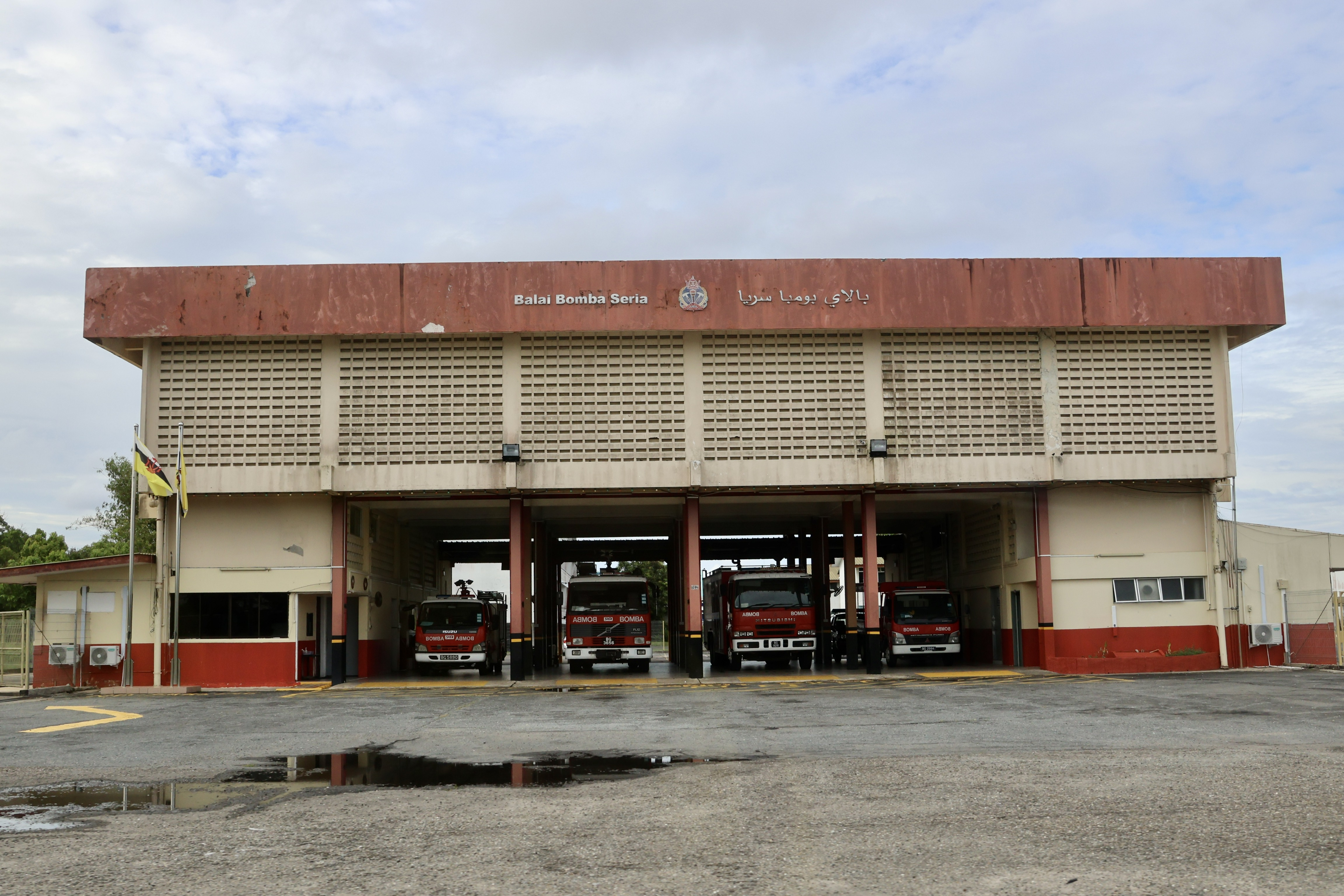
Seria Fire Station

In 1938, the first Seria Mosque was completed. In 1953, the Masjid Pekan Seria was rebuilt at a cost of B$250,000, becoming the first mosque in Brunei with a dome.

The 8 acres (3.2 ha) An-Naem Islamic cemetery was opened in Anduki, in 1993.

Electricity used to be locally generated with a natural gas-fired power plant. This has since been demolished and replaced by the Tenaga Suria Brunei (TSB) solar farm, with a generation capacity of 1.2 megawatts (1,600 hp). The B$20 million solar farm began operation in 2010.

The Seria Post Office served as the town's primary post office.

The RBPF CID training center was built in Seria in 1951.

The town is also home to the Consulate of the Netherlands and Sri Lanka.

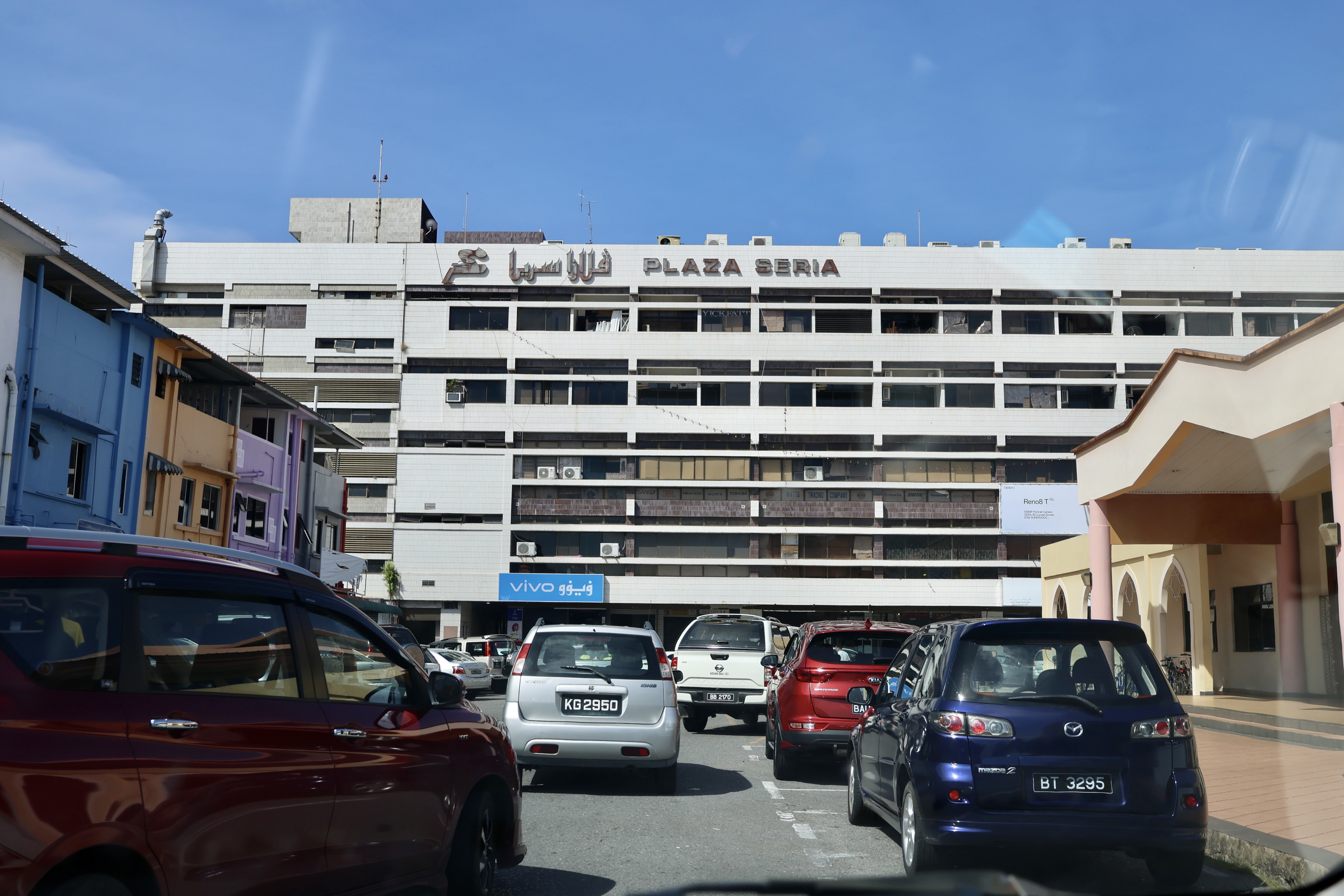
Seria Plaza

=== Commerce ===
The Pasarneka Seria, also known as Seria Wet Market, is the town's marketplace.

Seria Plaza is a shopping plaza in the commercial centre of the town.

The retailer's fifth location nationwide is the recently inaugurated Milimewah Department Store. It was reopened in 2019, after plans made to tear down and rebuild the historic shop houses, which were destroyed by fire in September 2015.

=== Education ===
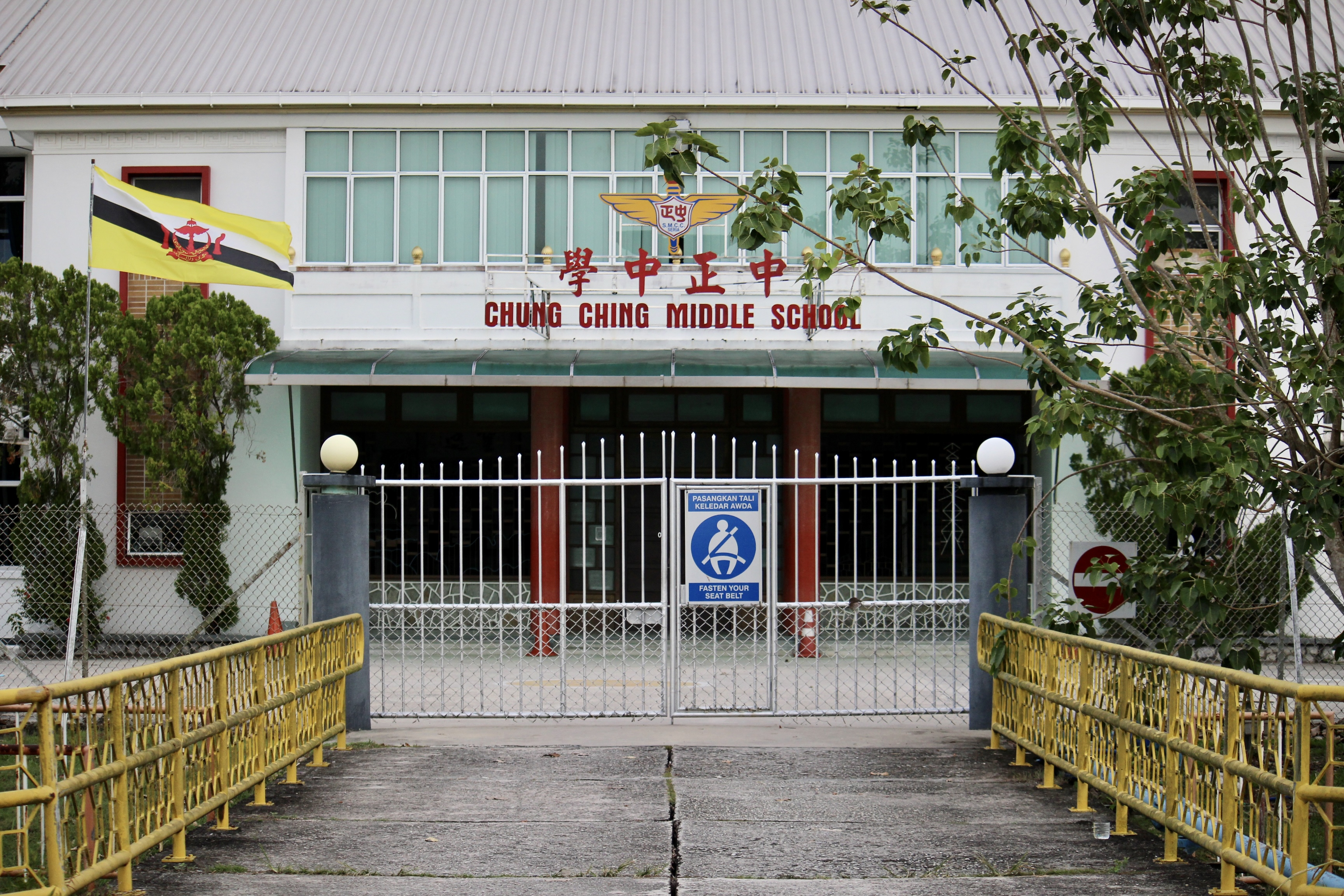
Chung Ching Middle School

Schools in Seria include:

- Pengiran Anak Puteri Rashidah Sa'adatul Bolkiah Religious School (Public Islamic Religious School)
- Pengiran Setia Negara Pengiran Mohd Yusof Primary School (Public)
- Muhammad 'Alam Primary School (Public)
- Anthony Abell College (Public)
- IBTE Sultan Bolkiah Campus (Public)
- Chung Ching Middle School (Private – Chinese)
- St. Angela's School (Private – Catholic former All-Girls School, but is now a boys' and girls' school since the merging with St Michael's)
- St. Margaret's School (Private – Anglican, One of the International school in Brunei)
- Panaga Primary School (Public)
- Hornbill School (Private)
- International School Brunei (Private – Seria Campus with only primary education)

St. Michael's Mission School was the first English school in the country. It was a Private Catholic All-Boys School. Due to declining numbers, it was closed down in late 2006 and its student body was merged with the formerly all-girls Catholic school, St. Angela's. On 12 February 1977, Seria Library opened its doors on Jalan Bunga Melur.

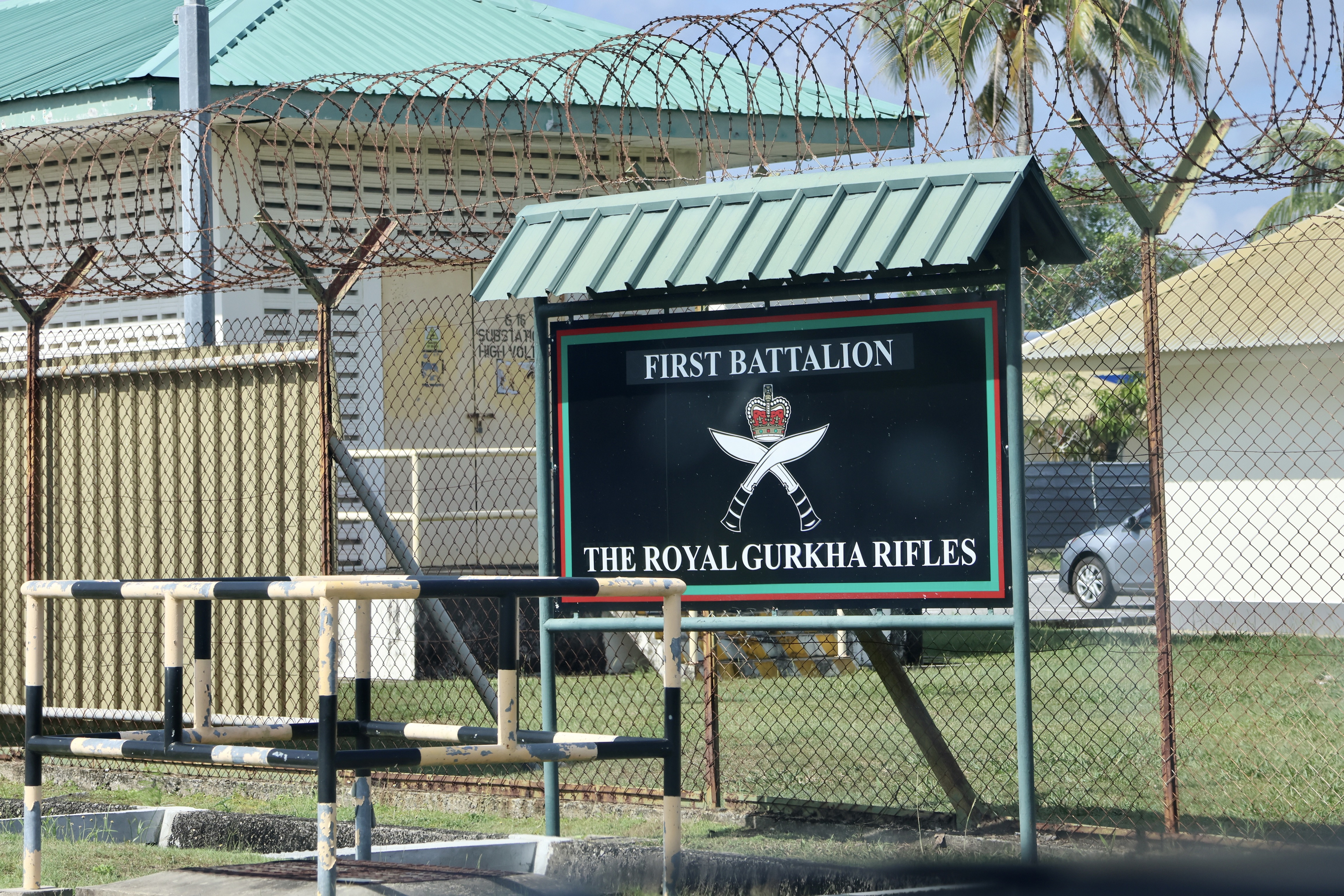
BFB Tuker Lines

=== Military ===
The British Forces Brunei headquarters was established in Seria, in 1963 by the request of then Sultan Omar Ali Saifuddien III. The three sites that make up Brunei Garrison are Sittang Camp (a training ground for jungle warfare), Medicina Lines (where Garrison Support Services are housed), and Tuker Lines (where Garrison Headquarters and the Resident Infantry Battalion (RIB) are based). In addition to Sittang Camp, the garrison is situated just outside of Seria. Additionally, there are a few Garrison Troops who assist the battalion in completing its job as well as the British Army Jungle Warfare Training School (TTB).

Numerous facilities are available at Brunei Garrison, including a fitness center, swimming pool, splash pool for young children, squash and tennis courts, a library, an education center, a post office, a sport complex, volleyball courts, basketball courts, a youth center for children, NAAFI, and Ramdhani (convenience store, canteen, dry cleaners, laundry, and tailoring service provided). Two community centers are located within the Garrison, where a variety of programs are administered by the AWS team, including moms and tots, SSAFA community events, coffee mornings, and various social events. Private events may be held in the community centers. Evening social gatherings in the garrison are centered around the Patio bar and Chautari restaurant. MRS, or the Medical Reception Station, is close to Tuker Lines. All Garrison personnel and their eligible dependents have access to a primary care facility through the Medical Reception Station (MRS).

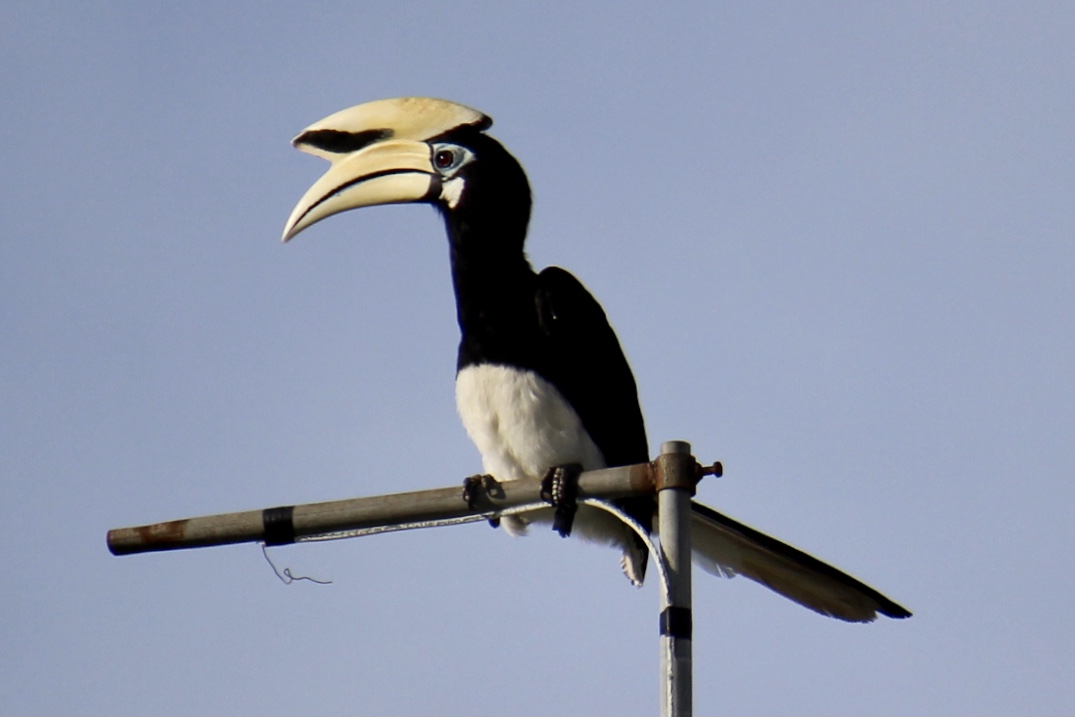
Oriental Pied Hornbill

=== Tourist attractions ===
- Pekan Seria Mosque – the oldest surviving mosque in Brunei, built in 1954.
- Seria Energy Lab (SEL) – an interactive museum officiated in 2002 and run by Brunei Shell Petroleum.
- Billionth Barrel Monument – a monument built in 1991, to commemorate the billionth barrel of crude oil produced from the Seria oil field.
- Panaga – home to a resident population of hornbills
- Marina Cinema – one of the few surviving former movie theaters, built in the 1950s. Since around 1991, it has been shuttered and left unoccupied.

=== Recreation and sports ===
Public recreational activities in Seria are mostly limited to the country clubs (Panaga Club and the Brunei Shell Recreation Club). There is an 18-hole golf course in Panaga Club and an Equestrian area in the Brunei Shell Recreation Club.

Fishing and windsurfing is carried out at the 63 hectares (160 acres) Anduki Jubilee Recreational Park (Malay: Taman Rekreasi Jubli Anduki). It was opened by His Majesty, the Sultan and Yang Di-Pertuan of Negara Brunei Darussalam, in 1992, a contribution from Brunei Shell Petroleum to commemorate the Silver Jubilee of the Sultan to the throne of Brunei.

The Arena Sports Complex consisted of a track and a football pitch. It is often used by the Football Association of Brunei Darussalam (FABD) for national football competitions.

== Notable people ==
- Craig Adams (born 1977), National Hockey League player who won the Stanley Cup with the Carolina Hurricanes and the Pittsburgh Penguins. He was born in Seria and raised in Calgary, Alberta, Canada.
- Norsiah Abdul Gapar (born 1952), a recipient of the S.E.A. Write Award 2009
- Mustappa Sirat (born 1957), a politician and minister
- Rozan Yunos (born 1963), a civil servant and writer
- Cornelius Sim (1951–2021), first Vicar Apostolic and Cardinal of Brunei
- Mardi Bujang (born 1984), retired footballer for Kasuka FC
- Hardi Bujang (born 1984), retired footballer for Kota Ranger FC

== Gallery ==
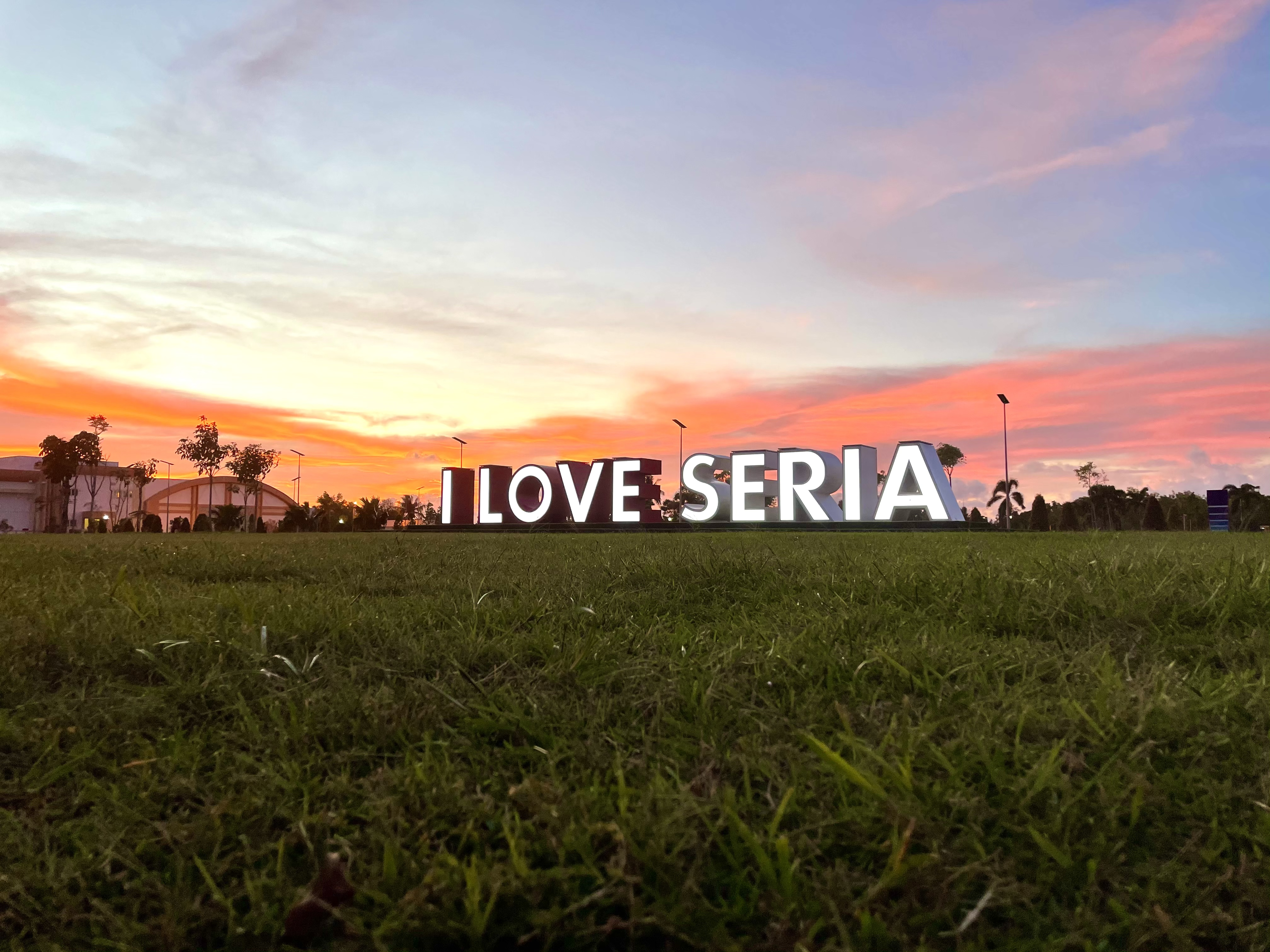
"I Love Seria" signage

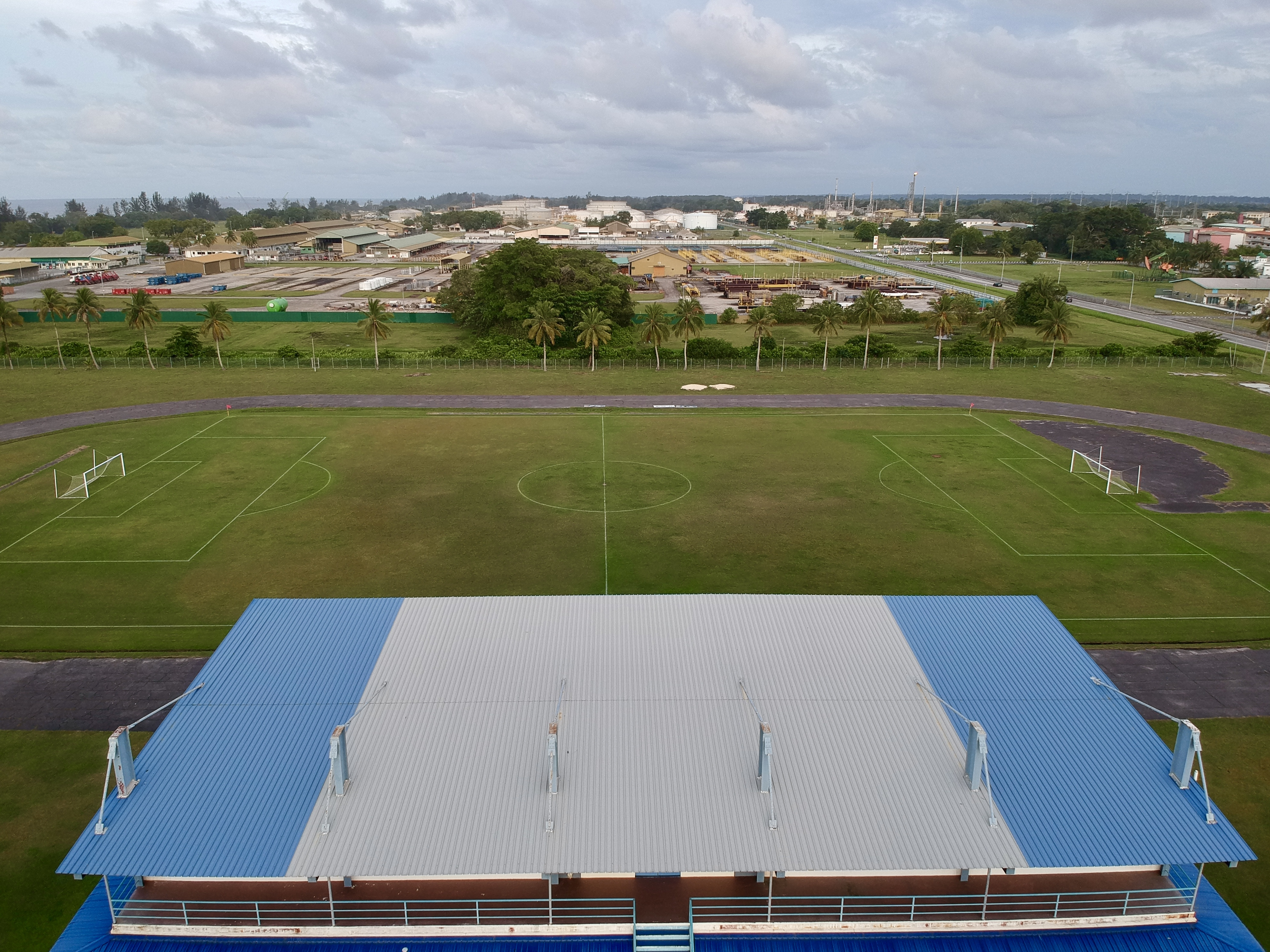
Arena Sports Complex

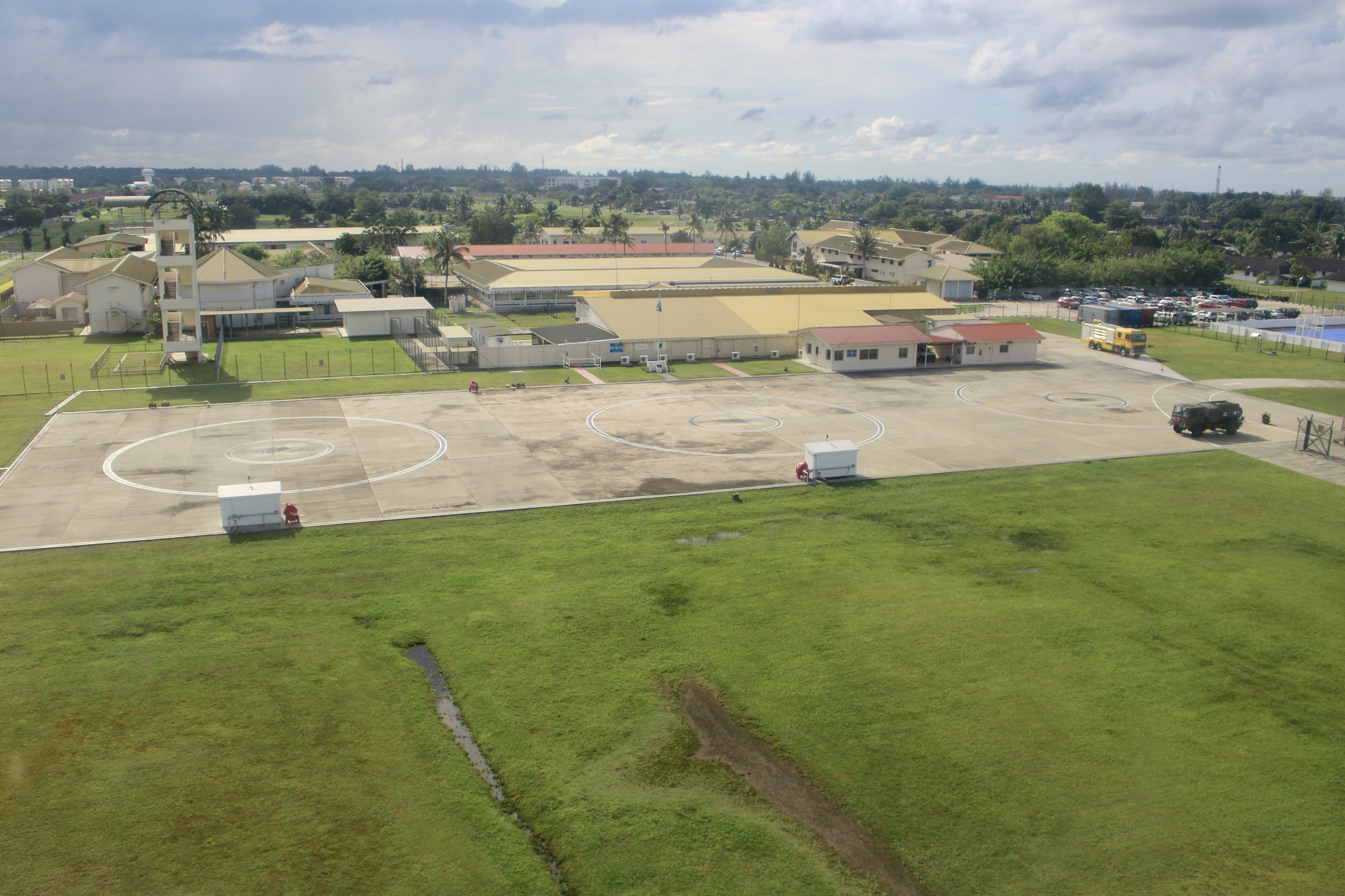
BFB Medicina Lines

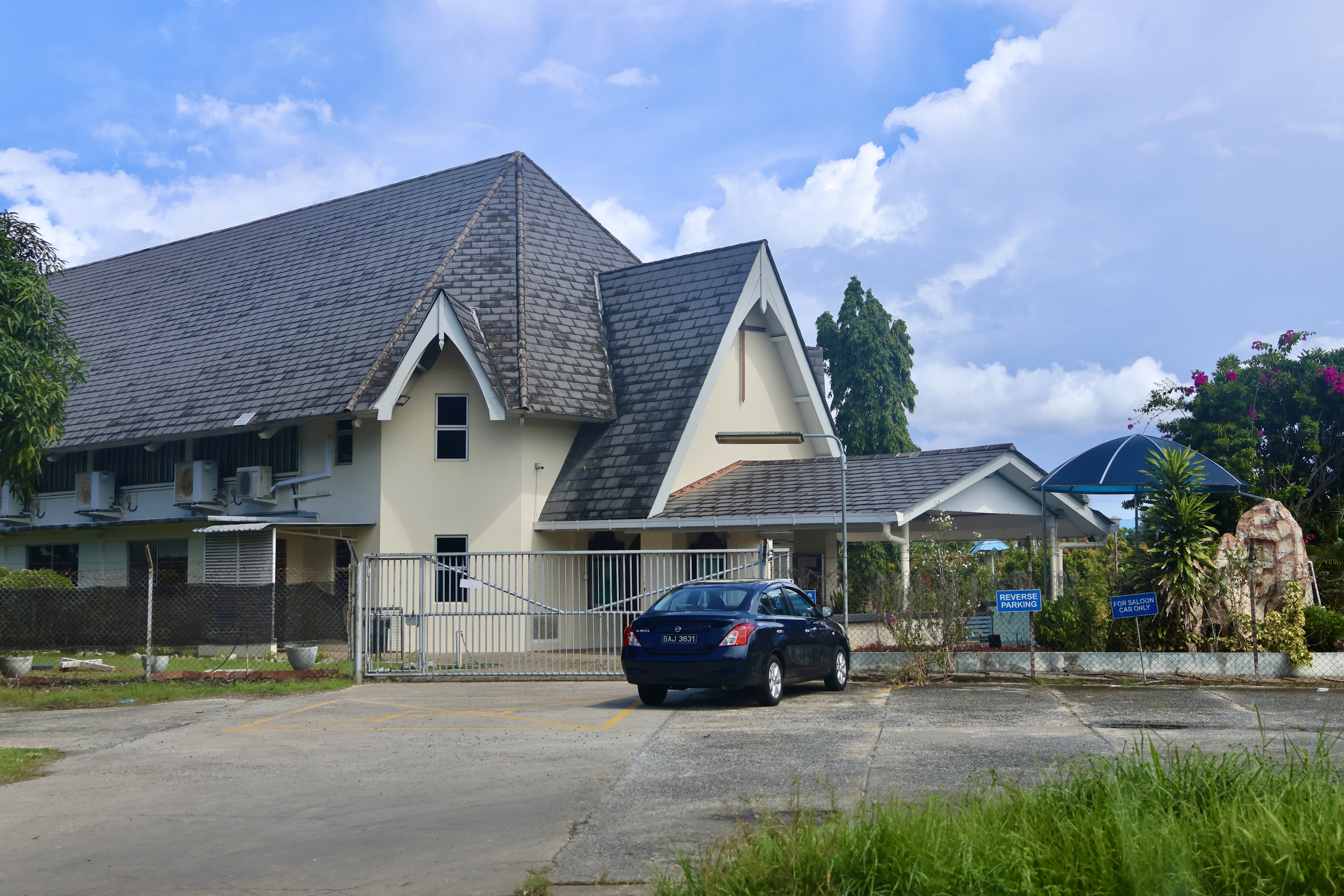
Church of Our Lady of Immaculate Conception, Seria

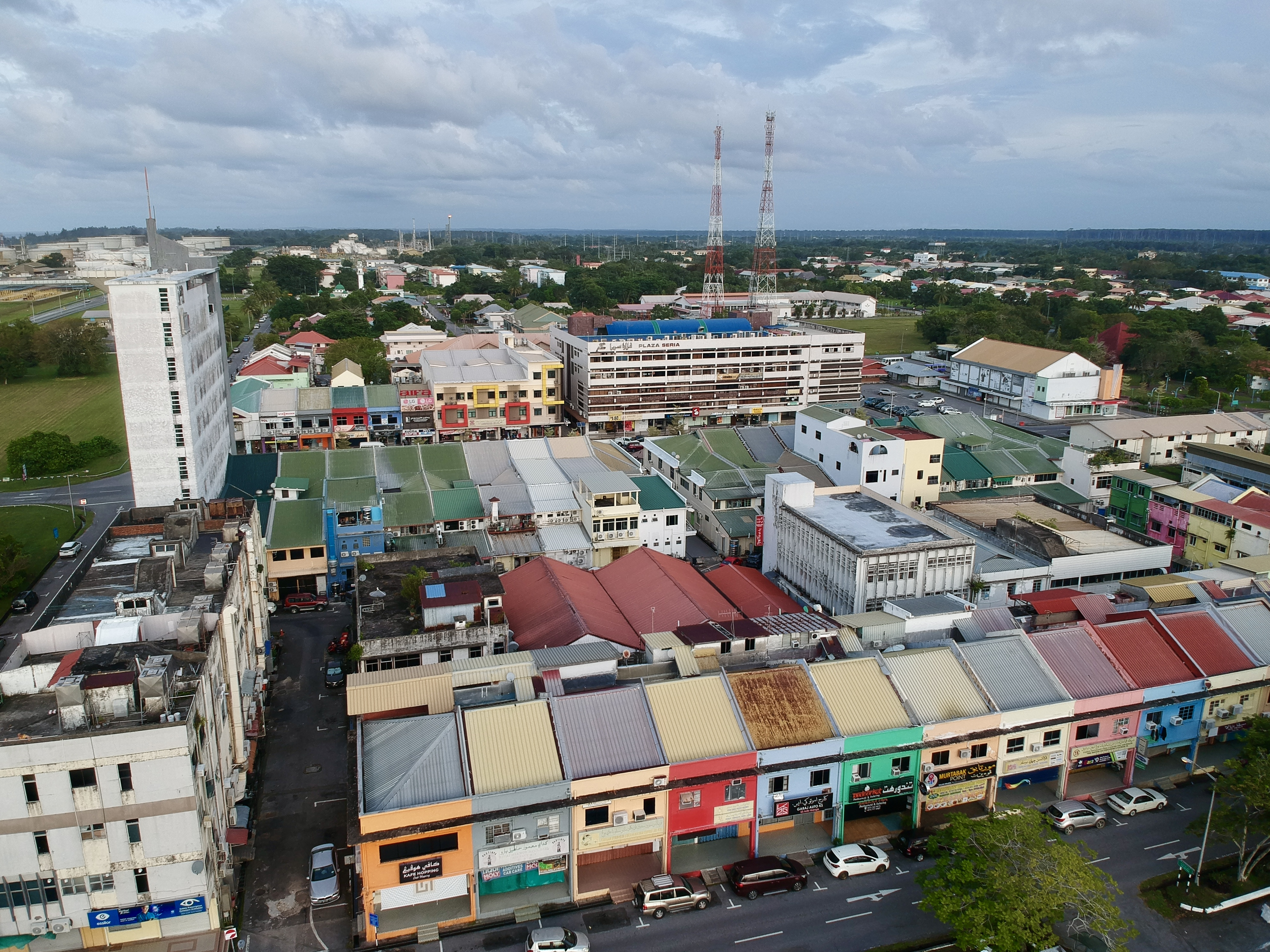
Commercial buildings

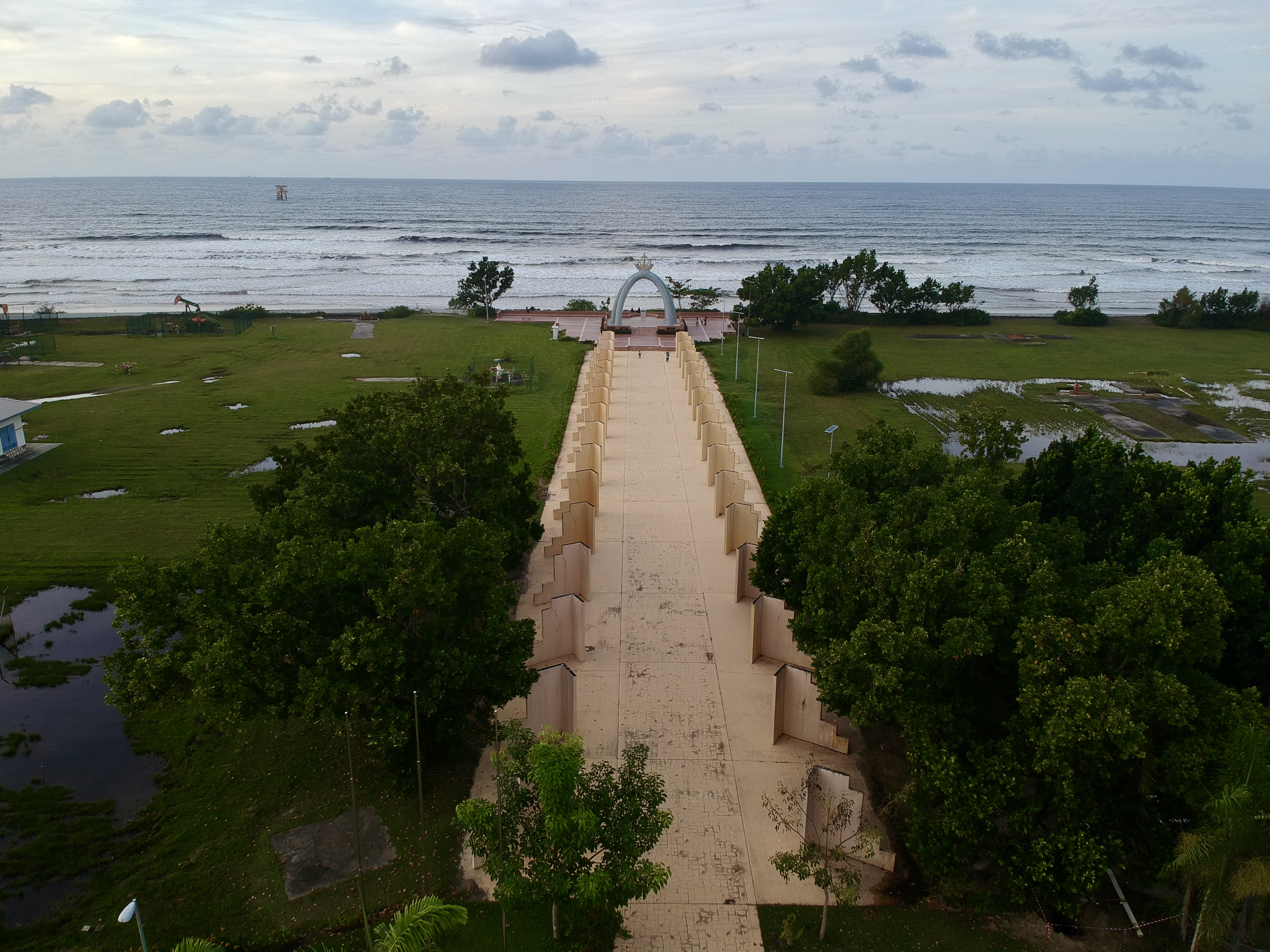
Billionth Barrel Monument

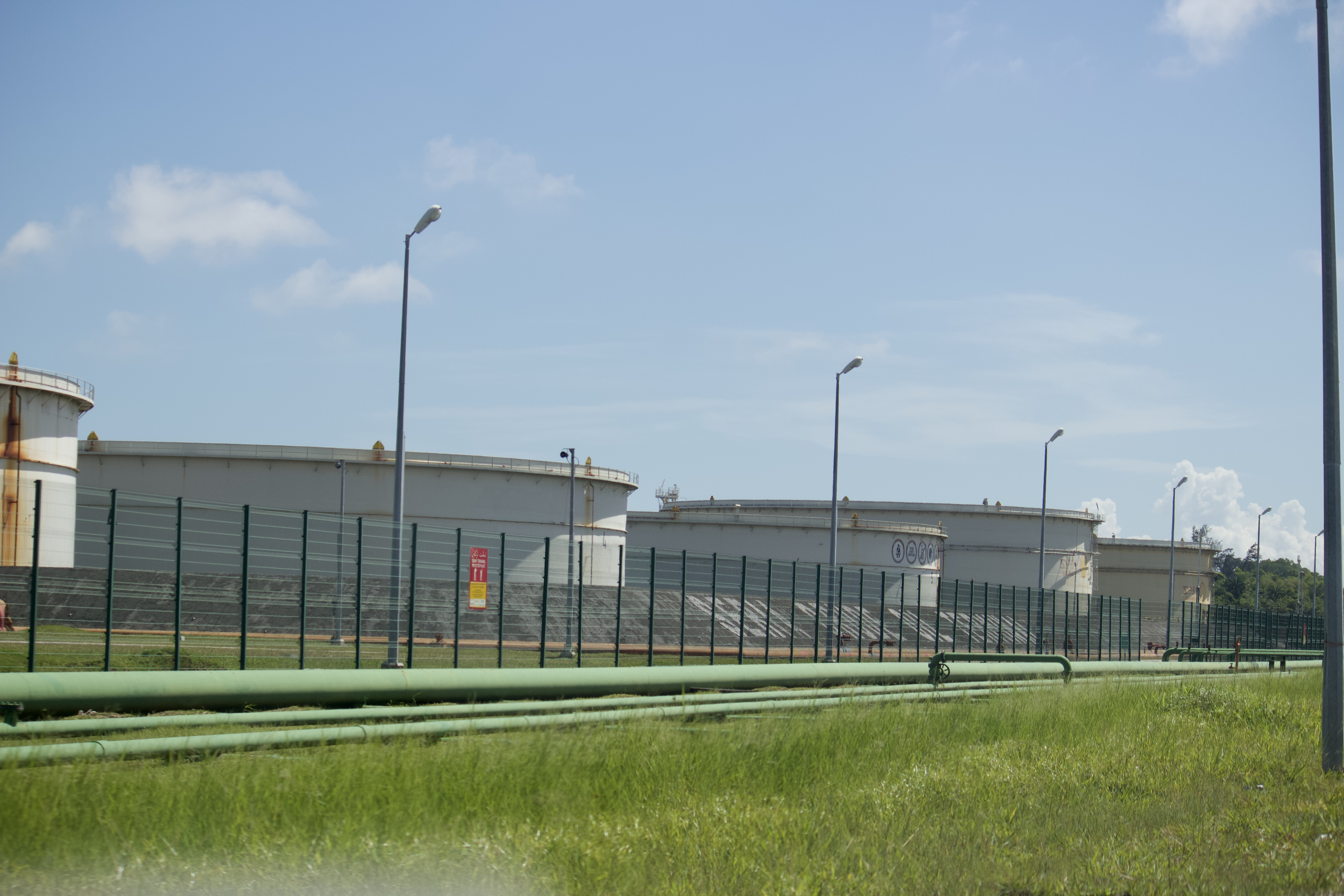
Seria Crude Oil Terminal

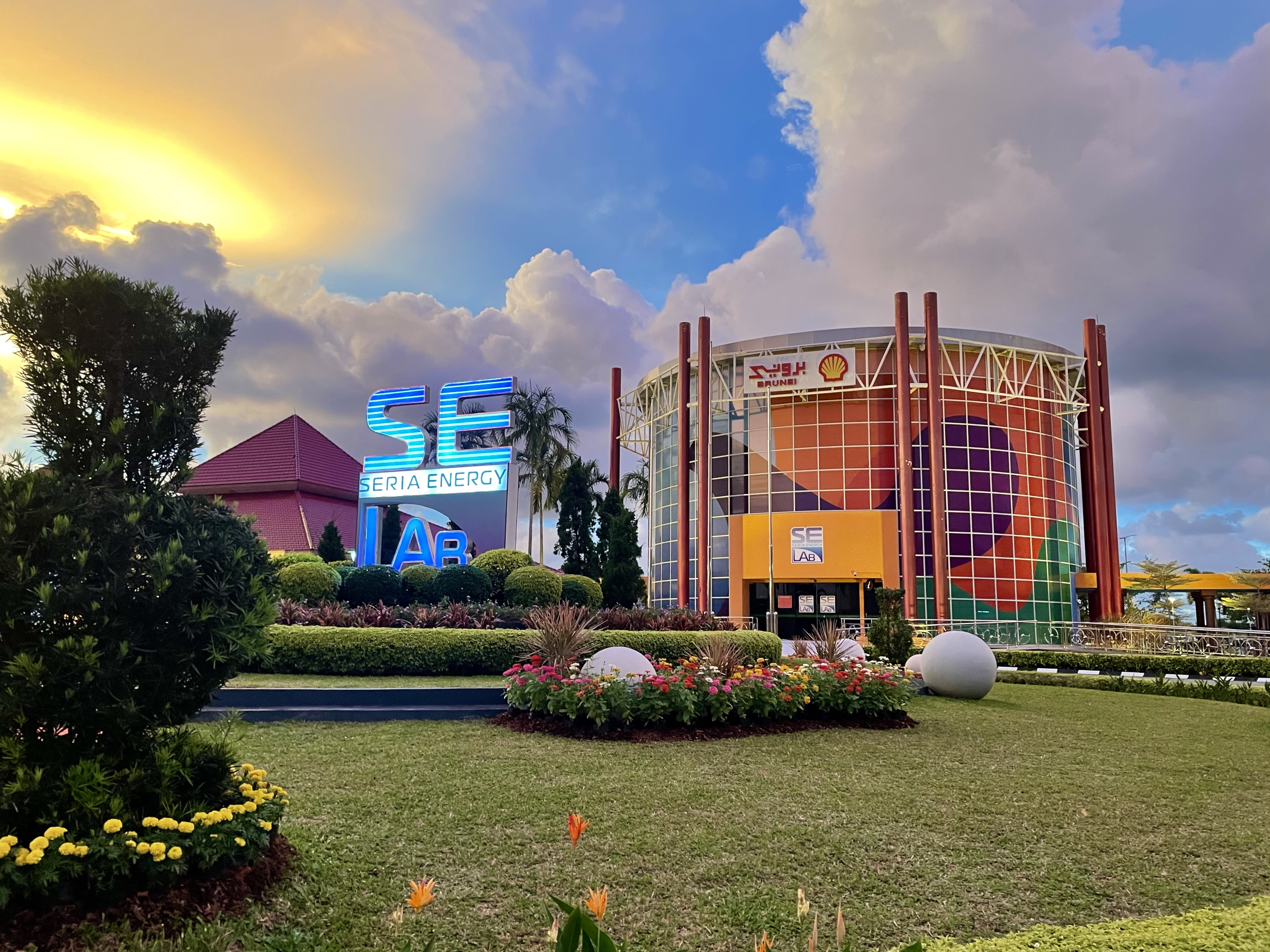
Seria Energy Lab

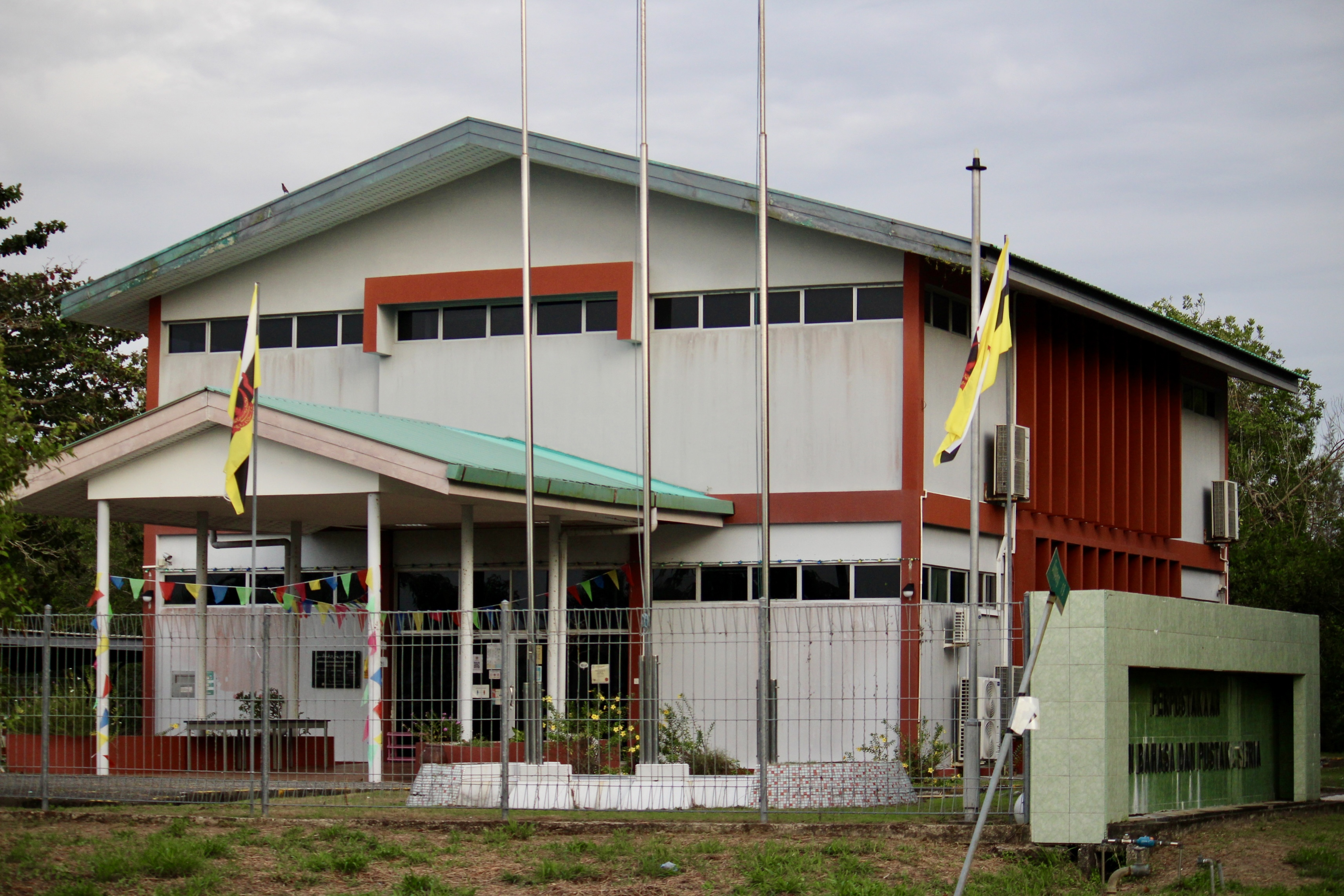
Seria Library

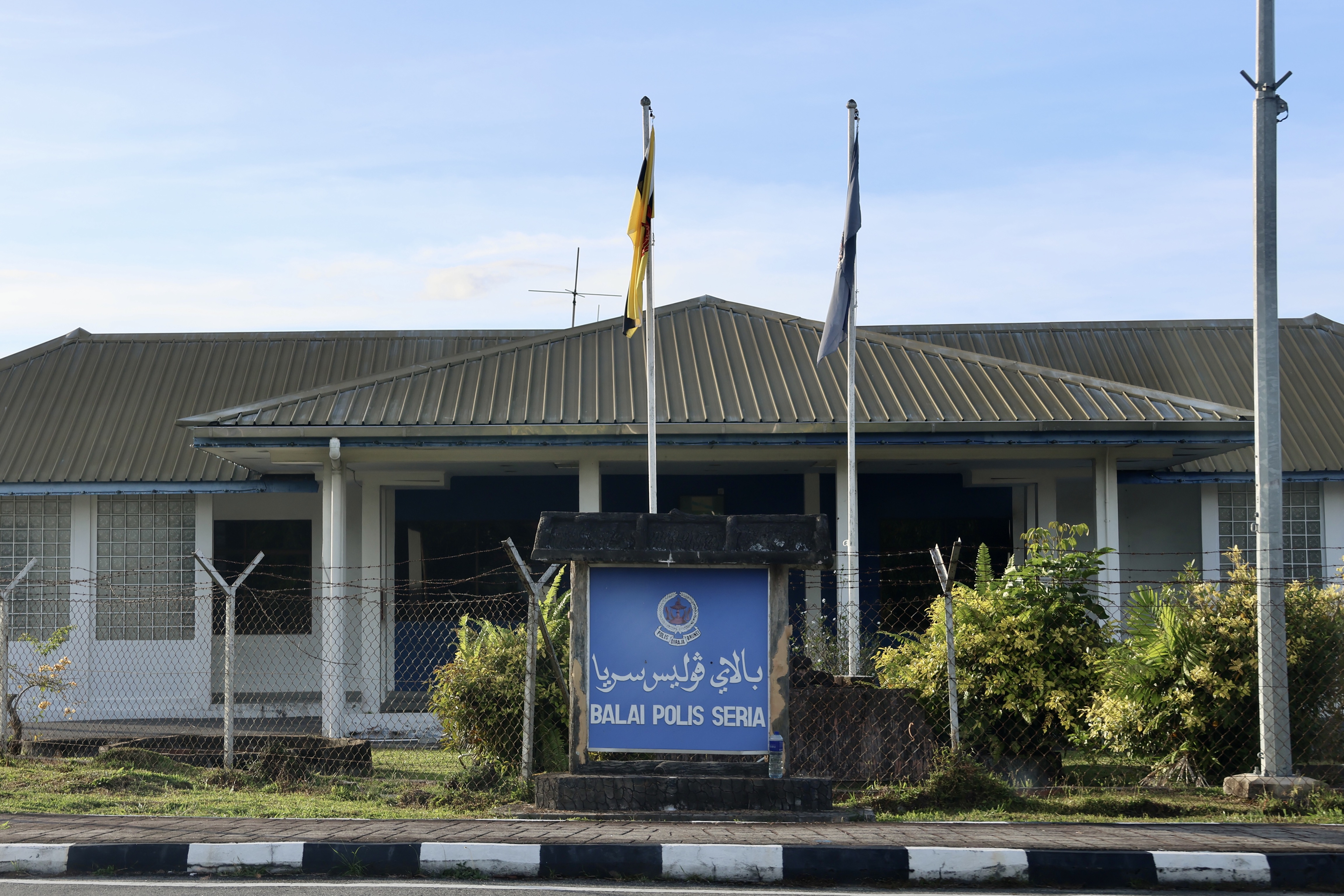
Seria Police Station

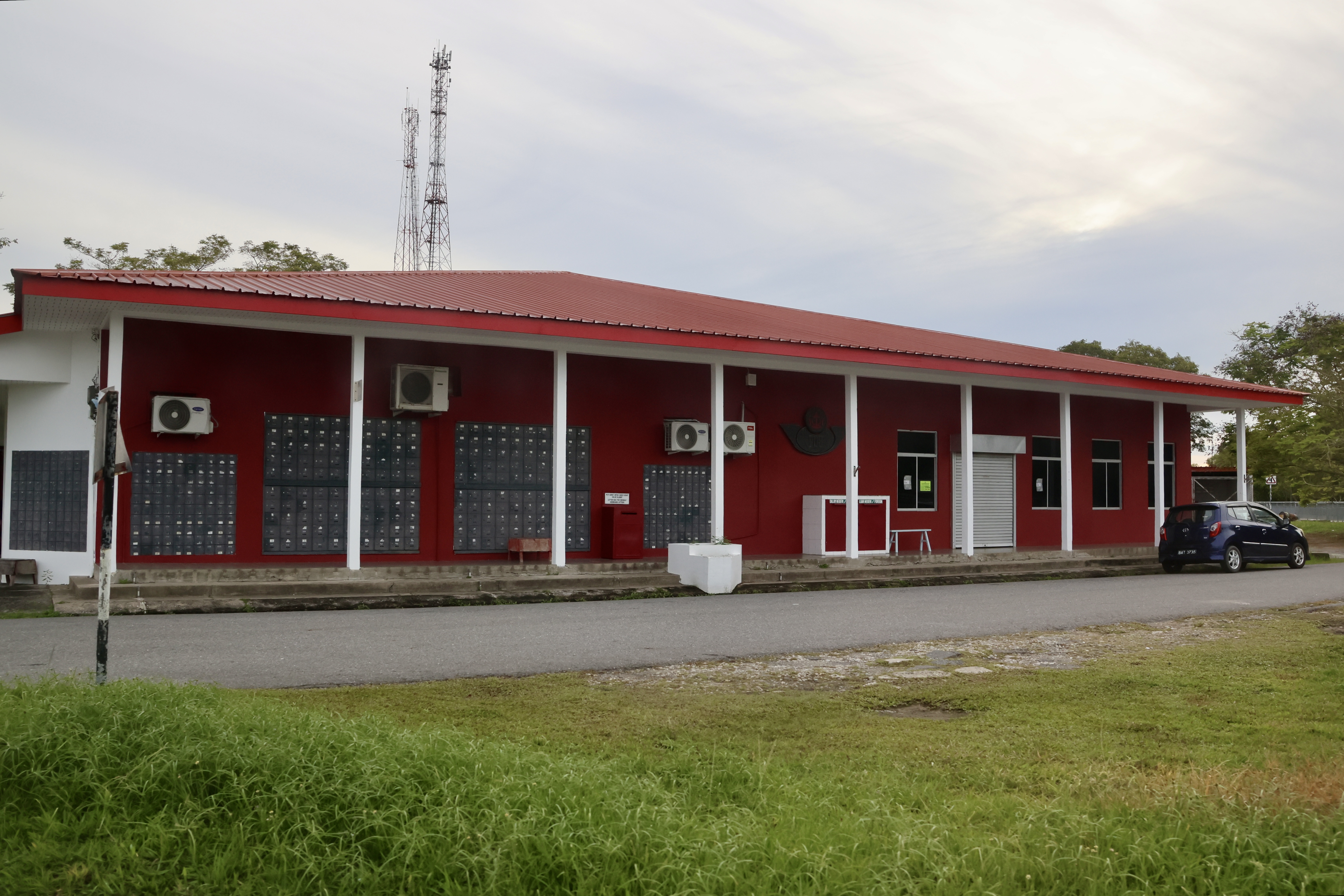
Seria Post Office

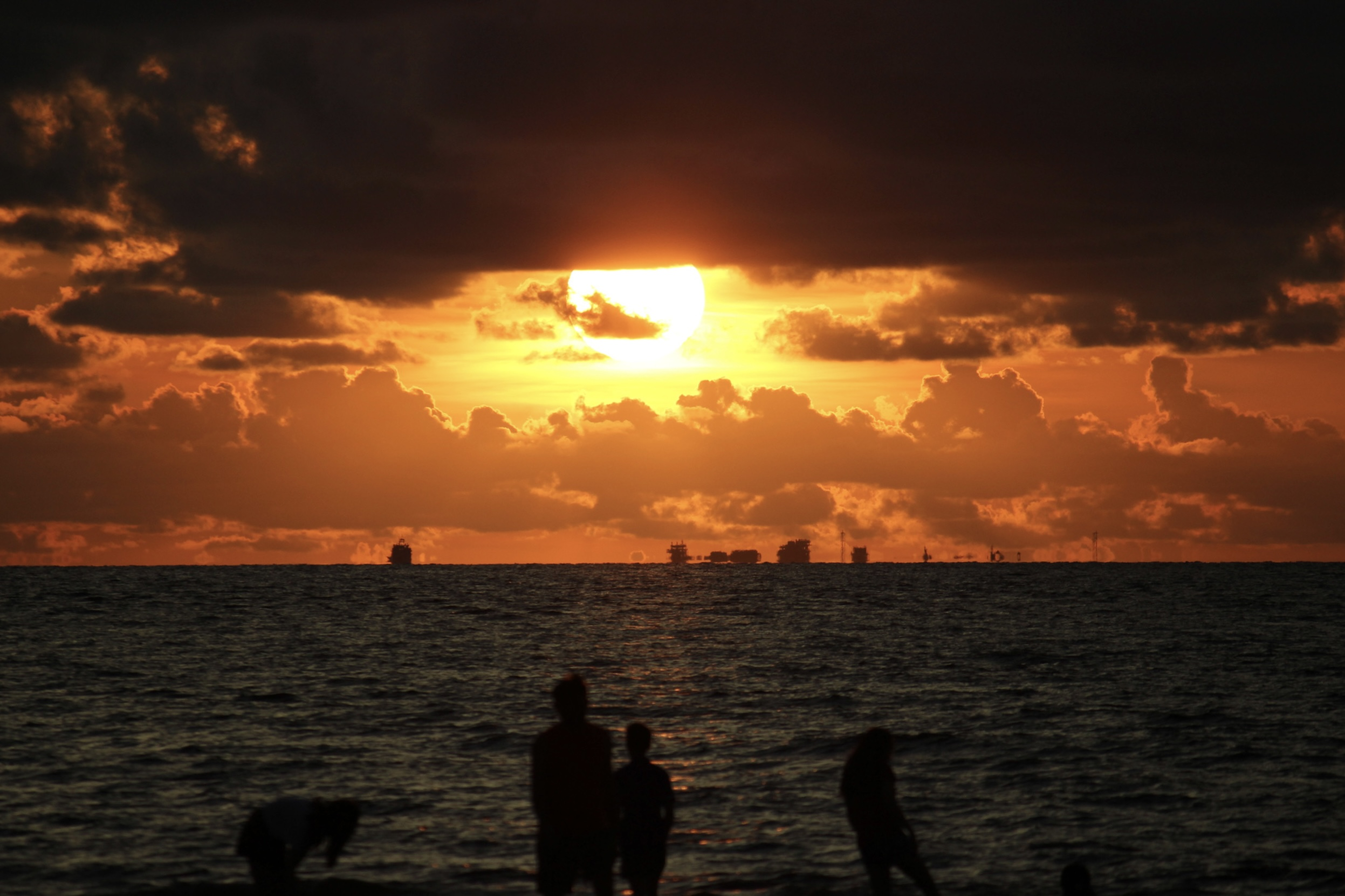
South West Ampa gas field off Seria
