= Kampong Sungai Teraban =

Village in Brunei

Sungai Teraban
- Village
- Kampong Sungai Teraban
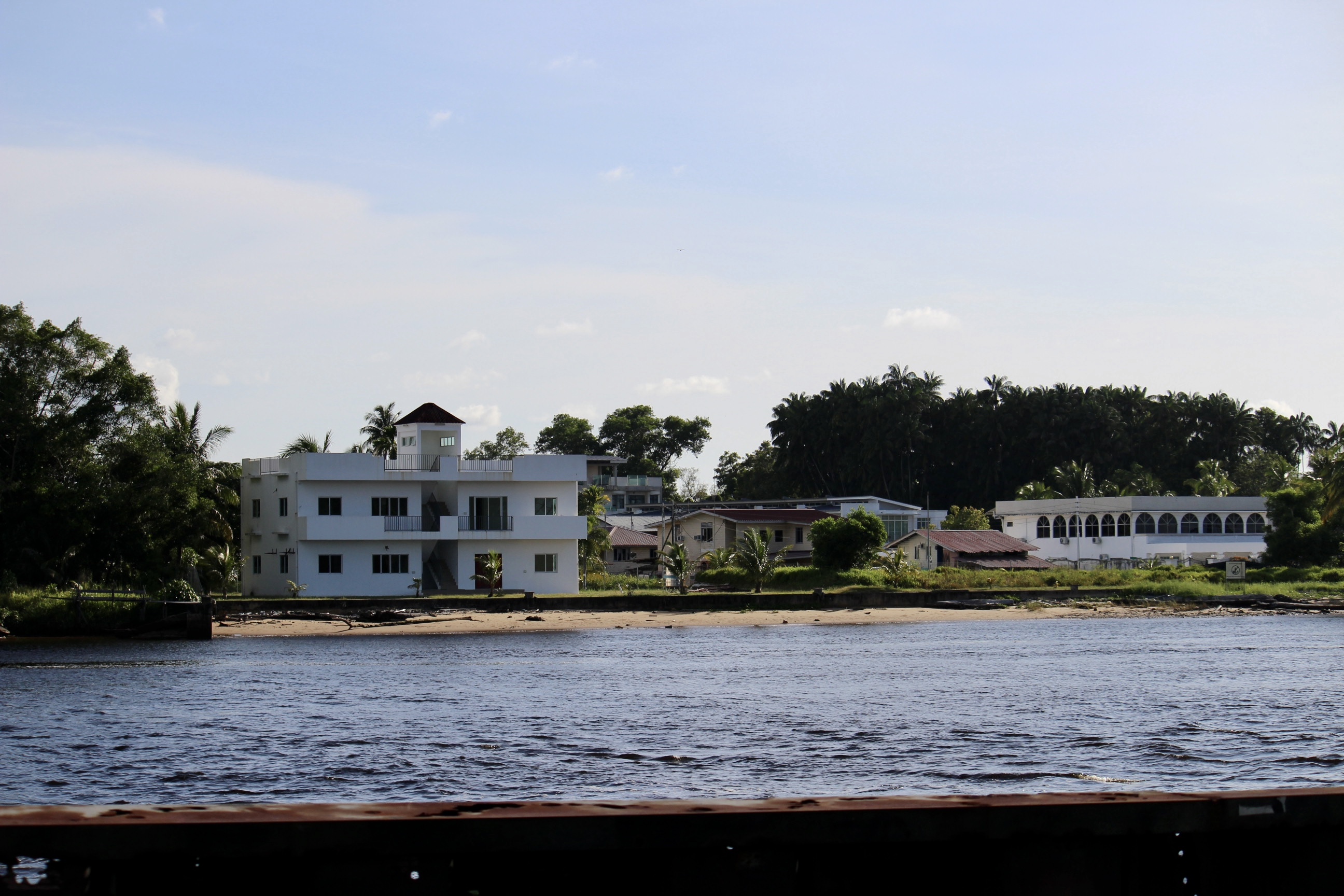
- Houses along the Belait River in 2022

- Location in Brunei
- Coordinates: 4°34′58″N 114°10′40″E
- Country: Brunei
- District: Belait
- Mukim: Kuala Belait

Government
  - Village head: Zaini Kaderi

Area
  - Total: 22 km^{2} (8.5 sq mi)

Population (2016)
  - Total: 1,082
  - Density: 49/km^{2} (130/sq mi)
- Time zone: UTC+8 (BNT)
- Postcode: KA3331
- Website: Official website

Kampong Sungai Teraban (Malay: Kampung Sungai Teraban) is a village in Belait District, Brunei, near the district's principal town Kuala Belait. It has an area of 22 square kilometres (8.5 sq mi); the population was 1,082 in 2016. It is one of the administrative villages within Mukim Kuala Belait.

== Etymology ==
Originally known as Kampong Seberang. The name "Teraban" is believed to have derived from the Belait language-word telabin which means 'a resting or stopping place' — it is believed that the area was once a stopping place for boats and ships on the way upstream to Kuala Balai which was once the administrative centre of what is now Kuala Belait.

The village was inhabited by the Belait people, a mostly fishing tribe. The Kuala Balai administrative centre used to be where the village gets its name, the head of the village claims, and the first settlers came from Melanau, Sarawak, as well as the Belait people, which founded the village. Terabin, a word from the Belait language, means a place to rest and wait for a ship, boat, or boat.

== Geography ==
The village is located at the mouth of the Belait River, and on the opposite bank of the town centre of Kuala Belait. It is also the westernmost settlement in the country, near Sungai Tujoh of the Brunei–Malaysia border. South of the village is the former Kampong Rasau and the Rasau oil field. Kampung Sungai Teraban has an area of 22 square kilometres (8.5 sq mi) starting from the Rasau Bridge Toll to the Sungai Tujoh area.

== Economy ==
Since the village is a fishing village that has been inherited from the past until now and continues to grow into a fishing village until now, the main result of the village is of course fishing and the products they introduce are also based on marine resources such as fish snacks that are developed by the Women's Bureau through the project Satu Kampung Satu Produk (1K1P) in addition to working on dodol.

The Malays, who originate from Melanau, Sarawak and have long held Bruneian citizenship, are the predominant ethnic group in the hamlet, followed by the Chinese and a small number of foreign nationalities, including Indonesians, Thais, Bangladeshis, and Indians. The majority of the people are Muslims. Some fishermen also work for the government, Brunei Shell Petroleum (BSP), and other for-profit organizations in addition to being fishers.

== Demography ==
The majority of the villagers are Muslim and the Malays who come from Melanau, Sarawak and have long been citizens of Brunei live in the village the most, followed by the Chinese and a small number of foreign nationalities such as Indonesia, Thailand, Bangladesh and India. In addition to working as fishermen, some also serve the government, BSP and other private companies.

== Transportation ==
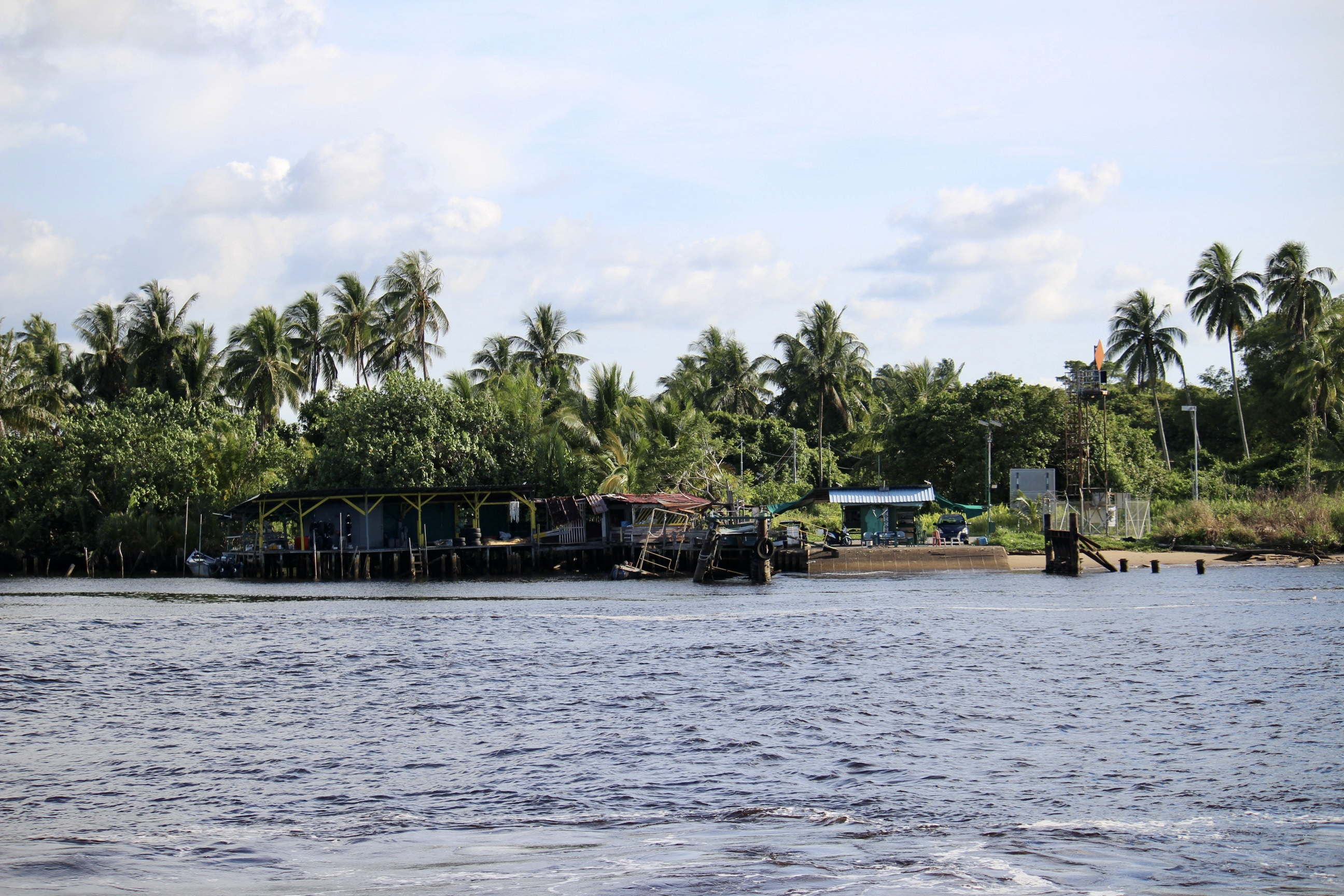
The new (left) and old (right) jetties on the Belait River

=== Road ===
Access to the village from Kuala Belait and elsewhere in the country involves crossing the Belait River. It is currently served by the Rasau Bridge and replaced the ferry service which is now no longer in operation. The two bridges connecting Sungai Teraban and Rasau were completed in October 1969. The bridges are 102 feet (31 m) and 60 feet (18 m), replacing the bailey bridges built by Brunei Shell in 1963. Project costed B$5,214.

=== Water ===
Boat owners in the area will be able to park their vessels at a jetty that has been refurbished after Brunei Shell Petroleum (BSP) gave it back to the neighborhood. The Sungai Teraban jetty currently has steel railings from the ground out to the ocean, a metal platform for small boats to dock on, and a ramp going up to its walkway. The more than 20-year-old jetty is immediately close to the former Sungai Teraban ferry point, where vehicles from Kuala Belait were once conveyed prior to the construction of the Rasau Toll Bridge.

== Infrastructures ==
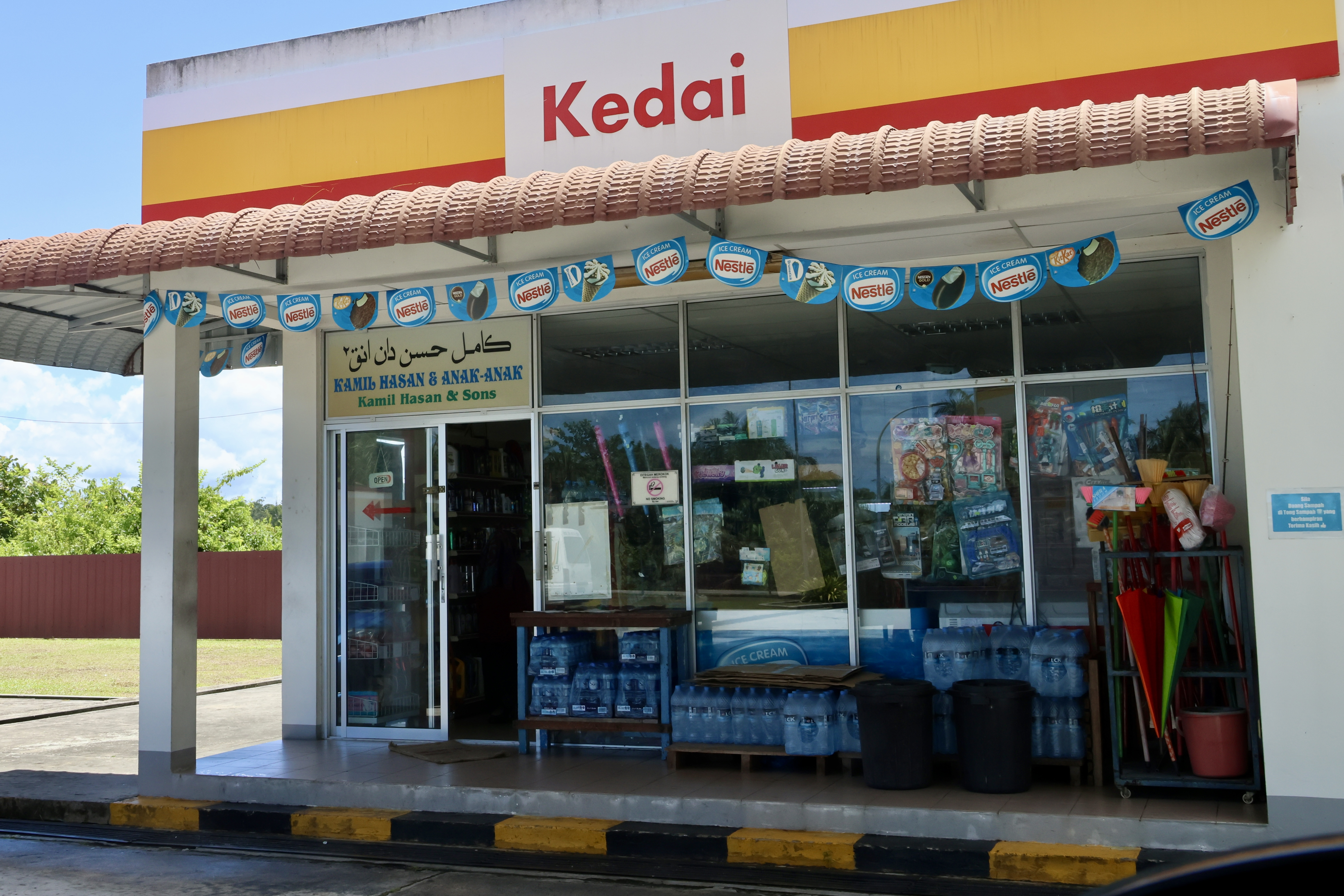
The petrol station in 2023

The first piped water supply was installed in the village in 1963. Previously, the water supply was obtained through rainwater.

The village created the nation's first microwave radio telephone service in 1977. Dato Abdullah Mohammed Jaafar, the district officer, used it for the first time to call the State Secretariat in Bandar Seri Begawan on 18 July 1979. According to telecom officials, the installation process took around three weeks and cost B$200,000.

The village has a petrol station; the Kampong Sungai Teraban Farmers Cooporative's Petrol Station was opened in 2002.

There is a government plan to develop the village into a border town and free trade area in 2006.

Despite having access to a number of basic amenities, the village nevertheless has issues, such as inadequate street lighting, particularly near the mosque, and some lights that are not functioning. Similar to this, numerous roads have been broken, making it easy for villagers' homes and roadways to flood during the rainy season.

=== Housing ===
In 2015, said village head Awang Mohd. Mersidi, the number of residents decreased from 1,300 people to 1,100 people because they have moved to the National Housing Plan (RPN) in Panaga, Lumut and Seria as well as to other districts. Despite this, it is expected that there will be a new influx with the construction of flats and apartments built in the catchment area of the village.

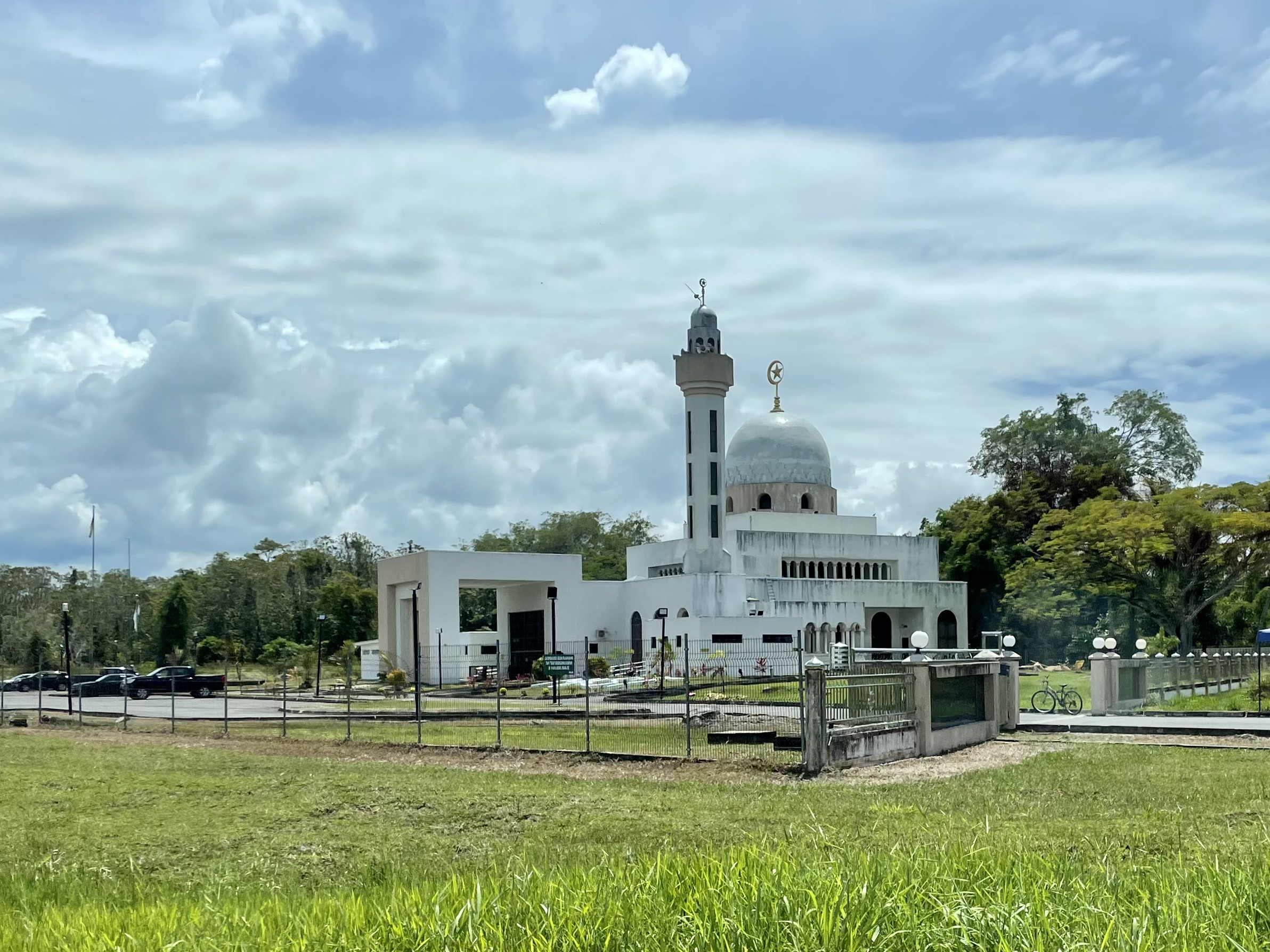
Sungai Teraban Mosque

=== Education ===
The local primary school is Sungai Teraban Primary School (Sekolah Rendah Sungai Teraban). A temporary building was built in 1968 by the villagers on a 5-acre (2.0 ha) site. It was then replaced by a permanent building which was inaugurated in 1983. It also houses a sekolah ugama ("religious school" i.e. school for the country's Islamic religious primary education).

=== Religion ===
The village mosque is Kampong Sungai Teraban Mosque. It was completed in 1994 at a cost of B$266,378 and can accommodate 1,400 worshippers.

The balai ibadat (place of worship) was officially opened by Pengiran Idris bin Pengiran Temenggong Pengiran Haji Muhammad, the Belait District Officer, on 7 December 1980, in conjunction with the celebration of the New Year. Initially, the construction was led by Awang Kassim bin Johan, who was then the Assistant District Officer of Belait. The project was also encouraged by Al-Ustaz Haji Abdul Ghani bin Pehin Datu Pekerma Dato Paduka Haji Abdul Rahim, the administrator of the Belait District Office. The construction was completed on 30 November 1980, with a budget of B$15,000.00. This place of worship provides facilities for the villagers and surrounding communities to perform congregational prayers and conduct religious gatherings, while also promoting the teachings of Islam in general.

=== Recreation ===
Near the community hall, three huts have been built which were jointly developed by the Sungai Teraban Village Consultative Council (MPK) with the cooperation of the Belait District Department, which are used as a place to rest and carry out any village projects and activities as well as to brighten up the community hall which is the main focus of further strengthening the unity of the village community.

State Secretary Pengiran Muhammad Yusuf, formally opened the balai raya (community centre) in Sungai Teraban on 16 June 1966. The centre was created to serve as a location for welfare events and community gatherings. He called on the populace to cultivate a sense of solidarity and pride in Brunei as their country. Pengiran Abdul Momin Ismail, the district officer of Belait, also discussed the increasing number of celebrations nationwide and their significance for community development. He commended the infrastructure upgrades, water supply, and energy, saying that these initiatives show the government's dedication to improving the welfare of the populace.
