= Kampong Pandan =

Kampong Pandan may refer to:

- Kampong Pandan, Brunei
- Kampung Pandan, a village in Kuala Lumpur, Malaysia
