= Kampong Pandan, Brunei =

Settlement in Brunei

Pandan
- Residential area
- Kampong Pandan
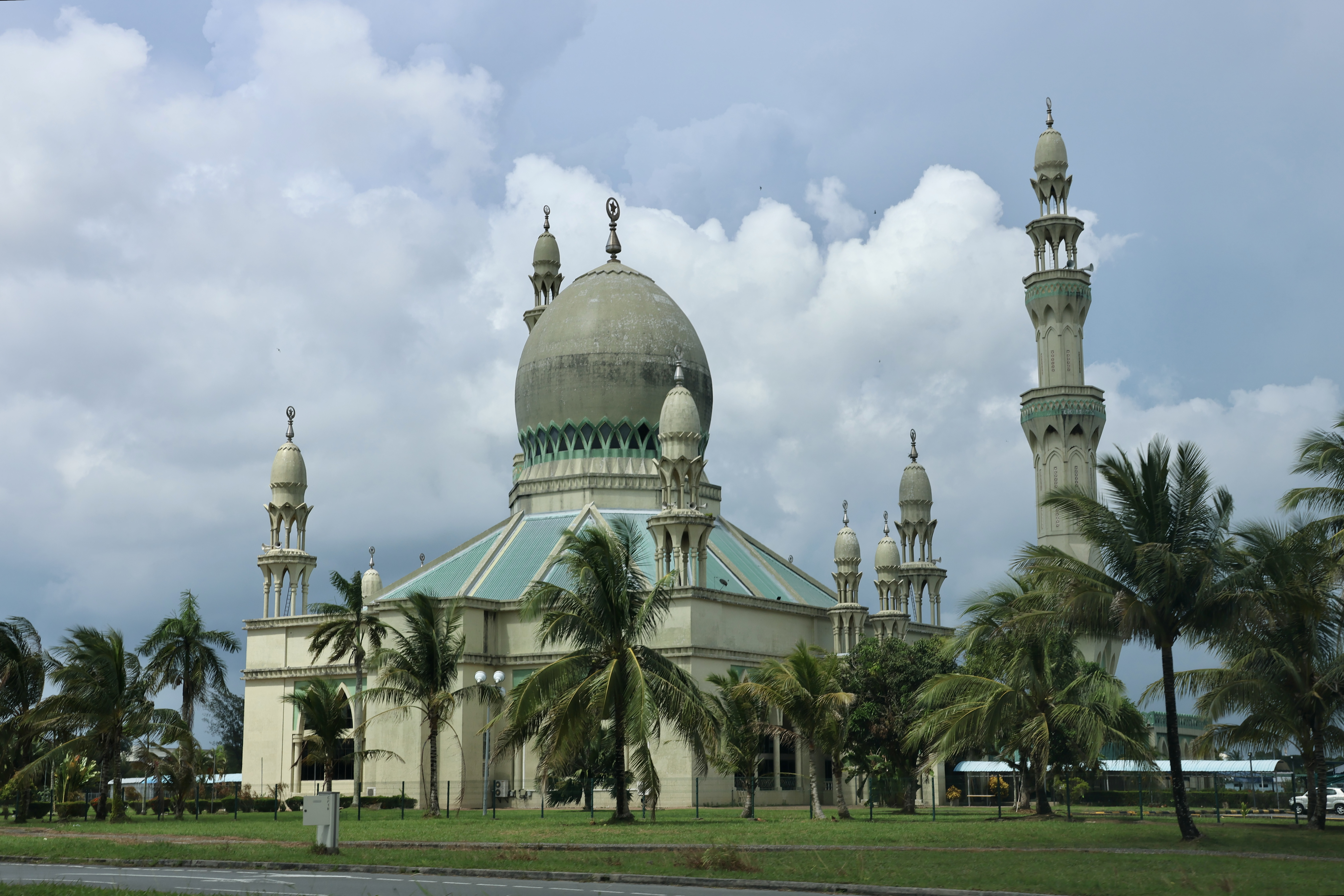
- Kampong Pandan Mosque

- Location in Brunei
- Coordinates: 4°35′13″N 114°13′55″E
- Country: Brunei
- District: Belait
- Mukim: Kuala Belait

Government
  - Village head: Abdul Aziz Seri (Area A); Rawinyani Morney (Area B); Affandy Damit (Area C, D & E); Hazrul Faizal (Area F)

Population (2016) (Note: See Administration section.)
  - Total: 16,227
- Time zone: UTC+8 (BNT)

Kampong Pandan (Malay: Kampung Pandan) or simply known as Pandan, is a residential area in Kuala Belait, the principal town of Belait District, Brunei. It has a population of around 16,200 in 2016. It encompasses a housing estate of the country's National Housing Scheme.

== Etymology ==
Kampong Pandan comes from the same name in Malay which translates as 'Pandan Village'. It is probably named after pandan, a tropical plant known for its aromatic leaves.

== Geography ==
Kampong Pandan is surrounded by the South China Sea to the north, Panaga to the east, Mumong to the south and Kuala Belait proper to the west.

== Administration ==
For census and other administrative purposes, Kampong Pandan has been divided into three villages (kampung):

Village	Population (2016)	Postcode
Kampong Pandan 'A'	5,493	KA1931
Kampong Pandan 'B'	4,229	KA2031
Kampong Pandan 'C'	6,505	KA2131
Total	16,227	-

Each village is assigned a village head (ketua kampung). All of the administrative villages of Kampong Pandan are under Mukim Kuala Belait, a mukim subdivision of Belait District. The villages are also part of the municipal area of Kuala Belait.

== Demography ==
The population in Kampong Pandan 'B' almost reached 6,000 people. Of that number, more than 400 people received old-age pensions, 22 people received welfare assistance, 10 people received assistance for the insane and one was visually impaired. The population consists of various communities such as Puak Belait, Tutong, Kedayan, Malay, Iban, Chinese and also Indian. Residents living in Kampong Pandan 'B' work with the government and private sectors.

== Economy ==
Realizing the potential that can be obtained through the fertilizer in question as well as the benefits provided by the use of the fertilizer on crops, the Majlis Perundingan Kampung (MPK) Pandan 'A' has made it a product of the village's economy under the One Village One Product (1K1P) program. MPK Pandan 'A' Economic Project Chairman, Awang Haji Ali bin Mat explained, he learned the technique to produce composted vermi-fertilizer from Selangor, Malaysia by just communicating over the phone with one of the experts in the preservation of worms to produce composted vermi-fertilizer.

From an economic point of view, the residents of Kampong Pandan 'B' also run a variety of small businesses to support and supplement their respective sources of sustenance, such as setting up shops that sell necessities, creating restaurants, car washing services, selling rice Katok with various flavors, providing a place to rent wedding dresses and many more. Doing business like this will help improve the national economy by reducing the unemployment rate in the area.

== Infrastructure ==
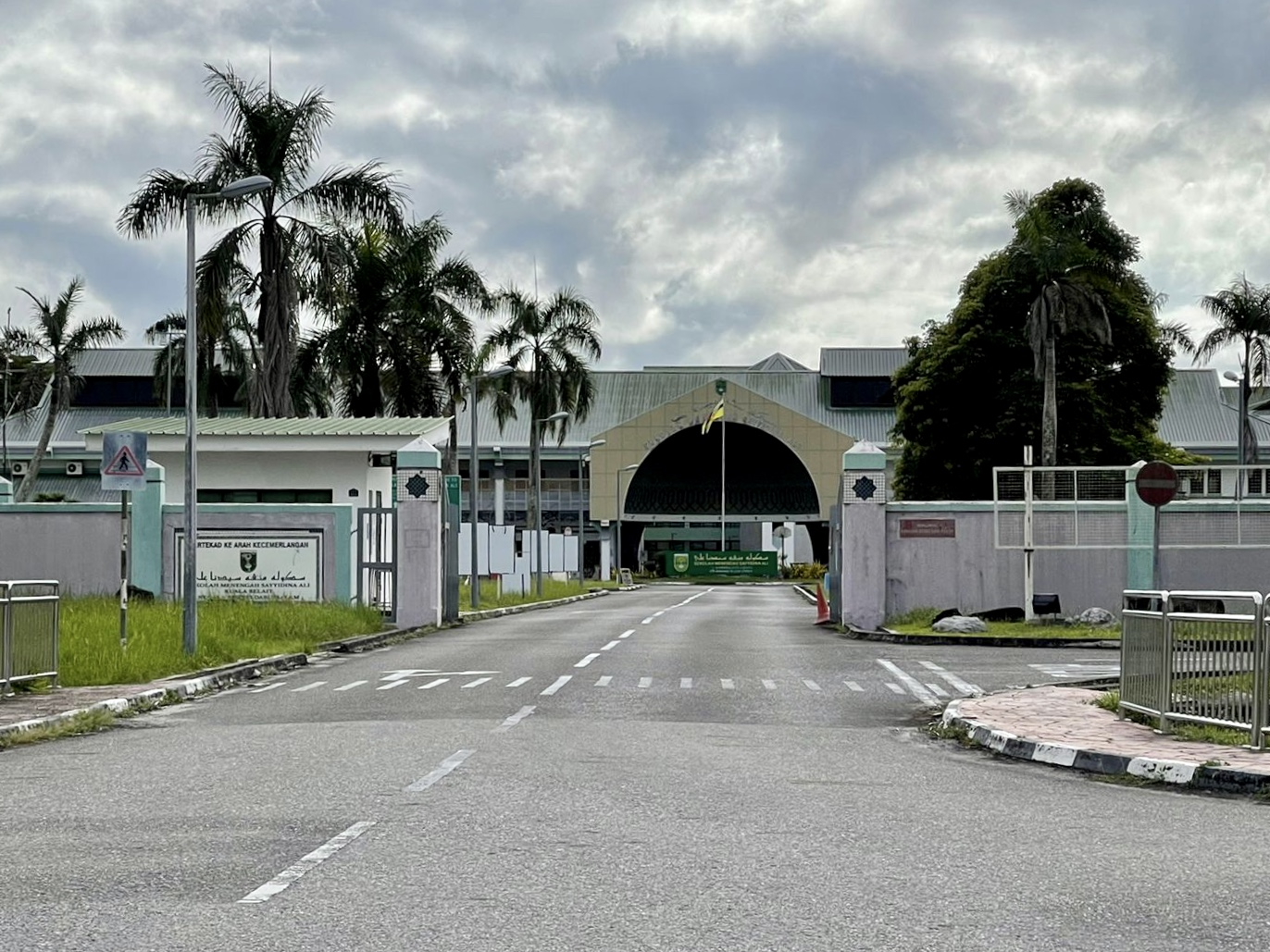
Sayyidina Ali Secondary School

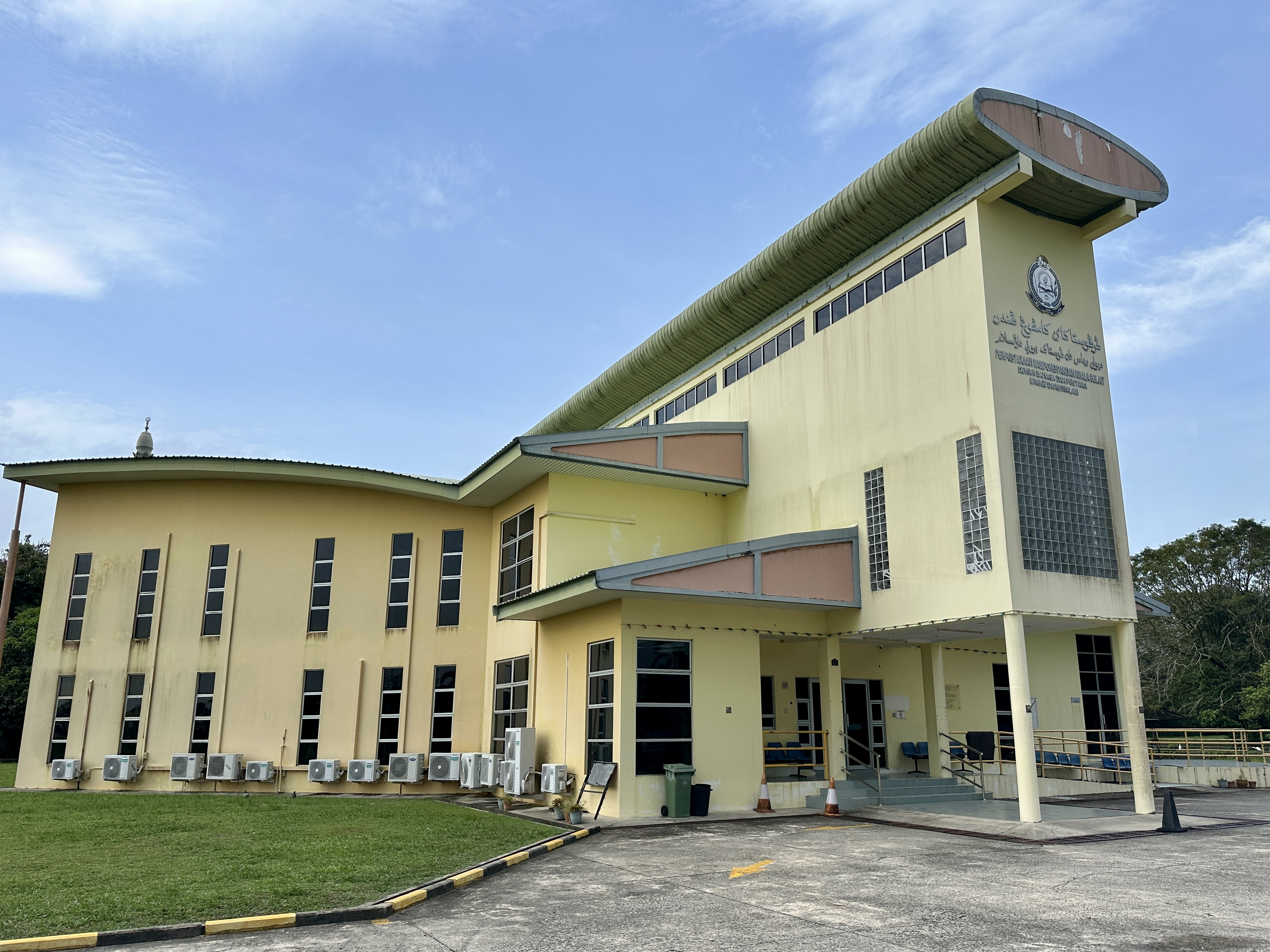
Kampong Pandan Library

=== Education ===
Kampong Pandan is home to two of Kuala Belait's government primary schools, namely Pengiran Setia Jaya Pengiran Abdul Momin Primary School and Paduka Seri Begawan Sultan Omar Ali Saifuddien Primary School.

Kampong Pandan is also home to two of the town's government secondary schools, namely Pengiran Jaya Negara Pengiran Haji Abu Bakar Secondary School and Sayyidina Ali Secondary School. Pengiran Jaya Negara Pengiran Haji Abu Bakar Secondary School also houses a counterpart of Paduka Seri Begawan Sultan Science College, the country's secondary school which specialises in science and mathematics. Meanwhile, Sayyidina Ali Secondary School formerly housed the district's sole sixth form college; the latter now has a dedicated building located in the adjacent neighbourhood Mumong named Belait Sixth Form Centre.

Each of Pengiran Setia Jaya Pengiran Abdul Momin Primary School, Pengiran Jaya Negara Pengiran Haji Abu Bakar Secondary School and Sayyidina Ali Secondary School also house an ugama school, the school for the country's Islamic religious primary education.

One of the two post-secondary vocational schools in Kuala Belait, Kemuda Institute, is also located in Kampong Pandan.

=== Miscellaneous ===
Kampong Pandan encompasses the public housing estate RPN Kampong Pandan.

Kampong Pandan Mosque is the local mosque. It was opened in 1996 and can accommodate 1,100 worshippers.

Kampong Pandan Library is the local public library and operated by Dewan Bahasa dan Pustaka Brunei. It was inaugurated on 3 May 2006. The library houses a dedicated reading collection pertaining to Brunei Shell Petroleum, the country's primary oil and gas company.

== Achievements ==
Kampong Pandan 'B' also received several village achievements, namely in 2014, Kampong Pandan 'B' won the cleanliness and beauty award for the National Housing Plan area in conjunction with Rancangan Perumahan Negara Sempena Hari Mesra Pelanggan 2014 from the Ministry of Development and the departments under it that show cleanliness is one of the important things applied to the residents of Kampung Pandan 'B' so that the environment is always clean. Kampung Pandan 'B' also won the Pertandingan Dikir Peringkat Negara Bagi Mukim-Mukim Tahun 2015, which was the championship for the men's team while for the women's team they got third place.
