= Mumong =

Settlement in Brunei

- village
- Kampung Mumong
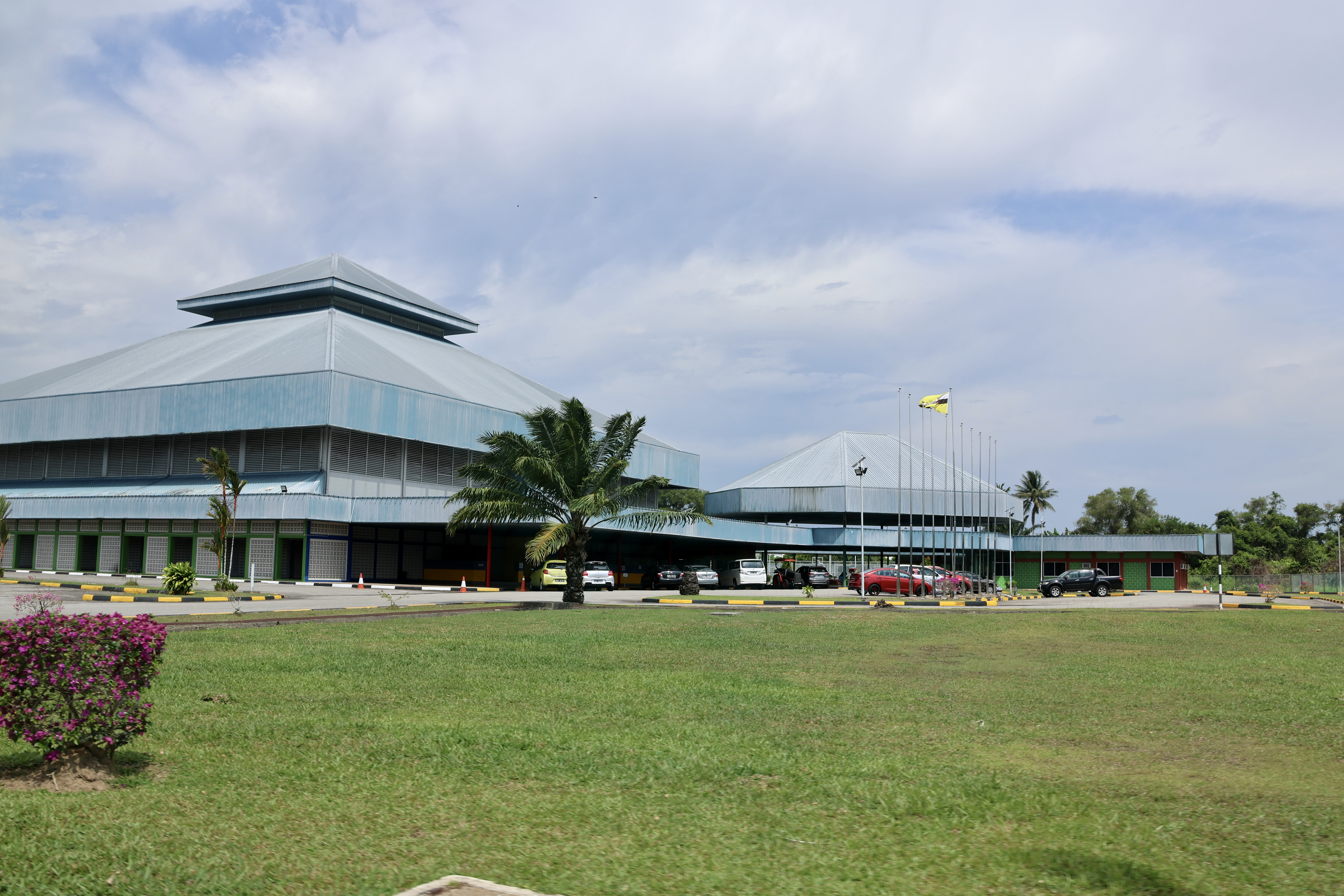
- Mumong Sports Complex

- Location in Brunei
- Coordinates: 4°34′54″N 114°14′22″E
- Country: Brunei Darussalam
- District: Belait
- Mukim: Kuala Belait
- Sub-areas: List: Mumong 'A'; Mumong 'B'

Government
  - Village head: Yusof Dulamin (Area A & B); Abdul Afiq (Area C)

Area
  - Total: 14,785 km^{2} (5,709 sq mi)

Population
  - Total: 1,000 (estimated)
- Postcodes: KA1531, KA1731

Kampong Mumong (Malay: Kampung Mumong), or simply known as Mumong, is a residential suburb of Kuala Belait, the principal town of Belait District, in Brunei Darussalam. It comprises the original Mumong settlement, as well as the Mumong public housing estate of the Landless Indigenous Citizens' Housing Scheme. However, it officially consists of two village sub-divisions, namely Mumong 'A' and Mumong 'B', which are under the mukim of Kuala Belait.

== Etymology ==
The name Kampong Mumong is believed to come from a type of forest yam plant called Mumong. Many of these plants grow along the tributary (Mumong River), which in the past, was often used as a base to place boats for the purpose of going upstream or downstream to the sea.

== Geography ==
Mumong is located in the eastern part of Kuala Belait. It is surrounded by the suburb of Pandan to the north and north-west, the settlement of Panaga to east, and Belait River to the south. Mumong comprises the original Mumong village as well as Mumong Landless Indigenous Citizens' Housing Scheme; they make up the eastern and western parts of Mumong respectively.

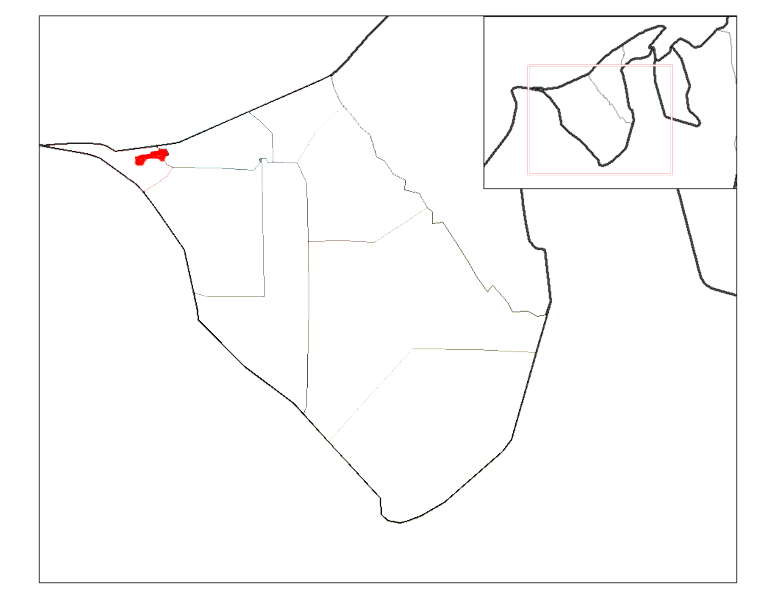
Mumong location in Mukim Belait.

== History ==
Mumong was a small Malay village on the banks of the Belait River further upstream from Kuala Belait on the way to Kuala Balai. The development of Kuala Belait at the turn of the century as the district capital, and the construction of Jalan Singa Menteri and Jalan Tengah to like Kuala Belait to Seria saw the village grow south of Jalan Singa Menteri to become mainly a commuter community serving Kuala Belait and Seria towns. The construction of the Seria Bypass in the 1980s further encouraged more settlement of the area as it provided a second link from the village to Kuala Belait and Seria.

The government of Brunei has also continued to improve the area with the construction of the Mumong Resettlement Area, a Landless Housing Scheme area located to the west of the kampong. Other infrastructure constructed in the kampong includes the Mumong Youth Centre and Sports Complex in the 1990s, which also serves the communities in the vicinity of Kuala Belait and Panaga, and the Kuala Belait Sewerage Treatment plant.

Mumong also lends its name to the Mumong Telephone exchange area, although the physical location of the exchange is in Kampong Pandan.

== Administration ==
The area of Mumong is officially administered as two villages, namely Mumong 'A' and Mumong 'B' (formerly known as Mumong Utara and Mumong Selatan respectively), which are the third- and lowest-level administrative divisions of Brunei. They are among the sub-divisions within Kuala Belait, a mukim (sub-district) in Belait District. Mumong 'A' comprises the Mumong public housing estate, as well as the nearby government residential area; Mumong 'B' makes up the Mumong village settlement. The two areas are also designated as postcode areas, thus having the postcodes KA1531 and KA1731 respectively.

The community of each village sub-division is headed by a village head (Malay: ketua kampung). However, at present the village head position for Mumong 'B' is vacant, thus in the interim it is administered by the village head of Mumong 'A', and the position is currently held by Mohd Yusof bin Dulamin.

Mumong has also been incorporated into the municipality of Kuala Belait. It comprises the entire Mumong 'A' and parts of Mumong 'B'.

== Demography ==
As of 2018, the village has a population of approximately 9,637 people, namely 5,289 males and 4,378 females, consisting of multiple races, tribes and religions.

== Economy ==
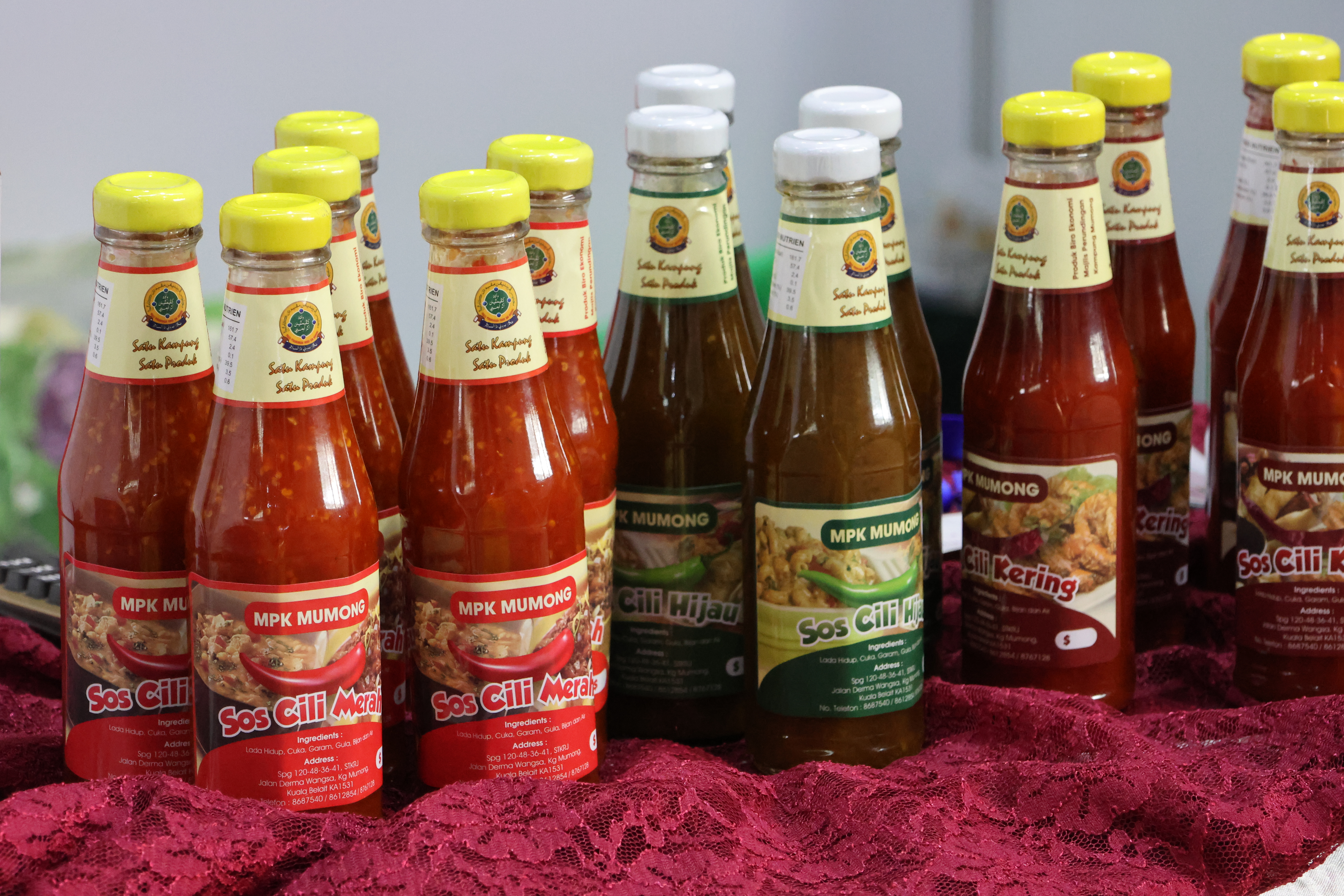
On sale at BRIDEX International Conference Centre 2023.

Like other villages in the country, the Members of the Majlis Perundingan Kampung (MPK) Mumong 'A' and Mumong 'B' joined hands to implement several projects under the One Village One Product Programme (1K1P) such as producing chili sauce, jam, baulu, cordel drink, marble cake, and other sweets. In this implementation, the MPK Mumong Women's Bureau is responsible for promoting the product to the public. The special features of their chili sauce products compared to foreign products, according to Dayang Hajah Julia, there is not much difference between MPK Mumong's chili sauce and other chili sauces, but that their chili sauce is produced by themselves without the help of certain machines, while foreign products may processed using special machines.

The Jem dan Jus Rosella economic project was launched on 22 September 2010, by more than 27 participants, with a total capital of BND$270, which is by using the equal collection method of BND$10 per person. In order to obtain a continuous supply of Rosella fruit (Hibiscus sabdariffa), MPK Mumong has already planted Rosella fruit trees in groups in the yard of the project members, in the MPK activity centre and in the yard of the villagers.

== Transportation ==
=== Land ===
Most of the roads within the kampong is surfaced. However, not all the roads are level, to encourage effective drainage during a downpour. The main road passing through the heart of the old village is Jalan Mumong, although this road has been bisected into two by the Seria Bypass. The Seria Bypass and Jalan Singa Menteri links Mumong west to Kuala Belait, and onwards to Miri in Malaysia; and east to Seria, onwards to Tutong and Bandar Seri Begawan.

A road connects Mumong to Kuala Balai; this road bears the name of Jalan Mumong - Kuala Balai, and this is the only road linking Kuala Balai to the rest of the country. This road was only surfaced in the 1990s, and has since seen a large number of industrial developments at the Mumong end. There are no public buses serving the Mumong area.

=== Water ===
There are no ferry services, river services, or port services in Mumong. The nearest port is in neighbouring Kampong Sungai Duhon to the west along the Belait River, and the nearest deep-water port in Brunei is Muara Port.

=== Air ===
There are no airports in Mumong. Commercial travellers would have to travel to either Bandar Seri Begawan or Miri to take a commercial flight.

== Infrastructure ==
=== Education ===
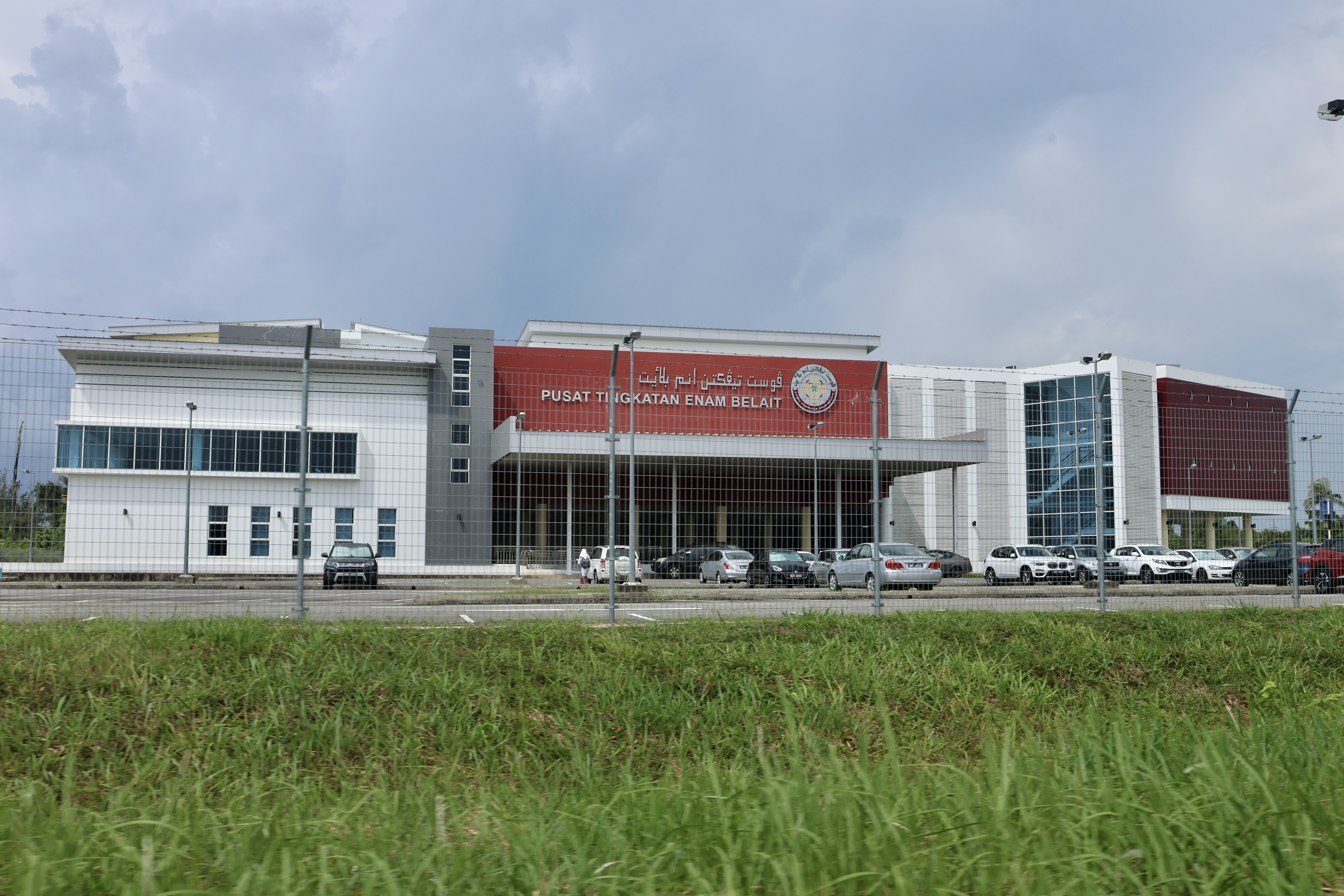
Belait Sixth Form Centre.

- Belait Sixth Form Centre (PTEB)
- Belait Arabic School (SAB)

=== Housing ===
Mumong Landless Indigenous Citizens' Housing Scheme (Malay: Skim Tanah Kurnia Rakyat Jati Mumong) is the public housing estate in Mumong, and one of such estates in the country under the programme of its namesake, which is a government housing programme specifically for the rakyat jati or the indigenous citizens of Brunei.

=== Miscellaneous ===
Mumong Sports Complex serves as the main public venue for sports and recreational activities in Mumong and the area around the vicinity of Kuala Belait. It contains a running track, a swimming pool, various sports courts and other facilities.

== Achievements ==
The village was selected to participate in the 2009 Outstanding Village Award Program organized by the Ministry of Home Affairs where Kampong Mumong was among the 15 villages selected for the final stage by highlighting chili sauce products.

== Notable people ==
- Said Abdullah (1921-2011), penghulu and nobleman

== See also ==
- Kampong Pandan, Brunei
- Kuala Belait
