= Mukim Seria =

Mukim of Brunei

- Mukim
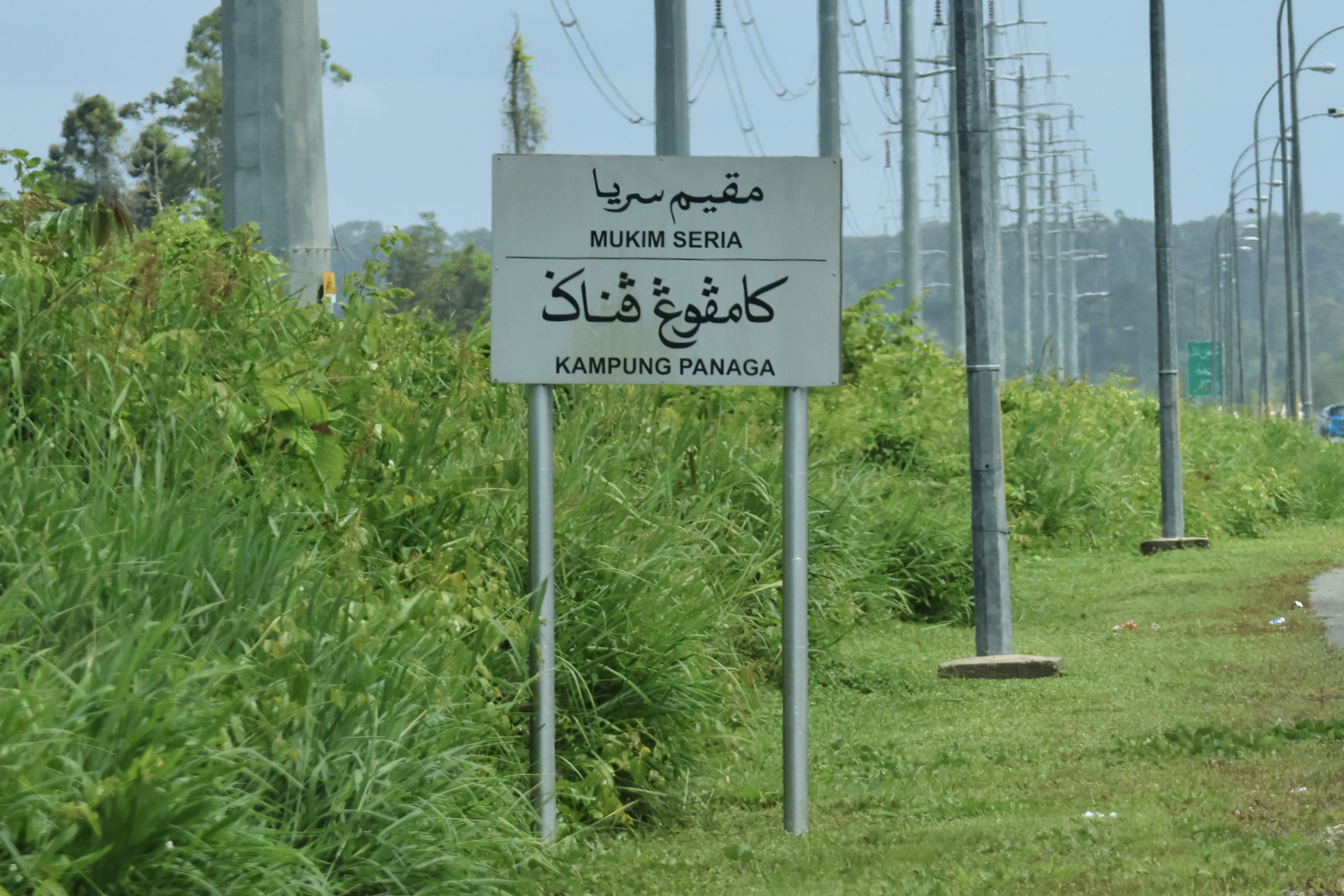
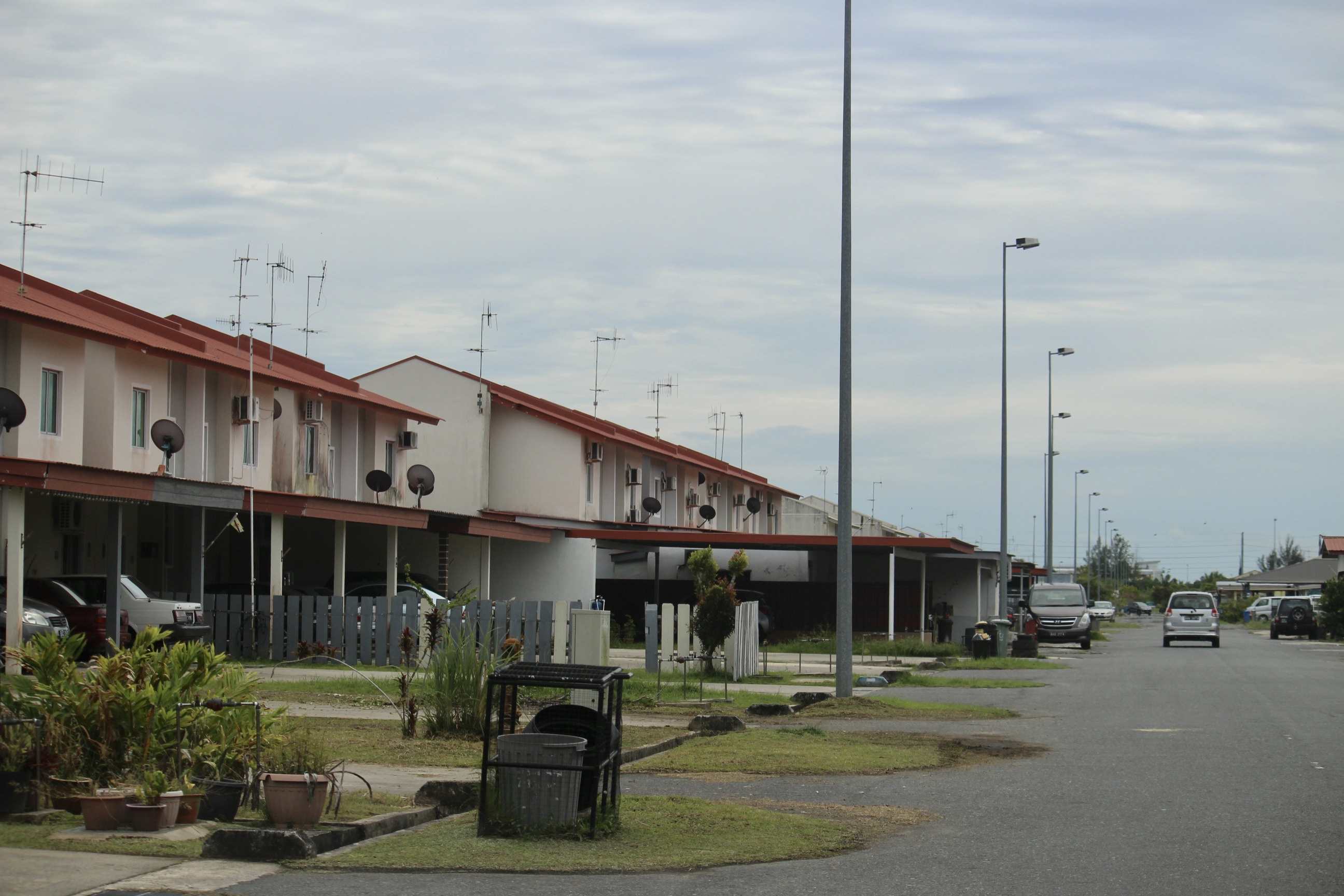
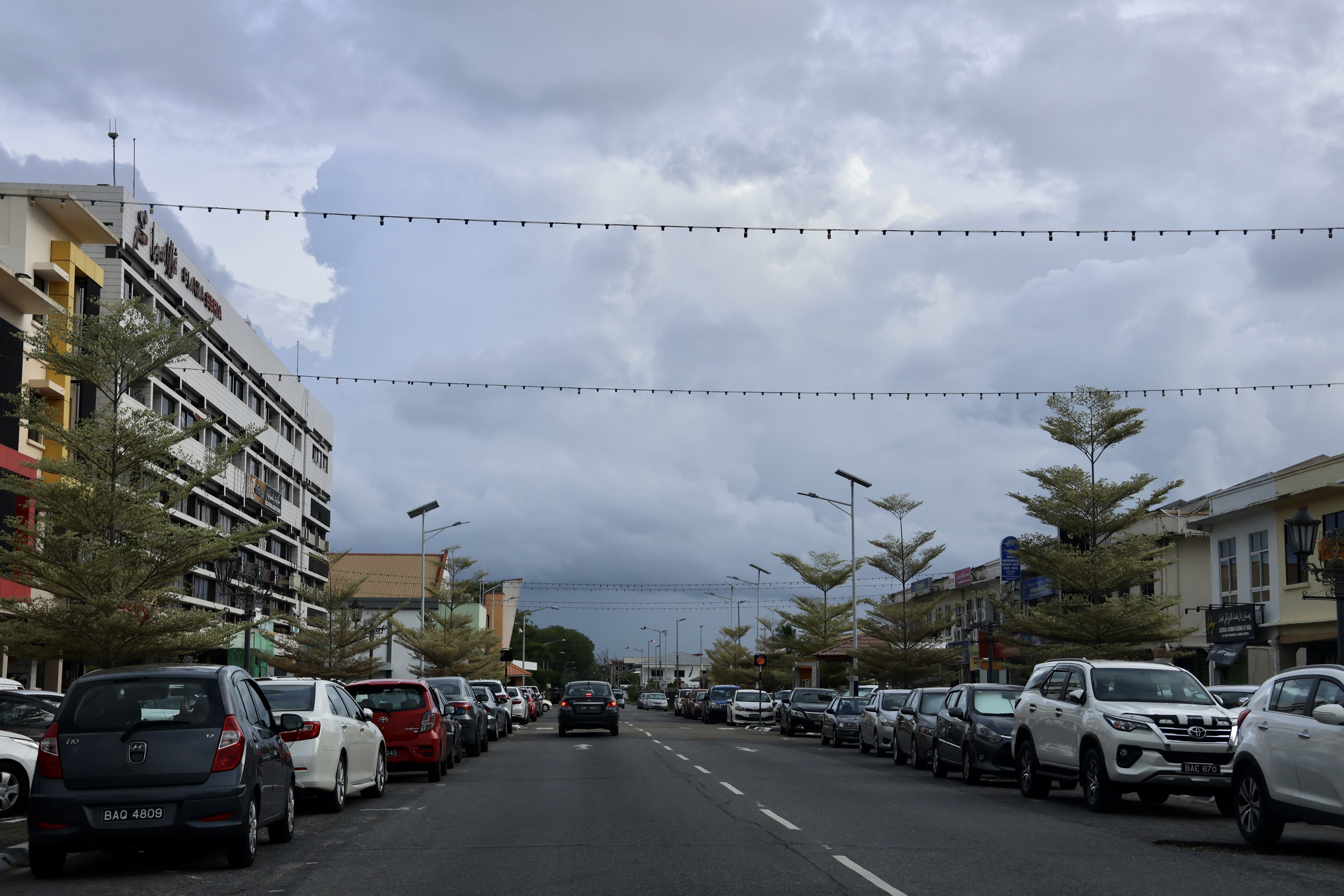
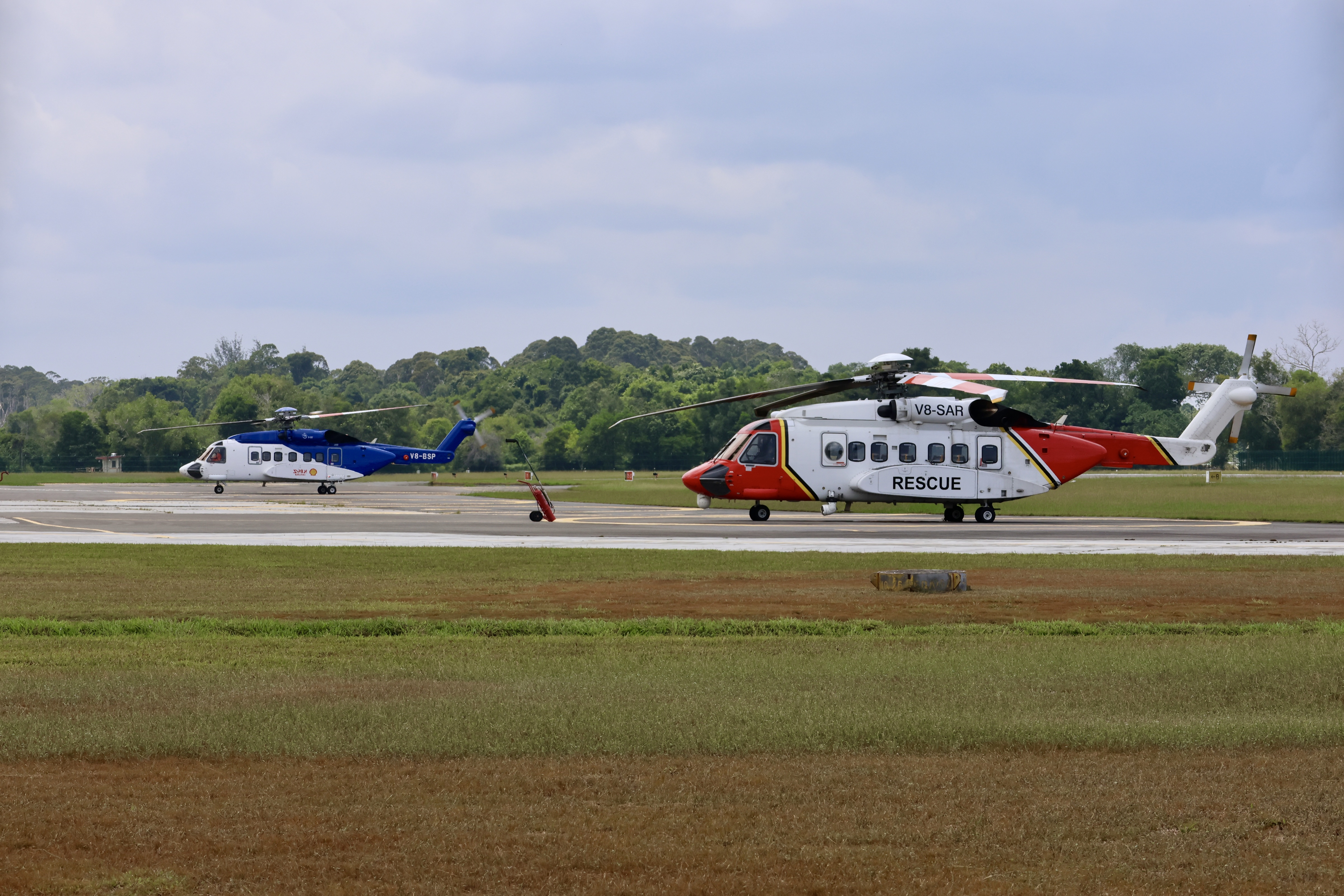
- Clockwise from top left: Mukim Seria sign, RPN Panaga, Anduki Airfield, Seria Town

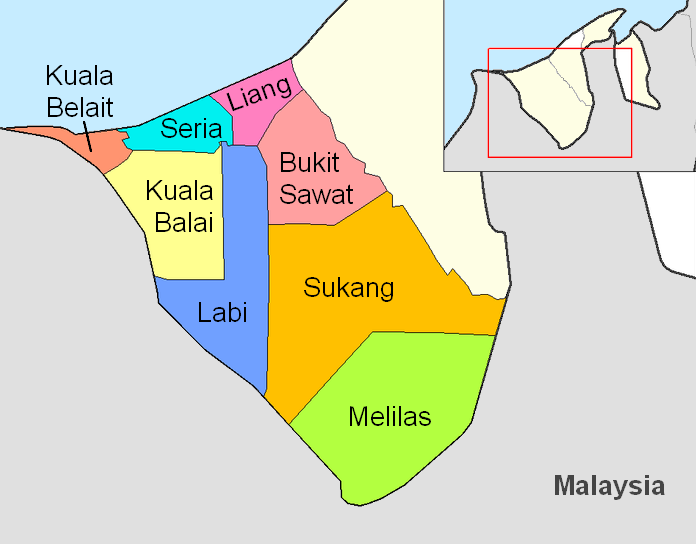
- Seria is in cyan.
- Coordinates: 4°36′N 114°20′E
- Country: Brunei
- District: Belait

Government
  - Penghulu: Sadin Ibrahim

Area
  - Total: 169 km^{2} (65 sq mi)

Population (2021)
  - Total: 18,313
  - Density: 108/km^{2} (281/sq mi)
- Time zone: UTC+8 (BNT)
- Postcode: KBxx33

Mukim Seria is a mukim in Belait District, Brunei. It has an area of 169 square kilometres (65 sq mi); the population was 21,214 in 2016. The mukim encompasses Seria, one of the only two towns in the district. It is home to the oil and gas industry of the country.

== Geography ==
The mukim is located in the north-west of the Belait District, bordering the South China Sea to the north, Mukim Liang to the east, Mukim Labi to the south-east, Mukim Kuala Balai to the south and Mukim Kuala Belait to the west.

== Demographics ==
As of 2016 census, the population was 21,214 with 50.3% males and 49.7% females. The mukim had 4,471 households occupying 4,297 dwellings. Among the population, 89.3% lived in urban areas, while the remainder of 10.7% lived in rural areas. Mukim Seria has a total of more than 1,000 elderly people who are recorded as entitled to old age pensions every month and the majority are Malays and Chinese.

== Administration ==
The mukim contains seven villages namely Kampong Baru (formerly known as Kampong Badas), Sungai Bera, Kampung Pekan Seria (formerly known as Kampong Cina), Pekan Seria Area 1 and Pekan Seria Area 2, Kampong Lorong Tiga Seria (Skim Tanah Kurnia Rakyat Jati), Kampong Lorong Tengah and Kampong Lorong Tiga Selatan (Perumahan Baru Lorong Tengah Seria), Kampong Panaga A, B and C (2000 Housing) and Kampong Masjid.

As of 2021, the mukim comprised the following villages:

Settlements	Population (2021)	Ketua kampung (2024)
Seria Town Area 1	1,908	Haji Jamail bin Haji Linap
Seria Town Area 2	751	Haji Jamail bin Haji Linap
Kampong Lorong Tiga Selatan	2,247	Haji Sadin bin Haji Ibrahim
RPN Lorong Tengah Seria Area 1	1,133	Haji Sadin bin Haji Ibrahim (Overseer)
RPN Lorong Tengah Seria Area 2	1,133	overseen by Belait District Office
RPN Lorong Tengah Seria Area 3	1,133	overseen by Belait District Office
RPN Kampong Panaga A	10,301	Md. Ariffin bin Abdullah (Acting)
RPN Kampong Panaga B	10,301	Md. Ariffin bin Abdullah
RPN Kampong Panaga C	10,301	Khairul Abidin bin Yassin
Kampong Sungai Bera	1,973	Haji Jamail bin Haji Linap (Overseer)

== Villages ==
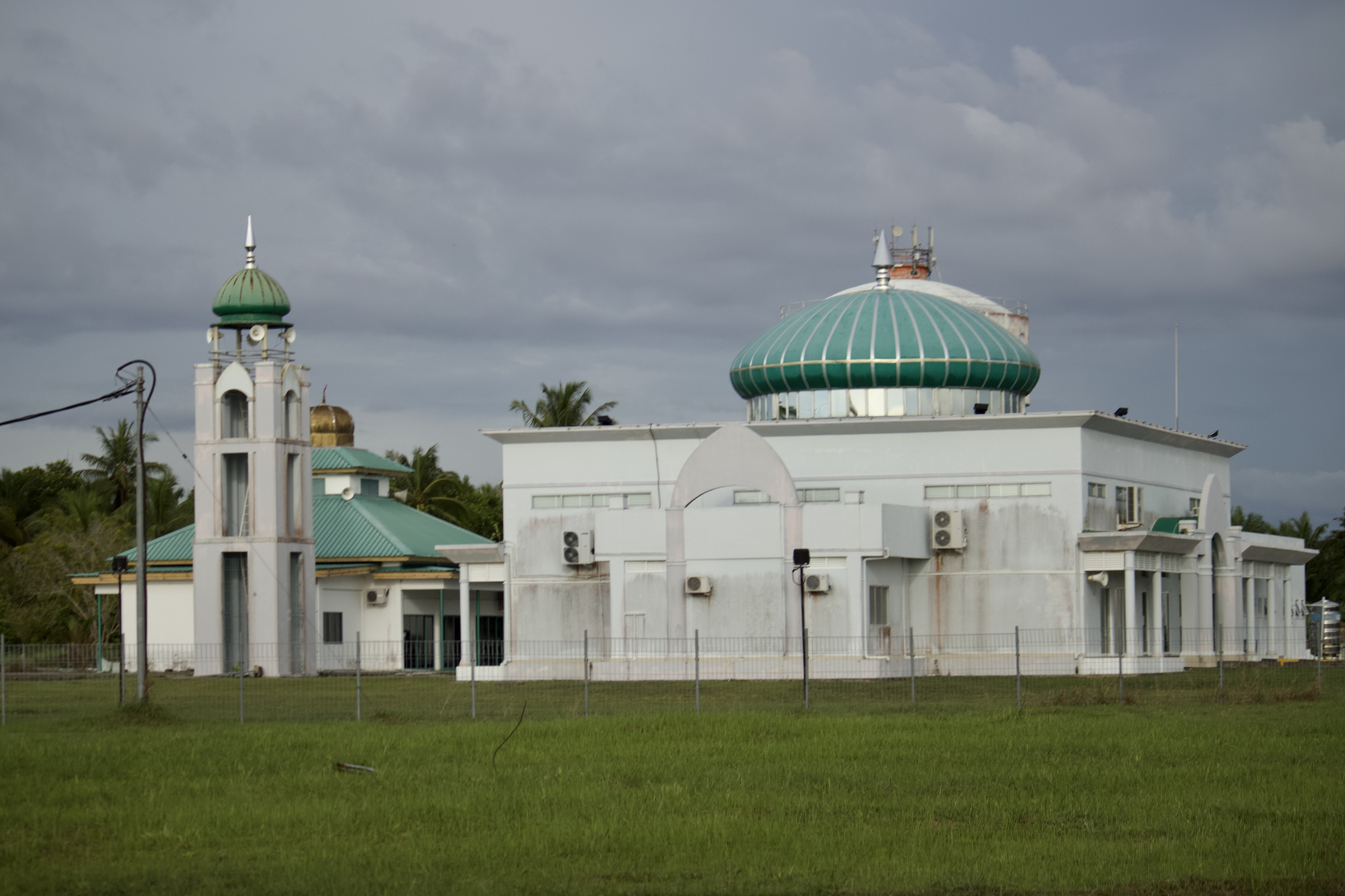
Kampong Lorong Tiga Selatan Mosque

=== Kampong Lorong Tiga Selatan ===
In Kampong Lorong Tiga Selatan area there are facilities such as a mosque, housing, old surau (which can still be used), school, football field, Kindergarten, government barracks, Bowling and Wayang Center and BFB Turker Line.

Sesagun has a gritty, nutty texture, is frequently blended with and served with a fruit that is sweeter and smoother, like bananas. A rice sesagun was cited by Kampung Lorong 3 Selatan, Seria locals as the primary output of the Members of the Majlis Perundingan Kampung (MPK) Lorong 3 Selatan, Seria, which was in contention during the AKC from 2011 to 2013. The manufacture of sesaguns project began in June 2010 and was officially released on November 23, 2010. Looking back at the company's early years, 29 MPK members from Lorong 3 Selatan, Seria, with the help of the locals, undertook the project of producing a rice bag. Only seven employees are now still actively working on the product, though.

=== Pekan Seria ===
Among the facilities available in Pekan Seria are Pekan Seria Mosque, Seria District Office, Seria Health Center (TIBI), Clinic, government and private schools, Water Treatment Plant (JKR), Khutubkhanah, Plaza Seria (shopping center), shops and supermarkets, Insani Center, Anduki Airport, Shell Aviation, Perindustriya Sungai Bera, Shell Training Centre, Vocational School (Lorong 5), Golf Course, Shell Petroleum Surau, Shell Petroleum Fire Brigade and Panaga Health Centre.

== Infrastructure ==
=== Public housing ===
There are three public housing areas within the mukim, namely Kampong Lorong Tiga Selatan and Rancangan Perumahan Negara Lorong Tengah near Seria, and Rancangan Perumahan Negara Panaga in Panaga.

== Other locations ==
The following places are located within the mukim:

- Seria oil field, the oldest oil field in Brunei
- Anduki Airfield, one of the only two airports in Brunei
- British Forces Brunei camps, existed since the 1960s
- The headquarters of Brunei Shell Petroleum
- Badas Water Treatment Plant, which supplies raw water from the Belait River to the residents in Belait District
