= Mukim Kuala Belait =

Mukim of Brunei

- Mukim
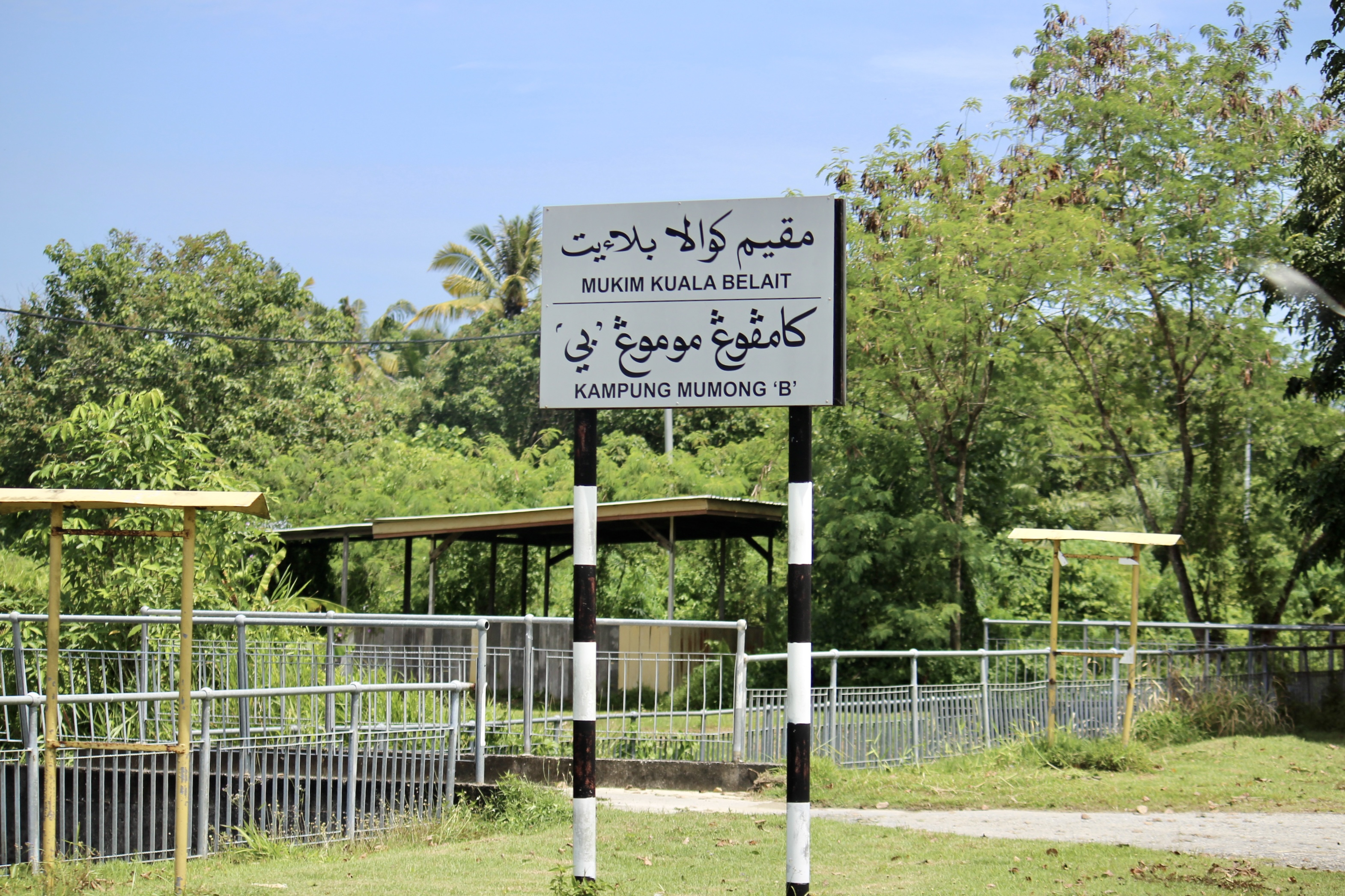
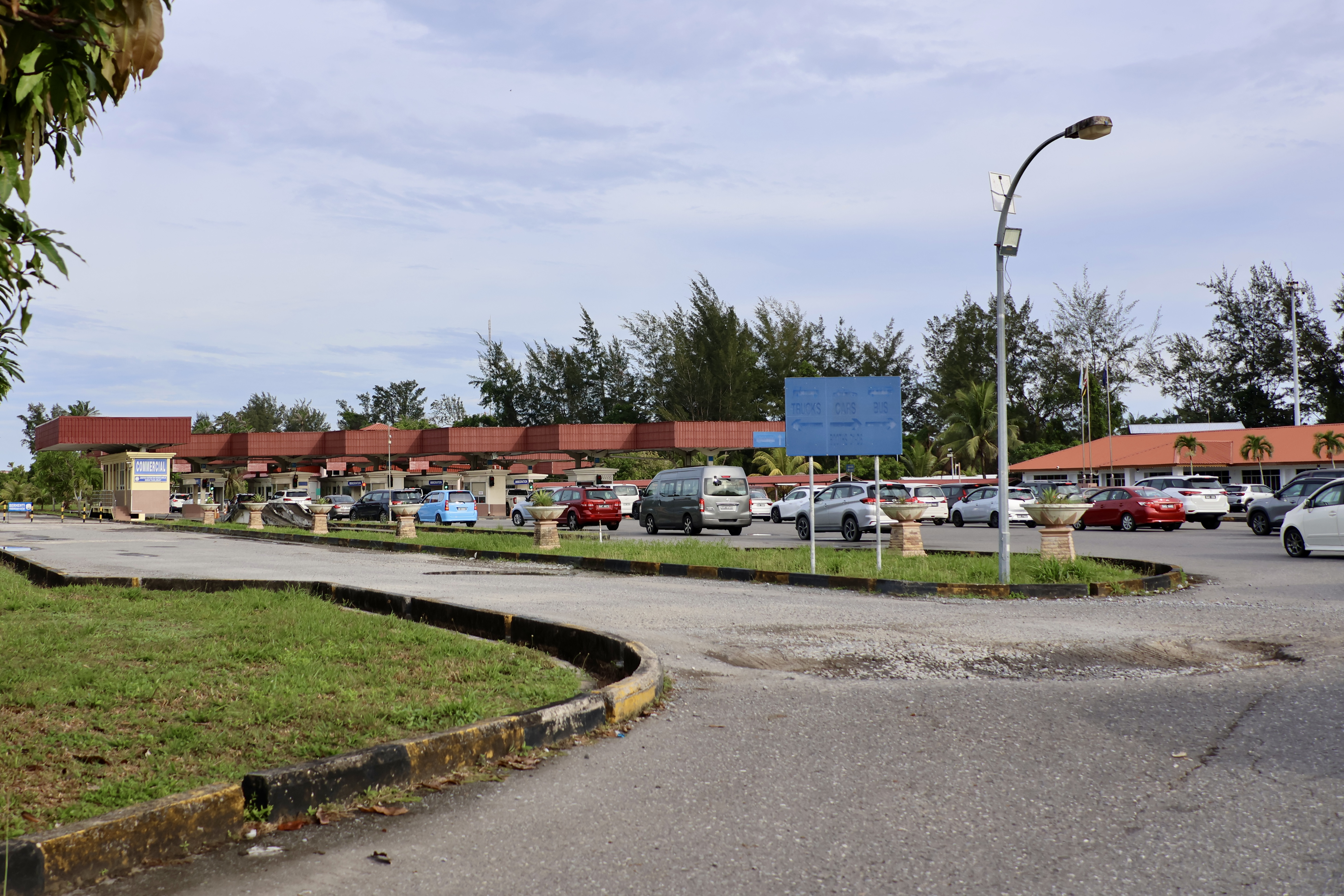
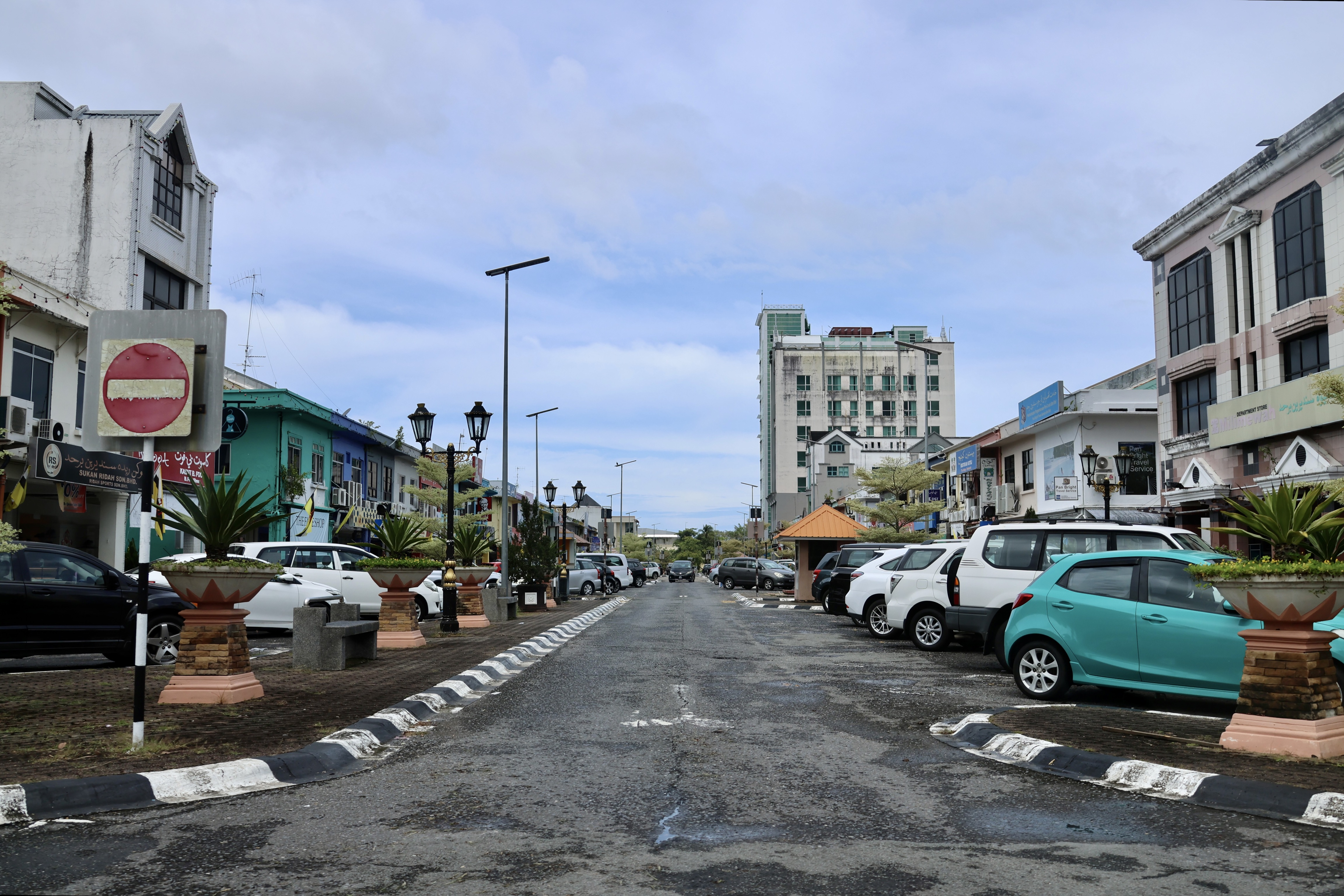
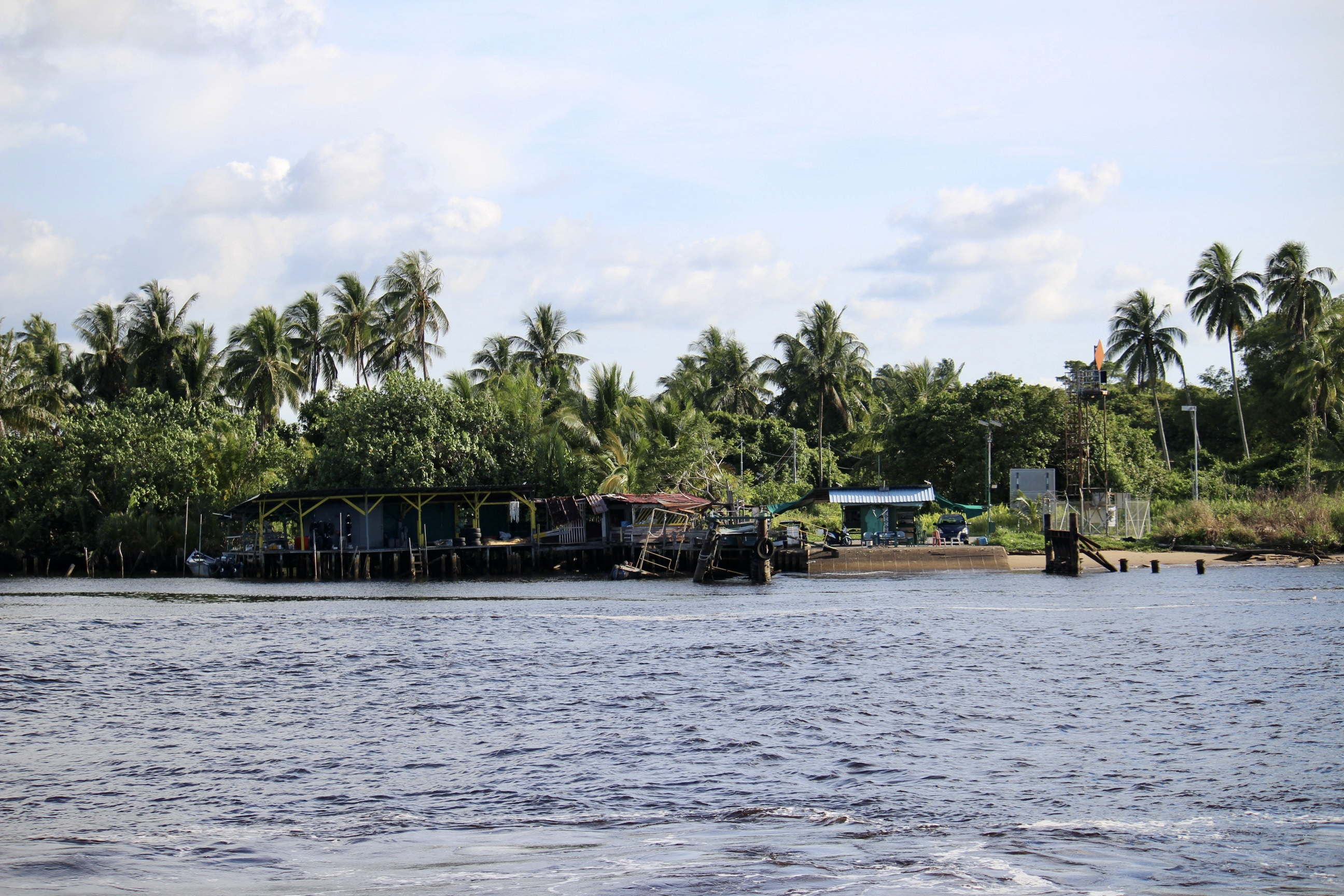
- Clockwise from top left: Mukim Kuala Belait sign, Sungai Tujoh checkpoint, Sungai Teraban, Kuala Belait Town

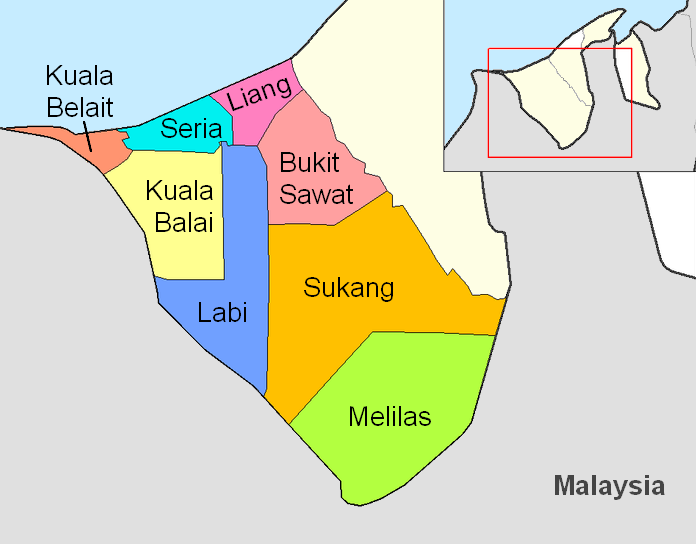
- Kuala Belait is in red.
- Coordinates: 4°35′N 114°11′E
- Country: Brunei
- District: Belait

Government
  - Penghulu: Abdul Afiq Zainuddin

Population (2021)
  - Total: 28,793
- Time zone: UTC+8 (BNT)
- Postcode: KAxx31

Mukim Kuala Belait is a mukim in Belait District, Brunei. The population was 31,308 in 2016. The mukim encompasses Kuala Belait, the administrative town of the district.

== Geography ==
The mukim is the located in the westernmost part of the district as well as the country. It borders the South China Sea to the north, Mukim Seria to the east, Mukim Kuala Balai to the south-east and the Malaysian state of Sarawak to the south and west.

The primary settlements encompassed by the mukim include Kuala Belait town, Kampong Pandan, Kampong Sungai Teraban and Mumong.

== Demographics ==
As of 2016 census, the population was 31,308 with 53.6% males and 46.4% females. The mukim had 5,819 households occupying 5,659 dwellings. The entire population lived in urban areas.

== Administration ==
As of 2021, the mukim comprised the following villages:

Settlements	Population (2021)	Ketua kampung (2024)
Kuala Belait Town Area 'A'	4,544	Muhammad Sufrizal bin Haji Hamdan (Acting)
Kuala Belait Town Area 'B'	4,544	Muhammad Sufrizal bin Haji Hamdan
Kampong Pandan 'A'	4,983	Abdul Aziz bin Haji Seri
Kampong Pandan 'B'	3,859	Muhammad Rawinyani bin Morney
Kampong Pandan 'C'	5,769	Haji Affandy bin Haji Awang Damit
Kampong Mumong 'B'	3,141	Haji Mohd Yusof bin Haji Dulamin (Acting)
Kampong Mumong 'A'	5,523	Haji Mohd Yusof bin Haji Dulamin
Kampong Sungai Teraban	974	Zaini bin Haji Kaderi

== Infrastructures ==
=== Public housing ===
There are two public housing estates in the mukim, namely RPN Kampong Pandan and STKRJ Mumong.

== Other locations ==
Other locations within the mukim include:

- Sungai Tujoh - the location of the customs/immigration point at the border with Sarawak, Malaysia
- Rasau - gas field operated by Brunei Shell Petroleum
- The mouth of the Belait River, the longest river in Brunei
- Istana Kota Manggalela, the residence of Sultan Hassanal Bolkiah in Kuala Belait
