= Belait Sixth Form Centre =

School in Kuala Belait

Belait Sixth Form Centre Pusat Tingkatan Enam Belait

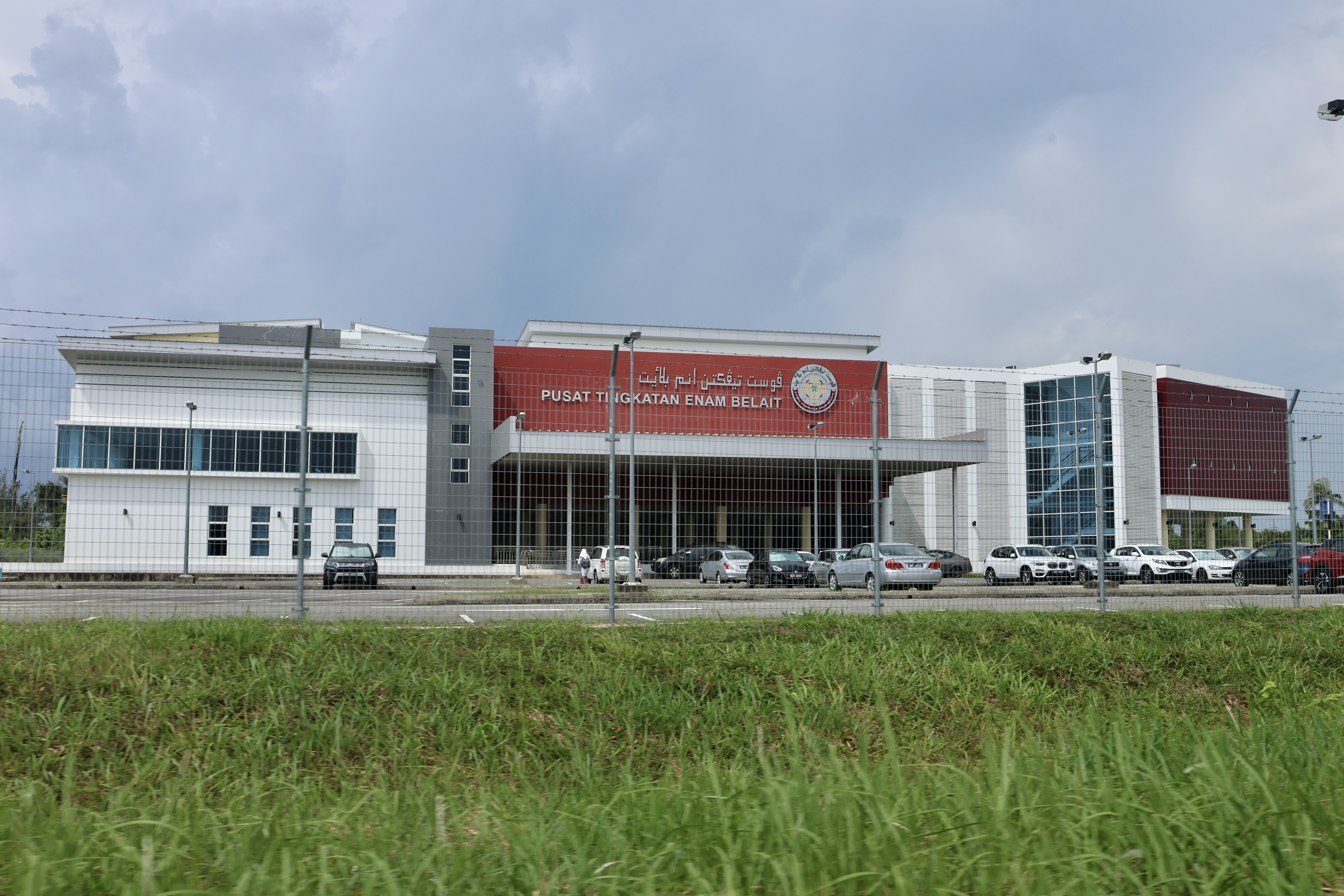

Address
- Jalan Mumong Kuala Balai; Mumong, Kuala Belait, Belait; Brunei
- Coordinates: 4.5822080°N 114.2553469°E

Information
- Former name: Mumong Science College (Maktab Sains Mumong)
- Type: Government sixth form college
- Motto: Berwawasan Dan Dinamik (Visionary And Dynamic)
- Established: 16 November 2020; 4 years ago
- Status: Operational
- Authority: Ministry of Education
- Administrator: Shamry Sani
- Principal: Chin Ai Fong
- Teaching staff: 46
- Years offered: 12th–13th
- Gender: Coeducational
- Enrollment: 112
- Color(s): Maroon
- Nickname: PTEB; PTE Belait
- Affiliations: CIE
- Website: Instagram

Belait Sixth Form Centre (Malay: Pusat Tingkatan Enam Belait, PTEB), is a co-educational sixth form school located in Mumong, Kuala Belait, Brunei. The current principal is Mrs. Chin Ai Fong.

== History ==
While efforts to fix design and structural issues with consultants were still ongoing, Suyoi Osman provided an update on 12 March 2014 regarding the ongoing investigation into the Mumong Science College project that was halted due to a roof collapse, as well as the ongoing 'Stopped Work Order'. The first accident claimed the life an Indonesian worker, while the second accident injured 9 other workers. On 31 October 2017, the school began applying fireproof materials to the building.

Prior to the opening of the school on 16 November 2020 students carried out higher educations in the Sayyidina Ali Secondary School (SMSA). Amidst the 2nd wave of COVID-19 pandemic in Brunei in late 2021, the building was converted into a quarantine area with its designation as COVID-19 Holding Area Belait 6th Form (CHABEL6). Therefore, educations were carried out virtually and later in the SMSA building once again.

== See also ==
- List of schools in Brunei
