= Sayyidina Ali Secondary School =

- Sekolah Menengah Sayyidina Ali
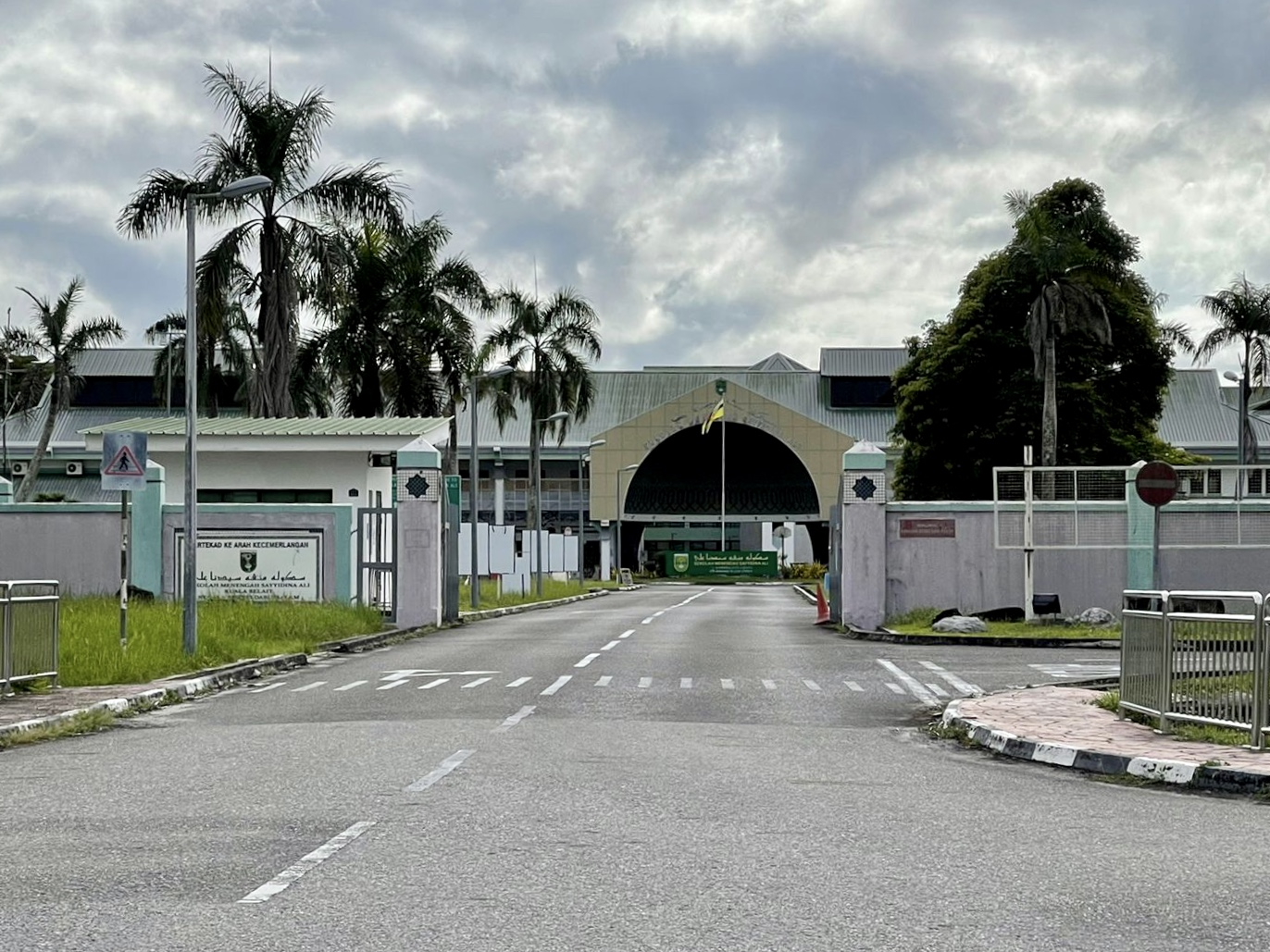

Location
- Jalan Pandan 8 Kampong Pandan, Kuala Belait, Belait District; Brunei
- Coordinates: 4.5890007°N 114.241889°E

Information
- Former name: Kampung Pandan Secondary School (Sekolah Menengah Kampong Pandan)
- Type: Government
- Motto: Bertekad Ke Arah Kecemerlangan (Strive Towards Excellence)
- Established: 9 May 1994; 32 years ago
- Status: Operational
- School district: Kuala Belait
- Authority: Ministry of Education
- Principal: Dayang Mas Diana binti Haji Abdul Samat
- Teaching staff: 120
- Gender: Coeducational
- Enrollment: 1500
- Color: Green
- Nickname: SMSA
- Affiliations: CIE

Sayyidina Ali Secondary School (Malay: Sekolah Menengah Sayyidina Ali, Abbrev: SMSA), is a co-educational school located in Kampong Pandan, a suburban village in Kuala Belait, Brunei. In 2025, it has a student population of 500 students of which are from Year 7 to Year 11 students. The current principal is Ms Mas Diana Binti Haji Abdul Samat.

== History ==
The Construction of the school was completed on November 30, 1993. Upon its establishment on May 9, 1994, it was initially named Sekolah Menengah Kampung Pandan (English: Kampong Pandan Secondary School) and catered exclusively to secondary students. On August 3, 1996, the school was officially renamed to its current name.

In 1997, a sixth form centre was introduced, enabling students in Kuala Belait to pursue their pre-university studies locally. Previously, all previous sixth form education in Brunei was available only in Bandar Seri Begawan.

At present, the school offers curriculum leading up to BC-GCE "O" and IGCSE examination, including BTEC qualification.

== List of Principals ==
- Dayang Annie Anak Sindai
- Awang Othman bin Haji Adol
- Pengiran Hajjah Zeiniun binti Pengiran Mudin
- Mr. Awang Steven Shim Sheau Huei
- Ms Mas Diana binti Haji Abdul Samat (28 October 2024 to present)

== Staff ==
The school has 80 teachers, as well as office staff and other workers.

== School motto ==
Bertekad ke Arah Kecemerlangan (Strive towards excellence).

== Secondary Level ==
•Year 7

•Year 8

•Year 9

•Year 10

•Year 11

== O level and IGSCE subjects ==
The school offers 15 subjects for the GCE "0" Level and IGCSE course, namely:

- Mathematics
- Physics
- Chemistry
- Biology
- Business Studies
- Geography
- Bahasa Melayu
- Islamic Religious Studies
- IGCSE ICT
- IGCSE Food and Nutrition

== See also ==
- List of schools in Brunei
