= Mukim Kuala Balai =

Mukim of Brunei

Coordinates: 4°31′04″N 114°17′41″E

- Mukim
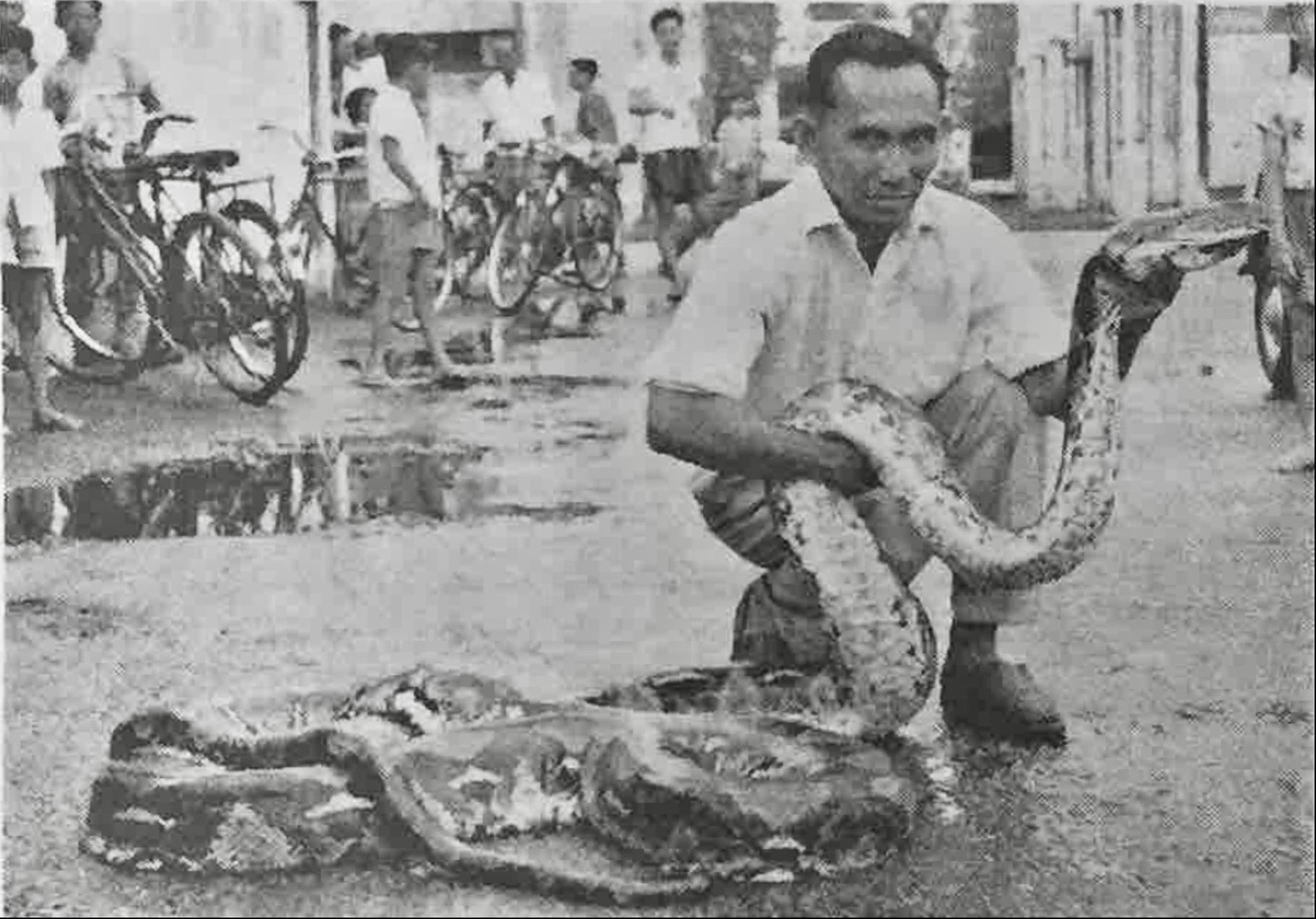
- Kampong Kuala Balai in 1964

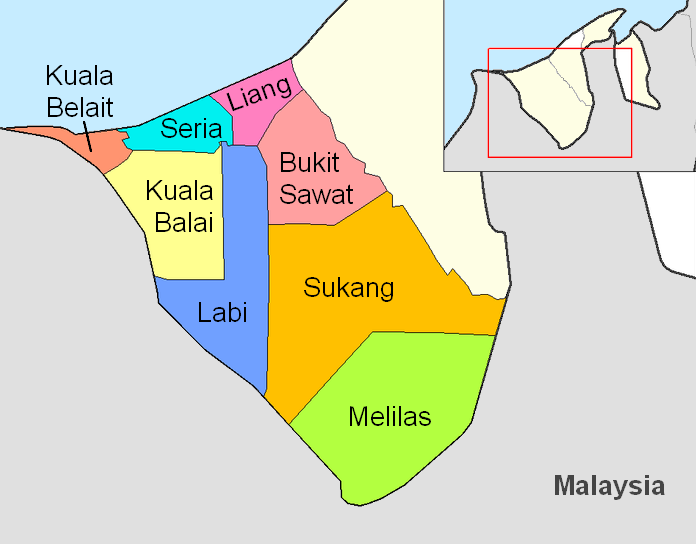
- Kuala Balai is in yellow.
- Country: Brunei
- District: Belait

Population (2021)
  - Total: 16
- Time zone: UTC+8 (BNT)
- Postcode: KDxx32

Mukim Kuala Balai is a mukim located in the Belait District of Brunei, known for its unique geographical setting. As of 2026 there is no known residents living there. The village of Kampong Kuala Balai is situated in the upper Kumgang region of Belait, forming part of the Mukim Kuala Balai catchment area. It is located approximately 28 kilometres (17 mi) from Kuala Belait. However, Kampong Kuala Balai is currently uninhabited due to factors such as migration to other villages and employment opportunities elsewhere, leading to a decline in its once-thriving community. It is an early settlement of the Belait people, who formed the majority of its population, and it once served as the administrative center for the Belait District during traditional governance and British residency, while also being a prominent exporter of ambulong (sago) in its heyday.

== Etymology ==
Kampong Kuala Balai was originally known as Kampong Long Pelai, named for the confluence of the Damit and Belait Rivers. The term "Long Pelai" is derived from the Belait ethnic group, where "Long" means river mouth, and "Pelai" has two meanings: "defect" and "to hold" or "to stop." When the water level of the Damit River recedes, it does not flow into the Belait River; instead, it stagnates at the river mouth (long). Similarly, when the Belait River experiences a high tide, the water does not flow into the Damit River, resulting in water "holding" at the mouth of the Damit River. This phenomenon of stagnant water is referred to by the villagers as Long Pelai, highlighting the uniqueness of the area.

Kampong Long Pelai is rich in natural resources, with the surrounding land featuring sago palms and other forest products, while the waters provide opportunities for fishing. This abundance of resources transformed Long Pelai into a new settlement, leading to the construction of a longhouse. The villagers cultivated sago palms to produce high-quality sago or ambulong, which attracted merchants from other districts to buy their products. According to the locals, the name Kampung Long Pelai eventually evolved into Kuala Balai due to a misunderstanding by an outsider from Brunei Town, who mistakenly interpreted "Pelai" as "Balai." As a result, the area became known as Kuala Balai among the villagers.

== Geography ==
The mukim borders Mukim Seria to the north, Mukim Labi to the east and south, the Malaysian state of Sarawak to the west and Mukim Kuala Belait to the north-west. Kuala Balai, characterized by its wetlands and riverfront, is not naturally conducive to rice cultivation. Consequently, and alongside the rice fields in rural Labi, the ancestors planted rumbia trees along the Belait River.

== History ==
Originally a small fishing community, Kuala Balai was designated as the headquarters of the Belait District in September 1907, a status it maintained until 1929 due to a significant increase in oil prospecting licenses issued by the Bruneian government. While oil exploration efforts did not lead to growth in Kuala Balai, Kuala Belait experienced considerable development during this period.

Kampong Kuala Balai is believed to be the original settlement of the Belait people, with some later relocating to cultivate rice or pursue employment in government, commercial businesses, and oil companies. While many residents preserved their traditional homes, others formed connections through marriage in different regions. Over time, younger generations began moving to Kuala Belait and Seria, causing the village's population to decline sharply from 150 in 1955 to fewer than 100 by 1959. This population drop led to the closure of the village school, leaving many remaining residents to rely on sago production for their livelihood. Despite government efforts in 1963 and 1967 to relocate the community—initially to Labi and later to Kampong Mumong—these proposals were declined. As a result, the government opted not to construct a road connecting Kuala Balai to Kuala Belait, citing the village's steadily decreasing population.

In 1977, Pehin Ariff Mujun proposed that the government construct a small road linking Kuala Balai with Kuala Belait. He expressed hope for the establishment of a primary school in Kuala Balai and the appointment of a religious instructor to serve as the Imam and lead the village's Friday prayers.

== Economy ==
The residents of Kampung Puak Belait have honed their skills in producing sago from sago palms, (Note: Primary ingredient in preparing ambuyat.) which thrive abundantly along the banks of the Damit and Belait Rivers. This thriving sago industry has historically been known for producing high-quality sago for commercial sale. During the Japanese occupation, the military introduced modern machinery, specifically generators, which the villagers used to enhance their sago processing capabilities. This technological innovation not only increased production but also significantly boosted their income and contributed to the country's exports at the time. However, by the 1970s, the sago industry began to decline due to population migration to other regions, ultimately leading to its extinction. A survey conducted in 2010 revealed several abandoned sago processing factories, left in disrepair and serving as a stark reminder of the industry's disappearance.

== Demography ==
As of 2016 census, the population was 31 with 45% males and 55% females. The mukim had 4 households occupying 4 dwellings. The entire population lived in rural areas. As of 2016, Kampong Tanjong Ranggas is the only populated village in Mukim Kuala Balai. There are only a few scattered stilted buildings in various states of deterioration in the settlement (on the right side of the road). The country's largest community in the west used to be Kuala Balai.

== Administration ==
As of 2021, the mukim consisted the following villages:

Settlements	Population (2021)	Ketua kampung (2024)
Kampong Tanjong Ranggas	16	—N/a

== Transportation ==
=== Road ===
The Mumong bypass is approximately a 20-minute drive from the settlement on the Belait River's banks, and the freshly repaired gravel route should be accessible to any vehicles with a typical road clearance.

=== Water ===
From the Kuala Belait Jetty, it takes 45 minutes by river to go to Kuala Balai by boat as the river served as its main thoroughfare. A voyage required six hours of arduous rowing in a longboat, and bigger cargo-carrying boats used to travel up the Belait River when the population was large enough to maintain a school. The thick-stemmed palms may still be observed on the boat voyage to Kuala Balai.

== Infrastructure ==
A muslim cemetery sits within Kampong Kuala Balai.

=== Religion ===
Islam began to flourish in Kuala Balai during the 19th century when Pengiran Anak Tengah was appointed as the Sultan of Brunei's representative to manage administrative affairs in the Belait District in 1883. He married a local woman from the Belait community, and his successor, Pengiran Shahbandar Pengiran Anak Hashim, significantly contributed to the development of Islam in the village. In 1909, Orang Kaya Singa Menteri Awang Gador built a mosque between the houses of Abang Bujang and Abang Taha bin Ghafar. This wooden mosque, with a roof made of rumbia leaves, measured 40' x 40' and had a long veranda of 40' x 12'. The mosque was led by Imam Radin Muhammad Salleh, who came from Pontianak, Kalimantan, and was brought to the village by Pengiran Anak Hashim from Benoneh, Sabah. His son, Radin Matali bin Radin Muhammad Salleh, served as the bilal, and both played vital roles as religious teachers and leaders for the community.

In the 1920s, the mosque underwent renovations, replacing the roof with wood and using planks for the walls and floor. It featured a beduk, a traditional drum used to signal prayer times, breaking fast, and notifying the community of deaths. The beduk was struck in varying rhythms depending on its purpose. After the passing of Imam Radin Muhammad Salleh, his son Radin Metali took over the imam position, while Abdul Ghani, originally from Ambon Island, Indonesia, later assumed the role. The original mosque served the community for 47 years until it was replaced in 1956 by a second mosque built by the Ikhwanul Muslimin Association, Kuala Belait, in Sungai Besar, Kuala Balai. This new mosque was constructed from wood with a wooden floor and plank walls, topped with a zinc roof. However, by 1975, the mosque was no longer in use due to population migration to other areas.

== Notable people ==
- Kefli Razali (born 1940), military officer and nobleman
