= Panaga =

Village in Brunei

- Village
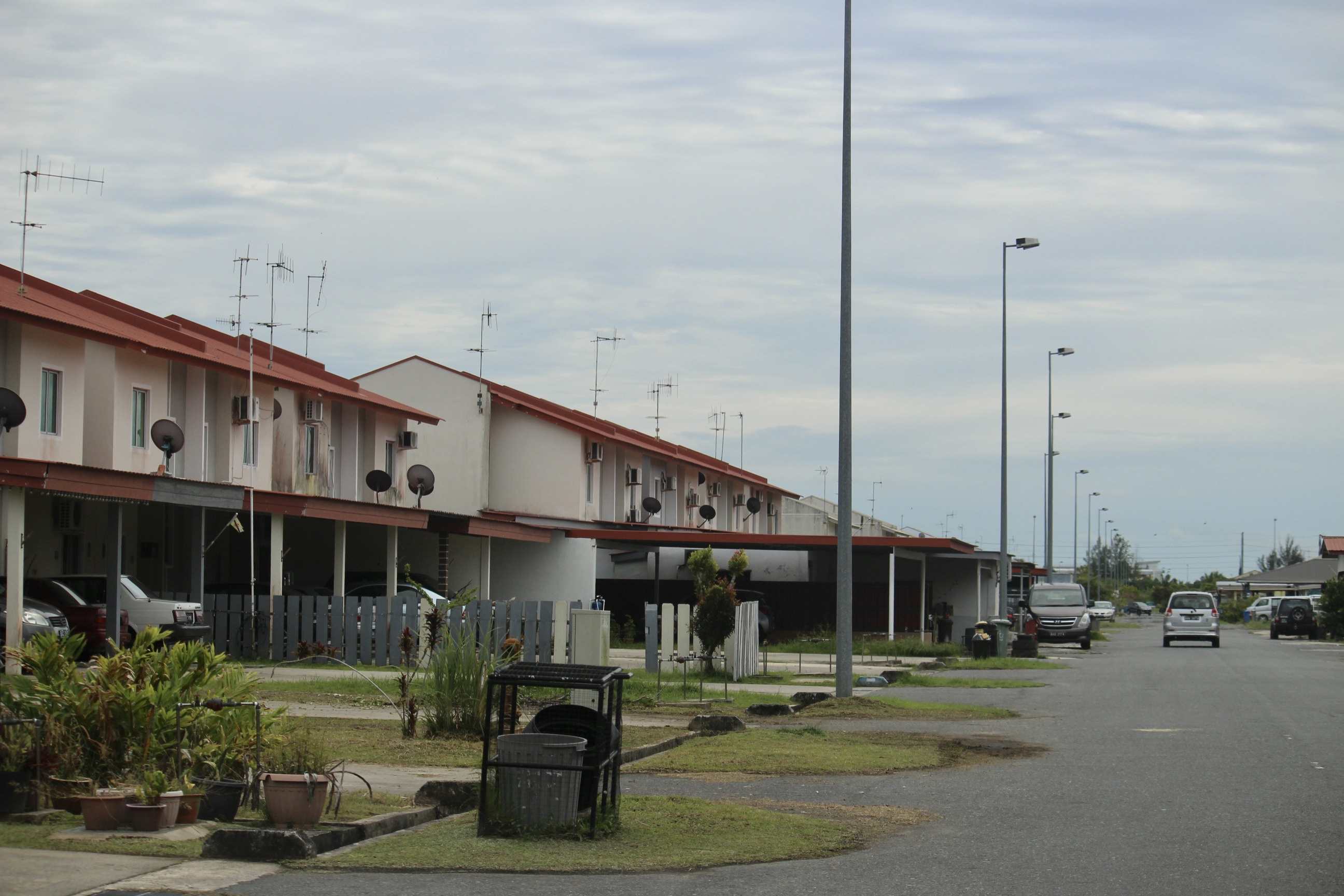
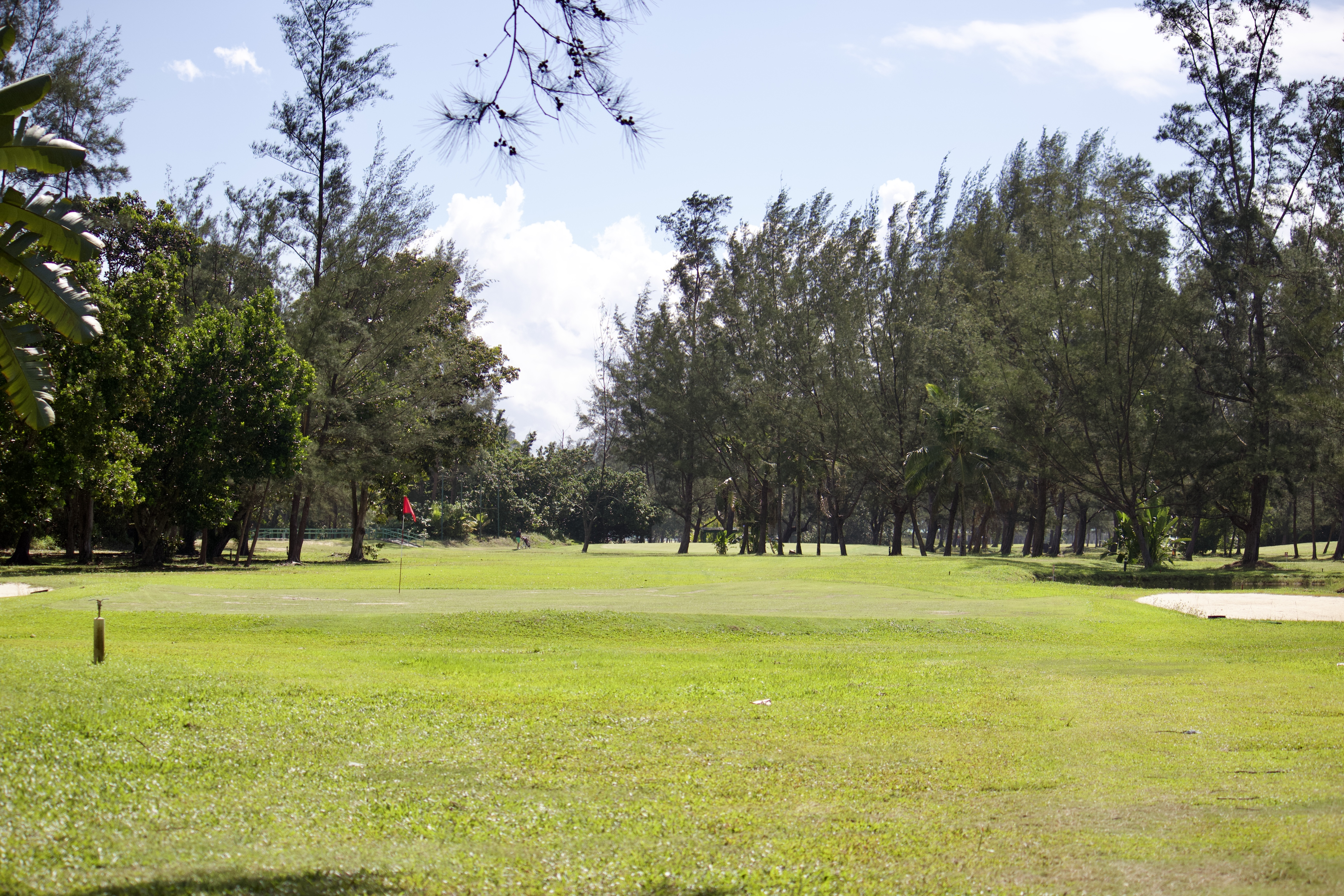
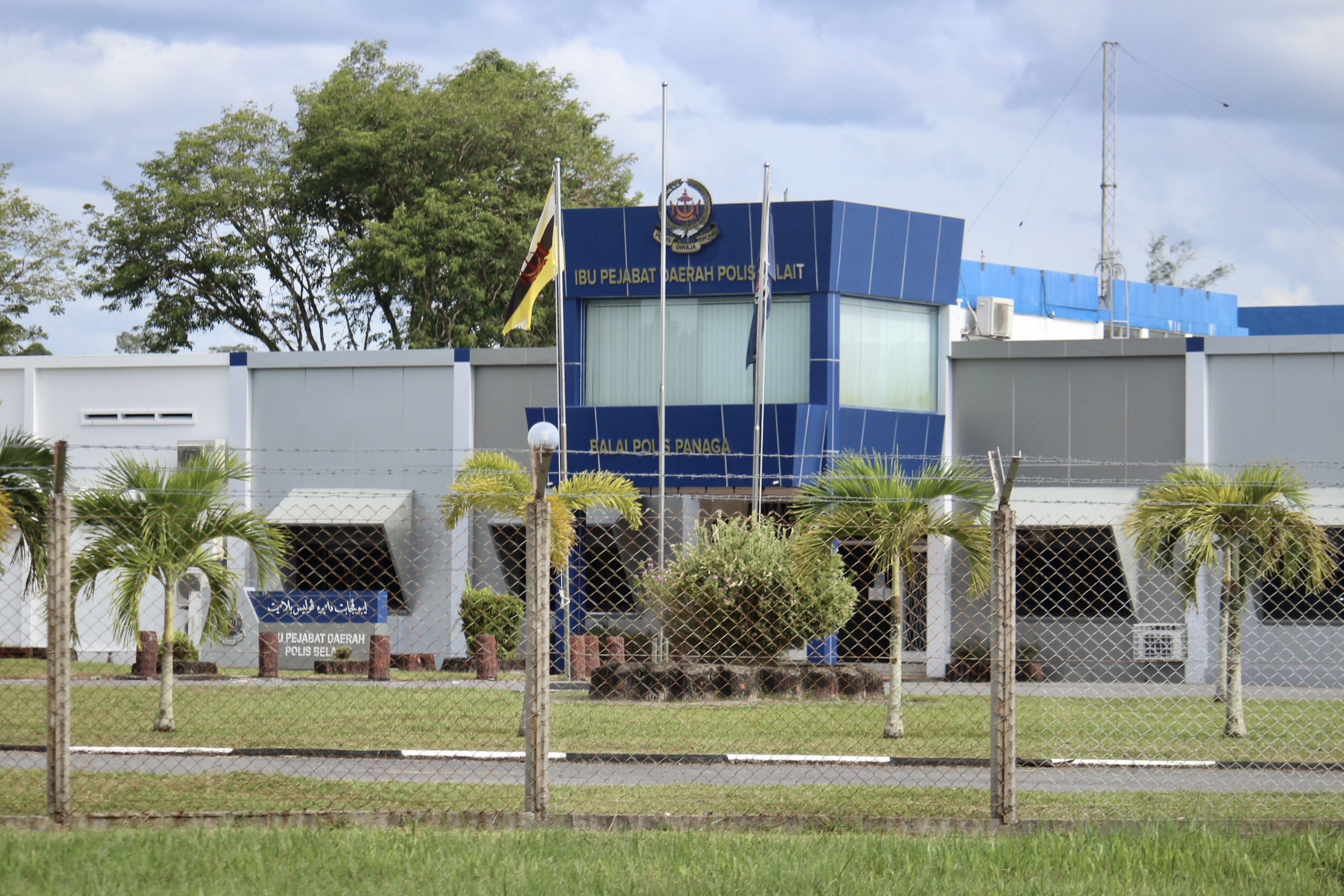
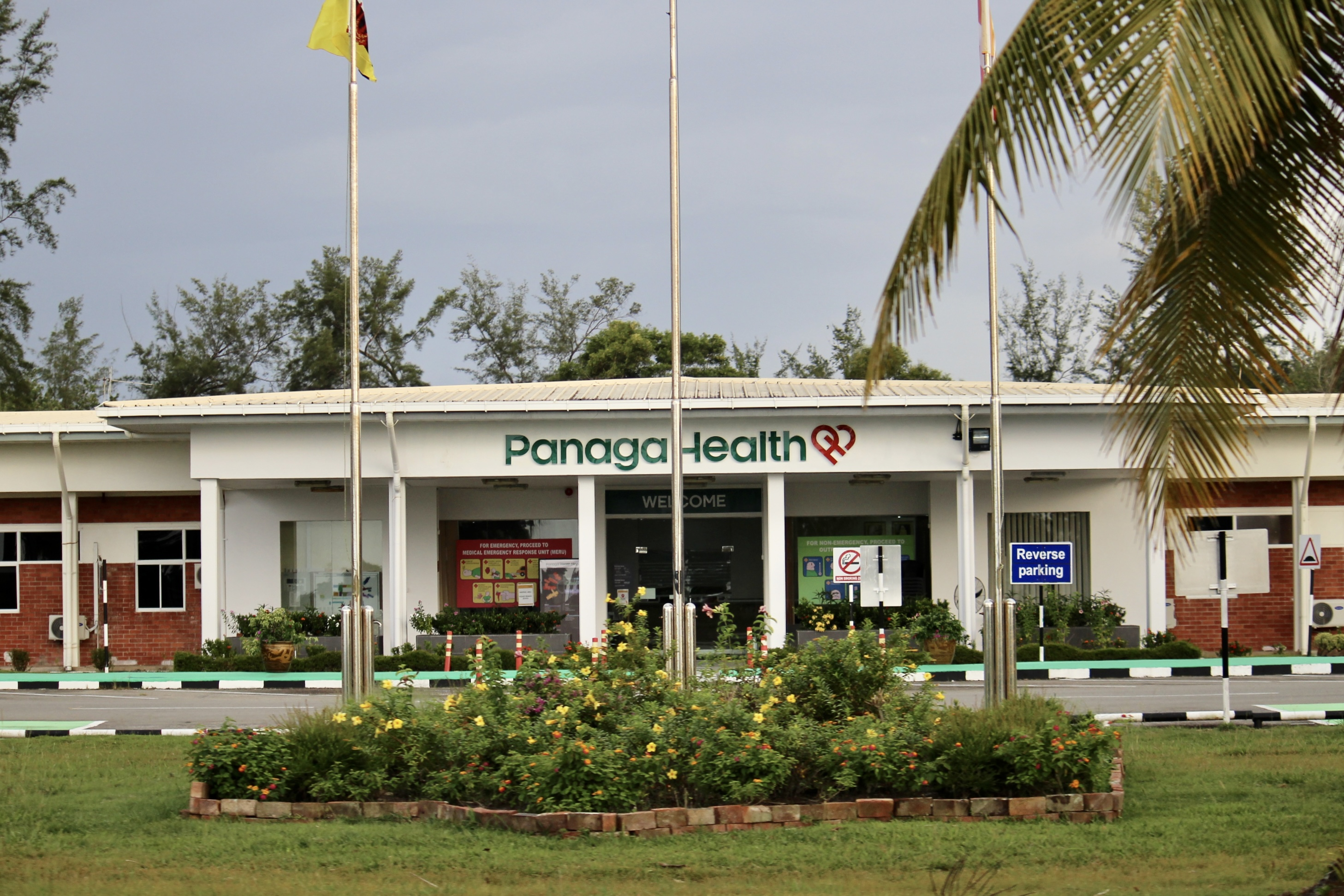
- Clockwise from top left: Panaga 2000 Housing, Panaga Golf Club, Panaga Health, Panaga Police Station

- Location in Brunei
- Coordinates: 4°36′06″N 114°17′31″E
- Country: Brunei
- District: Belait
- Mukim: Seria

Government
  - Village head: Ariffin Abdullah (Area A & B); Khairul Abidin (Area C)

Population (2021)
  - Total: 10,301
- Postcode: KB4533

Kampong Panaga (Malay: Kampung Panaga) or commonly known as Panaga, is a village-level subdivision under Mukim Seria, Belait District. The postcode for Panaga is KB4533.

== Geography ==
A new species called Cytherelloidea panagaensis, named for Panaga was discovered close to the Panaga rivulet's mouth. The species has been extensively studied in Seria and off Sabah, with occurrences at depths of up to 96 metres (315 ft). It is represented by a female carapace (holotype).

== History ==
During the 8 December 1962 Brunei revolt, rebels from the Brunei People's Party, with assistance from the North Kalimantan National Army, launched an assault on the Seria oil town and the Panaga police station. Indians in Seria were initially unaware of the violence unfolding elsewhere until some were captured by the rebels and used as human shields in an attack on the police station. As rumours spread, the community faced fear and uncertainty, with some taking refuge in their homes while others were held captive. Despite the rebel efforts to seize control of the police station, it was repelled and remained unoccupied throughout, marking a dramatic and terrifying moment in the community's history.

Panaga played a role in several key events during the revolt, including the military campaign to retake Anduki Airfield. The operation utilised Panaga Golf Course, located 8 kilometres (5.0 mi) west of the airstrip, as a landing site for five RAF Pioneers. Despite challenging terrain, these aircraft successfully deployed troops, enabling a swift government takeover of Anduki. Additionally, Panaga School served as an emergency headquarters, equipped with security provisions, a powerful radio transmitter linked to Singapore's military base, and secret evacuation plans for BSP staff in the event of an invasion.

== Infrastructure ==
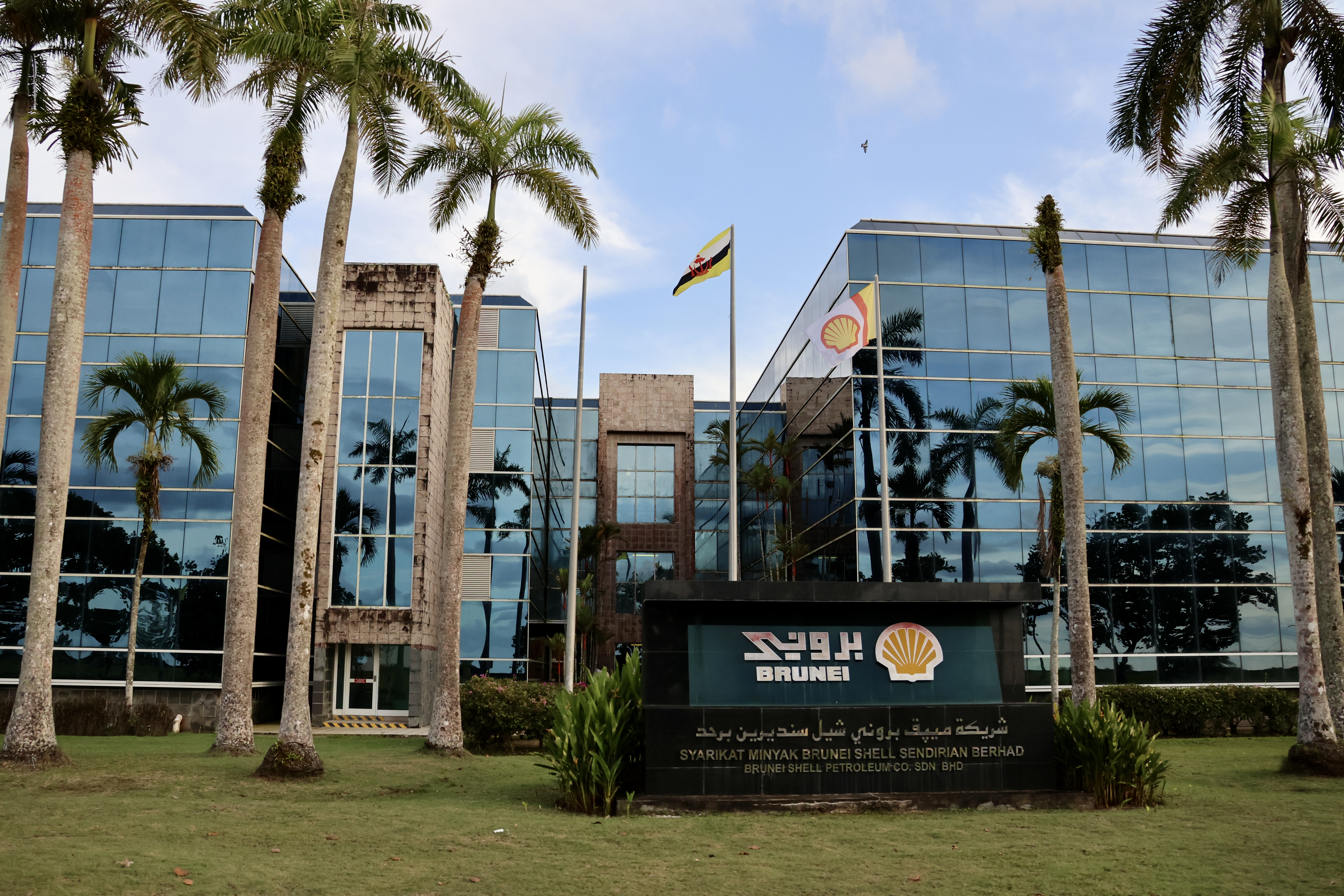
BSP Head Office

Panaga is home to several key facilities, including the headquarters of Brunei Shell Petroleum (BSP), which serves as the central hub for the company's operations. The Panaga police station, built in 1956, after undergoing several refurbishments, was officially reopened on 3 June 2019, while the Brunei Shell Fire Station, also owned by BSP, provides essential emergency services to the area. Additionally, Panaga Health, formerly known as Panaga Health Centre, was rebranded on 16 March 2022 to enhance healthcare services, marking its 54th anniversary and offering facilities to both the community and BSP clients. Furthermore, Panaga is home to BSP's solar plant, which launched in 2025 and features nearly 7,000 solar panels, supporting Brunei's renewable energy goals and helping reduce carbon emissions.

The Berry Bridge was built around 1940. It is located on the main road between Seria and Kuala Belait, near the entrance to Panaga 2000 Housing, with a length of 100 feet and a width of 30 feet. This bridge is the oldest in Belait District, built by BSP, and is still in use today.

=== Education ===
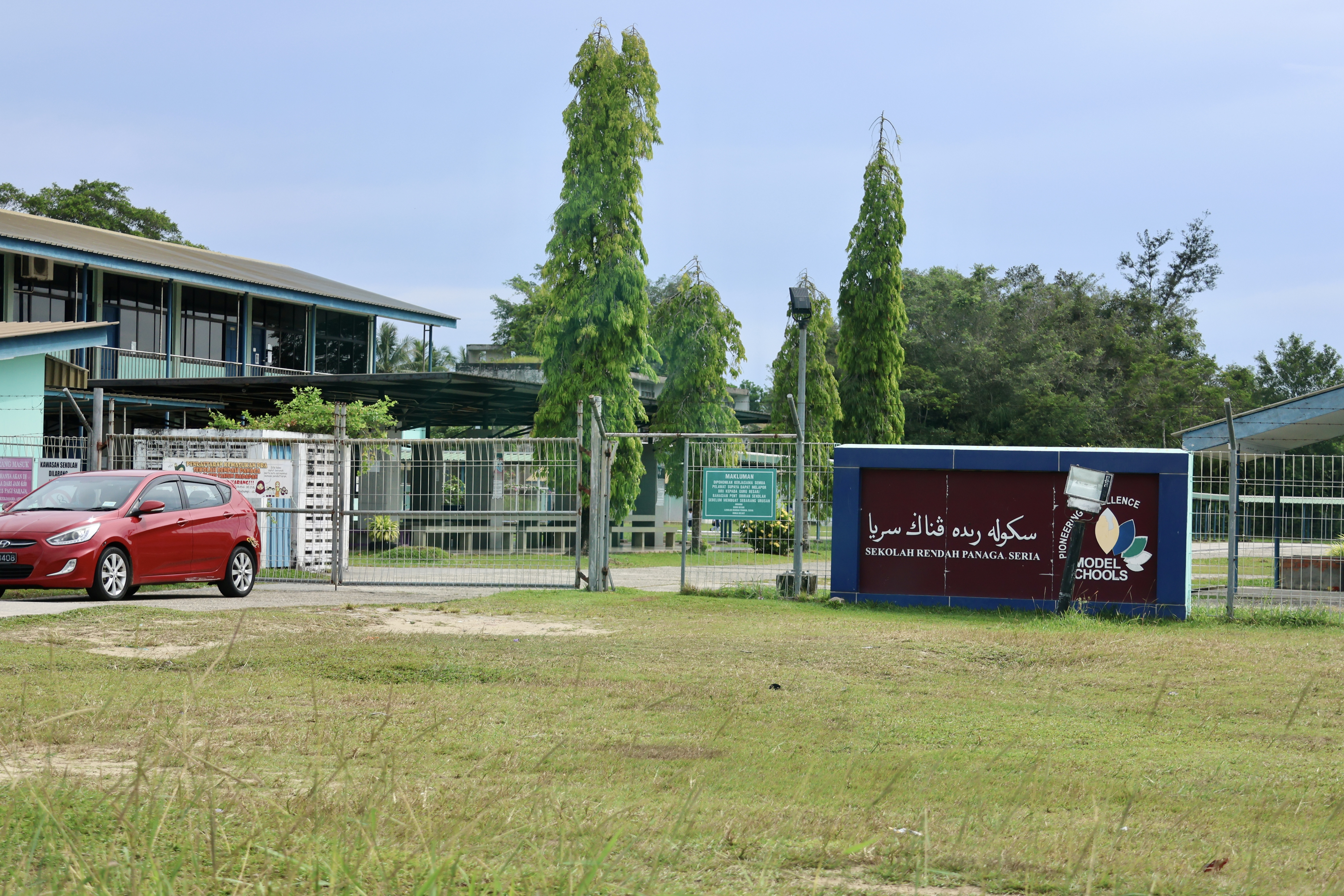
Panaga Primary School

Panaga is home to several educational institutions, including both public and private schools. These include Hornbill School Brunei and Panaga School, which are private institutions, as well as Panaga Primary School and Panaga Religious School, both of which are public schools. Additionally, the International School Brunei (ISB) Centre for Inclusive Learning operates in the area, providing specialised educational support.

=== Public housing ===
Between April 2009 and April 2011, Bina Puri Holdings constructed 1,200 terrace houses and 800 semi-detached homes as part of the Brunei Economic Development Board's pilot project in Panaga. Awarded for B$288.7 million, the project incorporated modern features such as fibre-to-the-home internet, a vacuum sewerage system, steel tunnel formwork, and land preparation for future commercial and community facilities. The semi-detached units have a floor area of 131.1 square metres (1,411 sq ft), while the terrace houses measure 127.5 square metres, all organised into six precincts with distinct colour schemes. On 30 June 2011, the Housing Development Department (HDD) under the Ministry of Development (MoD) officially received the 2,000 houses in a handover ceremony attended by senior government officials, during which the dummy key was presented to the MoD and subsequently to the HDD. The housing area has since been known as RPN Kampong Panaga 2000, or simply Panaga 2000 Housing.

=== Recreation ===
The Village Consultative Council of Panaga has organised various activities in the Panaga Lagoon region to showcase local projects and efforts aimed at village progress, while also fostering family ties and communal development. In addition to these community initiatives, the area is home to two recreational clubs, the Panaga Club and the Brunei Shell Recreational Club (BSRC), which primarily serve BSP employees and expatriates. The BSRC Football Club, founded in 2004, is also based in Panaga, further contributing to the area's recreational and social scene.

== Notable people ==
- Pengiran Khairul Khalil (born 1975), former prince consort
