= Mukim Melilas =

Mukim of Brunei

Coordinates: 4°14′N 114°40′E

- Mukim
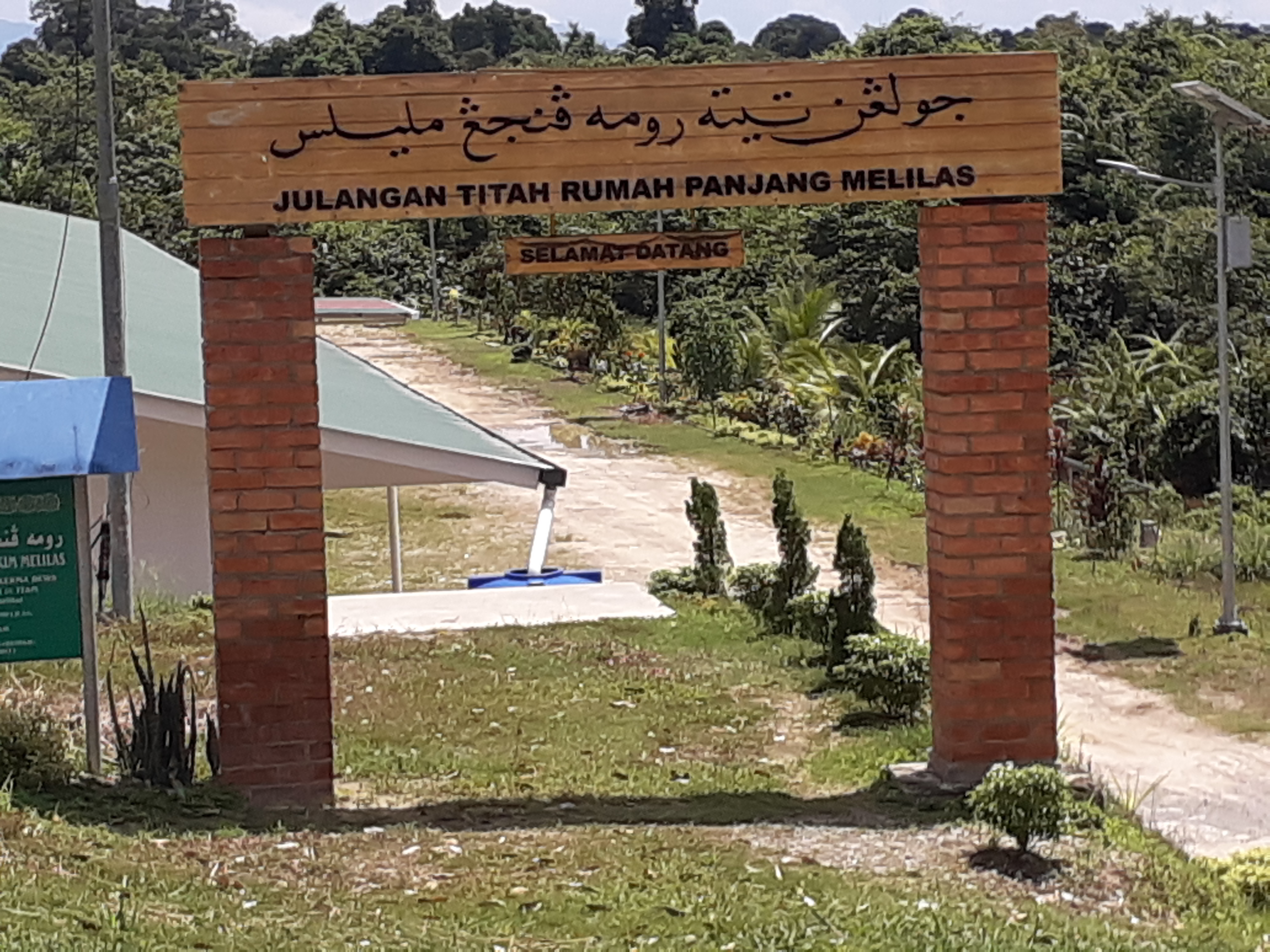
- Kampong Melilas

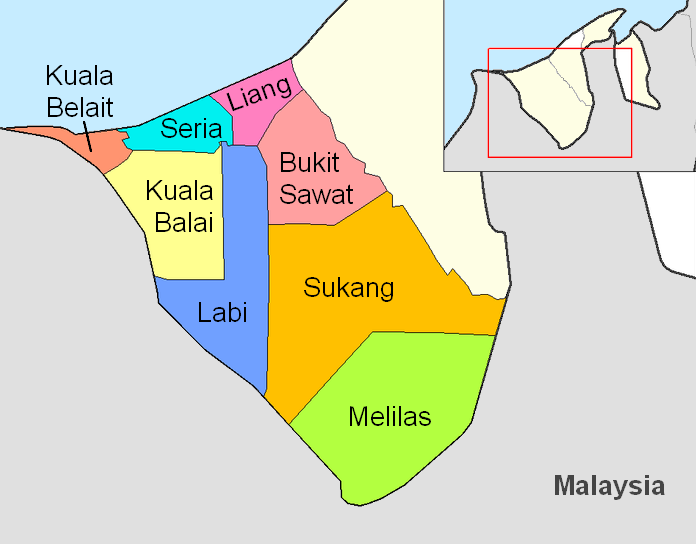
- Melilas is in green.
- Country: Brunei
- District: Belait

Government
  - Penghulu: Mohammad Abdullah

Area
  - Total: 602.803 km^{2} (232.744 sq mi)

Population (2021)
  - Total: 29
  - Density: 0.048/km^{2} (0.12/sq mi)
- Time zone: UTC+8 (BNT)
- Postcode: KHxx39

Mukim Melilas is a mukim in Belait District, Brunei. The population was 29 in 2016, the least populous mukim in all of Brunei. It is considered the final and most isolated settlement in Belait, and maybe all of Brunei.

== Etymology ==
According to the history of the people living in the village, the word 'melilas' comes from the Iban word 'mengilas' which refers to a tree whose wood is used by the Iban tribe for cooking. Behind the original word which is 'mengilas' it is said in an expression that is wrong in terms of spelling and sound which is 'melilas' and until now the village remains under the name of Kampong Melilas. The mukim could be named after a village it emcopasses, Kampong Melilas.

== Geography ==
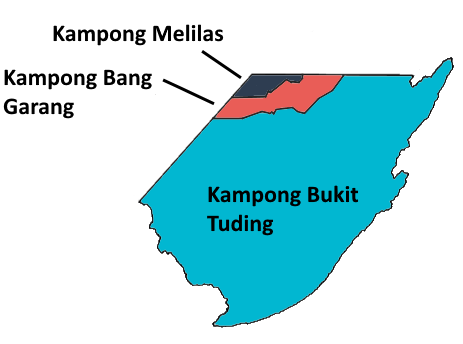
Map of the village subdivisions in Melilas.

The mukim is located in the interior and southernmost part of the district as well as the country. It borders Mukim Sukang to the north and the Malaysian state of Sarawak to the east, south and west.

Mukim Melilas is covered with an expanse of green primary forest with plantations that can be seen on the roadside.

== Demography ==
As of 2021 census, the population of Mukim Melilas had a population of 29: 15 males and 14 females. The mukim had 13 households occupying thee dwellings. The entire population lived in rural areas. Although most of the people in the village moved or worked in towns or urban areas, during school holidays and the Gawai Dayak and Hari Raya, they will return en masse to celebrate the festivities.

== Administration ==
As of 2021, the mukim consist the following villages:

| Settlements | Population (2021) | Ketua kampung (2024) |
|---|---|---|
| Kampong Melilas | 29 | —N/a |

== Kampong Melilas ==
It was claimed by the acting ketua kampung that the villagers arrived in Bukit Tuding (Tuding Hill), which was their original settlement, by traveling down the coast from Marudi, Sarawak, Malaysia prior to the outbreak of World War II (before 1939). They eventually relocated to a community along the Belait River (Melilas River). After a while, they moved down to the river area in 1959, where they stayed until they moved into their current location in 1974.

There are two villages under Kampong Melilas's administration, namely Rumah Panjang (Longhouse) Julangan Titah Kampung Melilas or before that known as Rumah Panjang Melilas and Rumah Panjang Bebalat. Julangan Titah Longhouse has 15 doors and is inhabited by approximately 280 people of which 90 percent are Muslims while Bebalat Longhouse has five doors and is inhabited by 50 residents. As opposed to earlier, when they had to draw water from the adjacent river, the new longhouse has power equipment, water pumps, and water tanks at each entrance, donated by the Sultan of Brunei. Beginning in mid-December 2015 and lasting for eight months until the replica house keys were handed over on 20 June 2016, building on the long house was under way.

== Economy ==
Most of the residents of Kampong Melilas practice a subsistence economy such as growing rice, gardening, collecting forest and river produce. It has its own Majlis Perundingan Kampungnya (MPK) by making handicrafts and weaving as 1K1P products. Among them are tudung saji, nyiru, small mats, takiding and others made of bamboo and rattan. The Sungai Ingei Conservation Forest region may also be reached via Kampong Melilas, which follows the stream. This region, which has a size of around 18,491 hectares, is a forest reserve area under the management of the Forestry Department. In Sarawak, Malaysia, on the edge of the Gunung Mulu National Park, is the Sungei Ingei Conservation Forest. This location is also situated in a region designated as a management region to support Brunei's execution of the Heart of Borneo Initiative.

== Transportation ==
=== Road ===
The lengthy, meandering Jalan Labi, which is over 50 kilometers in length, is where the journey to Belait's south begins. Even though it is short, the road is totally made of tarmac, making it safe for small sedans to travel all the way to the finish, where there is another Iban encampment called the Teraja Longhouse. A connection to the east, halfway along Jalan Labi, takes you to Jalan Merangking. From here, one travels farther south, first stopping at Mukim Sukang and then continuing on to Melilas. In the few years that followed, it became standard practice to avoid traveling alone, particularly during the rainy season. The trip took at least three hours for the uninitiated, whether they were traveling from Kuala Belait or the capital. Provided with greenery along the journey in the form of forest trees of different sizes, and occasionally coming across little houses constructed by the people. The summit of Mount Mulu, which can be seen from Kampong Melilas as the car ascends the mountainous route. The road leading into Mukim Melilas has already been renovated to concrete, which undoubtedly makes life easier and more comfortable for both the villages and the general public who wish to travel there.

=== Air ===
The community's medical requirements were supported by the construction of a helipad and a linked access path, which also accommodated notable guests.

== Infrastructure ==
The amenities and infrastructure that the Sultan provides, such as the village worship center, Melilas Primary School with teacher residences, and other things, are also available to Mukim Melilas. There is a room in Rumah Panjang Julangan Titah that may be used for free by people who have been assigned to Kampung Melilas and want to spend the night there. By the end of 2015, the only longhouse in the final village of Melilas was over 40 years old and in critical condition. Despite the fact that termites had eaten through the structure's hardwood floors and stilts, which compromised the whole basis, the community's major concern was their leaking roof.

The mandate was swiftly started under Julangan Titah, a unique initiative sponsored by donations from the public and commercial sectors as well as from individuals and managed by a secretariat made up of top government officials and Prime Minister's Office. The first time trucks, excavators, and cranes were heard in Melilas in October 2016; locals recollect construction workers working shifts from early in the morning until late at night. Eight months later, there was without a doubt Brunei's biggest longhouse, and at $2 million, it was also reputedly the most costly.

The government cleared woodland in 2006 to build the first land route to Melilas. Those with the means purchased 4x4 cars, shod them with mud terrain tires, and made the jarring trip up the twisting, mountainous path. A two-year Faunal Biodiversity Survey conducted at the Sungei Ingei Conservation Forest to the attention of the nation in 2010. The originally orange-brown dirt walkway is now covered to varied degrees with gravel and cement. Any automobile should be able to reach Brunei's border by the middle of 2018 if the road improvement is completed and the potholes and cracked pavement along Jalan Merangking are repaired.
