= Belait Swamp Forest =

Important Bird Area in Brunei

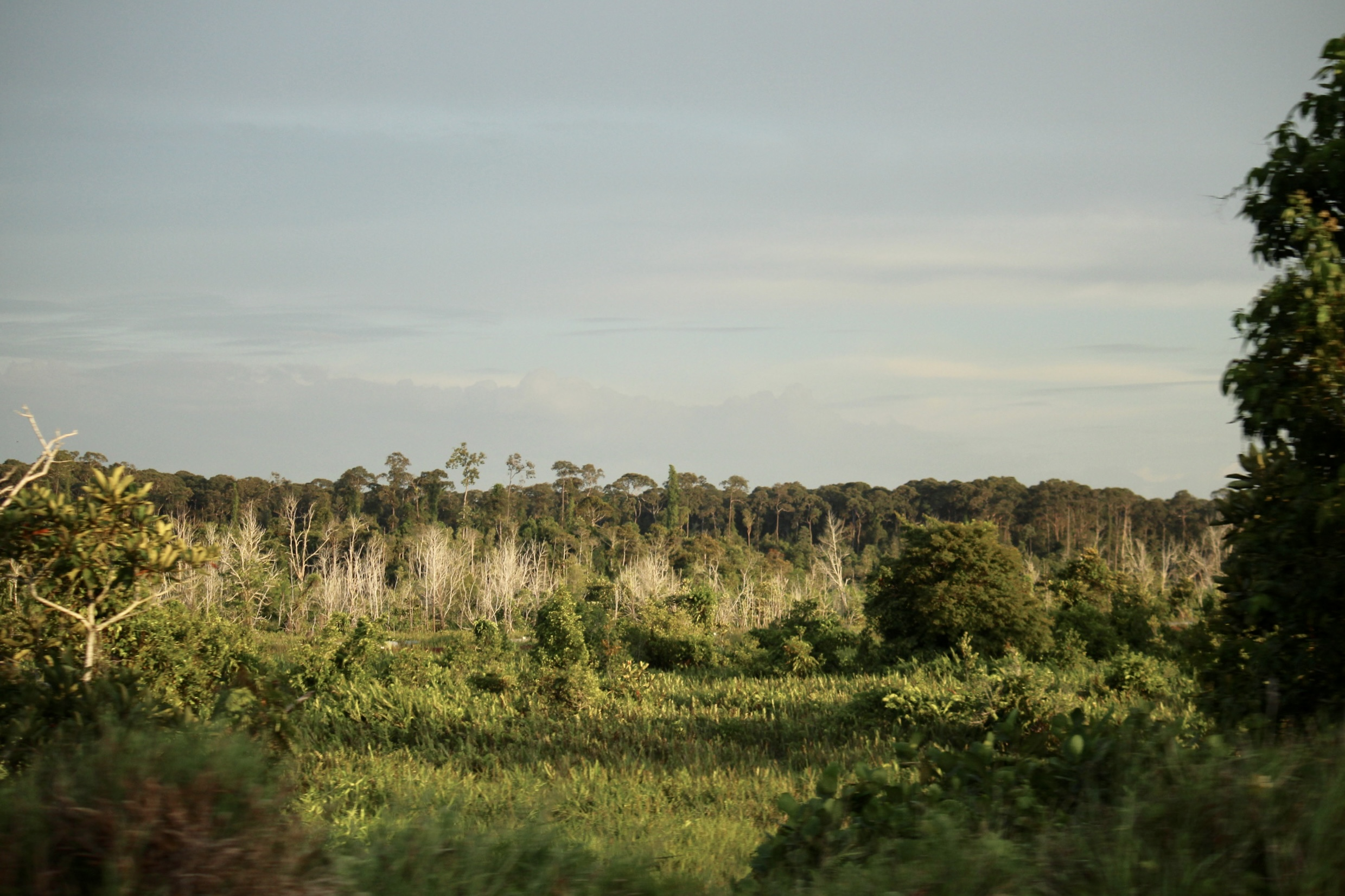
- Belait Swamp Forest

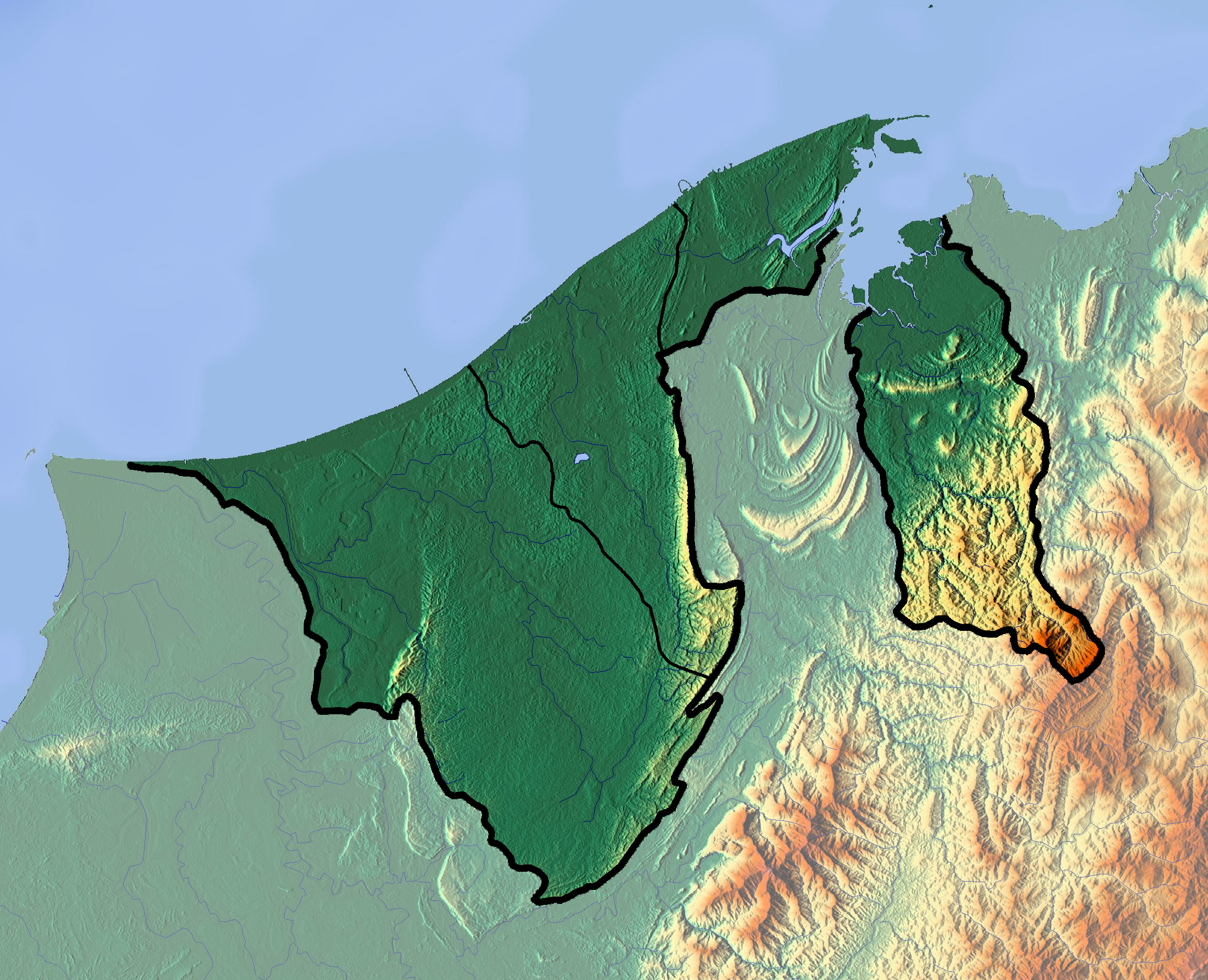
- Location within Brunei
- Interactive map of Belait Swamp Forest
- Type: Nature reserve
- Location: Brunei
- Coordinates: 04°25′10″N 114°23′00″E
- Area: 1,492 hectares (14.92 km^{2})

The Belait Swamp Forest, also known as the Belait Peat Swamp Forest, is the largest and most developed coastal peatland in Brunei, located within the Belait River system at Ulu Mendaram. Covering approximately 25,000 hectares (62,000 acres) of forested land in the Belait District of north-western Borneo, it comprises a mix of peat swamp, dipterocarp, and tropical heath forest. Recognised as one of Brunei's six key critical sites for biodiversity protection, it has also been designated by BirdLife International as an Important Bird Area (IBA) due to its ecological significance.

The peat swamp forest covers some 90,884 hectares, or 15.6% of the country as a whole, and is the second most widespread forest type in Brunei. The largest and most intact extent is in the Belait District, where it lies unbroken over the border into Sarawak's Baram basin.

== Geography ==
The Belait Swamp Forest is a visible geographic feature in the huge peat swamp forest ecosystem of Brunei, which constitutes the most extensive swamp forest type in the nation. It occurs close to the coastline at low levels and is part of an outward-expanding seaward delta. The coastal wetland is typified by deep, waterlogged, and acidic peat soils, which were formed over thousands of years via the gradual build-up of partially decayed organic matter. In addition to the Belait Swamp Forest, the district also includes other peatland types, including upland peatlands on the Labi and Ladan Hills, and older basin or river valley peatlands along the middle and lower reaches of the Belait River. These are products of the district's differing topography and hydrology.

== Importance ==
The Belait Swamp Forest is an essential part of Brunei's long-term forest and environment management plan. As part of the plan to expand its permanent forest reserve area in a direction towards the achievement of timber self-sufficiency, Brunei proposed the creation of the Belait Peat Swamp Forest Reserve according to Anderson and Marsden's 1988 forest resources development plan report. The purpose of this project is to meet growing local demand for woodwithout turning to exports, while maintaining sustainable forest development practices. Due to its both environmental importance and ability to meet national wood needs, the Belait Swamp Forest waschosen as an optimal site for the development. If triggered together with other reserves that are recommended, the scheme would addBrunei's reserved forest area by 937 square kilometres (362 sq mi), or 41%.

Additionally, the forest is also prioritised in the nation's effort towards the fulfillment of the 2020 Aichi Biodiversity Targets. It contributes significantly to the coverage of swamp forest habitats for Brunei's protected area system, which already takes up 41% of national land area and will increase to 55%. The inclusion of the forest within national biodiversity planning is a sign of its designation under notable conservation categories, such as protection forests or national parks, marking its ecological significance and the need to conserve it further.

The IBA contains some forest reserves, but as a whole is vulnerable to habitat fragmentation from pipeline and road construction, and by wildfire.

== Flora and fauna ==
The Belait Swamp Forest has been designated as IBA due to the fact that it is home to critical numbers of a variety of threatened and endangered bird species. Some of those that have been spotted are the black partridge, Bornean crestless fireback, green pigeon, Storm's stork, Wallace's hawk-eagle, wrinkled hornbill, Malay blue-banded kingfisher, blue-headed and fairy pittas, Bornean bristlehead, hook-billed bulbul, straw-headed bulbul, and large-billed blue-flycatcher.
