= Mukim Sukang =

Mukim of Brunei

Coordinates: 4°20′08″N 114°40′00″E

- Mukim
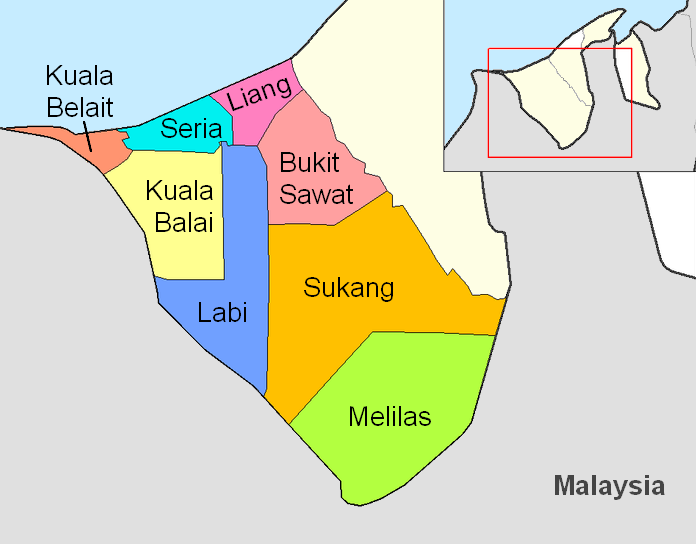
- Sukang is in orange.
- Country: Brunei
- District: Belait

Government
  - Penghulu: Mohammad Abdullah

Area
  - Total: 821.245 km^{2} (317.084 sq mi)

Population (2021)
  - Total: 81
  - Density: 0.099/km^{2} (0.26/sq mi)
- Time zone: UTC+8 (BNT)
- Postcode: KGxx39

Mukim Sukang is a mukim in Belait District, Brunei. The population was 169 in 2016.

== Geography ==
The mukim is located in Ulu Belait (interior part of Belait District). It borders Mukim Bukit Sawat to the north, Mukim Rambai of Tutong District to the north-east, the Malaysian state of Sarawak to the east and south-east, Mukim Melilas to the south and Mukim Labi to the west. It is largely covered with the greenery of the forest, flora and fauna. Sukang recorded the highest temperature in history of Brunei with 39.2 °C (102.6 °F) in July 2025.

== Demographics ==
As of 2016 census, the population of Mukim Sukang comprised 87 males and 82 females. The mukim had 36 households occupying 20 dwellings. The entire population lived in rural areas.

== Administration ==
As of 2021, the mukim comprises the following populated villages:

Settlements	Population (2021)	Ketua kampung (2024)
Kampong Apak-Apak	0	—N/a
Kampong Kukub	19	—N/a
Kampong Sukang	57	—N/a
Kampong Dungun	5	—N/a

== Villages ==
=== Kampong Sukang ===
Kampong Sukang is a village located at the far end of the villages under the catchment area of Mukim Sukang. To get there it takes 1 hour 40 minutes from Sungai Liang subject to road conditions and weather by using a four-wheel drive car. If using a boat from Sungai Mau (Mau River) it will take 2 hours. In this village there is also an Islamic Cemetery for the Muslim residents of Mukim Sukang and Melilas. The area of Mukim Sukang is constantly monitored by the relevant parties including the Royal Brunei Armed Forces (RBAF) and the Royal Brunei Police Force (RBPF) since its location is far in the hinterland of Kuala Belait to prevent unwanted things from happening either from outside or inside the border such as agarwood thieves and so on. The authorities always patrol the areas in question and there is also a police post to maintain the security of the district. This village also has a primary school called Sekolah Rendah Datu Maharaja Setia Dian, Sukang and three teachers' houses near the school. There is a Health Clinic to provide health services to the residents of this subdistrict to receive health checkups.

== Economy ==
Most of the residents of these longhouses practice a type of self-sustaining economy such as farming, cultivating rice fields, fruits and producing handicrafts. The residents of this mukim are very creative in producing handicrafts such as woven baskets from rattan, bamboo and wood such as making takiding, ulu pemarang, gagawi, candas, tindulang (tudung saji), nyiru and others as mukim products. The products are not only displayed in the houses of the village chiefs and also in long houses and also in expos or exhibitions held in the Belait District. Towards moving this One Village One Product (1K1P) Program, Mukim Sukang has established its own Majlis Perundingan Mukim (MPM) which plays the role of a driving force and is a catalyst for grassroots leadership.

== Infrastructure ==
Although it is far inland, it does not mean that Mukim Sukang is marginalized compared to other villages in Belait District. The provision of the best basic facilities for the community is the main agenda of the government and has not been neglected. The government provided basic facilities such as roads where the road in Kampung Buau leading to Kampung Biadong has already been upgraded while the rest is still in the process of being upgraded. Bukit Bang Taong water tank that has been completed will supply clean water for the use of residents who previously used boiled river water for drinking and cooking.

A Multi-Purpose Hall and Government Guest House located in Kampung Sukang which are often used by visitors who spend the night in this village which is equipped with basic facilities such as water and electricity generated through a generator. There is a worship hall in Kampong Sukang which is equipped with toilets, ablution facilities, generators and priests' rooms. The new brothers are also given Islamic religious guidance and assistance such as generators, basic needs through MUIB and the Islamic Da'wah Center.
