= Southern Ladan Hills =

Important Bird Area in Brunei

Coordinates: 04°13′59″N 114°47′59″E

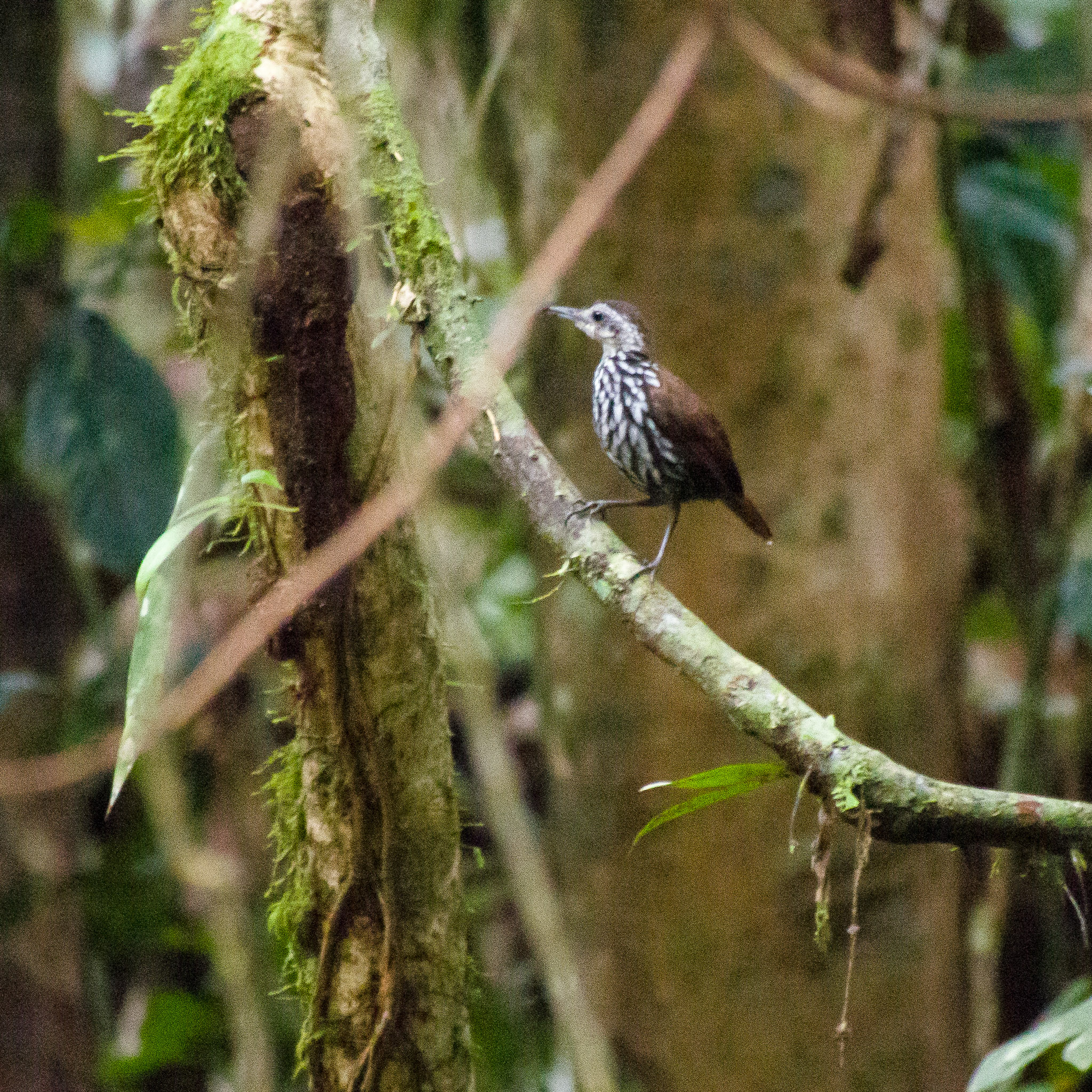
Bornean wren-babblers, classified as vulnerable, are resident in the IBA.

The Southern Ladan Hills comprise a tract of some 25,000 ha of forested land in the interior of the Belait and Tutong Districts of Brunei, in north-western Borneo, which has been identified by BirdLife International as an Important Bird Area (IBA). Lying at an altitude of 100–300 m, it contains mixed dipterocarp, lower montane, tropical heath and limestone forest. It lies along the international border between Brunei and the Malaysian state of Sarawak, and is contiguous with the Gunung Mulu and Gunung Buda National Parks there.

== Birds ==
The site was identified as an IBA because it supports significant numbers of the populations of various threatened bird species, including black partridges, Bornean crestless firebacks, large green pigeons, short-toed coucals, Storm's storks, Wallace's hawk-eagles, Malay blue-banded kingfishers, blue-headed pittas, hook-billed and straw-headed bulbuls, Bornean wren-babblers and large-billed blue-flycatchers.
