= Belait District Museum =

Museum in Kuala Belait, Brunei

- Muzium Daerah Belait
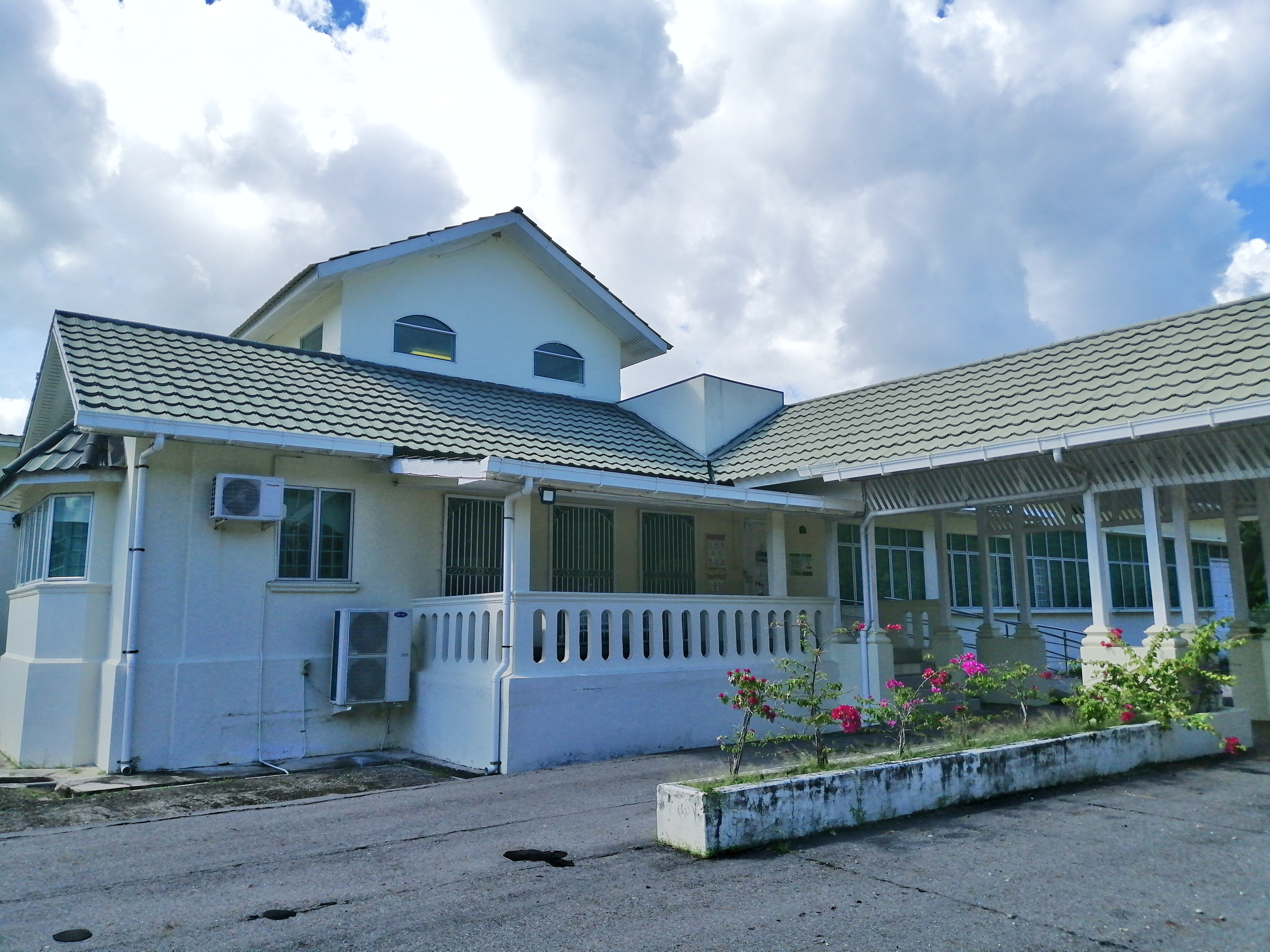
- Belait District Museum
- Established: 23 July 2016; 9 years ago
- Location: Kuala Belait, Belait District, Brunei
- Coordinates: 4°35′20″N 114°11′28″E
- Type: Local museum
- Collections: Cultural Heritage Gallery; History Gallery
- Director: Erdi Herman Tiban
- Website: museums.gov.bn

Belait District Museum (Malay: Muzium Daerah Belait) is a cultural and history museum located at Jalan Maulana, Kuala Belait, Belait District of Brunei.

== Design ==
The building took up 6 acres (2.4 ha) of land with a blending architecture of both local Malay and Colonial. The roofing styles were belah bumbung and potong limas.

== History ==
The building itself was built in 1938. During Sultan Hassanal Bolkiah's visit to the district in conjunction to his birthday, the building's banqueting hall was used. It was used as the official residence for the Deputy (Assistant) British Resident and later became the official residence of the Belait District Officers until 1990. The first district officer to be residence in this building was Pengiran Abu Bakar, additionally he was the first local to be appointed Deputy British Resident. Mohd Kassim Johan was the last district officer to be resident in the building before being relocated to the present day building. In the 1970s, it was expanded to host larger number of people.

In 2006, it became a historical monument for the district under the Antiquities and Treasure Trove Act 1967. The building was renovated in 2011 and open as a museum on 23 July 2016. The open day was organized by the Museums Department under the Ministry of Culture, Youth and Sports.

== Exhibits ==
There are five galleries. Four for permanent exhibitions and one reserved for temporary exhibitions. It includes:

- Cultural Heritage (Galeri Warisan Budaya)
- History of the Administration and Development of the Belait District (Galeri Sejarah)
- History of the Oil and Gas Industry
- Natural Heritage (Galeri Warisan Alam Semula Jadi)
- temporary exhibitions

== Gallery ==
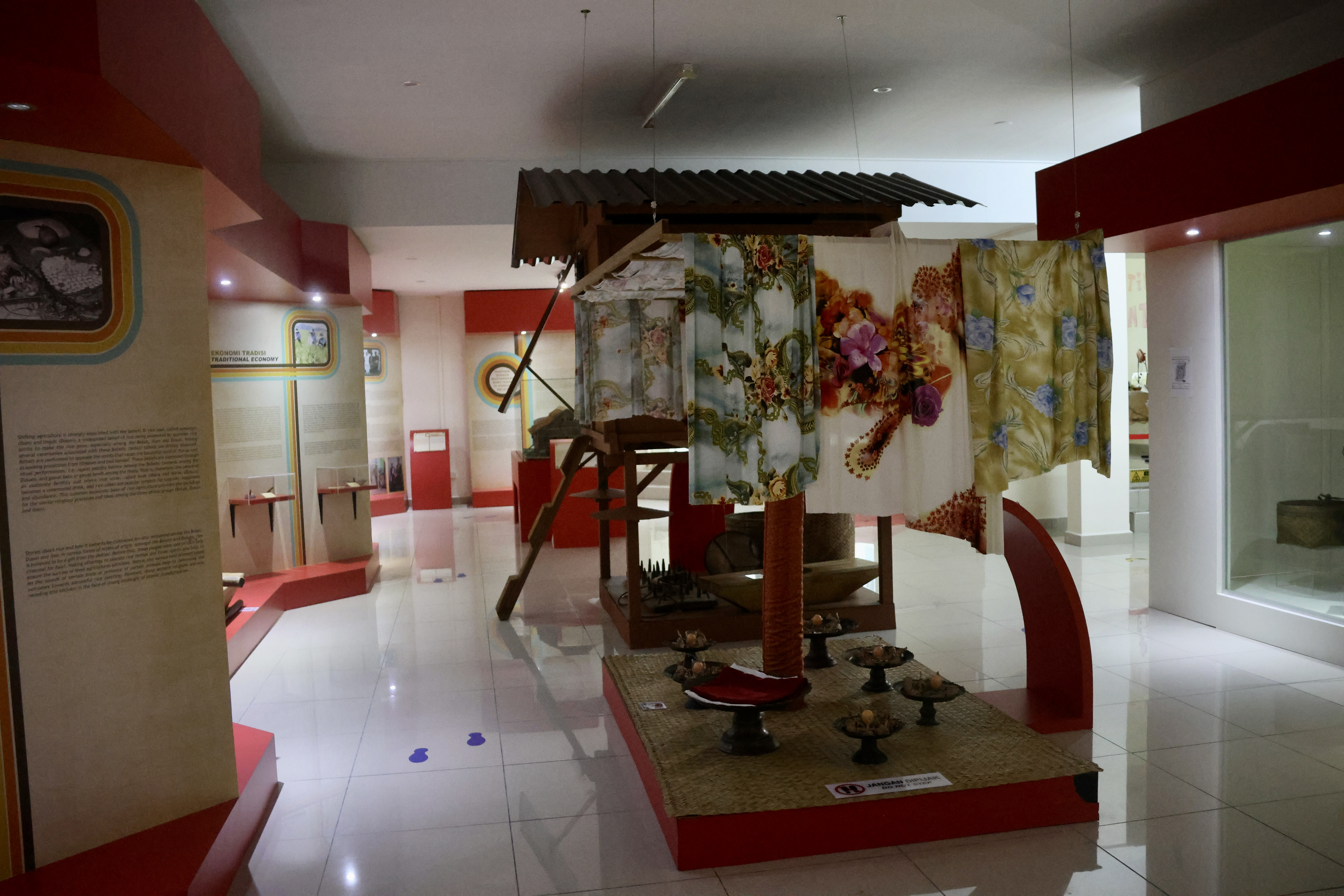
Cultural Heritage

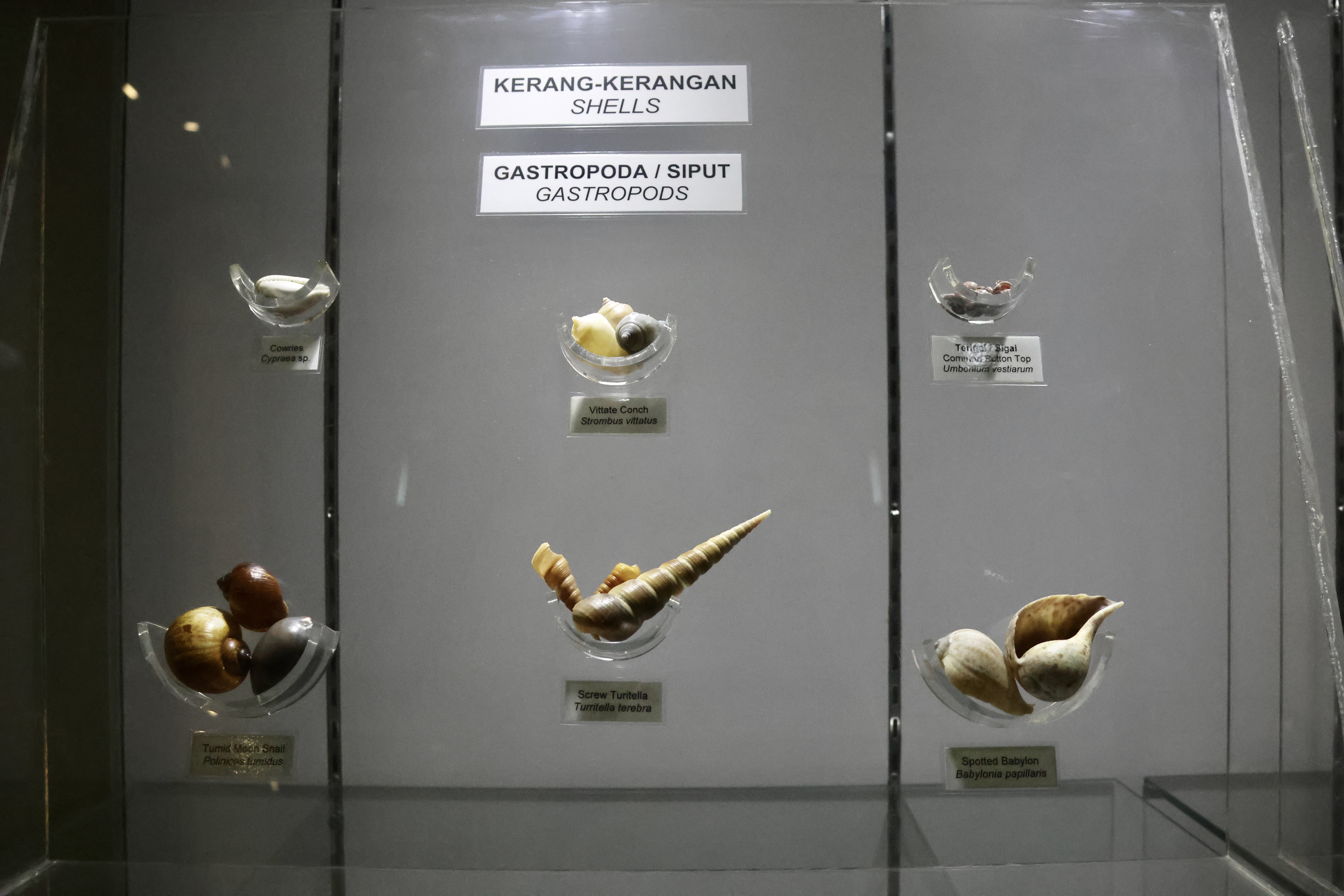
Natural Heritage

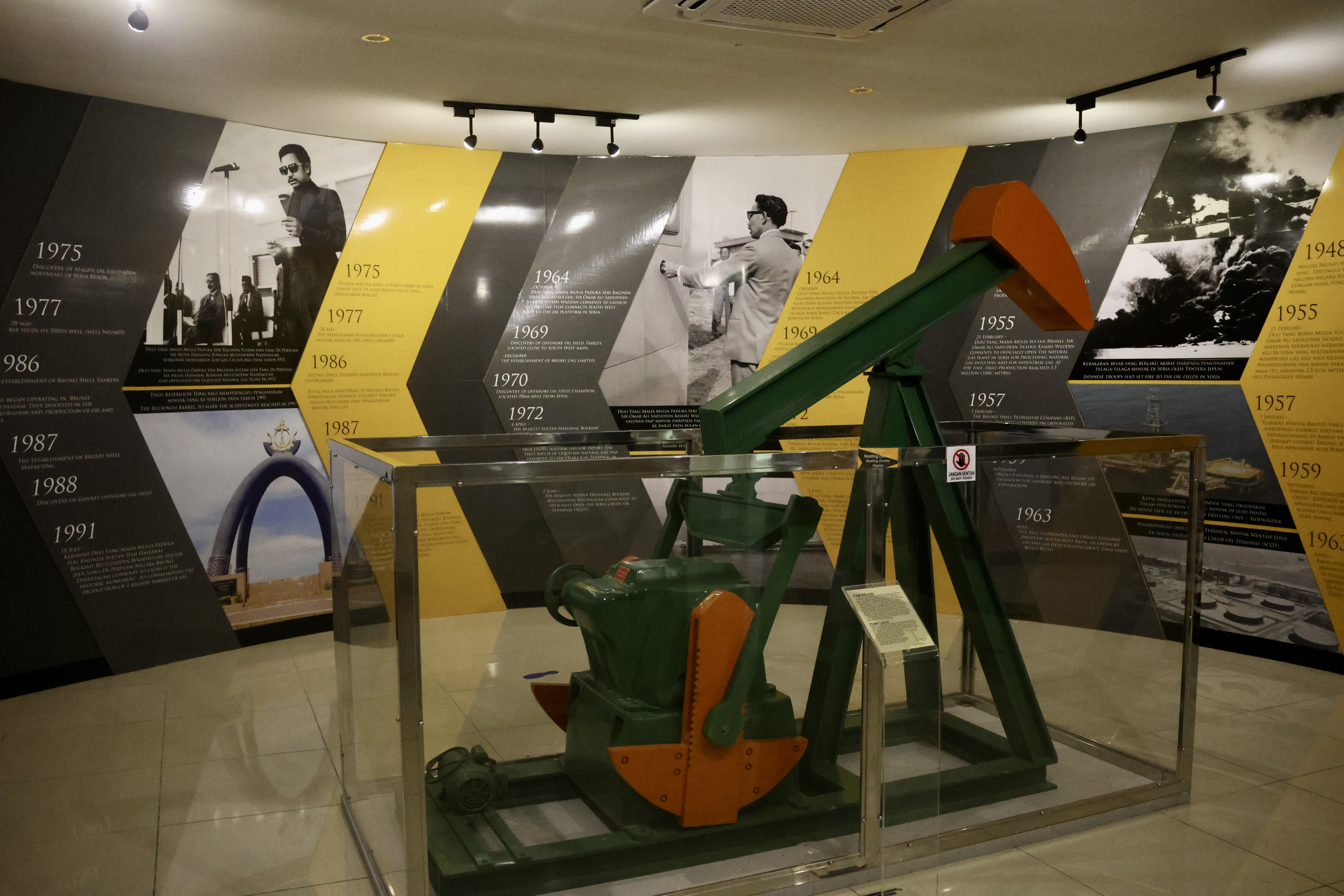
History of the Oil and Gas Industry

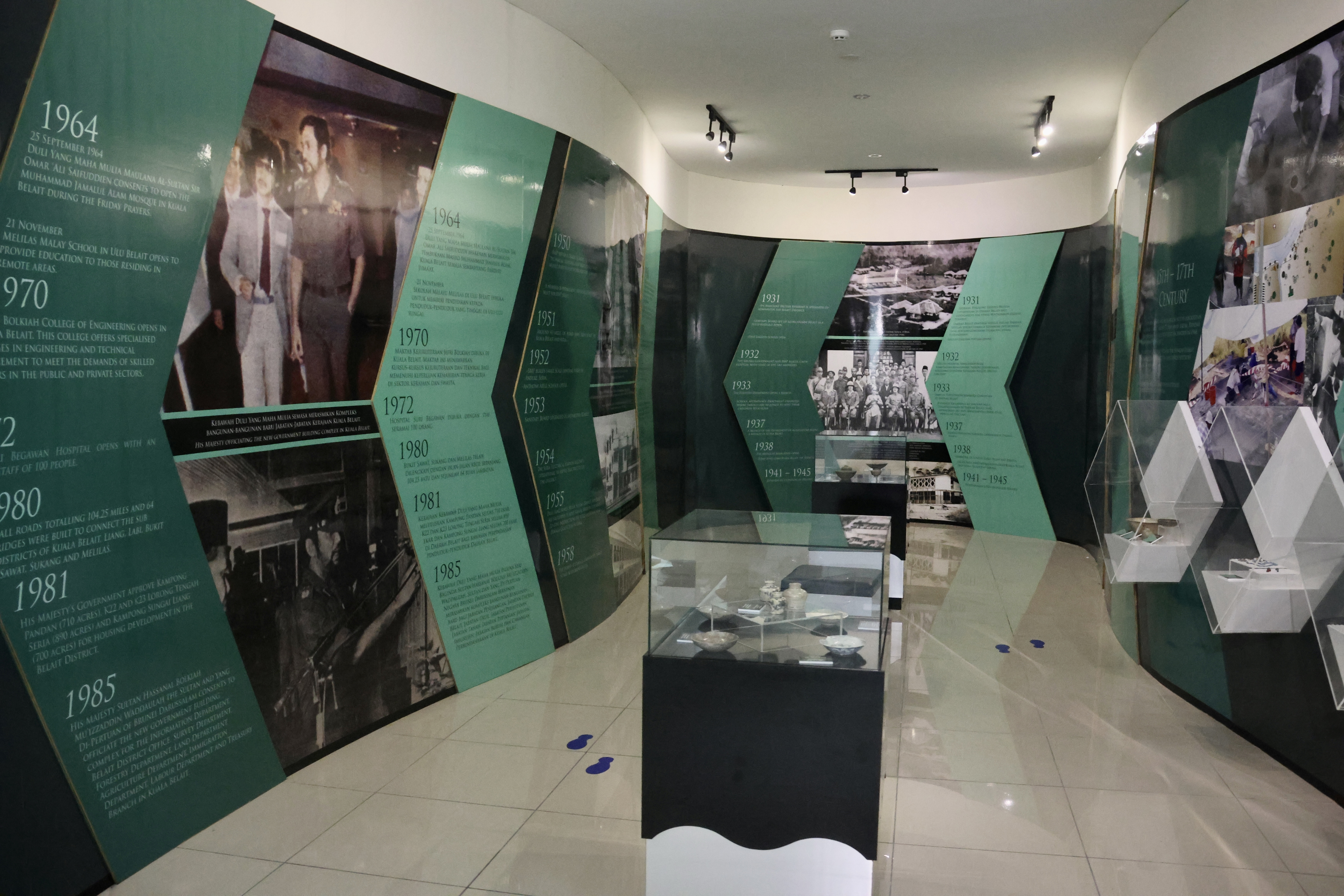
History of the Administration and Development of the Belait District

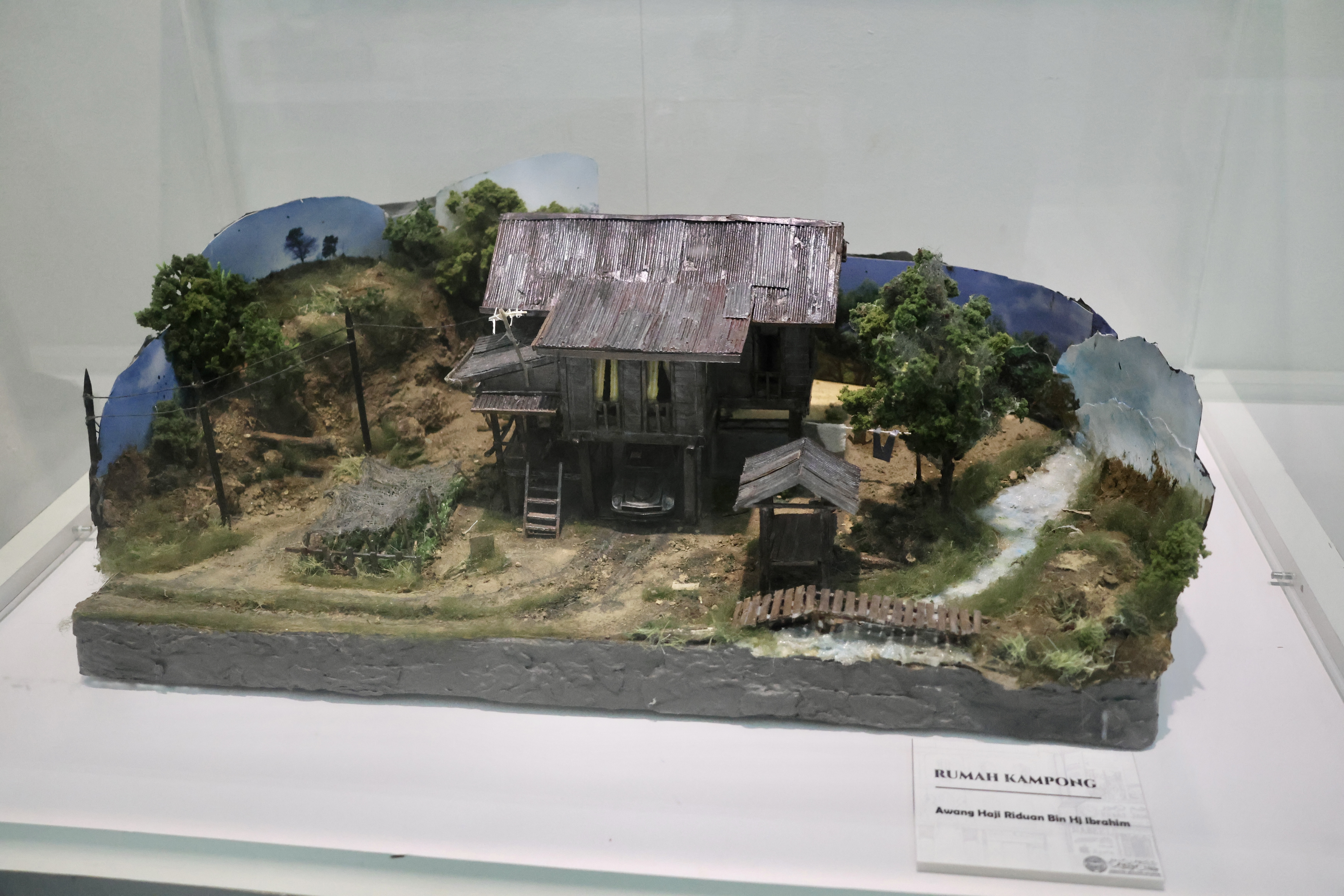
Temporary exhibitions

== See also ==
- List of museums in Brunei
