= Belait District =

District of Brunei

Coordinates: 4°25′N 114°35′E

Belait District Daerah Belait (Malay) داءيره بلاءيت (Jawi)
- District
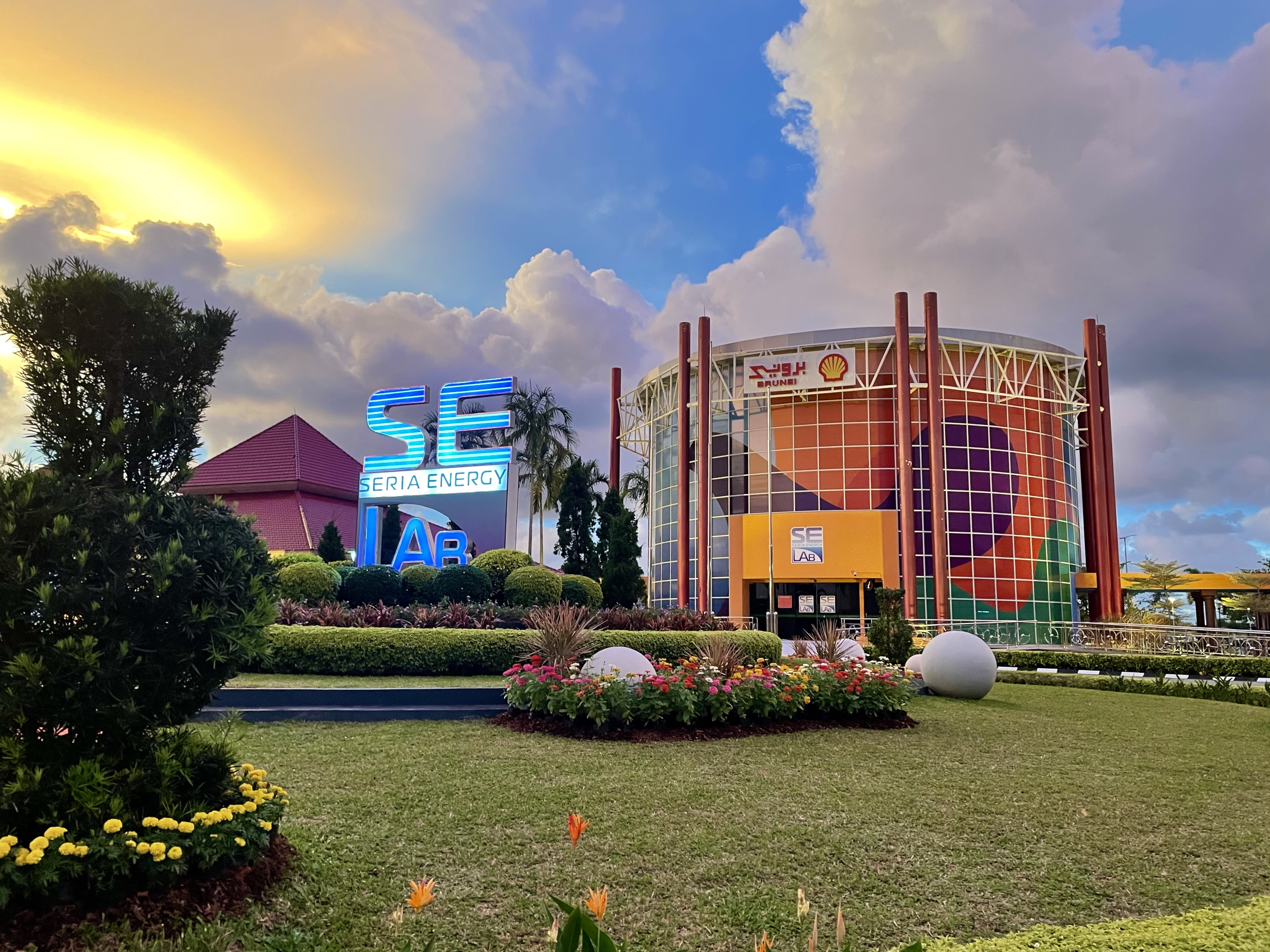
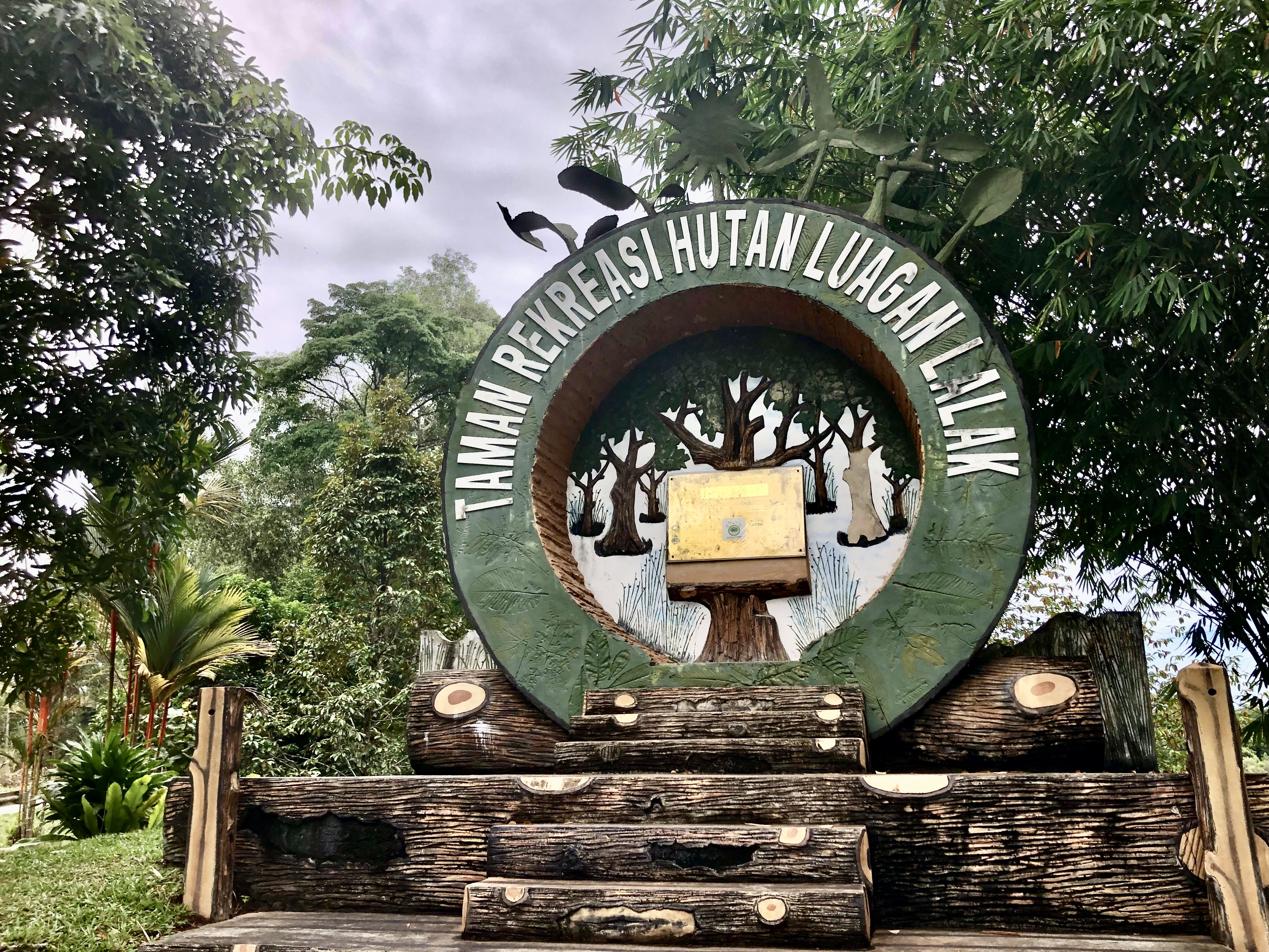
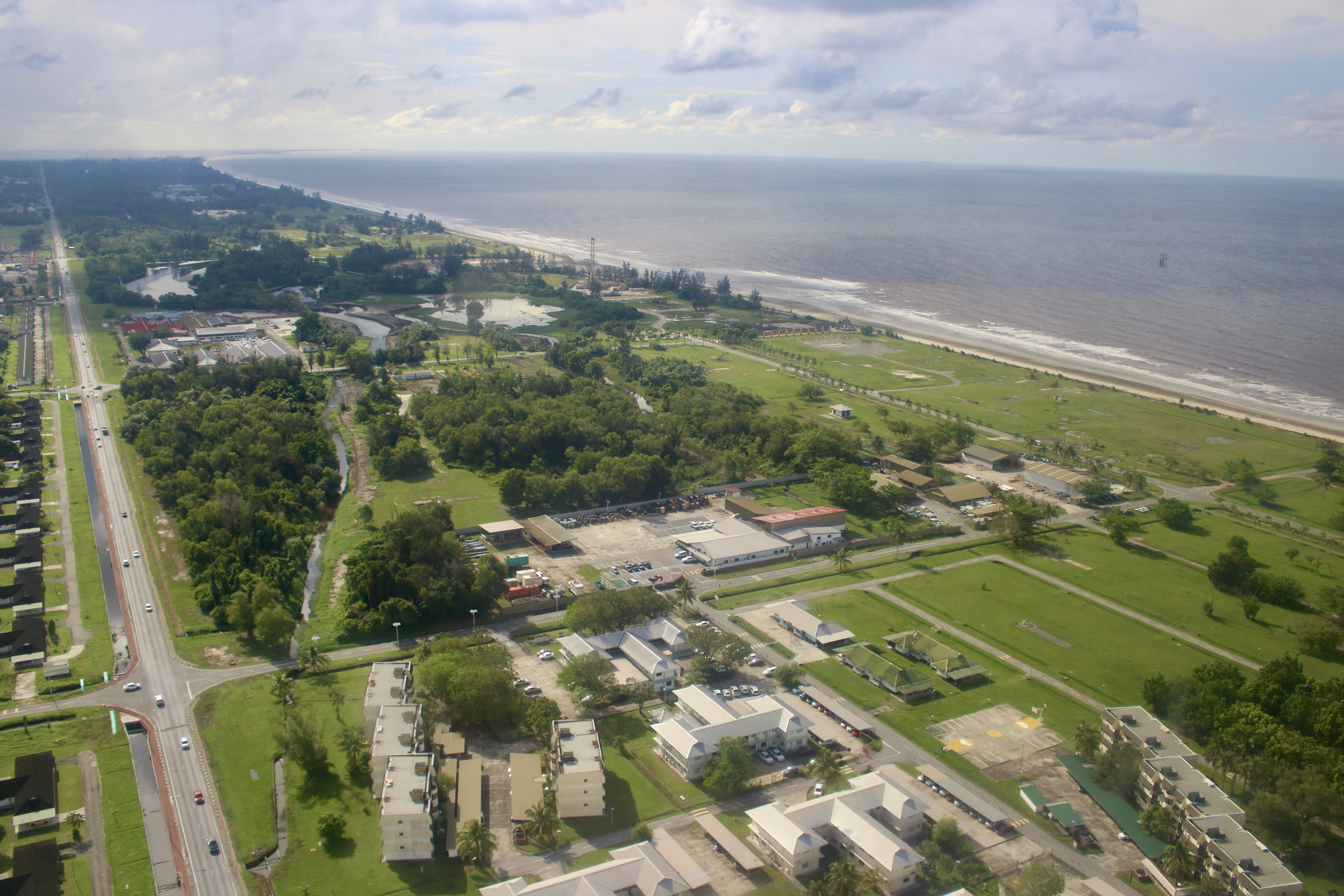
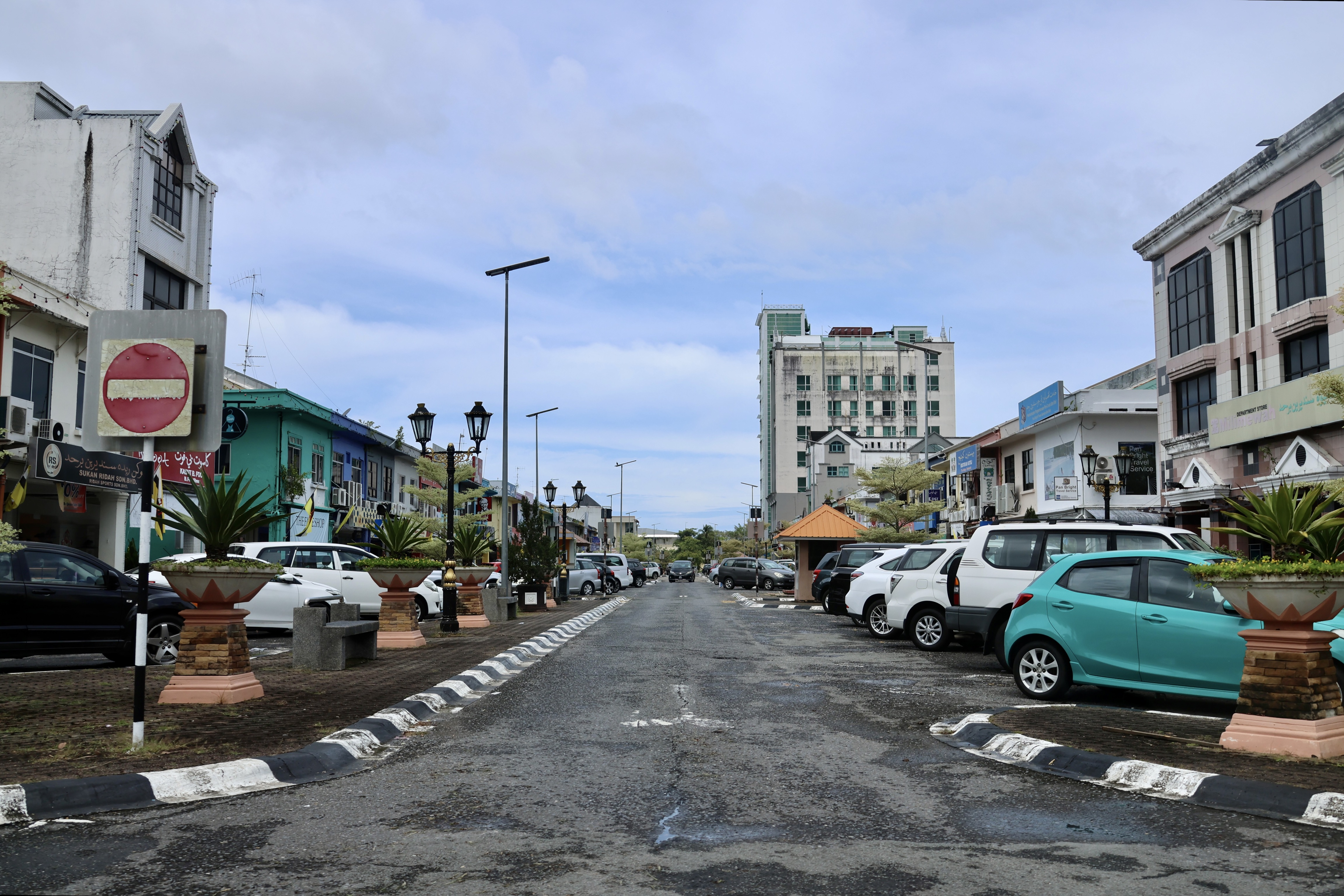
- Clockwise from top left: Seria Energy Lab, Luagan Lala Forest Recreation Park, Kuala Belait town, Seria coast

- Country: Brunei
- Administrative centre: Kuala Belait
- Mukims: 8 (see Mukims)

Government
  - Type: Municipality
  - Body: Belait District Office
  - DO: Amirol Hafidzin (Acting)

Area
  - Total: 2,727 km^{2} (1,053 sq mi)
  - Rank: 1st in Brunei
- Highest elevation: 417 m (1,368 ft)

Population (2025)
  - Total: 67,900
  - Rank: 2nd in Brunei
  - Density: 24.9/km^{2} (64.5/sq mi)
- Time zone: UTC+8 (BNT)
- Postcode: K
- Area code: 3
- Website: www.belait.gov.bn

Belait District (Malay: Daerah Belait; Jawi: داءيره بلاءيت) or simply known as Belait (buh-LEIT; Malay: [bəlait]), is the largest as well as the westernmost district in Brunei. It has an area of 2,727 square kilometres (1,053 sq mi) and the population of 65,531 as of 2021. The administrative town is Kuala Belait, located at the mouth of the 32 kilometres (20 mi) long Belait River. The district is commonly associated with the oil and gas industry of the country, mainly concentrated near the town of Seria.

== Geography ==
The South China Sea borders Belait District to the north, Tutong District to the northeast, and Sarawak, Malaysia to the west and south. The district's lowlands are steep and below an elevation of 91 metres (299 ft). Areas along the shore, which are mostly characterised by marshy plains with slender alluvial valleys that extend to the major rivers, are the exception. Bukit Teraja, the district's highest point, stands at 417 meters.

With multiple offshore installations and pipeline connections, the district is situated on the northwest coast of Borneo, is a vital hub for the nation's oil and gas sector. The Belait River, the longest river in the nation's four major river systems, has an impact on the district's coastal waters as it empties into the South China Sea. The presence of oil and gas infrastructure, which are encircled by a buffer zone of one nautical mile prohibiting fishing, limits the area's fishing opportunities in both shallow and deeper seas. The district covers 2,727 square kilometres (1,053 sq mi). There are a few known groundwater reserves in the Sungai Liang and Seria regions.

As of 1992, 18,418 hectares of Brunei's mangrove forests were being modestly exploited for firewood, charcoal, and commercially for building poles, with Belait District contributing 3% (533 hectares (1,320 acres)). Ceriops tagal was cultivated only in Belait, while Rhizophora apiculata and Nypa fruticans were the most common species in Brunei–Muara, Belait, and Tutong. In Belait, Melastoma malabathricum was the most associated species, and Rhizophora apiculata had the highest regeneration rate with 3,540 seedlings per hectare. The Belait Swamp Forest has been identified by BirdLife International as an Important Bird Area.

== History ==
Following numerous similar cessions to Sarawak and the British North Borneo Company, the District of Sarawak was ceded to Sir James Brooke in 1841. As a result, the State of Brunei was reduced to approximately 2,226 square miles, with a pre-1947 population of 40,670 (based on preliminary census figures for 1947). The State was made up a few outlying districts, the most significant of which are Belait, Tutong, and Temburong. Brunei's foreign affairs were taken over by the British government in 1888, and in 1905 the monarchy nominated a British Resident to help with management. The Assistant Resident post was reinstated in response to the oil discoveries in the Belait District in order to handle the region's growing demand.

A British Resident, serving as the high commissioner under the Governor of Sarawak, is in charge of Bruneian government. Advice from the Resident was needed on all issues, with the exception of those pertaining to the Islamic faith. Under the direction of the British Resident, four administrative districts were overseen by Malay district officers. Heads of state departments, including agriculture, public works, and medicine, are European officials on secondment; the Assistant Resident oversees the department of education at the moment. Local sanitation and related issues are overseen by sanitary boards in Brunei Town, Tutong, and Kuala Belait.

== Administration ==
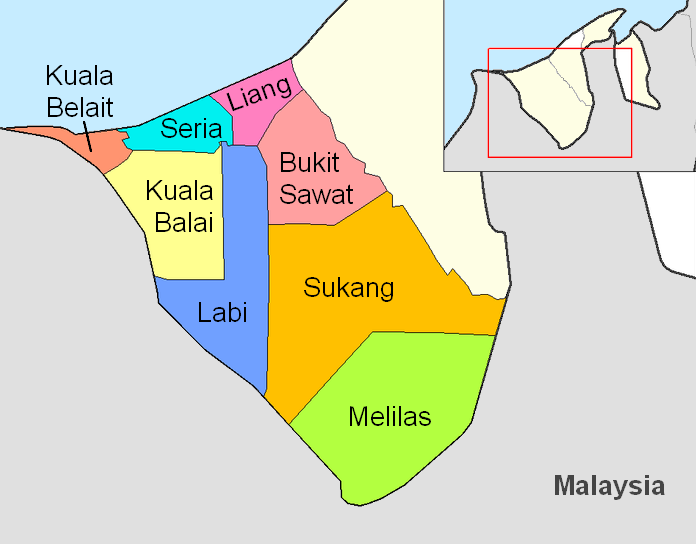

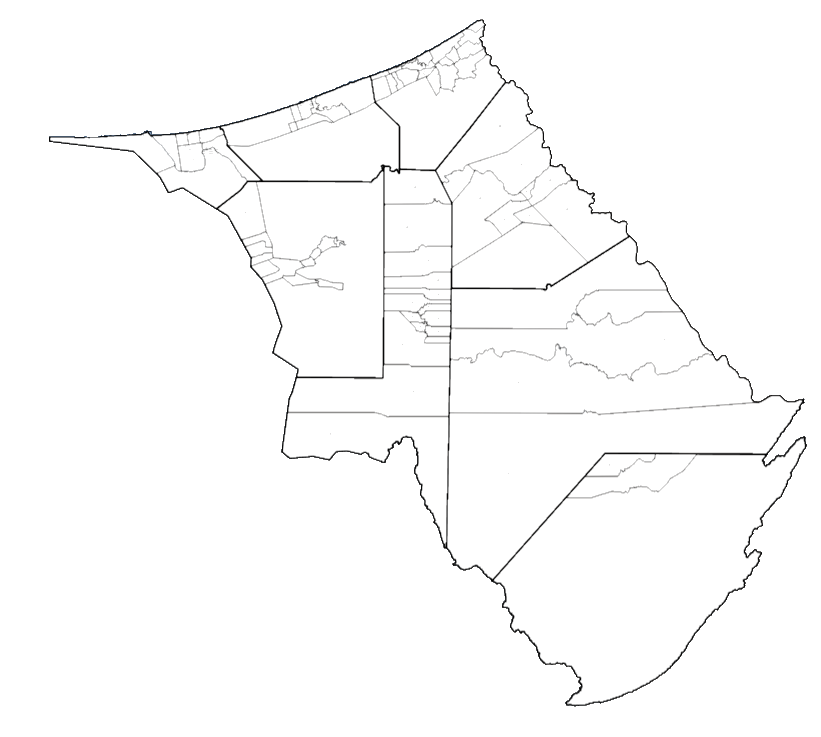
Mukims and kampongs of Belait

Starting at the intersection of Lorong Tengah and Jalan Tengah, the declaration of the 1959 Kuala Belait and Seria (Municipal Board Areas) Declaration, delineates the precise boundaries of the Seria Municipal Board Area. It then proceeds to follow a number of roads and crossroads, culminating in the formation of the municipality's specified boundary. Furthermore, in accordance with the Third Schedule, prior notices concerning these limits are withdrawn. The boundaries of the Kuala Belait and Seria Municipal Board Areas have been redrawn by this decree. The region of Oil Well No. 22 is currently included in the Seria Municipal Board region.

The Kuala Belait Municipal Board Area's limits have been altered by the Sultan-in-Council's 1974 Declaration (Municipal Board Area) Amendment. It delineates the new region on the east bank of the Belait River and supersedes the First Schedule of the 1959 Declaration. The region starts from a position on the Belait River estuary, travels north toward the China Sea, and passes by certain locations, such as the Istana Manggalela and the sewage disposal facility owned by Brunei Shell Petroleum (BSP), before circling back along the Belait River to the beginning point.

The procedures for the board's business conduct are outlined in the Kuala Belait and Seria Municipal Board (Standing Orders) By-Laws, 2014. Meeting procedures, such as notification requirements, quorum requirements, and the responsibilities of the chairman and secretary, are outlined in the bylaws. Members must adhere to certain voting and speaking procedures, and meetings must begin with a prayer. The chairman is in charge of the meeting, and every motion needs to be submitted in writing and seconded before it can be discussed. These bylaws guarantee the Municipal Board's organised and orderly governance.

The district is administered by the Belait District Office (Jabatan Daerah Belait), a government department under the Ministry of Home Affairs. The district is subdivided into 8 mukims, namely:

Mukim	Population (2021)	Penghulu (2024)
Bukit Sawat	759	Haji Md. Salleh bin Haji Othman
Kuala Balai	16	—N/a
Kuala Belait	28,793	Haji Abdul Afiq bin Zainuddin
Labi	727	Muhammad Nurazri bin Haji Abdul Mustafah
Liang	16,813	Haji Mohamad Yamin bin Haji Abdul Ranni
Seria	18,313	Haji Sadin bin Haji Ibrahim
Melilas	29	Mohammad bin Abdullah @ Lim Swee Ann
Sukang	81	Mohammad bin Abdullah @ Lim Swee Ann

These are further subdivided into 83 Kampongs (Villages).

According to the Constitution, the district is to be represented in the Legislative Council, the state legislature, by up to 3 members. As of 2023, two members have been appointed to represent the district in the legislature.

== Demographics ==
Malay, Chinese, and other indigenous communities like the Dusun and Murut make up its population. The majority of people live in Seria and the main town of Kuala Belait. Due to homes provided by BSP and the British Forces Brunei, as well as recreational amenities, the Panaga area in the district is home to a significant expat population.

Despite their varied cultural histories and original non-Muslim status, seven indigenous ethnic groups—including the Belait people—were merged into a single Malay identity in 1961 with the passage of the Nationality Act. Consequently, the Belait and other communities are now acknowledged as Malays by the government, adding to Brunei's complex Malay identity. Some notable non-Muslim minorities including the Belait people maintain their historical customs in spite of Islam's supremacy. In 2022, Eid al-Fitr and Adau Gayoh were jointly celebrated in Belait District, which represent the blending of national identity with ancient rituals and promote unity, have become more common in public settings in recent years.

=== Religion ===
Religions in Belait district (2016)
Religion	Percent
Islam	66.89%
Christianity	11.57%
Buddhism	12.76%
Other or not stated	8.78%

Islam is the most followed religion in Belait District, with notable Christian and Buddhist minorities. A significant portion of the population also identifies with other or unspecified beliefs.

== Transportation ==
=== Road ===
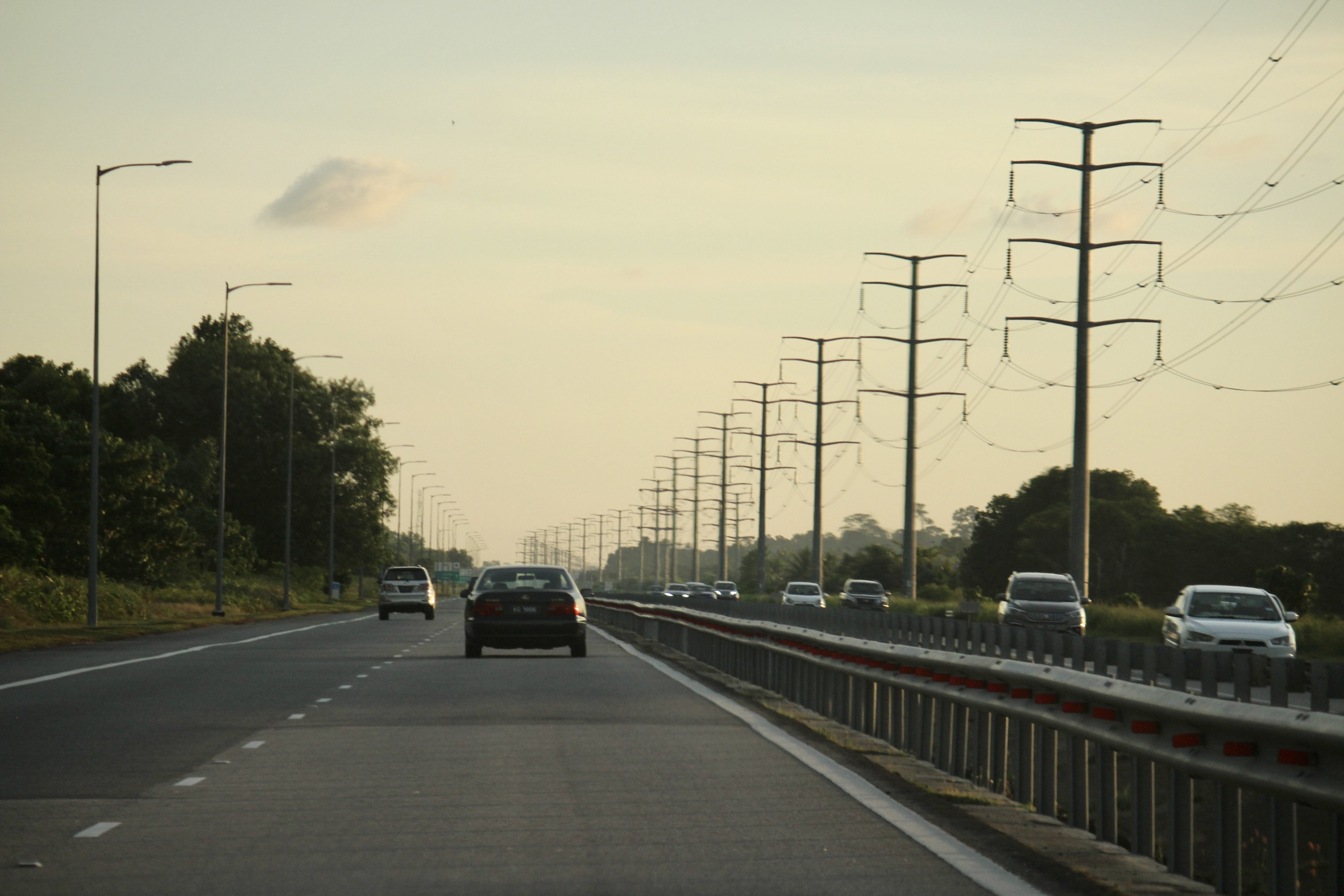
Seria–Belait Highway

The government has invested approximately B$600 million in the 2007–2012 National Development Plan (RKN) to enhance road networks, including highway projects, paving, maintenance, and resurfacing. Notable projects in Belait under the RKN include upgrading Jalan Tutong–Seria (Lumut) phase 2, Jalan Sungai Mau/Merangking/Buau, high-density roads, and wooden bridge replacements, along with the construction of the Seria By-Pass second lane and widening roads on Jalan Singa Menteri.

The Rasau Bridge connects the district to Sungai Tujoh and Miri in Sarawak, Malaysia to the west, while the Seria/Lumut bypass connects it to the Muara–Tutong Highway to the east. By coastal highways, it takes over an hour to get from Bandar Seri Begawan to Belait District. As of 2022, the district's road network consisted of 923.16 kilometres (573.63 mi), out of which 90.8% were paved.

=== Rail ===
Built by the British Malayan Petroleum Company (now BSP) in the 1930s, a 19.3 kilometres (12.0 mi) narrow gauge railway with a 600 millimetres (24 in) gauge connected Seria to Badas for the transportation of water and subsequently pipeline tubes. Significant portions of the railway were concealed during World War II to keep Japanese soldiers from utilising it. The railway was promptly reactivated to move artillery and ammunition after being freed in July 1945 by the Australian Army's 9th Division. The path between Seria and Badas is now paved, while parts of the track may still exist.

=== Water ===
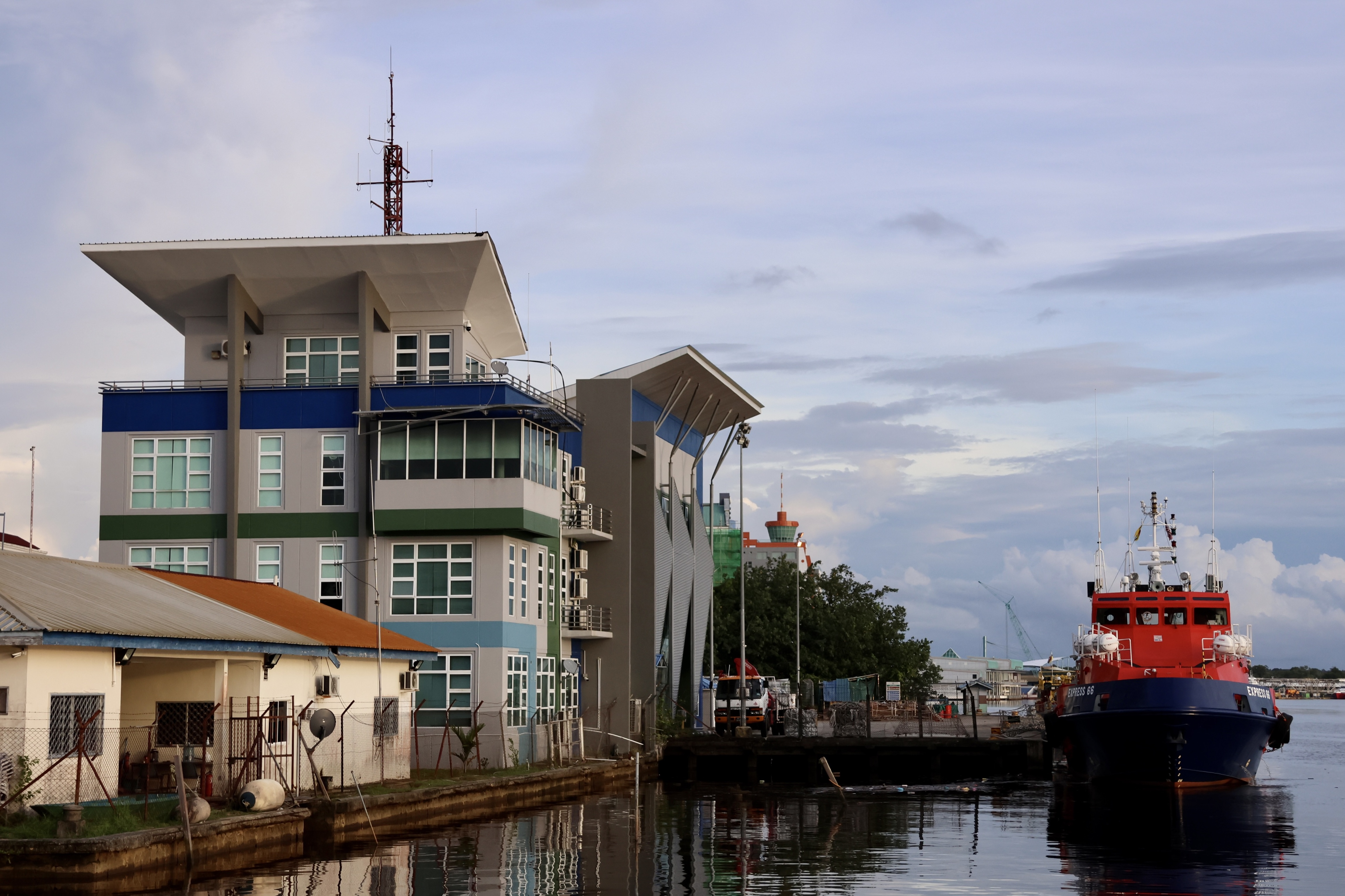
Boats docked at the port

To get upriver towards Kuala Balai, tourists can rent a water taxi at the public dock next to the Kuala Belait market. Additionally, the Kuala Belait Boat Club arranges boat cruises to a number of neighbouring locations. around the past, Rasau had a timber jetty around 1930. One of Brunei's three ports, Kuala Belait Port, features a portion near the river mouth that is administered by BSP and has limited public access. Further upriver in Kampong Sungai Duhon, the commercial port can only handle shallow draft vessels because to silting. At the mouth of the river, two breakwaters have been built to lessen this. The nearest deepwater port in Brunei is Muara Port in Brunei–Muara District.

=== Air ===
A privately owned airstrip at Anduki is mostly used for flights to BSP facilities located offshore. Travelers must go to the Miri Airport or the Brunei International Airport for commercial flights. Panaga Health Centre, BSP Headquarters, and Suri Seri Begawan Hospital all have helipads. Furthermore, military helicopter operations are supported by a heliport at the Medicina Lines' British Army Jungle Warfare Training School, which is run by No. 230 Squadron RAF.

== Economy ==
=== Agriculture ===
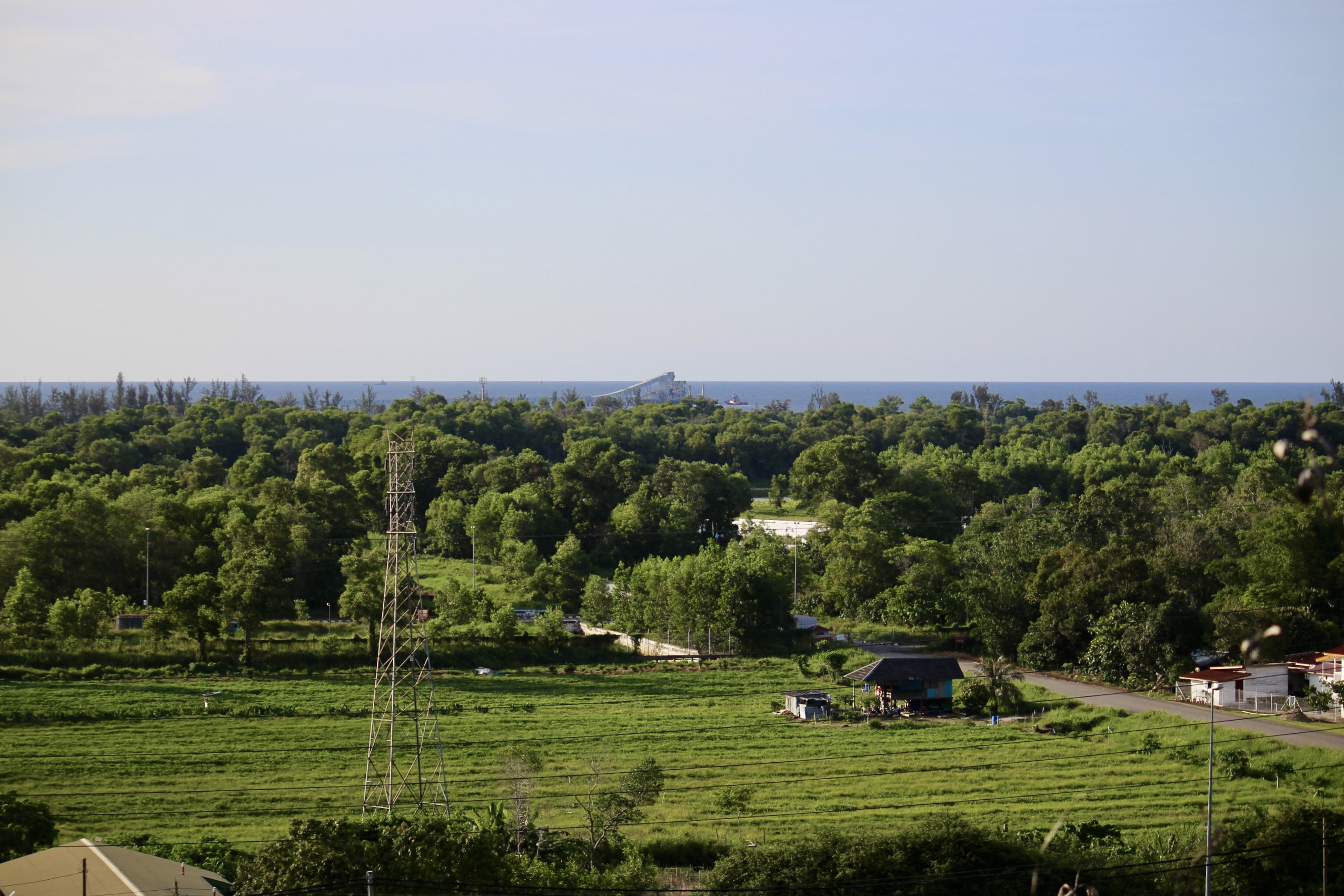

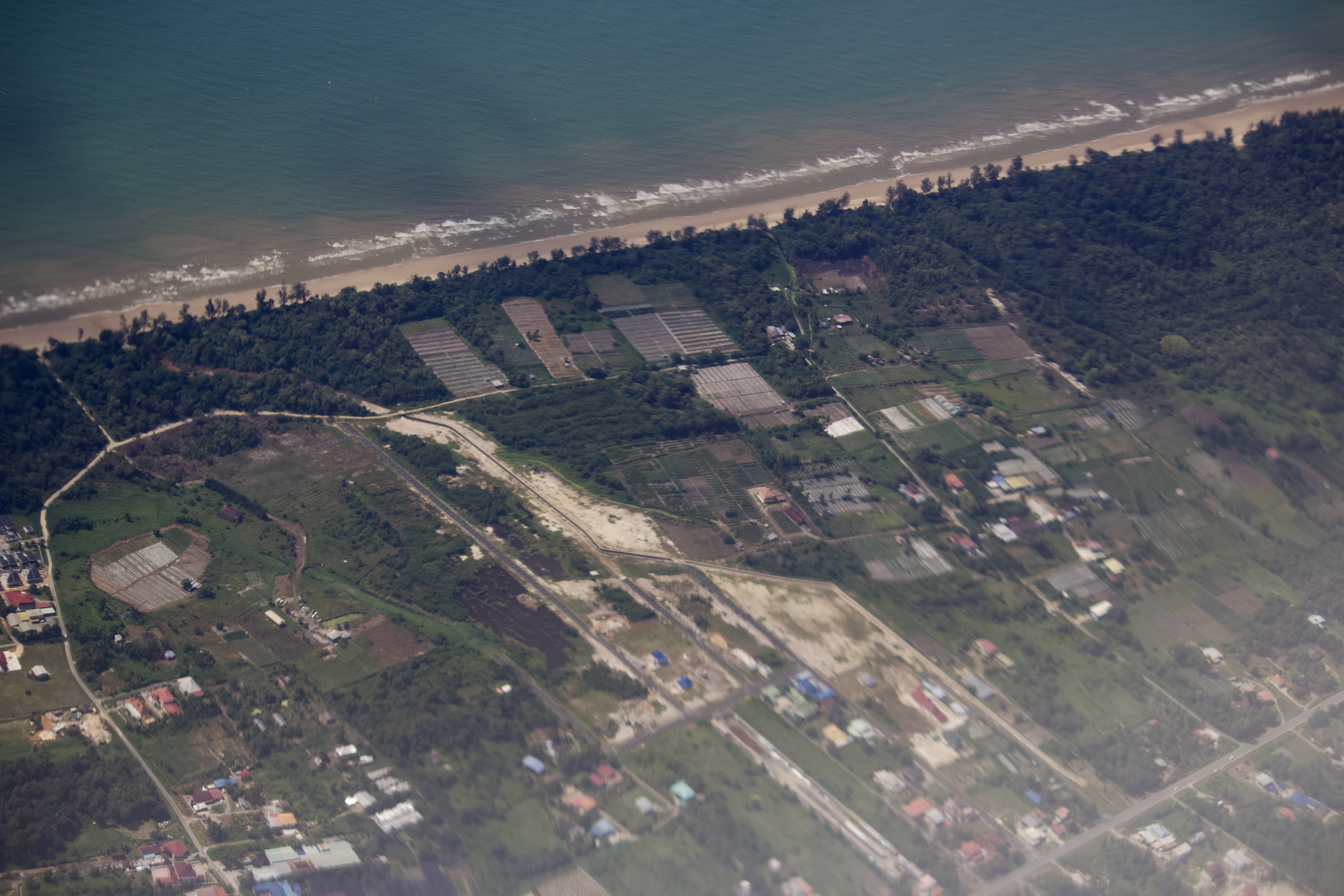
KPP Sungai Liang

In 2022, the Belait District had 1,511.72 hectares of gazetted agricultural development areas, with 1,052.67 hectares allocated to farmers and 269.31 hectares used for stations or other purposes. The district hosts a variety of Agricultural Development Areas (KKP), with a total of 1,511.72 hectares gazetted for agriculture. Of this, 1,052.67 hectares have been allocated to farmers, while 269.31 hectares are used for stations or other purposes. Specific areas include KKP Buau and KKP Kenapol, both dedicated to agriculture stations. KKP Bukit Sawat supports agriculture stations and fruit cultivation, while KKP Sungai Liang is used for fruits and vegetables. KKP Kandol, the largest area, spans 710.00 hectares, with 505.00 hectares for paddy. KKP Labi Lama and KKP Lilas are dedicated to fruits, integrated crops, and miscellaneous farming. KKP Lot Sengkuang A and KKP Merangking focus on paddy cultivation. Additionally, KKP Mumong and KKP Sungai Petai are used for a mix of fruits, vegetables, and livestock activities.

In 2022, the district is the only producer of all local cut flowers. The market was dominated by Orchidaceae, with 48,996 cuts valued at B$41,325, representing 98.6% of the total quantity. Alpinia purpurata, Davallia mariesii, and Heliconia accounted for 0.4%, 0.5%, and 0.1% of the total quantity, respectively. The overall market totalled 49,681 cuts with a retail value of B$41,908.

=== Oil and gas ===
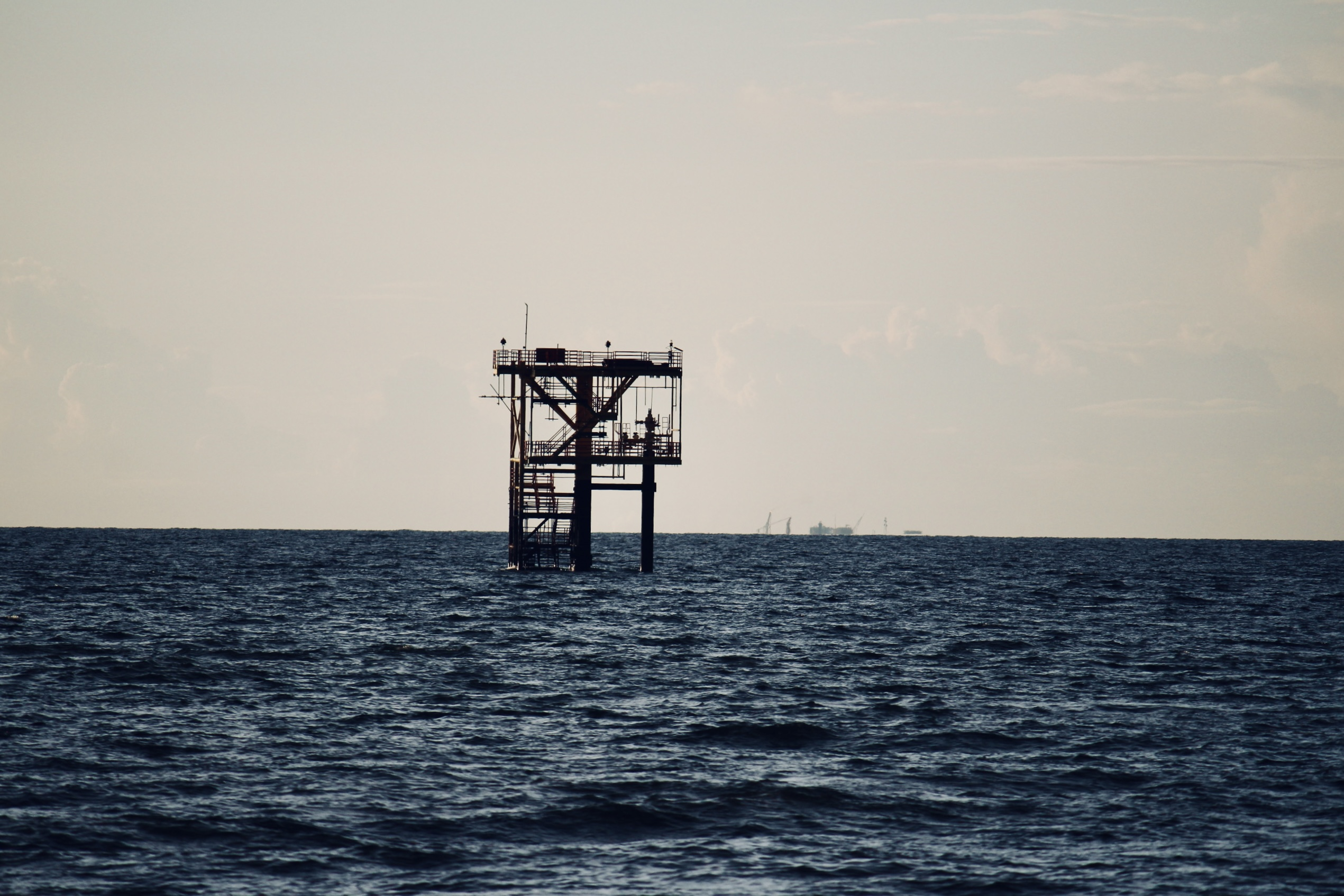
Offshore platforms near Seria

Being the location of Brunei's main natural gas and oil resources, the district is an important area. There, Seria oil field was first found in 1929, and commercial production started in 1932. Rasau is dominated by one of Brunei's two onshore oil fields, operated by BSP, discovered in 1979, and began production in 1983, with wells located primarily between the Rasau Bridge and Sungai Tujoh, as well as on the east side of the Belait River. The gas sector grew significantly as well, and at Lumut, where one of the biggest liquefied natural gas facilities in the world was established by Brunei LNG. In the natural gas sector, the Bruneian government, BSP, and Mitsubishi Corporation are partners, while the oil industry functions as a joint venture between the Bruneian government and the Royal Dutch Shell.

Over half of Brunei's gas reserves and 60% of the company's total production are found at the South West Ampa gas field, which is the oldest and most significant offshore field in the country. It is situated 13 kilometres offshore from Kuala Belait. Gas is routed 39 kilometres to the Brunei LNG facility at Lumut from its 56 wells. The field has 164 producing wells and significant oil reserves. The Gannet and Fairley fields, which are nearby, yield both gas and oil; Fairley has 22 gas wells and 29 oil wells. In addition, the 32 wells in the 60 kilometres northeast of Seria Magpie field have been producing 6,000 barrels of oil a day since 1977. Additionally, BSP shares output from the Fairley–Baram field, which is situated near Sarawak's border. Located 45 km northwest of Seria, BSP found and is projected to produce an estimated 30 million barrels over the course of 15–20 years from the Egret oil field.

=== Petrochemical ===
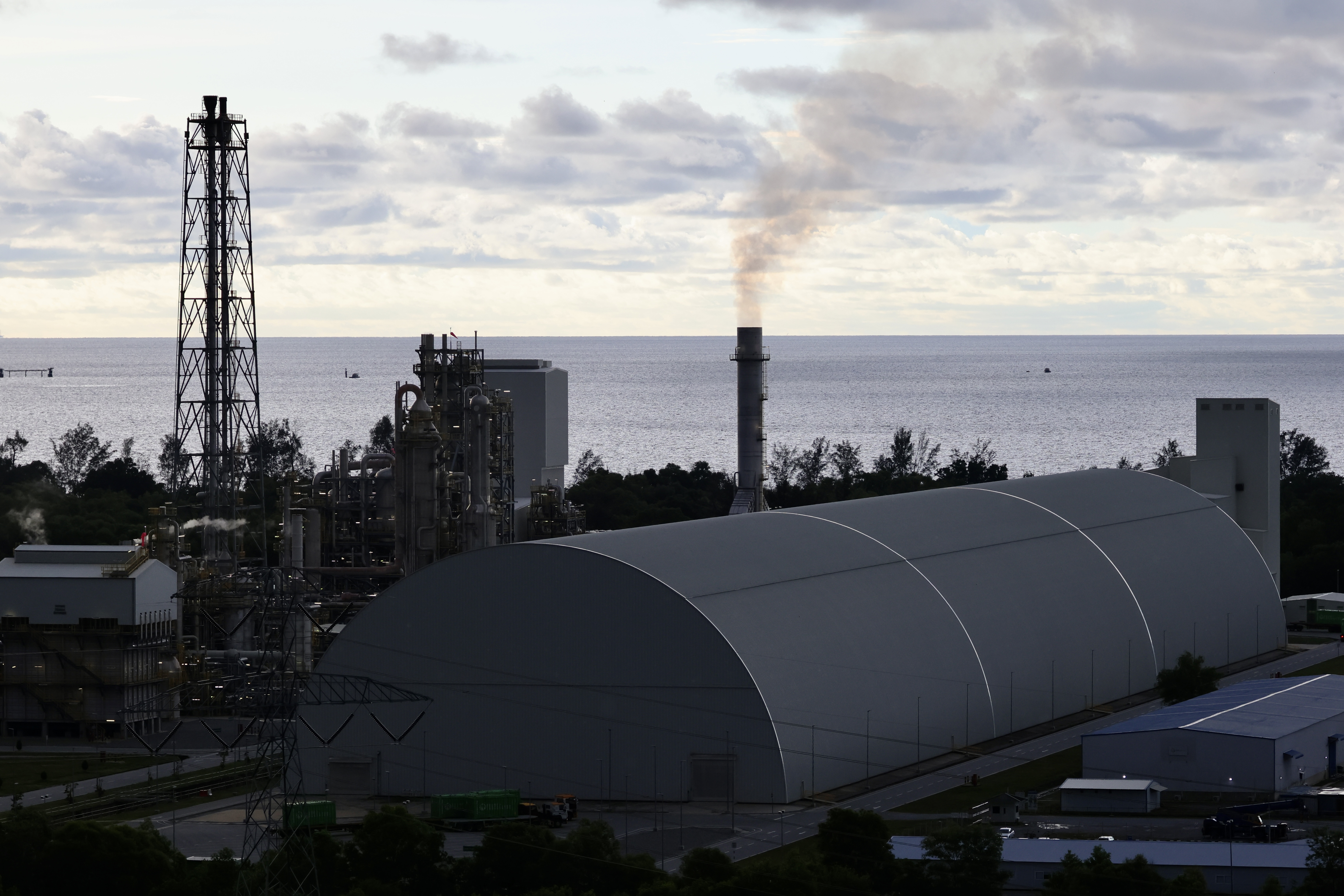
BFI ammonium plant in SPARK

The Sungai Liang Industrial Park (SPARK) has developed an industrial cluster that the Brunei Economic Development Board (BEDB) worked to transform into a premier petrochemical hub. Located on 271 hectares (670 acres), the Brunei Methanol Company (BMC) operates a US$600 million methanol facility, which represents SPARK's first significant investment. BEDB is also taking into account a number of international investors' ideas for further petrochemical projects in the park. Situated in SPARK, Brunei Fertilizer Industries (BFI) is a government-owned enterprise that produces 1,365,000 tons of urea yearly, making it one of the largest fertiliser plant in Southeast Asia.

=== Agrifood ===
In 2022, Belait District utilised 232.27 hectares for livestock, covering a variety of commodities. This included 22.98 hectares for broiler (chicken meat), 16.60 hectares for layer (eggs), 40.00 hectares for day-old chicks, and 0.00 hectares for fertilised eggs. Additionally, 16.37 hectares were used for buffalo, 27.24 hectares for cattle, 58.01 hectares for goats, and 38.75 hectares for sheep. Other livestock areas included 8.42 hectares for miscellaneous livestock. Slaughterhouses occupied 3.90 hectares. The egg industry in the district produced 81.44 million eggs, which accounted for 46.8% of the total production in Brunei. The retail value of these eggs was B$14.20 million. The district have 2 farms involved in the egg production industry.

=== Fisheries ===
In 2021, Belait District produced 0.17 metric tonnes of freshwater fish, with a retail value of B$0.002 million. This accounted for a small fraction of the total production in Brunei. The number of small-scale fishermen varied from 268 in 2015 to 189, with a total of 1,625 fishermen over the seven-year period. With meshes ranging from 4 to 26.5 cm, andang karan is used to catch fish in the open coastal waters near Belait District. Belait (20%), Tutong (15%), and Brunei-Muara District (65%) account for the majority of the licensed full-time fisherman. Currently, artisanal fishermen use seven primary landing locations, two of which are in the Belait District. These fish inhabit mangrove lining of river embankments, river channels, and the seaward edges of the mangrove fringes in the Brunei estuary, which includes the Belait River.

== Development ==
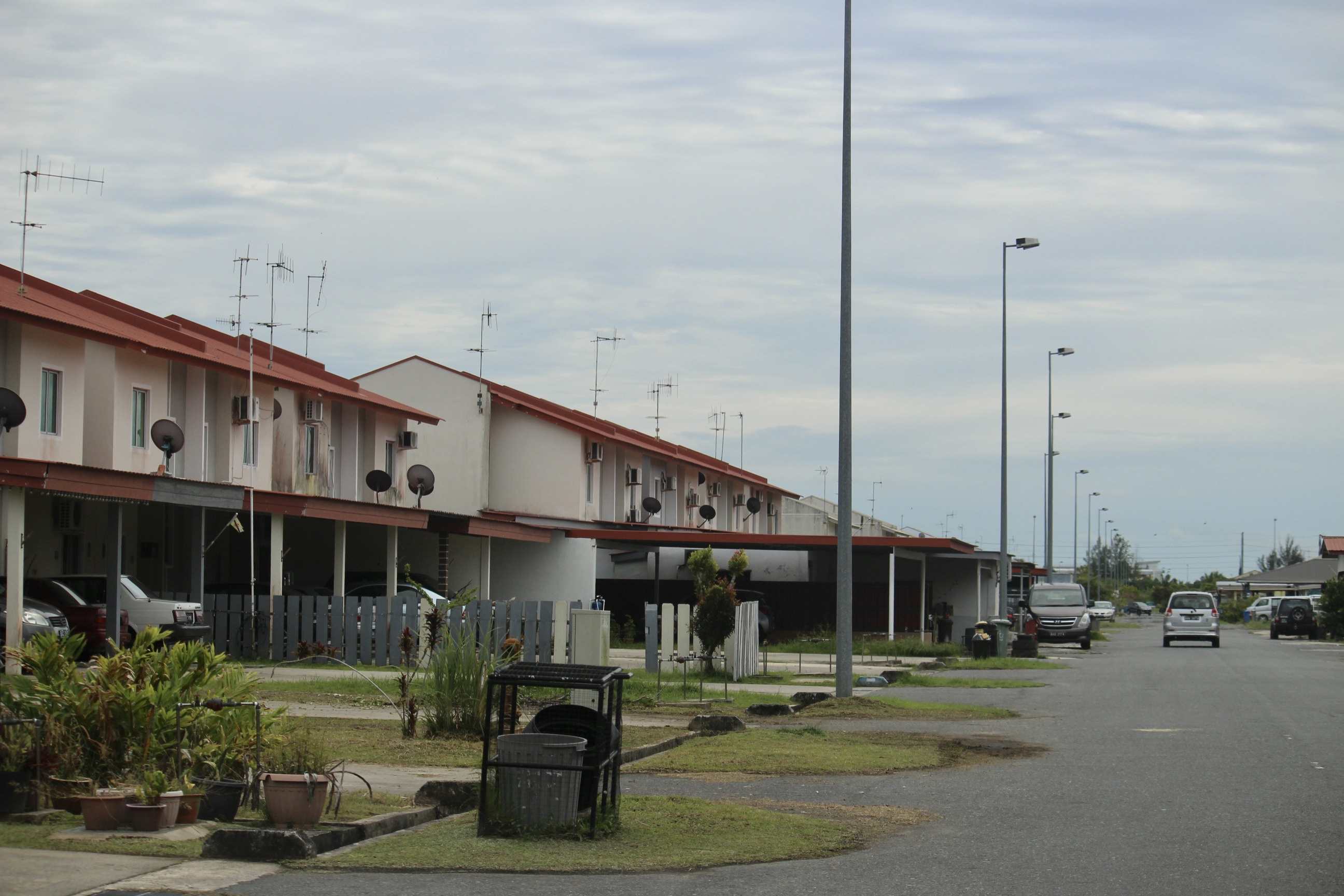
National Resettlement Scheme (RPN) Kampong Panaga

The National Housing Programme started in the 1950s with resettlement initiatives began a number of programs, such as the Infill Scheme (IS), Temporary Occupation-of-Land License (TOL), and Landless Indigenous Citizens' Housing Scheme (STKRJ). Similar housing projects have been carried out in the district at Kampong Pandan, Kampong Sungai Liang/Lumut, and Kampong Lorong Tengah Seria. The RKN 2007–2012 calls for further infrastructure development for Mumong.

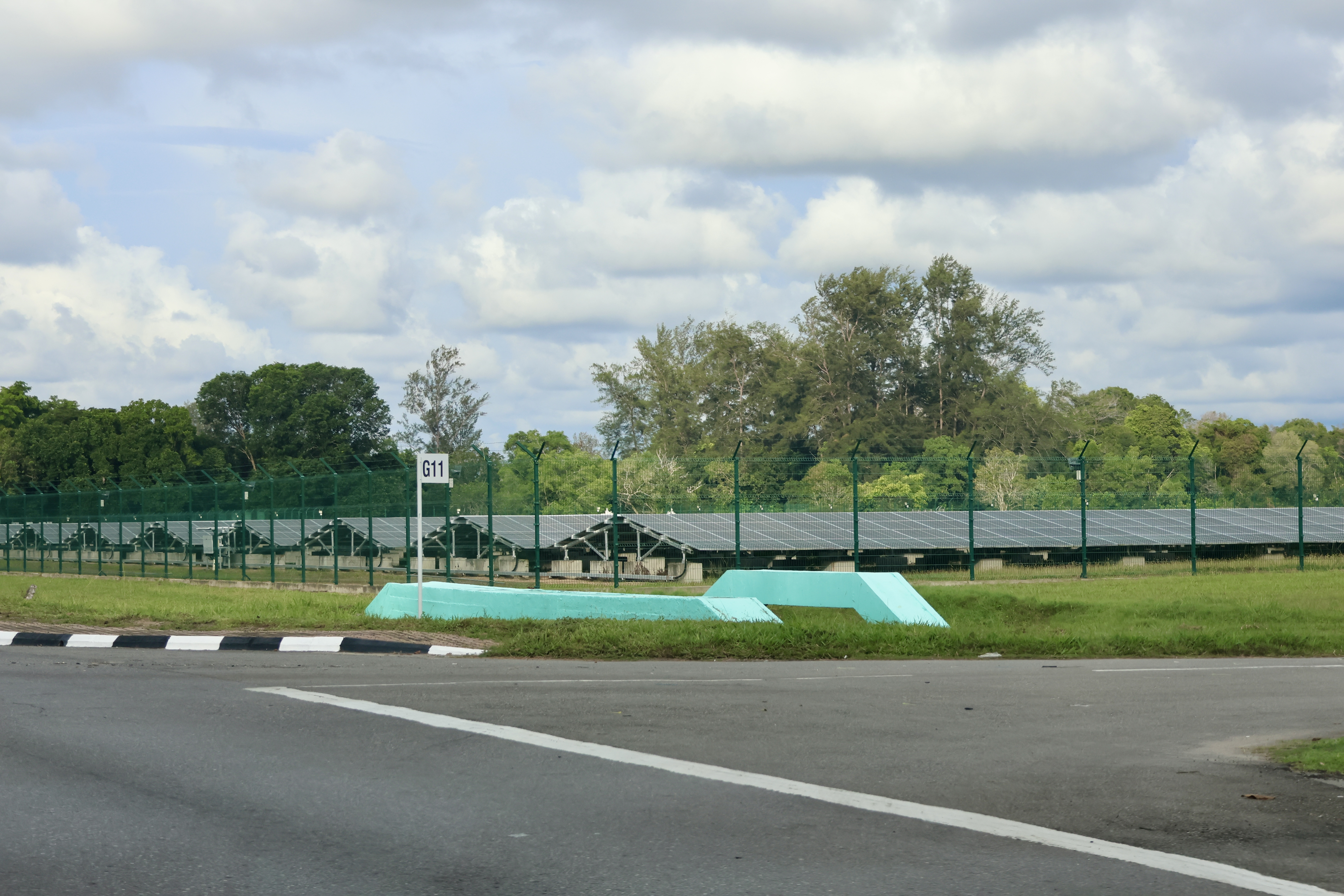
BSP Flagship Solar Plant

Using one of three separate networks, the Department of Electrical Services is in charge of managing the production, distribution, and transmission of electricity in Brunei. Brunei–Muara, Tutong, and Belait Districts are covered by network one. In response to the increasing need for power, the government built the Seria power station and, in 1987, developed a cogeneration plant in Lumut in collaboration with BSP. New street lights were installed, the power supply for SPARK was improved, and existing power stations were revitalised. The RKN 2007–2012 calls for more infrastructure development in the district as well as modifications to the distribution network.

The nation has been increasing its piped water supply since the 1970s, and in the 1980s, a Master Plan was implemented to address the growing needs resulting from development and population expansion. 99.9% of people have access to potable water by the end of the RKN 8. Water from Sungai Badas is delivered to Belait and treated at the Labi and Seria water treatment plants. Enhancing treatment capacity, decreasing unaccounted water, raising water resources, and raising quality are the main objectives of the RKN 2007–2012. Important initiatives include building a new water treatment facility in Sungai Liang, building dams in Ulu Tutong and Kargo, and modernising the current infrastructure to accommodate the increasing demand.

The Suri Seri Begawan Hospital in Belait District was founded in 1972 and is currently the second biggest hospital in the country with 183 beds and cutting-edge medical services. It offers specialised services in internal medicine, paediatrics, surgery, and other fields. In addition, Kuala Belait, Seria, Sungai Liang, and Labi have three health centers, several clinics, as well as flying and mobile clinics serving outlying communities. With five secondary and sixteen elementary public schools, two vocational schools, and a variety of private schools and centers for varied learning requirements, Belait has embraced the SPN21 educational system.

== Tourism ==
=== Commerce ===
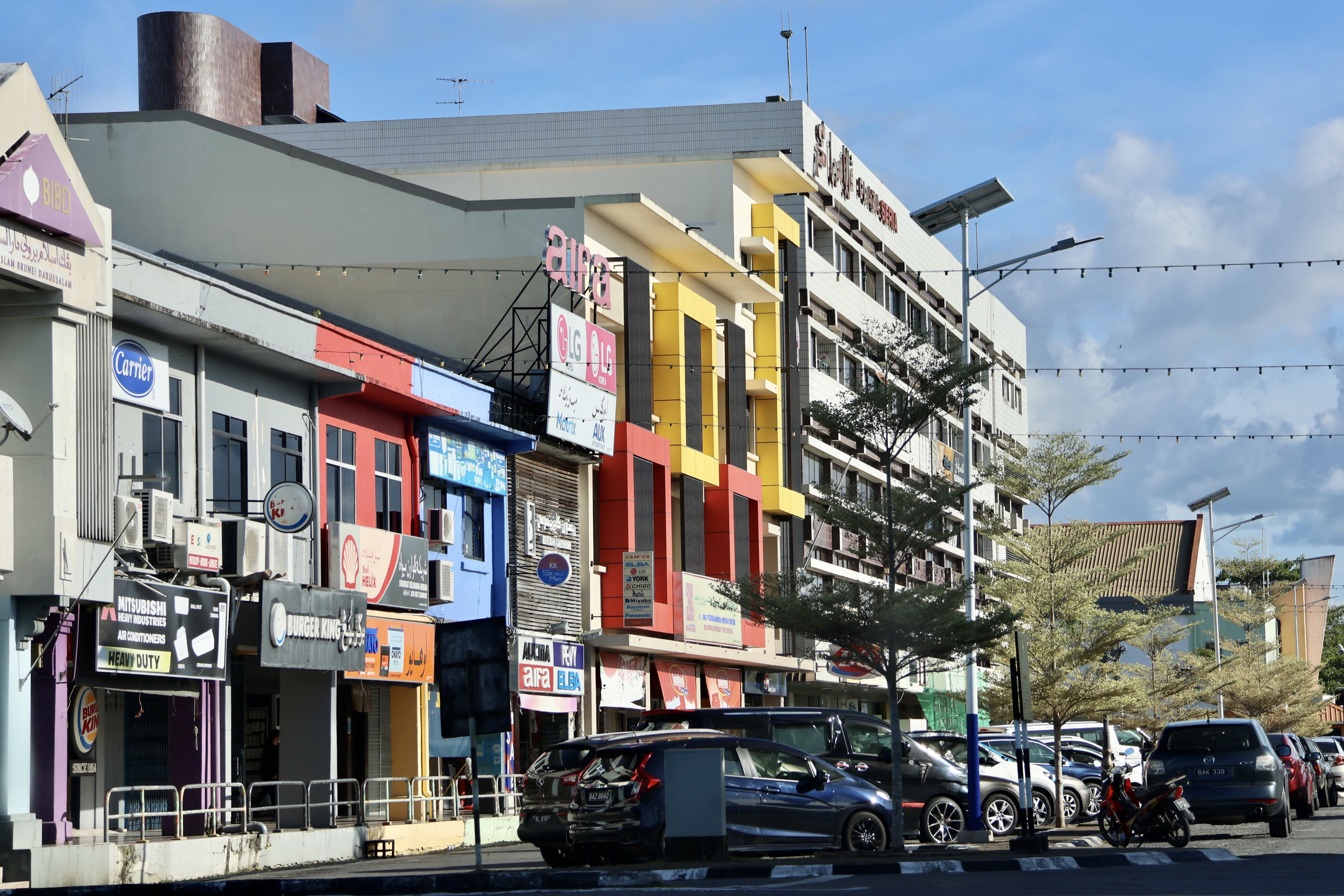
Shophouses in Seria town

A row of retail stores located on Jalan Pretty, Kuala Belait; near Pandan 5, and in Seria town, offering a range of products from clothing and handicrafts to everyday essentials. Stores are usually 5–10 minutes drive from SFA estates. Fresh fruits and vegetables are available at local tamu (market), which also offer a chance to interact with the local way of life. The Pasarneka indoor market in Kuala Belait is open every day and offers fresh fish, flowers, and other items. Weekly markets are conducted in Seria on Thursday nights and Friday mornings.

The cuisine of Brunei is varied and includes Indian, Bangladeshi, Malay, Mexican, Thai, Japanese, and Chinese dishes. In Kuala Belait and Seria, there are a few well-known western eateries. The NAAFI operates the restaurant, which is exclusively available to authorised employees and their families. The eatery offers pizzas and Asian fare.

=== Landmarks ===
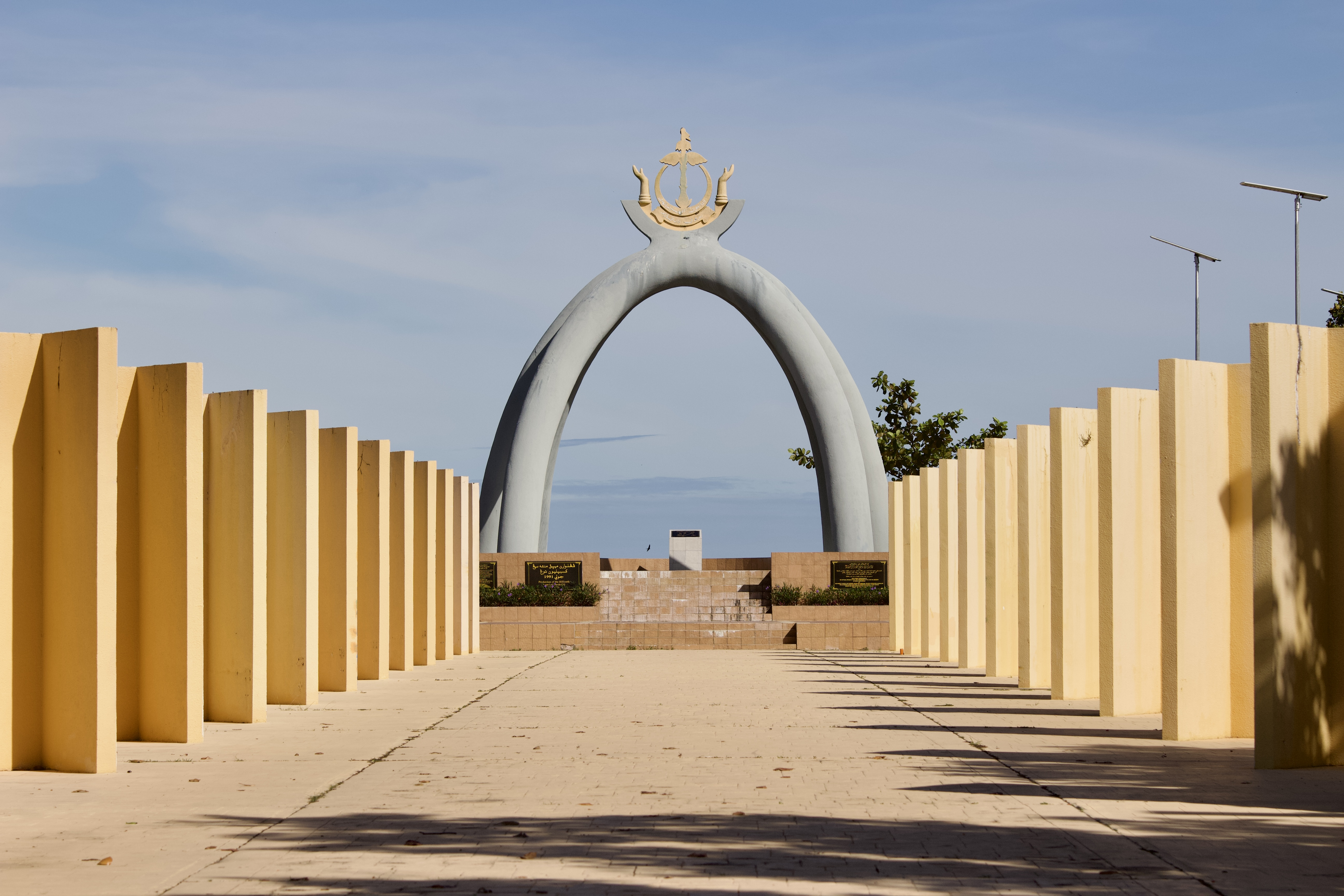
Billionth Barrel Monument

There are a number of noteworthy sites of interest in the district. BSP commissioned the Billionth Barrel Monument to commemorate the production of its billionth barrel of oil in the Seria oil field. BSP also founded the Seria Energy Lab in 2002 with the goal of educating the general population about science, technology, and the environment. Nodding donkey oil wells are another feature of the region, especially in the oil town of Seria. Sultan Hassanal Bolkiah inaugurated Anduki Jubilee Recreational Park in 1992. It has a 3.8 km running track, a lagoon, and some modest public amenities. Huts and shelters are available for recreational use at Lumut Beach. Opened in 1989, the Sungai Liang Forest Reserve has a tiny lake, a swimming pool, and a number of recreational amenities. Several places of interest in Kuala Belait consisted of the Belait District Museum and the Belait Beach. Finally, the 12,679 hectares Silver Jubilee Park honours the Silver Jubilee of Hassanal Bolkiah and is situated at Jalan Maulana with a view of the South China Sea.

Other noteworthy locations include one of Labi's highest peaks, Bukit Teraja, provides views of Mount Mulu and the Baram Valley. Situated 45 minutes away from Kuala Belait, Kuala Balai offers an insight into the traditional sago producing process and is ingrained in the local culture. A spot for jungle trekking, Wasai Wong Kadir has a charming waterfall that's perfect for picnics. About 25 kilometres from Sungai Liang, Luagan Lalak Forest Recreation Park covers 270 hectares in the Labi Hills Forest Reserve and has an alluvial freshwater swamp with wooden walkways, trails, and shelters. Fresh vegetables and household necessities may be purchased from the daily food stalls run by Kuala Belait's Gerai Tudung Saji. In addition, the district is home to traditional longhouses that represent the Iban people way of life, such as Bang Taong, Rampayoh, Mendaram Besar, Mendaram Kecil, and Teraja.
