= Takiding =

Traditional basket-backpack

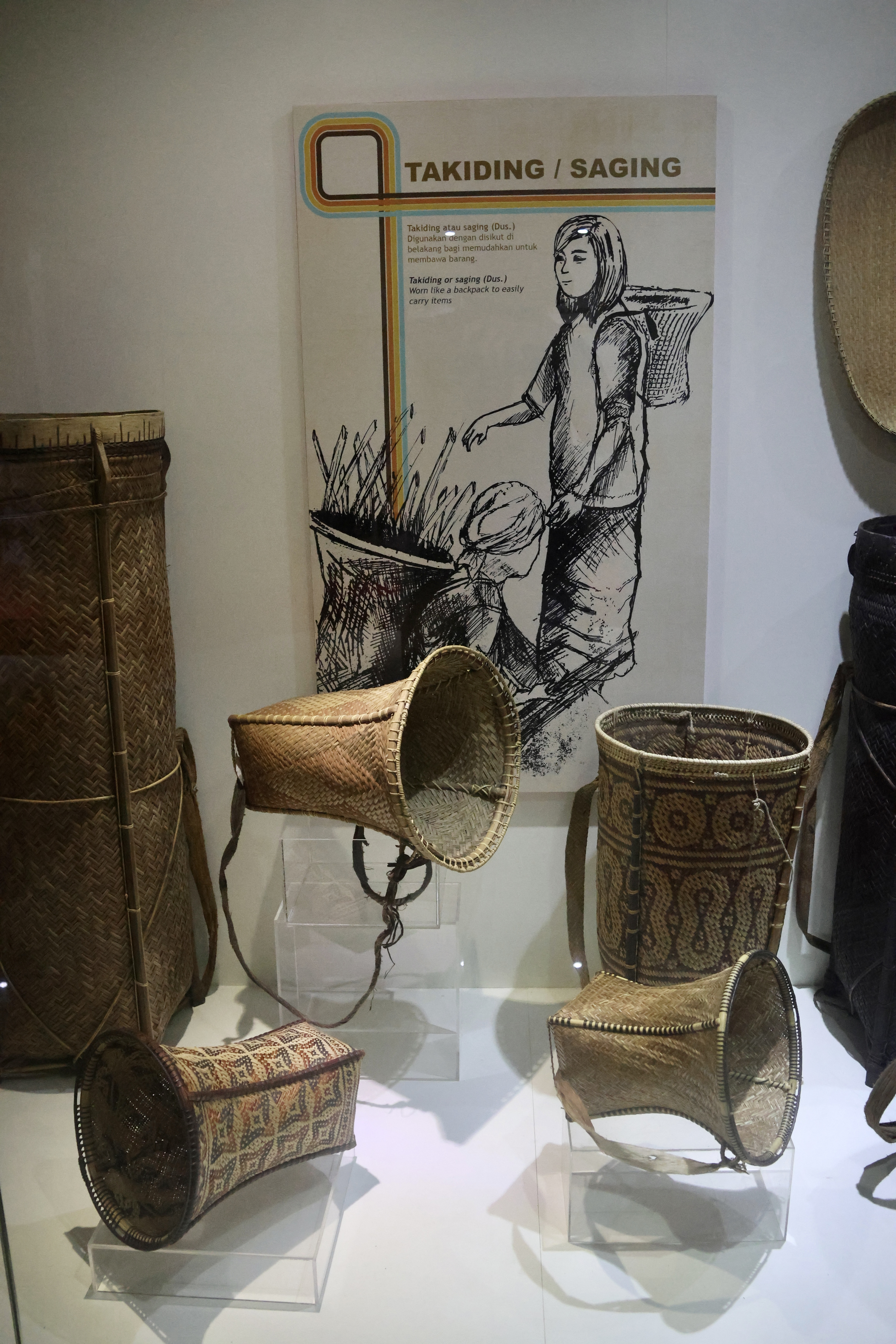
Takiding on display at the Belait District Museum, Brunei

Takiding is a traditional woven basket with shoulder straps associated with the Dusun (Brunei Dusun), Murut, Lundayeh, Bisaya Brunei, and Kedayan people in Brunei. It is made with bamboo, rattan and tree leaves and traditionally woven by hand.

== Names ==
The local spelling variants include takiding, tekiding or tikiding. It is denoted as a Murut word by the Malaysian language authority Dewan Bahasa dan Pustaka.

It is not to be confused with the same name as known in upper Padas River in Sabah, whereby the latter is another name of barait, a traditional basket-backpack of the Murut people.

== Design ==
Takiding is cylindrical with a square base and four columns to keep it upright. The top has a thick, circular rim and is lidless. The diameter in the middle may be narrower than those at the base and the top. There are two shoulder straps which are fastened to the base and the columns or the rim; smaller takiding may not have shoulder straps.

Takiding resembles boyong or sesaging, regarded as the typical traditional Murut basket-backpack.

== Creation ==
Takiding is made with materials obtained from the forest, which include bamboo, bamban (Donax canniformis), rattan and tree leaves. Either bamban or bamboo is used to make the 'body', whereas rattan and tree leaves are used to make the frames.

Depending on the size, it takes three to five days to make a takiding. It is traditionally woven by hand and may involve additional physical support from other people, which usually comprise other family members or neighbours. The weaving knowledge is passed down from the parents and grandparents, although this has become less common. Nevertheless, the Brunei Arts and Handicraft Centre has since provided courses on weaving takiding and other traditional handicrafts.

== Uses ==
Takiding was traditionally used to carry goods while visiting homes, going to the tamu (local traditional market) and to the paddy field. It is also used to carry and store harvested paddy (unmilled rice). Today, takiding is no longer used to carry goods as it has been replaced with modern backpacks. Instead, it has become a home decoration, in particular displayed in the living room.
