= Brunei Pan-Borneo Highway =

Road network in Brunei

Brunei Pan-Borneo Highway Malay: Lebuhraya Pan-Borneo Brunei

Route information
- Part of AH150
- Length: 168 km (104 mi)

Major junctions
- West end: FT 1 Malaysia Federal Route 1 (Sarawak) in Sungai Tujoh
- East end: FT 1 Malaysia Federal Route 1 (Sarawak) in Mengkalap

Section 1
- West end: FT 1 Malaysia Federal Route 1 (Sarawak) in Sungai Tujoh
- Major intersections: Jalan Labi; Jalan Utama Berakas; Tungku Highway
- East end: Tedungan

Section 2
- West end: Puni
- East end: FT 1 Malaysia Federal Route 1 (Sarawak) in Mengkalap

Location
- Country: Brunei
- Major cities: Kuala Belait; Seria; Lumut; Telisai; Pekan Tutong; Muara, Brunei; Bandar Seri Begawan; Labu

Highway system
- Brunei National Roads System

The Brunei Pan-Borneo Highway is a network of national roads in Brunei that forms the Bruneian section of the larger Pan-Borneo Highway network, with the total length of 168 kilometres (104 mi). Due to its geography, the Brunei Pan-Borneo Highway is divided into two sections that are sandwiched between the three sections of Malaysian Pan-Borneo Highway in Sarawak.

== List of interchanges, intersections and towns ==
=== Jalan Rasau Bypass ===
District	Mukim	Location	KM	Intersection	Destinations	Remarks
Malaysia - Brunei border
Sungai Tujoh Checkpoint; Customs Customs
Belait	Kuala Belait	Sungai Teraban		Sungai Teraban Intersection (2)	Northeast: Jalan Kuala Baram-Kuala Belait; Sungai Teraban; Sungai Teraban Mosque; Kuala Belait Ferry Port	T-junction
Belait	Kuala Belait	Sungai Teraban		Sungai Teraban Intersection (1)	Northeast: Rasau Power Station; Sungai Teraban; Sungai Teraban Mosque; Kuala Belait Ferry Port	T-junction
Belait	Kuala Belait	Rasau			Northwest: Jalan Sungai Teraban-Rasau; Rasau Power Station; Sungai Teraban	T-junction
Belait	Kuala Belait	Rasau	Sungai Belait Bridge			

=== Jalan Seria Bypass ===
District	Mukim	Location	KM	Intersection	Destinations	Remarks
Belait	Kuala Belait	Kuala Belait		Kuala Belait Intersection	Northwest: Jalan Pandan Lima; Kuala Belait town centre Kuala Belait Ferry Port; Silver Jubilee Park Southwest: AH150 Jalan Rasau Bypass; Sungai Teraban; Sungai Tujoh	T-junction
Belait	Kuala Belait	Kuala Belait		Kuala Balai Intersection	Southeast: Jalan Mumong-Kuala Balai; Kuala Balai	T-junction
Belait	Kuala Belait	Kuala Belait		Mumong Intersection	North: Jalan Maulana; Mumong; Pandan	T-junction
Belait	Seria	Seria		Seria Intersection	Northwest: Jalan Lorong Tiga Barat; Seria town centre Oil and Gas Discovery Centre	T-junction
Belait	Seria	Anduki		Anduki Intersection	Northeast: Jalan Seria Bypass; Kampung Anduki; Anduki Lake East: AH150 Jalan Lumut Bypass; Lumut; Sungai Liang; Labi; Telisai; Tutong; Jerudong; Bandar Seri Begawan; Muara	T-junction

=== Jalan Lumut Bypass ===
District	Mukim	Location	KM	Intersection	Destinations	Remarks
Belait	Seria	Anduki		Anduki Intersection	Northeast: Jalan Seria Bypass; Kampung Anduki; Anduki Lake West: AH150 Jalan Seria Bypass; Seria; Mumong; Kuala Belait; Sungai Tujoh	T-junction
Belait	Seria	Anduki		Badas Intersection	Southeast: Kampung Badas; Badas Water Pumping Station	Westbound only T-junction
Belait	Sungai Liang	Lumut		Lumut Intersection	Northwest: Lumut	T-junction
Belait	Sungai Liang	Lumut			Northwest: Lumut Housing Estate	Eastbound only T-junction
Belait	Sungai Liang	Sungai Liang			Northwest: Jalan Seria Bypass; Lumut	Eastbound only T-junction
Belait	Sungai Liang	Sungai Liang		SPARK Intersection	Northwest: Simpang 787; Sungai Liang Industrial Park Northeast: AH150 Jalan Tutong-Seria; Sungai Liang; Labi; Telisai; Tutong; Jerudong; Bandar Seri Begawan; Muara	3-way signalised intersection

=== Jalan Tutong–Seria ===
District	Mukim	Location	KM	Intersection	Destinations	Remarks
Belait	Sungai Liang	Sungai Liang		SPARK Intersection	Northwest: Simpang 787; Sungai Liang Industrial Park Southwest: AH150 Jalan Lumut Bypass; Lumut; Badas; Seria; Mumong; Kuala Belait	3-way signalised intersection
Belait	Sungai Liang	Sungai Liang		Labi Intersection	South: Jalan Labi; Bukit Sawat; Bukit Puan; Bisut; Labi; Brunei Forestry Centre; Rampayoh; Sukang; Melilas; Bukit Teraja	T-junction
Tutong	Telisai	Keramut		Keramut Intersection	Northeast: Keramut; Penyatang; Danau	T-junction
Tutong	Telisai	Telisai		Telisai Intersection	South: Telisai Earth Satellite Station Northeast: AH150 Jalan Tutong Bypass; Tutong; Jerudong; Bandar Seri Begawan; Muara	Westbound only T-junction

=== Jalan Tutong Bypass ===
District	Mukim	Location	KM	Intersection	Destinations	Remarks
Tutong	Telisai	Telisai		Telisai Intersection	South: Telisai Earth Satttelite Station Southwest: AH150 Jalan Tutong-Seria; Keramut; Sungai Liang; Labi; Lumut; Seria; Kuala Belait	Westbound only T-junction
Tutong	Telisai	Bukit Beruang		Bukit Beruang Intersection (2)	Southeast: Simpang 1185; Bukit Beruang	Westbound only T-junction
Tutong	Telisai	Bukit Beruang		Bukit Beruang Intersection (1)	South: Bukit Beruang	Westbound only T-junction
Tutong	Tanjong Maya	Tanjong Maya		Tanjong Maya Intersection	South: Tanjong Maya; Bangunggos; Sibakit	Westbound only T-junction
Tutong	Tanjong Maya	Lubok Pulau		Lubok Pulau Intersection	Southeast: Lubok Pulau; Bukit Udal; Layong; Lamunin; Sungai Beruang; Kiudang; Ukong; Pangkalan Mau; Bang Pangan; Tasek Merimbun; Long Tadion; Rambai; Benutan Dam	Westbound only T-junction
Tutong	Pekan Tutong	Tutong		Sengkarai Intersection	Northwest: Jalan Kuala Tutong; Seri Kenangan Beach; Penabai; Kuala Tutong East: Jalan Sengkarai; Tutong; Pengiran Muda Mahkota Pengiran Muda Haji Al-Muhtadee Billah Hospital; Tutong Post Office; Sungai Basong Recreational Park; Penanjong; Bukit Panggal; Jerudong; Bandar Seri Begawan North: AH150 Muara-Tutong Highway; Sungai Basong Recreational Park; Penanjong; Bukit Panggal; Jerudong; Bandar Seri Begawan; Muara	4-way signalised intersection

=== Muara–Tutong Highway ===
District	Mukim	Location	KM	Intersection	Destinations	Remarks
Tutong	Pekan Tutong	Tutong	58.1	Sengkarai Intersection	Northwest: Jalan Kuala Tutong; Seri Kenangan Beach; Penabai; Kuala Tutong East: Jalan Sengkarai; Tutong; Pengiran Muda Mahkota Pengiran Muda Haji Al-Muhtadee Billah Hospital; Tutong Post Office North: AH150 Jalan Tutong Bypass; Lubok Pulau; Tanjong Maya; Telisai; Sungai Liang; Lumut; Seria; Kuala Belait	4-way signalised intersection
Tutong	Pekan Tutong	Tutong	56.7		Southeast: Tutong; Petani; Suran	Southwest-bound only T-junction
Tutong	Pekan Tutong	Tutong	55.3		Northwest: Simpang 181; Tutong Water Treatment Plant	Northeast-bound only T-junction
Tutong	Pekan Tutong	Tutong	55.3		Southeast: Jalan Sungai Besar; Pengiran Muda Mahkota Pengiran Muda Haji Al-Muhtadee Billah Hospital; Tutong	Southwest-bound only T-junction
Tutong	Pekan Tutong	Tutong	54.6	Panchor Papan Intersection	Northeast: Tutong Camp Southwest: Jalan Sungai Basong; Sungai Basong Recreational Park; Pengiran Muda Mahkota Pengiran Muda Haji Al-Muhtadee Billah Hospital; Tutong; Lamunin; Bandar Seri Begawan (via Jalan Tutong)	4-way signalised intersection
Tutong	Pekan Tutong	Tutong	53.2	Penanjong South Interchange	Jalan Tutong East: Lamunin; Jerudong; Sengkurong; Kuala Lurah; Tanjong Bunut; Bandar Seri Begawan Southwest: Tutong; Kuala Tutong North: Jalan Penanjong; Penanjong; Penanjong Camp	5-way hybrid interchange
Tutong	Keriam	Bukit Panggal	48.5	Penanjong East Intersection	North: Penanjong Camp	T-junction
Tutong	Keriam	Bukit Panggal	47.5	Bukit Panggal Intersection	North: Jalan Bukit Panggal; Penanjong Camp	Eastbound only T-junction
Tutong	Keriam	Bukit Panggal	47.5	Bukit Panggal Intersection	South: Jalan Bukit Panggal; Bukit Panggal; Jalan Tutong	Westbound only T-junction
Tutong	Keriam	Bukit Panggal	45.8	Bukit Panggal East Intersection	South: Bukit Panggal Power Station	Westbound only T-junction
Brunei-Muara	Sengkurong	Jerudong	28.7	Jerudong Park Interchange	Jerudong Park North: Jerudong Park Medical Centre South: Jerudong Fire Station	Parclo Interchange
Brunei-Muara	Sengkurong	Jerudong	27.2	Jerudong Interchange	North: Jalan Jerudong; Jerudong Beach; Jerudong Market South: AH150 Jalan Jerudong; Jerudong; Sengkurong; Tanjong Nangka; Kilanas; Kuala Lurah; Tanjong Bunut; Gadong; Bengkurong; Bunut East: Muara–Tutong Highway; The Empire Hotel & Country Club; Tungku Beach; Berakas Recreational Park; Gadong; Raja Isteri Pengiran Anak Saleha Hospital; Rimba Housing Estate; Lambak Kanan; Brunei International Airport; Bandar Seri Begawan; Berakas; Meragang Beach; Muara	Parclo interchange

=== Jalan Jerudong ===
District	Mukim	Location	KM	Intersection	Destinations	Remarks
Brunei-Muara	Sengkurong	Jerudong		Jerudong Interchange	North: Jalan Jerudong; Jerudong Beach; Jerudong Market West: AH150 Muara–Tutong Highway; Jerudong Park; Tutong; Telisai; Sungai Liang; Lumut; Seria; Kuala Belait East: Muara–Tutong Highway; The Empire Hotel & Country Club; Tungku Beach; Berakas Recreational Park; Gadong; Raja Isteri Pengiran Anak Saleha Hospital; Rimba Housing Estate; Lambak Kanan; Brunei International Airport; Bandar Seri Begawan; Berakas; Meragang Beach; Muara	Parclo interchange
Brunei-Muara	Sengkurong	Jerudong		Pulau Kubu Intersection	West: Simpang 591; Jerudong Park; Jerudong Park Medical Centre East: Simpang 544 (also known as Jalan Pulau Kubu)	4-way signalised intersection
Brunei-Muara	Sengkurong	Jerudong		Selayun Jerudong Intersection	West: Simpang 401 East: Simpang 396; Jalan Selayun Jerudong	4-way signalised intersection
Brunei-Muara	Sengkurong	Sengkurong		Jerudong Intersection	Southwest: Jalan Tutong; Kupang; Sinaut; Keriam; Tutong; Pangkalan Mau; Kiudang; Sungai Beruang; Lamunin; Bukit Sulang Northeast: AH150 Jalan Tutong Tanjung Bunut; Kilanas; Jangsak; Gadong; Bunut; Madewa; Telanai; Beribi; Kiulap; Raja Isteri Pengiran Anak Saleha Hospital; Brunei International Airport; Bandar Seri Begawan; Kota Batu	3-way signalised intersection

=== Jalan Tutong ===
District	Mukim	Location	KM	Intersection	Destinations	Remarks
Brunei-Muara	Sengkurong	Sengkurong		Jerudong Intersection	Southwest: Jalan Tutong; Kupang; Sinaut; Keriam; Tutong; Pangkalan Mau; Kiudang; Sungai Beruang; Lamunin; Bukit Sulang; Seria; Kuala Belait North: AH150 Jalan Jerudong; Jerudong; Jerudong Park; Jerudong Park Medical Centre AH150 Muara–Tutong Highway; Tutong; Seria; Kuala Belait	3-way signalised intersection
Brunei-Muara	Sengkurong	Sengkurong		Mulaut Intersection	South: AH150 Jalan Mulaut-Limau Manis; Kilanas; Mulaut; Bebatik; Masin; Burong Lepas; Parit; Pengkalan Batu; Batu Ampar; Batang Perhentian; Kuala Lurah; Jujongan; Lumapas; Sungai Kebun; Kilugus; Kasat Northeast: Jalan Tutong; Tanjong Bunut; Kilanas; Jangsak; Gadong; Bunut; Madewa; Telanai; Beribi; Kiulap; Raja Isteri Pengiran Anak Saleha Hospital; Brunei International Airport; Bandar Seri Begawan; Kota Batu	3-way signalised intersection

=== Jalan Mulaut–Limau Manis ===
District	Mukim	Location	KM	Intersection	Destinations	Remarks	
Brunei-Muara	Sengkurong	Sengkurong		Mulaut Intersection	Southwest: AH150 Jalan Tutong; Kupang; Sinaut; Keriam; Tutong; Pangkalan Mau; Kiudang; Sungai Beruang; Lamunin; Bukit Sulang; Seria; Kuala Belait AH150 Jalan Jerudong; Jerudong; Jerudong Park; Jerudong Park Medical Centre Northeast: Jalan Tutong; Tanjung Bunut; Kilanas; Jangsak; Gadong; Bunut; Madewa; Telanai; Beribi; Kiulap; Raja Isteri Pengiran Anak Saleha Hospital; Brunei International Airport; Bandar Seri Begawan; Kota Batu	3-way signalised intersection	
Brunei-Muara	Mukim Pengkalan Batu	Bebatik		Bebatik Kilanas Intersection	Northeast: Jalan Bebatik Kilanas; Kilanas; Tanjong Bunut; Gadong; Bandar Seri Begawan	T-junction	
Brunei-Muara	Mukim Pengkalan Batu	Bebatik			Kulapis Bebatik Intersection	West: Jalan Kulapis Bebatik; Kampung Kulapis; Tutong	T-junction
Brunei-Muara	Mukim Pengkalan Batu	Batu Ampar		Batu Ampar Roundabout	West: Belimbing; Wasan; Bebuluh; Imang; Panchor Murai; Kulapis; Tutong	3-way roundabout	
Brunei-Muara	Mukim Pengkalan Batu	Batang Perhentian		Batang Perhentian Roundabout	Northwest: Jalan Sekolah; Limau Manis East: Jalan Junjongan; Junjongan; Burong Lepas Bengkurong; Lumapas; Sungai Kebun; Kilugus; Kasat; Bunut; Kilanas; Gadong; Telanai; Brunei International Airport; Bandar Seri Begawan; Kota Batu; Muara Southwest: AH150 Jalan Kuala Lurah; Kuala Lurah	4-way roundabout	

=== Jalan Bangar–Puni–Ujong Jalan ===
District	Mukim	Location	KM	Intersection	Destinations	Remarks
Temburong	Bangar	Ujong Jalan		Limbang-Bangar Ferry Service		
Malaysia - Brunei border
Puni Checkpoint; No Dive-Thru Border Checkpoint; Please stop at checkpoint before continuing on the route Customs
No data available. Please contribute.

=== Jalan Labu ===
District	Mukim	Location	KM	Intersection	Destinations	Remarks
Labu Checkpoint; Customs Customs
Brunei - Malaysia border
