= List of mosques in Brunei =

This is a list of mosques in Brunei.

== List of mosques ==
=== Brunei–Muara District ===
Name	Image	Location	Year (CE)	Remarks
Omar Ali Saifuddien Mosque		Pusat Bandar	1958	
Setia Ali Mosque		Kampong Serasa	1962	
Kampong Kilanas Mosque		Kampong Kilanas	1968	
Kampong Pudak Mosque		Kampong Pudak	1974	
Kampong Tanah Jambu Mosque		Kampong Tanah Jambu	1979	
Mohamed Bolkiah Mosque		Kampong Serusop	1979	
Kampong Kasat Mosque		Kampong Kasat	1980	
Kampong Menunggol Mosque		Kampong Menunggol	1980	
Pehin Datu Imam Haji Abdul Mokti Mosque		Kampong Burong Pingai Ayer	1981	
Kampong Sungai Hanching Mosque		Kampong Sungai Hanching	1982	
Kampong Panchor Murai Mosque		Kampong Panchor Murai	1983	
Kampong Beribi Mosque		Kampong Beribi	1984	
Kampong Mentiri Mosque		Kampong Mentiri	1984	
Kampong Sungai Besar Mosque		Kampong Sungai Besar	1984	
Sultan Sharif Ali Mosque		Kampong Sengkurong	1986	
Al-Muhtadee Billah Mosque		Kampong Sungai Kebun	1987	
Kampong Pulaie Mosque		Kampong Pulaie	1987	
Kampong Masin Mosque		Kampong Masin	1987	
Kampong Bengkurong Mosque		Kampong Bengkurong	1991	
Kampong Bunut Mosque		Kampong Bunut	1992	
Jame' Asr Hassanil Bolkiah Mosque		Kampong Kiarong	1994	
Kampong Lambak Mosque		Kampong Lambak	1994	
Kampong Limau Manis Mosque		Kampong Limau Manis	1994	
Kampong Lumapas Mosque		Kampong Lumapas	1995	
Universiti Brunei Darussalam Mosque		Kampong Rimba	1995	
Kampong Salambigar Mosque		Kampong Salambigar	1995	
Kampong Belimbing Mosque		Kampong Belimbing	1995	
Perdana Wangsa Haji Mohammad Mosque		Kampong Setia 'A'	1995	
Perpindahan Lambak Kanan Mosque		Lambak Kanan	1996	
Sufri Bolkiah Mosque		Kampong Jaya Setia	1996	
Jubli Perak Sultan Haji Hassanal Bolkiah Mosque		Kampong Jangsak	1996	
Kampong Serdang Mosque		Kampong Serdang	1996	
Kampong Kapok Mosque		Kampong Kapok	1996	
Kampong Batu Marang Mosque		Kampong Batu Marang	1996	
Kampong Pintu Malim Mosque		Kampong Pintu Malim	1997	
Kampong Junjungan Mosque		Kampong Junjungan	1998	
Al-Ameerah Al-Hajjah Maryam Mosque		Kampong Jerudong	1999	
Duli Pengiran Muda Mahkota Pengiran Muda Haji Al-Muhtadee Billah Mosque		Kampong Tamoi	1999	
Ash-Shaliheen Mosque		Kampong Melabau	2012	
Pengiran Muda Abdul Malik Mosque		Kampong Katok	2012	
Pengiran Muda Abdul Mateen Mosque		Kampong Mulaut	2012	
Duli Raja Isteri Pengiran Anak Damit Mosque		Kampong Kilanas	2012	
Jefri Bolkiah Mosque		Kampong Batong	2013	
Rashidah Sa'adatul Bolkiah Mosque		Kampong Sungai Akar	2013	
Suri Seri Begawan Raja Pengiran Anak Damit Mosque		Kampong Madang	2014	
Pehin Khatib Abdullah Mosque		Kampong Kulapis	2017	
Hassanal Bolkiah Mosque		Kampong Mentiri	2017	
Ar-Rahman Mosque		Kampong Tanjong Bunut	2018	
Az-Zakireen Meragang Mosque		Kampong Meragang	2024	
Kampong Sungai Bunga Mosque		Kampong Sungai Bunga		
Raja Isteri Pengiran Anak Hajah Saleha Mosque		Kampong Rimba		

=== Belait District ===
Name	Image	Location	Year (CE)	Remarks
Pekan Seria Mosque		Pekan Seria	1954	
Mohammad Jamalul Alam Mosque		Pekan Kuala Belait	1963	
Kampong Labi Mosque		Kampong Labi	1979	
Kampong Sungai Liang Mosque		Kampong Sungai Liang	1980	
Kampong Bukit Sawat Mosque		Kampong Bukit Sawat	1990	
Al-Mashor Mosque		Kampong Sungai Mau	1992	
Kampong Sungai Teraban Mosque		Kampong Sungai Teraban	1994	
Kampong Pandan Mosque		Kampong Pandan	1996	
Zainab Mosque		Kampong Lumut	1998	
Skim Tanah Kurnia Rakyat Jati Lorong Tiga Selatan Mosque		Kampong Lorong Tiga Selatan		

=== Tutong District ===
Name	Image	Location	Year (CE)	Remarks
Hassanal Bolkiah Mosque		Pekan Tutong	1966	
Kampong Kiudang Mosque		Kampong Kiudang	1972	
Kampong Danau Mosque		Kampong Danau	1973	
Kampong Tanjong Maya Mosque		Kampong Tanjong Maya	1973	
Kampong Sinaut Mosque		Kampong Sinaut	1979	
Kampong Telisai Mosque		Kampong Telisai	1984	
Kampong Penanjong Mosque		Kampong Penanjong	1984	
Kampong Bang Dalam Mosque		Kampong Bang Dalam	1990	
Kampong Layong Mosque		Kampong Layong	1990	
Kampong Menengah Mosque		Kampong Menengah	1990	
Kampong Penapar Mosque		Kampong Penapar	1991	
Kampong Birau Mosque		Kampong Birau	1991	
Haji Abdul Azim Mosque		Kampong Luagan Dudok	1992	
Kampong Keriam Mosque		Kampong Keriam	1992	
Kampong Penabai Mosque		Kampong Penabai	1993	
Kampong Bukit Udal Mosque		Kampong Bukit Udal	1995	
Kampong Lubok Pulau Mosque		Kampong Lubok Pulau	1995	
Kampong Benutan Mosque		Kampong Benutan	1996	
Kampong Bukit Mosque		Kampong Bukit	1997	
Kampong Kupang Mosque		Kampong Kupang	1997	
Ar-Rahim Mosque		Kampong Bukit Panggal	2019	
Pengiran Anak Haji Mohamed Alam Mosque		Kampong Sengkarai	2017	
Kampong Perpindahan Bukit Beruang Mosque		Kampong Bukit Beruang		
Kampong Lamunin Mosque		Kampong Lamunin		
Pengiran Anak Isteri Pengiran Anak Sarah Mosque		Kampong Sungai Kelugos		
Pengiran Muda Abdul Wakeel Mosque		Kampong Kiudang		

=== Temburong District ===
Name	Image	Location	Year (CE)	Remarks
Utama Mohammed Salleh Mosque		Pekan Bangar	1968	
Kampong Selangan Mosque		Kampong Selangan	1979	
Kampong Labu Estate Mosque		Kampong Labu Estate	1982	
Kampong Puni Mosque		Kampong Puni	1982	
Kampong Batu Apoi Mosque		Kampong Batu Apoi	1987	
Pengiran Haji Abu Bakar Mosque		Kampong Bokok	1988	
Kampong Belais Mosque		Kampong Belais	1996	

== See also ==
- Islam in Brunei
- Mosques in Brunei
