= Kampong Birau =

Village in Tutong District, Brunei

Kampong Birau Kampung Birau
- Village
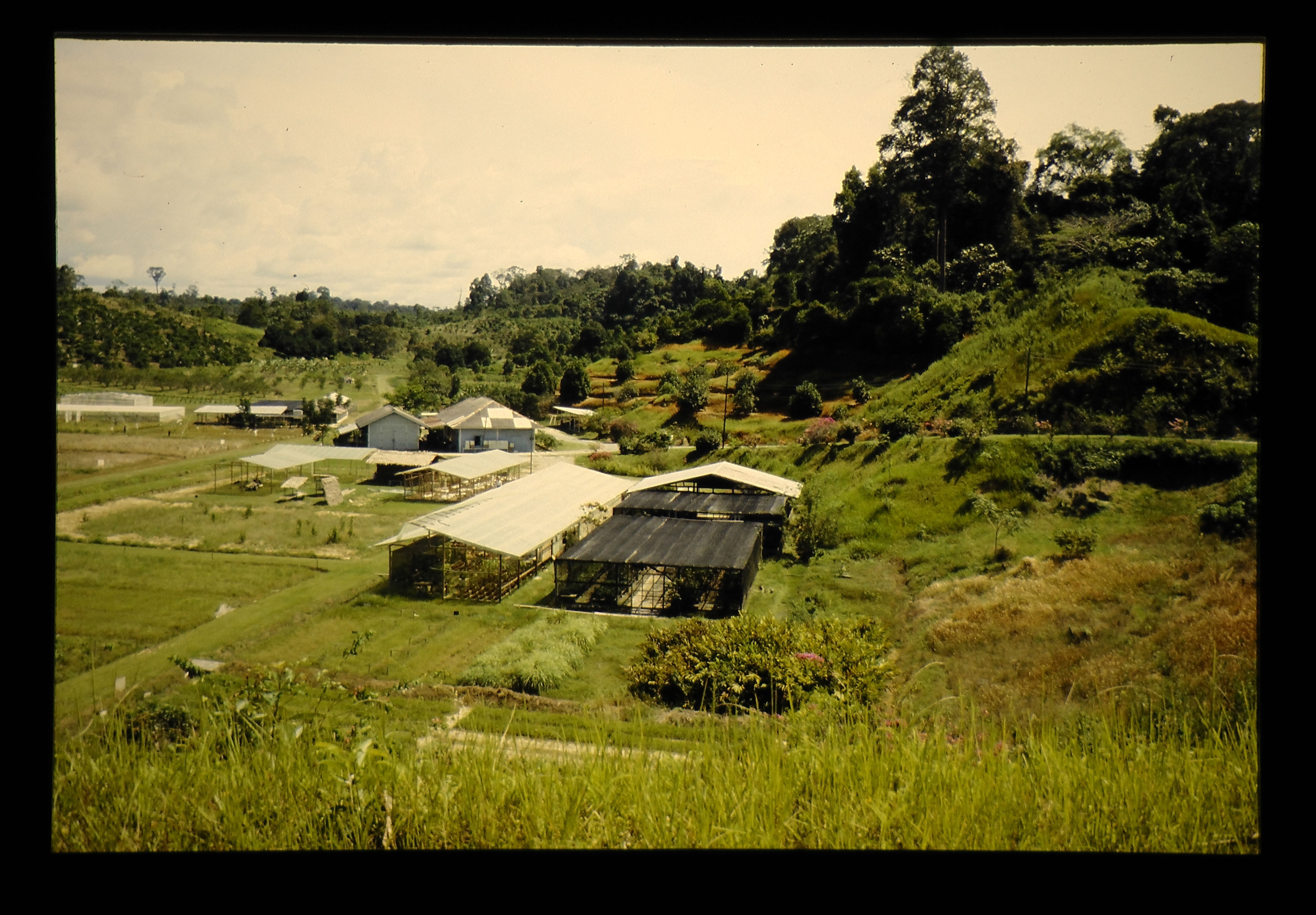
- Birau Research Station in 1989

- Location in Brunei
- Coordinates: 4°47′03″N 114°45′25″E
- Country: Brunei
- District: Tutong
- Mukim: Kiudang
- First settled: 19th century

Government
  - Village head: Masburah Suhaile

Area
  - Total: 35 km^{2} (13.5 sq mi)

Population (2021)
  - Total: 918
  - Density: 26.3/km^{2} (68.0/sq mi)
- Time zone: UTC+8 (BNT)
- Postcode: TE2143

Kampong Birau (Malay: Kampong Birau) is a village located in the Tutong District of Brunei, within the mukim of Kiudang. Covering an area of 13.5 square miles (35 km^{2}), the village had a population of 918 in 2021. Located about 26 kilometres (16 mi) from Tutong town, it is bordered by Kampong Luagan Timbaran and Kebia. The village's postcode is TE2143.

== Etymology ==
The name "Birau" is derived from a traditional game called 'bahirau,' which is similar to the 'berkuit' game that uses coconut shells. The game was played as a form of entertainment after the villagers finished their rice planting. The location where this game was played is approximately one kilometre from present-day Kampong Birau.

== History ==
Kampong Birau has long been known among the residents of Tutong River as a significant rice farming area. Kuala Birau, or Long Birau, located along the river, was one of the earliest settlements of the Tutong people, many of whom now reside in Kampong Suran, Panchor, and Petani. Kuala Birau also served as the main gateway for people living along the river to access the interior of Tutong District for rice farming and buffalo herding. Notable areas once explored by these settlers include Lagu Adau (Kuala Adau), Sambatang, and Kampong Santul.

The need for rice cultivation led the Tutong people living along the Tutong River to settle in the Kuala Birau area, about 8 kilometres from the present-day village. Early settlers included Jumat bin Kadir, Yakub, Bungsu, and Ludin, who hailed from Kampong Panchor. The ketua kampung (village head) at that time was Pengiran Osman, originally from Sarawak, who lived in a place known as Suak Ajung.

Initially, Kampong Birau was home to the Dusun people, who had various names for their settlements. Notable areas included Sambiling and Bukit Suak Nantu, while two rivers in the village were known as Bawang Putih and Bawang Amok. Sambiling was a swampy area near Bukit Mahligai (the site of the current Kampong Birau Mosque) that was developed by Orang Kaya Temenggong Umo, a Dusun leader with connections to the Dusun people of Laman Kebia (Kampong Kebia) and Batang Mitus. When the Tutong people moved to the new settlement, the area came to be known as Kampong Birau.

The migration of the Tutong people to the new settlement accelerated after the construction of the Kuala Abang road in the late 1930s, connecting Brunei Town to Kampong Lamunin. This development led to the abandonment of their original settlement in old Kampong Birau.

== Administration ==
The first ketua kampung (village head) of Kampong Birau was Burut bin Yaakub, followed by Haji Ratu bin Ismail, and later Haji Zainuddin bin Daud. The current village head governs both Kampong Birau and Luagan Timbaran.

== Infrastructure ==
=== Education ===
The village's residents built a temporary school building through a gotong-royong effort led by the village head, Haji Ratu bin Haji Ismail, on 13 August 1954, on a plot of government land. The school building measured approximately 36 by 18 feet (11.0 m × 5.5 m), had no floor, and was made with bulian wood pillars, kajang walls, and a thatched nipah roof. The school also included rooms like a school hall, a canteen, and teachers' houses, all constructed with similar materials. The school officially began its classes on 22 January 1955 and was formally opened on 15 February 1955. The first headmaster was Haji Metamit bin Iradat, assisted by Abang Taha bin Abang Muhammad. At that time, the school had more than 38 students, including 15 girls, studying in first and second grades. The students came from the Tutong, Kedayan, and Dusun communities living in Kebia, Birau, and Luagan Timbaran. Before the school was established, the villagers attended school in Kampong Kiudang.

=== Religion ===
In addition to educational development, the village residents also participated in Quranic studies and religious lessons, including the practice of prayer, taught by a teacher named Syiling bin Ahmad, known as Guru Keling, who was from Sarawak. Before settling in Kampong Birau, he had taught in Kampong Penanjong and moved to Birau with his wife, Radiah binti Simpul. Before the mosque was built, villagers would perform the Friday prayers at the Kampong Kiudang Mosque, while Ramadan Quran recitations were held in homes.

In response to these needs, a mosque was constructed in early 1962. The construction was a gotong-royong effort between the residents of Birau and Luagan Timbaran, led by the village head, Haji Ratu bin Haji Ismail, who also donated 0.25 acres (0.10 ha) of his land for the building. On 18 January 1963, permission was granted to use the mosque for Friday prayers. Haji Basir bin Taha served as the volunteer imam, assisted by Haji Marsal bin Haji Hassan, under the leadership of Haji Abdul Kadir bin Talip, a religious teacher from Malaysia. The mosque gained its first permanent imam on 20 February 1965, Imam Haji Abdul Rahman bin Haji Serudin, with Haji Sinoh bin Abdul Rahman appointed as the deputy bilal. In 1987, the second imam position was filled by Haji Abdul Kadir bin Haji Ratu.

The mosque building underwent several renovations, initiated by the Department of Religious Affairs since 1963. On 9 October 1990, a new mosque building was completed and began operation on 12 October 1990, located on a 2.25 acres (0.91 ha) government land plot near the original mosque. The new mosque, which can accommodate about 200 worshippers, was officially inaugurated by Crown Prince Al-Muhtadee Billah on 2 August 1991.
