= Kampong Tasek Meradun =

Village in Brunei

Tasek Meradun
- Village and neighbourhood
- Kampong Tasek Meradun
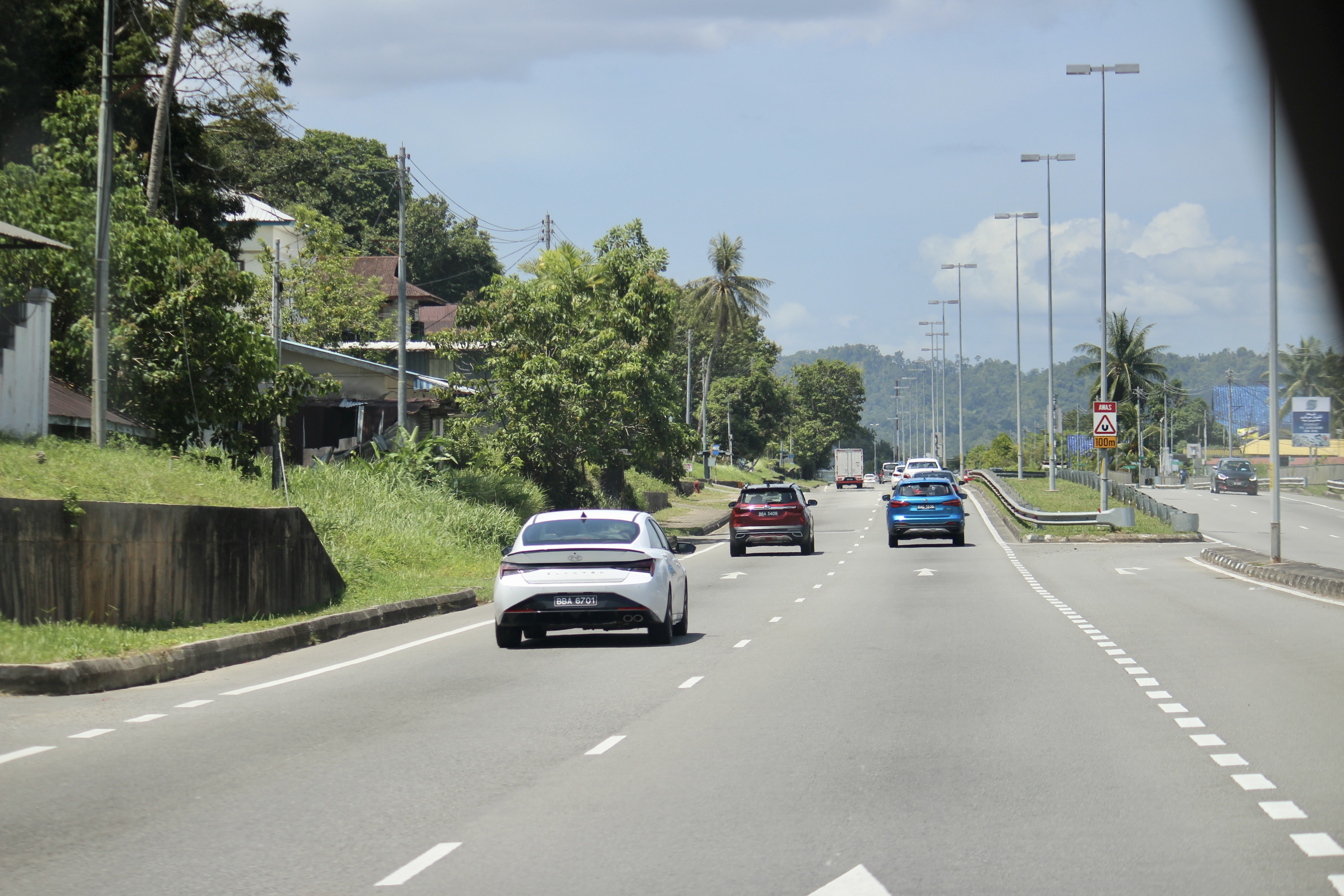
- Tasek Meradun (left) and Bunut (right)
- Motto: Bersatu Ke arah Kesejahteraan, Keamanan, Kemakmuran dan Pembangunan
- Location in Brunei
- Coordinates: 4°51′11″N 114°52′25″E
- Country: Brunei
- District: Brunei-Muara
- Mukim: Kilanas

Government
  - Village head: Hussaini Mohsin

Population (2016)
  - Total: 400
- Time zone: UTC+8 (BNT)
- Postcode: BF1520

Kampong Tasek Meradun (Malay: Kampung Tasek Meradun) or simply known as Tasek Meradun, is a village in Brunei-Muara District, Brunei, as well as a neighbourhood in the capital Bandar Seri Begawan. The population was 400 in 2016. It is one of the villages within Mukim Kilanas. The postcode is BF1520.

The motto of the village is 'Bersatu Ke arah Kesejahteraan, Keamanan, Kemakmuran dan Pembangunan' (United Towards Prosperity, Peace, Prosperity and Development).

== Etymology ==
According to folktales, the history of Kampong Tasek Meradun originated at the Tasek (Waterfall) approximately 150 meters high with a width of eight meters and this place is often and always visited by the public for picnics. In the 1950s, it was clear that the head of the village, it was a place where people bathed in order to find strength and good health. Since Hela Bangok had died, his children and descendants did not have time to take over the knowledge to take care of the waterfall.

In addition to that, there is a Sawang Harimau (Tiger Hole/Cave) located on the hillside near Tasek Meradun which is about 300 meters away. This area belongs to Awang Kamaruddin who is said to have the ability to become whatever he wants. He can incarnate into a person, into a tiger and also has extraordinary powers. His wife's name is Dang Labai who lives on a hill called Bukit Sinarubai (Sinarubai Hill) which is located in Kampong Sinarubai. Awang Kamaruddin likes to attend weddings, he doesn't care who is holding a wedding with the aim of seeing the bride or virgins who attend the ceremony and if he likes then he will take those women to be his wife. If anyone resists he will take them by force and kill them. This was something no one dared to fight back then. From that day, whenever there is a wedding ceremony, the bride must cover her face with a thin cloth so that men cannot see her clearly.

== Infrastructure ==
Kampong Tasek Meradun and Kampong Bunut received basic facilities from the government including electricity, water, telephone, school, health clinic, roads and so on.

=== Places of interest ===
A wasai (small waterfall) found in the village is Wasai Terjun Tinggi which has a panoramic view is planned to be developed into a place for picnics or recreation due to its location on a hill. To reach Tasek Meradun, visitors have to walk about 20 minutes to get to the wasai. It has been used by local and foreign residents to carry out picnics, leisure and relaxation activities even though the wasai has not been equipped with basic facilities such as special paths, huts, garbage disposal and public toilets.

== Notable people ==
- Pengiran Abu Bakar (1907–1974), legislative speaker
- Pengiran Bahrom (born 1963), politician and educator

== See also ==
- List of neighbourhoods in Bandar Seri Begawan
