= Kampong Bunut Perpindahan =

Village of Brunei

Bunut Perpindahan
- Village and neighbourhood
- Kampong Bunut Perpindahan
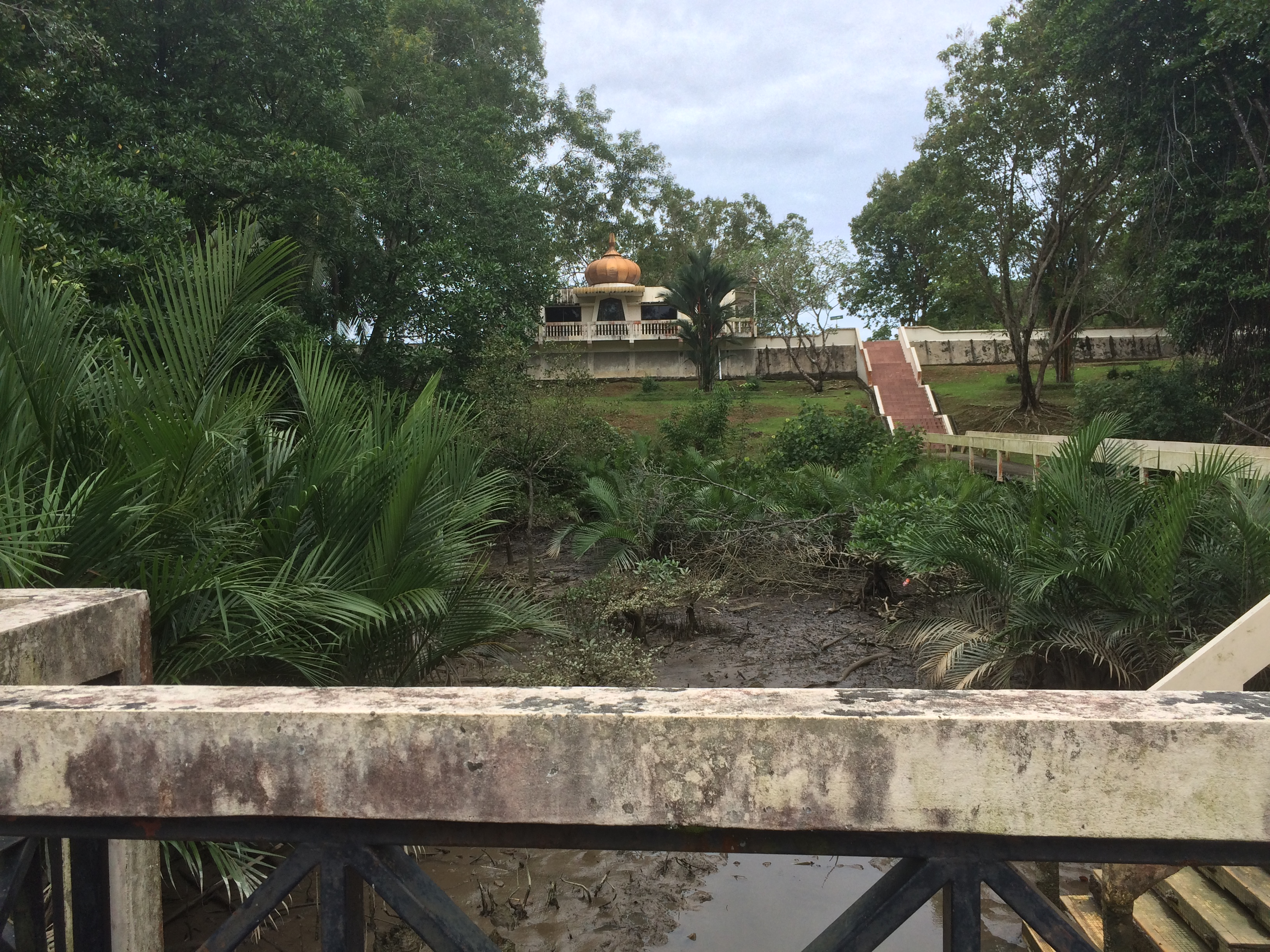
- Makam di Luba

- Location in Brunei
- Coordinates: 4°51′04″N 114°53′19″E
- Country: Brunei
- District: Brunei-Muara
- Mukim: Kilanas
- Established: 1951
- Founder: Halus Abdul Samad

Government
  - Village head: Mohammad Khairoul Johani

Area
  - Total: 0.782 km^{2} (0.302 sq mi)

Population (2016)
  - Total: 1,707
  - Density: 2,180/km^{2} (5,650/sq mi)
- Time zone: UTC+8 (BNT)
- Postcode: BF1220

Kampong Bunut Perpindahan (Malay: Kampung Bunut Perpindahan) or also known as Kampong Perpindahan Bunut, is a village in Brunei-Muara District, Brunei, as well as a neighbourhood in the capital Bandar Seri Begawan. The population was 1,707 in 2016. It is one of the villages within Mukim Kilanas. The postcode is BF1220.

== Etymology ==
The name 'Bunut Perpindahan' (sometimes 'Perpindahan Bunut') literally means 'Bunut Resettlement' and is named after its residential area which has been one of the housing estates under the National Resettlement Scheme (Rancangan Perpindahan Negara), as well as its location being near Kampong Bunut, the original settlement of the name.

== Demography ==
According to the Preliminary Report of the Department of Planning and Economics (JPKE) for the year 2011, this village is inhabited by approximately 1,709 residents consisting of 909 males and 800 females.

== History ==
The settlement was first established in 1951 as the first housing estate under the Resettlement Programme, a government programme for the resettlement of Kampong Ayer residents to land. The first several families who resettled in Bunut Perpindahan were originally the inhabitants of Kampong Pengiran Bendahara Lama, a neighbourhood in Kampong Ayer. They were given incentives to build new homes and additional plot of land for agriculture as new means of sustenance.

== Economy ==
In addition to having a historical place that can be used as a tourist attraction, Kampong Bunut Perpindahan is also an active village in many ways, including actively organizing charity, religious and sports events through the Majlis Perundingan Kampung (MPK).

== Infrastructure ==
Kampong Bunut Perpindahan has access to basic facilities and infrastructure provided by the government through several ministries and government departments including mosques, primary schools and post offices.

=== Places of interest ===
Tomb of Sultan Husin Kamaluddin or also known as Makam di Luba (due to position on Pulau Luba which is an island that separates two rivers namely Damuan River and Brunei River), is located within the village. the bridge that was built to make it easier for visitors to visit the tomb and also often a focus for anglers. Apart from that, the swampy area on Luba Island is also home to one of the monkey species called proboscis monkey.

== Notable people ==
- Halus Abdul Samad (1952–1971), founder of the village.

== See also ==
- Kampong Bunut
- Kampong Tanjong Bunut
- List of public housing estates in Brunei
