= Mukim Kilanas =

Mukim of Brunei

- Mukim
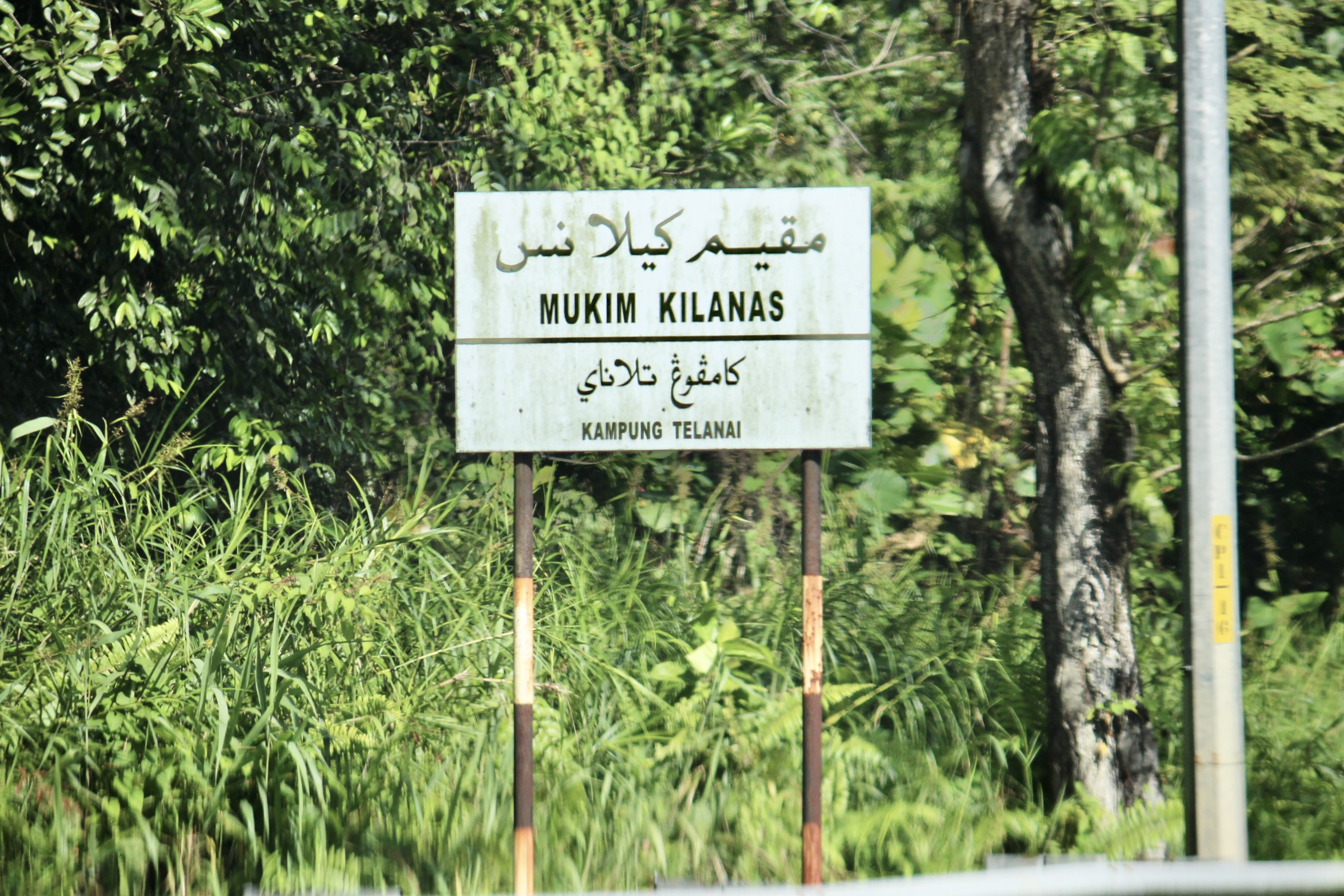

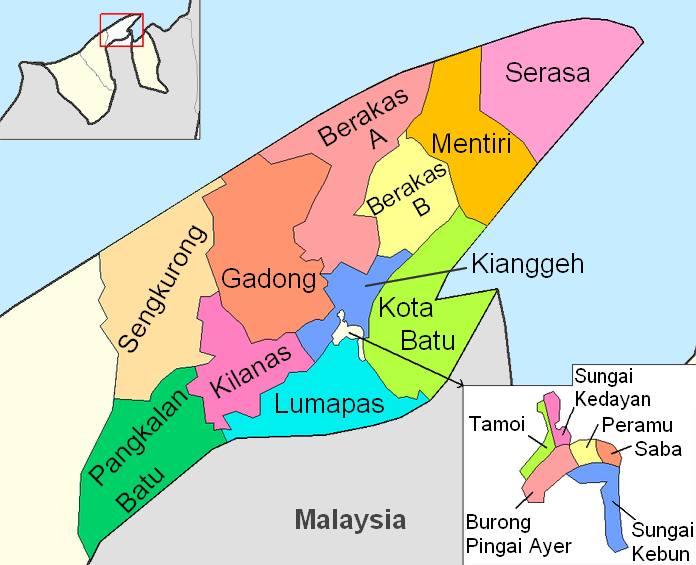
- Kilanas is in dark pink.
- Coordinates: 4°50′57″N 114°52′54″E
- Country: Brunei
- District: Brunei-Muara

Government
  - Penghulu: Hussaini Mohsin

Population (2021)
  - Total: 24,981
- Time zone: UTC+8 (BNT)
- Postcode: BFxx20

Mukim Kilanas is a mukim in Brunei-Muara District, Brunei. The population was 22,492 in 2016.

== Geography ==
The mukim is located in the southwestern part of the district, bordering Mukim Gadong 'B' and Mukim Kianggeh to the north-east, Mukim Lumapas to the east and south, Mukim Pengkalan Batu to the south-west and Mukim Sengkurong to the west and north.

== Transport and connectivity ==
Mukim Kilanas is connected to the capital, Bandar Seri Begawan, and the western districts via the Sultan Hassanal Bolkiah Highway (locally known as Jalan Tutong). The area includes the Kilanas Roundabout, which connects the residential zones of Kilanas with the commercial areas of Gadong and the capital.

== History ==
An ancient graveyard called Makam di Luba once stood on the upper Brunei River. Brunei was allegedly ruled by Sultan Husin Kamaludin during the time. The settlements of Kampong Lumadan, Kampong Telanai, Kampong Sungai Damuan, Kampong Sungai Tamiang, and Kampong Sungai Ketam were among those then present upstream of the Brunei River. Together with the locals, His Majesty enjoys fishing on the hulu (inner) Brunei River's banks, particularly in the coastal region upstream of the Makam di Luba. A kind of wood known as tuba wood that His Majesty frequently brought was 'pupuh-pupuh' and kept in a tin.

Then, along with the locals, His Majesty boarded a large boat to tour the Brunei River. After arriving at the chosen location, tuba water is poured into the river, particularly in the area of the left and right tributaries heading into Kampong Luba. The fish that have been exposed to the tuba water will emerge after roughly 30 minutes, feeble. It was claimed that at the time, the locals would rejoice and be content since they could take the fish home to enjoy with their cherished families. The informant asserts that the majority of fish that are obtained and caught using tuba water are not harmful to the body and are not even intoxicated when consumed. When Sultan Hussin Kamaluddin was in charge, this was the way of life in the village.

The people enjoyed a pleasant and successful time under Sultan Hussin Kamaluddin, who is still referred to as Al-Marhum in Luba. Due to Sultan Hussin Kamaluddin's regular operations in that region, even this nostalgia is still recalled, mentioned, and remembered now. His Majesty and the other residents' spirits will be blessed by Allah Ta'ala, according to the community and the elderly who are still residing there.

== Demography ==
As of 2016 census, the population was 22,492 with 51.9% males and 48.1% females. The mukim had 4,398 households occupying 4,332 dwellings. The mukim is predominantly urban; among the population, 87.9% lived in urban areas in contrast to 12.1% in rural areas.

== Administration ==
Mukim Kilanas contains 11 villages in it namely Kampong Tanjung Bunut; Kampong Kilanas including part of Jalan Bebatik and Kampong Jangsak (administered by a ketua kampung); Kampong Madewa and Kampong Telanai (administered by a ketua kampung); Kampong Bunut Perpindahan; Kampong Tasek Meradun and Kampong Bunut (administered by a ketua kampung); Kampong Bengkurong, Kampong Sinarubai and Kampong Burong Lepas (administered by a ketua kampung). This mukim is administered by a penghulu and has six ketua kampungs.

As of 2021, the mukim comprised the following census villages:

Settlements	Population (2021)	Ketua kampung (2024)
Kampong Madewa	882	Haji Jumat bin Haji Salleh
Kampong Bunut Perpindahan	1,524	Mohammad Khairoul Johani bin Haji Jumat
Kampong Bunut	1,378	Ahmad Hussaini bin Haji Mohsin
Kampong Tasek Meradun	312	Ahmad Hussaini bin Haji Mohsin
Kampong Bengkurong	3,357	Haji Talib bin Haji Bakar
Kampong Sinarubai	2,673	Haji Talib bin Haji Bakar (Acting)
Kampong Burong Lepas	473	Haji Talib bin Haji Bakar (Acting)
Kampong Kilanas	6,357	Haji Mohammad Ameerolbahrynee bin Haji Abdul Hamid (Acting)
Kampong Jangsak	3,950	Haji Mohammad Ameerolbahrynee bin Haji Abdul Hamid
Kampong Tanjong Bunut	2,754	Haji Abd Rahman bin Haji Jumat
Kampong Telanai	1,321	—N/a

Since 2007, Kampong Bunut, Kampong Bunut Perpindahan, Kampong Madewa, Kampong Tasek Meradun and Kampong Telanai have also been included in the municipal area of Bandar Seri Begawan, the country's capital.

== Economy ==
Mukim Kilanas has several products produced by Women's Bureau members in the villages found in Mukim Kilanas. Among them are making traditional sweets that are sold at the stalls, producing some frozen food some of which has already reached Kota Kinabalu and making wedding packages. The residents of Kampung Bunut Perpindahan at that time were allocated two and a half acres of land, and when the residents first moved in, they were provided with money amounting to $60, some livestock such as cows and goats and agricultural seeds. The residents at that time kept livestock in the village.

Due to its proximity to Bandar Seri Begawan and the commercial district of Gadong, Mukim Kilanas functions as a residential suburb. Residents frequently commute to these neighboring areas for employment, supplementing local agricultural and micro-enterprise activities.

== Infrastructure ==
Mukim Kilanas is not exempt from receiving various facilities provided by the government such as water, electricity, clinics and mosques.

=== Education ===
Sayyidina Hasan Secondary School (Sekolah Menengah Sayyidina Hasan) is the sole secondary school in the mukim. It was established in 1994 and celebrated its silver jubilee in 2019.

=== Religious and community facilities ===
The mukim contains several religious and community institutions, including Masjid Kampong Kilanas and Masjid Kampong Bunut, which host Friday prayers and community gatherings. The Mukim Kilanas Community Centre also hosts local events and supports village-level enterprises.
