= Mukim Kiudang =

Mukim in Brunei

- Mukim
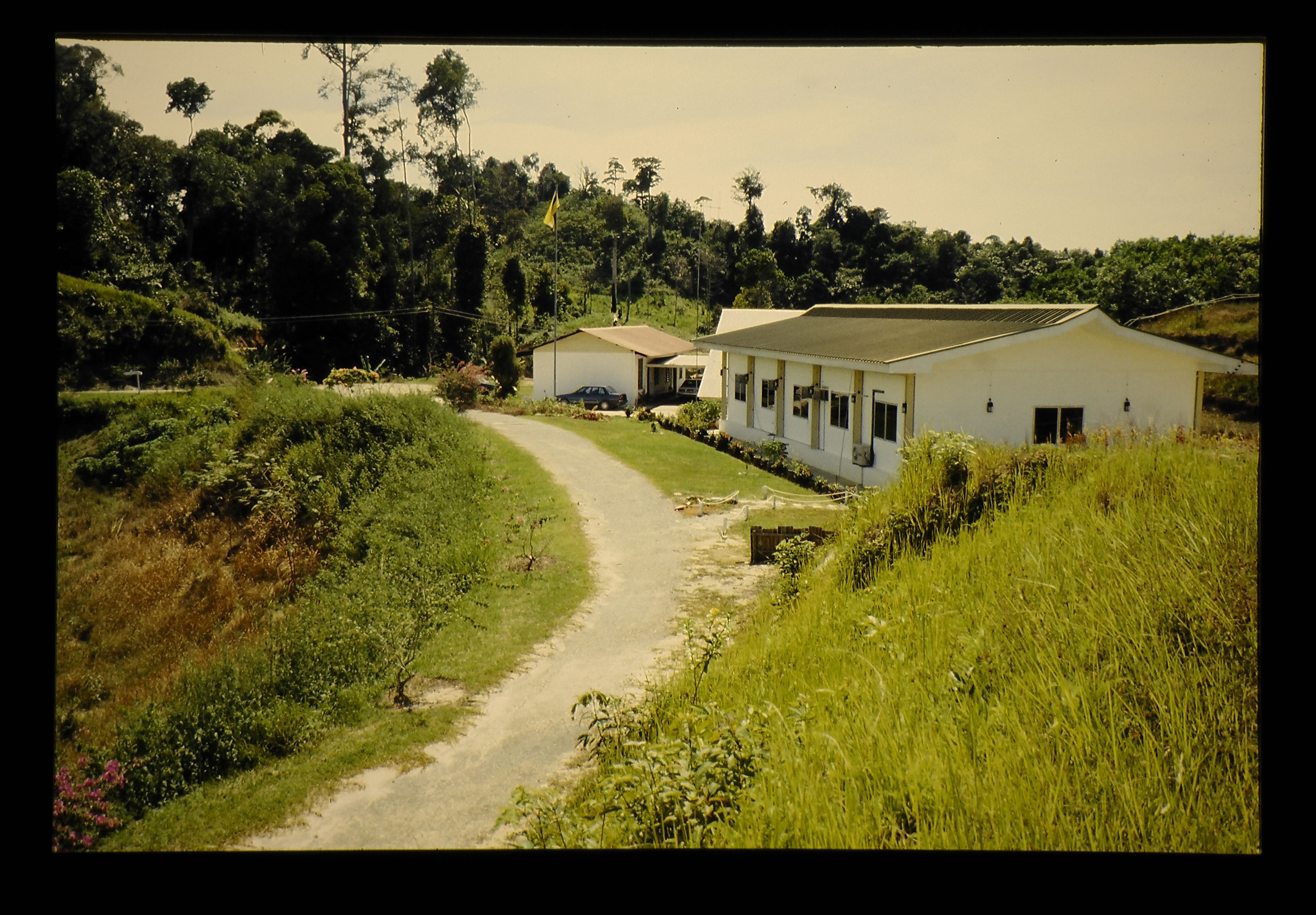
- Birau Research Station in 1989

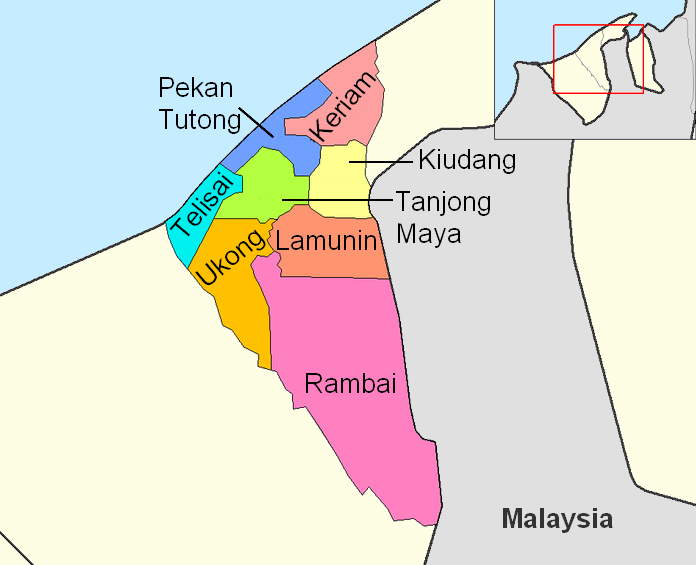
- Kiudang is in yellow.
- Coordinates: 4°40′N 114°42′E
- Country: Brunei
- District: Tutong

Government
  - Penghulu: Jaafar Tinggal

Population (2021)
  - Total: 5,063
- Time zone: UTC+8 (BNT)
- Postcode: TExx43

Mukim Kiudang is a mukim in Tutong District, Brunei. The population was 5,924 in 2016.

== Geography ==
The mukim is located in the eastern part of Tutong District, bordering Mukim Keriam to the north, Mukim Pengkalan Batu (in Brunei-Muara District) to the north-east, Sarawak in Malaysia to the south-east, Mukim Lamunin to the south, Mukim Tanjong Maya to the west and Mukim Pekan Tutong to the north-west.

== Demographics ==
As of 2016 census, the population was 5,924 with 52.7% males and 47.3% females. The mukim had 1,039 households occupying 1,003 dwellings. The entire population lived in rural areas.

== Administration ==
As of 2021, the mukim comprised the following villages:

Settlements	Population (2021)	Ketua kampung (2024)
Kampong Luagan Timbaran	304	—N/a
Kampong Birau	918	Masburah bin Suhaile
Kampong Kebia	735	Masburah bin Suhaile
Kampong Bakiau	169	Suhili bin Alas
Kampong Pangkalan Mau	573	Suhili bin Alas
Kampong Batang Mitus	634	Suhili bin Alas
Kampong Mungkom	192	—N/a
Kampong Kiudang	1,016	Muhammad Rifaie bin Haji Abdul Rahim @ Cyril Wong Selangkir
Kampong Pad Nunok	522	Muhammad Rifaie bin Haji Abdul Rahim @ Cyril Wong Selangkir

== Villages ==
=== Kampong Pad Nunok ===
Batu Mapan Recreational Waterfall (Rekreasi Wasai Batu Mapan) is a natural region that is abundant in flora and fauna and is tranquil, surrounded by hills, trees, and a foggy environment, making it appropriate to be utilized for recreational activities in addition to economic activities and nature tourism. Eight houses, two rest huts, a mini stage, a control hut, a public restroom, six benches, and a memorial monument representing three pillars with the concept of three communities of the village residents Pad Nunok, namely the Tutong Malays, Dusun Malays, and the Chinese community, have all been built in order to maintain the potential of the recreation park.

According to the author's research, the residents of Pad Nunok are well known for their distinctive handicrafts, particularly those made from waste materials and natural materials like hats and baskets by utilizing materials like paper and plastic as well as natural resources like rattan and a grass variety known as Buyu. There has been increasing demands for handmade goods, particularly domestic demand during the holiday season. The village handicrafts are also on display at the Royal Tools Museum in partnership with the Tutong District Office, despite the fact that none of the crafts created so far have ever been exported.
