= Kampong Bakiau =

Village in Brunei

Kampong Bakiau Kampung Bakiau
- Village
- Location in Brunei
- Coordinates: 4°46′06″N 114°43′54″E
- Country: Brunei
- District: Tutong
- Mukim: Kiudang
- First settled: 19th century

Government
  - Village head: Suhili Alas

Area
  - Total: 1.3 km^{2} (0.50 sq mi)

Population (2021)
  - Total: 169
  - Density: 130/km^{2} (340/sq mi)
- Time zone: UTC+8 (BNT)
- Postcode: TE1143

Kampong Bakiau (Note: from the Malay name, lit. "Bakiau Village") (Malay: Kampung Bakiau) is a village in the north-east of Tutong District, Brunei, about 23 kilometres (14 mi) from the district town of Tutong, Mukim Kiudang. It has an area of 1.3 square kilometres (0.50 sq mi); the population was 169 in 2021.

== Etymology ==
The name "Kampong Bakiau" is derived from the Dusun word iau, meaning "alive." According to oral traditions, the origin of the name is linked to a series of events associated with miraculous recoveries from death. One story recounts a villager who was presumed dead and placed against a large tree near the burial site. Before the burial could take place, the individual unexpectedly came back to life. The tree where this occurred became known as the iau or ketiau tree, and over time, the area was named Bakiau.

Another version tells of a Dusun villager suffering from a highly contagious disease called Supak. Believed to be incurable, the individual was relocated to an isolated hill and left to die, leaning against a large tree. Despite being abandoned without food, the villager remained alive, prompting visitors to remark "kekal iau," meaning "still alive." The repeated use of this phrase eventually led to the site being named Bakiau.

A third tale involves an elderly woman from the village who was gravely ill and believed to have died. Her family moved her body to a large tree, only for her grandson to later discover that she had come back to life. He exclaimed in Dusun, "Ba-aki-yau," meaning "Grandmother lives." This phrase evolved into the name Bakiau, which was eventually standardised in official records.

While the details of these stories vary, they all revolve around the theme of someone presumed dead being miraculously restored to life. Initially, iau referred specifically to the tree associated with these events, but over time, the term became the name of the location and later the village. These accounts suggest that Kampong Bakiau was originally a settlement of the Dusun people before the arrival of the Tutong people.

== Administration ==
Kampong Bakiau and the neighbouring village Kampong Pengkalan Mau shares a village head and Village Consultative Council.

The first ketua kampung (village head) of Kampong Bakiau, appointed by the residents, was Dollah bin Imam Sulong. He was succeeded by Inja bin Tabuk, followed by Awang Talipuddin bin Sahbudin, and later Awang Haji Mohd. Noor bin Udin. In the 1950s, Awang Haji Mohd. Noor was officially recognised by the government as the village head, a position he held until 1978. That same year, the role was taken over by Pengiran Haji Othman bin Pengiran Salleh, who served until 1981. In 1982, Pengiran Haji Othman was appointed as penghulu of Mukim Kiudang, a role he held until 1999, during which he was also responsible for acting as the village head of Kampong Bakiau. In 1999, Major (Retired) Haji Mohammad Shah bin Haji Mohd. Noor was appointed as the village head of Kampong Bakiau, a position he held until 30 September 2002. On 1 October 2002, he was officially appointed as the penghulu of Mukim Kiudang.

== Infrastructure ==
The development of education in Kampong Bakiau began in 1957 when the villagers established a temporary school building to cater to the educational needs of their children. Prior to this, students from the village attended Kiudang Primary School, which had been operating since 1938. In 1961, the government allocated land in Kampong Bakiau for the construction of a permanent school building. The new school was equipped with various facilities, including a multipurpose hall and a football field. Its construction was a community effort, led by Md. Noor bin Udin, Hashim bin Bakir, Talib bin Haji Md. Noor, and Pengiran Othman bin Pengiran Salleh. Upon completion, the school enrolled 29 students—14 boys and 15 girls—studying in Primary I and II under the leadership of its first headmaster, Umar Ali bin Esong. Bakiau Primary School was officially opened on 24 October 1962 and was initially known as Sekolah Melayu Bakiau ("Bakiau Malay School").

== Mythology ==
In Kampong Bukit Bekiau, there is an intriguing story about the origin of the name of a hill, Bukit Tiong. The hill was named after a bird called the tiung (Myna), known for its remarkable ability to mimic human speech. According to oral tradition in Kampong Bekiau, a villager once kept a tiung and taught it to speak whenever he approached or fed it. The bird's tongue was remarkably soft and quick to imitate the words spoken by its owner.

One day, by accident, the owner released the bird to protect it from an enemy attack. As the tiung flew freely from the yard, it perched on a tree atop a hill where other tiungs had their nests. There, the bird began conversing with the other tiungs it encountered. The noise became deafening, as the conversation between the birds sounded like a crowd of people talking. The cacophony of sounds unsettled the enemy forces, who had been hiding in the forest on that very hill. The enemy grew anxious and confused, thinking that their movements and hiding places were being observed by the villagers. Fearing an imminent attack, they became too frightened to stay and decided to flee, abandoning their plans to launch an assault.

In honour of the event, the villagers named the hill Bukit Tiong, taking the name from the bird that had caused the disturbance. From that time on, the village was no longer threatened by enemy raids, and the people were able to live peacefully and safely once more.
