= Kampong Madewa =

Village in Brunei

- Village and neighbourhood
- Location in Brunei
- Coordinates: 4°51′21″N 114°53′43″E
- Country: Brunei
- District: Brunei-Muara
- Mukim: Kilanas

Government
  - Village head: Jumat Salleh

Population (2016)
  - Total: 865
- Time zone: UTC+8 (BNT)
- Postcode: BF1120

Kampong Madewa is a village in Brunei-Muara District, Brunei, as well as a neighbourhood in the capital Bandar Seri Begawan. The population was 865 in 2016. It is one of the villages within Mukim Kilanas. The postcode is BF1120.
