= Kampong Kebia =

- Village
- Location in Brunei
- Coordinates: 4°46′13″N 114°44′42″E
- Country: Brunei
- District: Tutong
- Mukim: Kiudang

Government
  - Village head: Masburah Suhaile

Population (2016)
  - Total: 733
- Time zone: UTC+8 (BNT)
- Postcode: TE2743

Kampong Kebia is a village in Tutong District, Brunei. The population was 733 in 2016. It is one of the villages within Mukim Kiudang, a mukim subdivision in the district.
