= Pehin Khatib Abdullah Mosque =

Mosque in Kulapis, Brunei-Muara, Brunei

- Masjid Pehin Khatib Abdullah
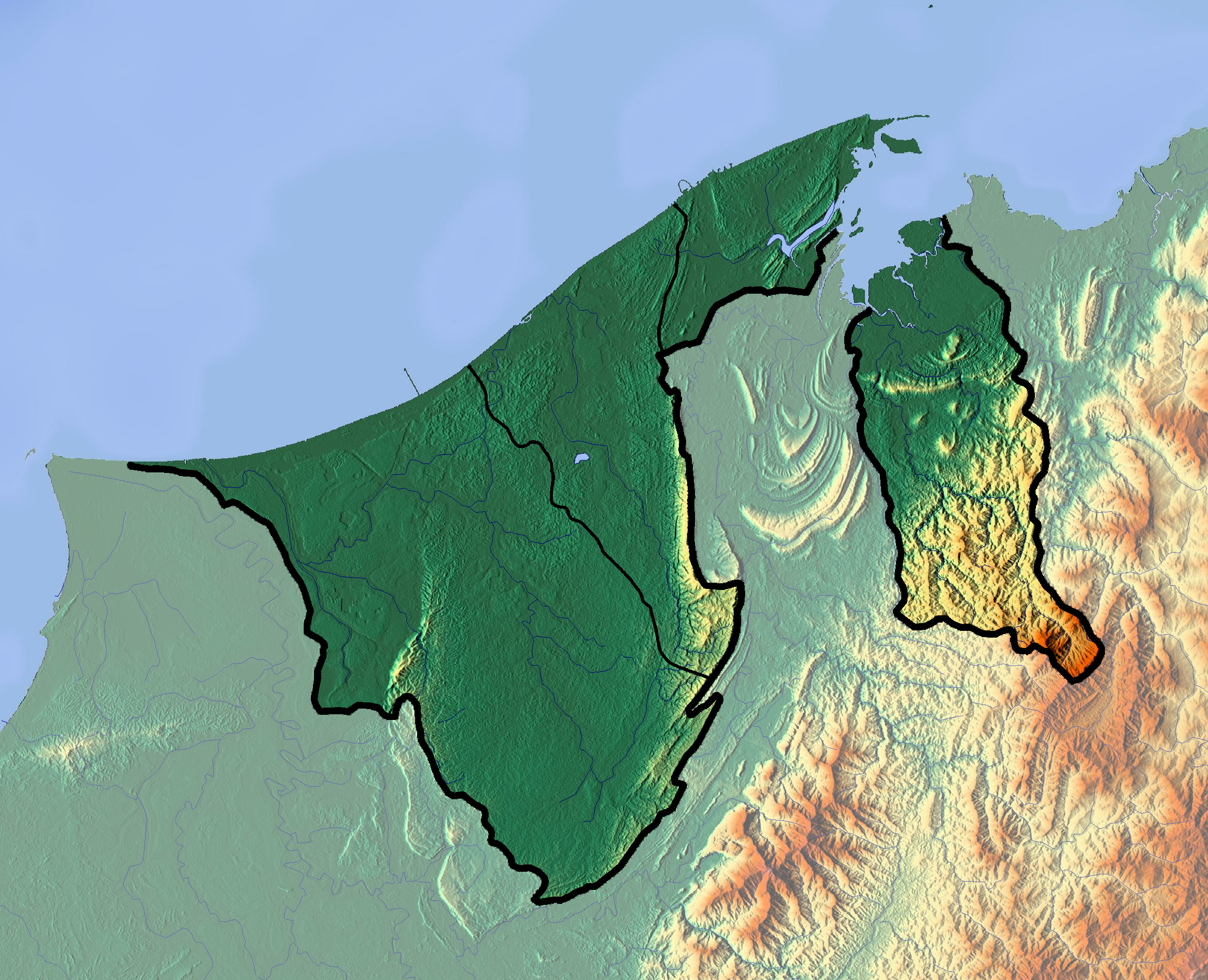
- Location of the mosque in Brunei

Religion
- Affiliation: Sunni Islam
- Ecclesiastical or organizational status: Mosque
- Status: Active

Location
- Location: Kulapis, Brunei-Muara
- Country: Brunei
- Interactive map of Pehin Khatib Abdullah Mosque
- Coordinates: 4°51′05.6″N 114°49′23.8″E

Architecture
- Type: mosque
- Completed: 2017

Specifications
- Capacity: 700 worshipers
- Site area: c. 2 ha (4.9 acres)

Pehin Khatib Abdullah Mosque (Malay: Masjid Pehin Khatib Abdullah) is a mosque located in Kulapis, a settlement in Brunei-Muara District, Brunei. It was inaugurated in May 2017; it can accommodate 700 worshippers. The mosque serves the need of the Muslim residents in Kulapis for Islamic communal prayers and activities, in particular the Jumu'ah or Friday prayers.

== History ==
The construction of the mosque began on 14 September 2015 and completed in less than two years. It was officially opened on 19 May 2017 by Sultan Hassanal Bolkiah, the Sultan of Brunei after attending the first ever Jumu'ah being held in the mosque. The mosque was funded as a waqf or endowment from an anonymous donor and built on about 2 hectares (4.9 acres) of state land.

== See also ==
- List of mosques in Brunei
- Islam in Brunei
