= Kampong Sinarubai =

- Village
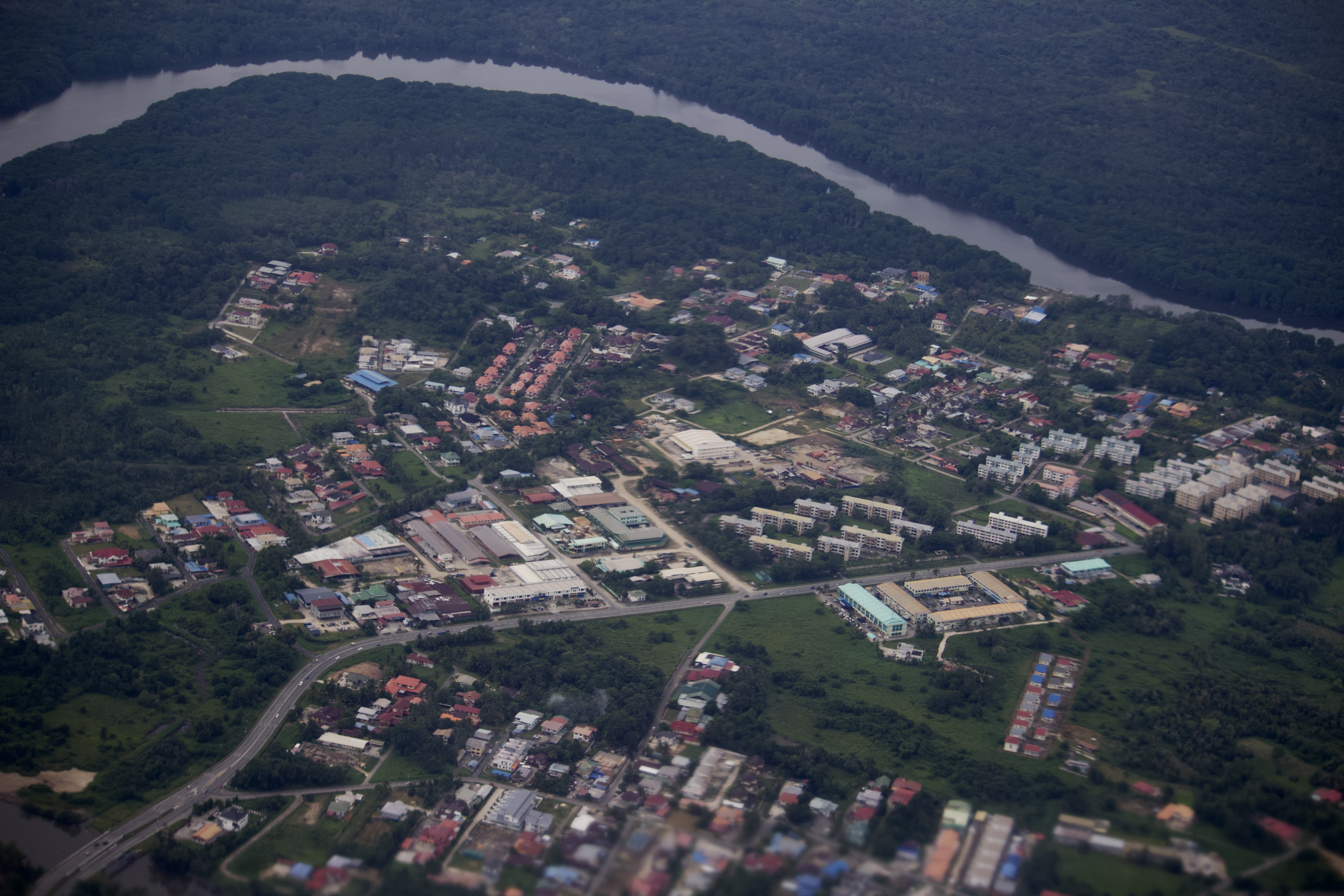

- Location in Brunei
- Coordinates: 4°50′18″N 114°52′25″E
- Country: Brunei
- District: Brunei-Muara
- Mukim: Kilanas

Government
  - Village head: Talib Bakar

Population (2016)
  - Total: 2,319
- Time zone: UTC+8 (BNT)
- Postcode: BF2120

Kampong Sinarubai is a village in Brunei-Muara District, Brunei, on the outskirts of the capital Bandar Seri Begawan. The population was 2,319 in 2016. It is one of the villages within Mukim Kilanas. The postcode is BF2120. The village is under the responsibility of the village head of Kampong Bengkurong.
