= Kampong Burong Lepas =

- Village
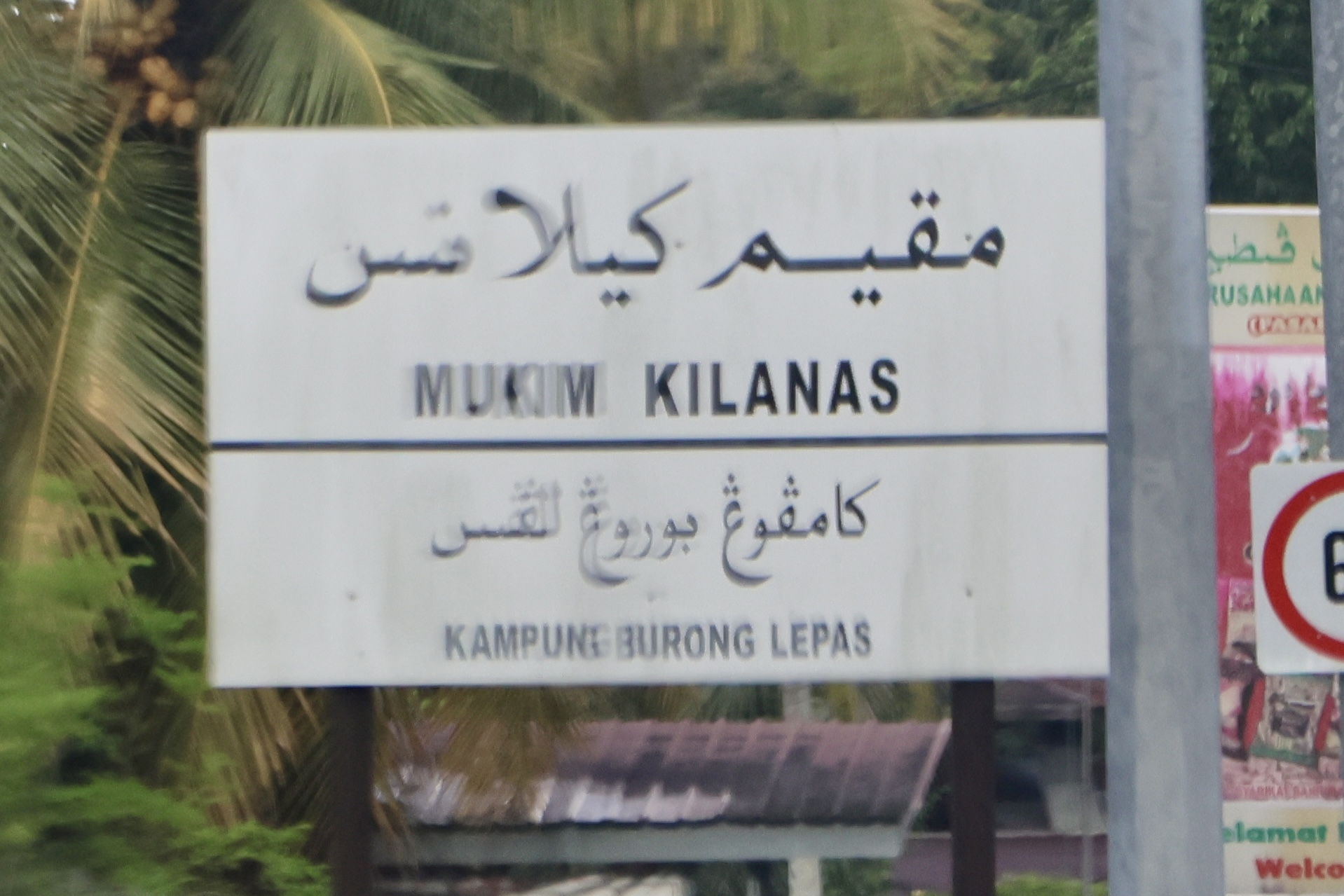

- Location in Brunei
- Coordinates: 4°49′41″N 114°51′52″E
- Country: Brunei
- District: Brunei-Muara
- Mukim: Kilanas

Government
  - Village head: Talib Bakar

Population (2016)
  - Total: 395
- Time zone: UTC+8 (BNT)
- Postcode: BF1720

Kampong Burong Lepas is a village in Brunei-Muara District, Brunei, on the outskirts of the capital Bandar Seri Begawan. The population was 395 in 2016. It is one of the villages within Mukim Kilanas. The postcode is BF1720. The village is under the responsibility of the village head of Kampong Bengkurong.
