= Kampong Batang Mitus =

Batang Mitus
- Village
- Kampong Batang Mitus
- Location in Brunei
- Coordinates: 4°45′14″N 114°45′36″E
- Country: Brunei
- District: Tutong
- Mukim: Kiudang

Government
  - Village head: Suhili Alas

Area
  - Total: 13.5 km^{2} (5.2 sq mi)

Population (2016)
  - Total: 708
  - Density: 52.4/km^{2} (136/sq mi)
- Time zone: UTC+8 (BNT)
- Postcode: TE2543

Kampong Batang Mitus (Malay: Kampung Batang Mitus) or simply known as Batang Mitus, is a village in Tutong District, Brunei, about 25 kilometres (16 mi) from the district town Pekan Tutong. The population was 708 in 2016. It is one of the villages within Mukim Kiudang, a mukim subdivision in the district.

== Demography ==
As of 2018, the village is inhabited by 1,102 residents and there are 105 houses.

== Economy ==
Kampong Batang Mitus has its own products produced by the people of the village in the form of hand-woven crafts such as takiding, baskets and mats. In addition, they also like to cultivate. One of the participants of the Kawasan Kemajuan Pertanian (KKP), Awang Suhili bin Alas stated that the KKP was initially known as the Projek Kemajuan Luar Bandar (PKLB) and was explored in 1995 with an area of 110 acres. He said again, KKP has a membership of 50 people, where each member is given two acres per person. Among the very popular plants grown in this KKP are various types of durian, such as yellow durian/otak udang, white durian, durian kahwin, pulu durian, in addition to tarap, cat's eye and kembayau plants. The latest is to grow durian musang king on a small scale. To get quick results, some of the members cultivate crops such as banana trees and pineapples.

== Infrastructure ==
The residents of this village have access to basic facilities provided by the Government of Brunei, just like other villages in the country, such as schools, public halls, electricity supply, clean water supply, telephone lines, paved roads and so on. In addition, the villagers are also given attention in the form of Welfare Assistance and Old Age Pension as well as Welfare Assistance from the Community Development Department (JAPEM), Ministry of Culture, Youth and Sports.

The village primary school is Batang Mitus Primary School. It also shares grounds with Batang Mitus Religious School, the village school for the country's Islamic religious primary education.

== Notable people ==
- Razimie Ramlli (born 1990), footballer
