= Kampong Pengkalan Mau =

- Village
- Location within Brunei
- Coordinates: 4°45′27″N 114°44′23″E
- Country: Brunei
- District: Tutong
- Mukim: Kiudang

Government
  - Village head: Suhili Alas
- Postcode: TE1343

Kampong Pengkalan Mau (or Kampong Pangkalan Mau; Malay for Pengkalan Mau Village) is a village situated in the eastern part of Tutong District, Brunei, within the mukim of Kiudang. The incumbent village head is Mohd Taib bin Jaludin, who is also the village head for Kampong Bakiau. The postcode for Kampong Pengkalan Mau is TE1343.
