= Kampong Lumapas =

- Village
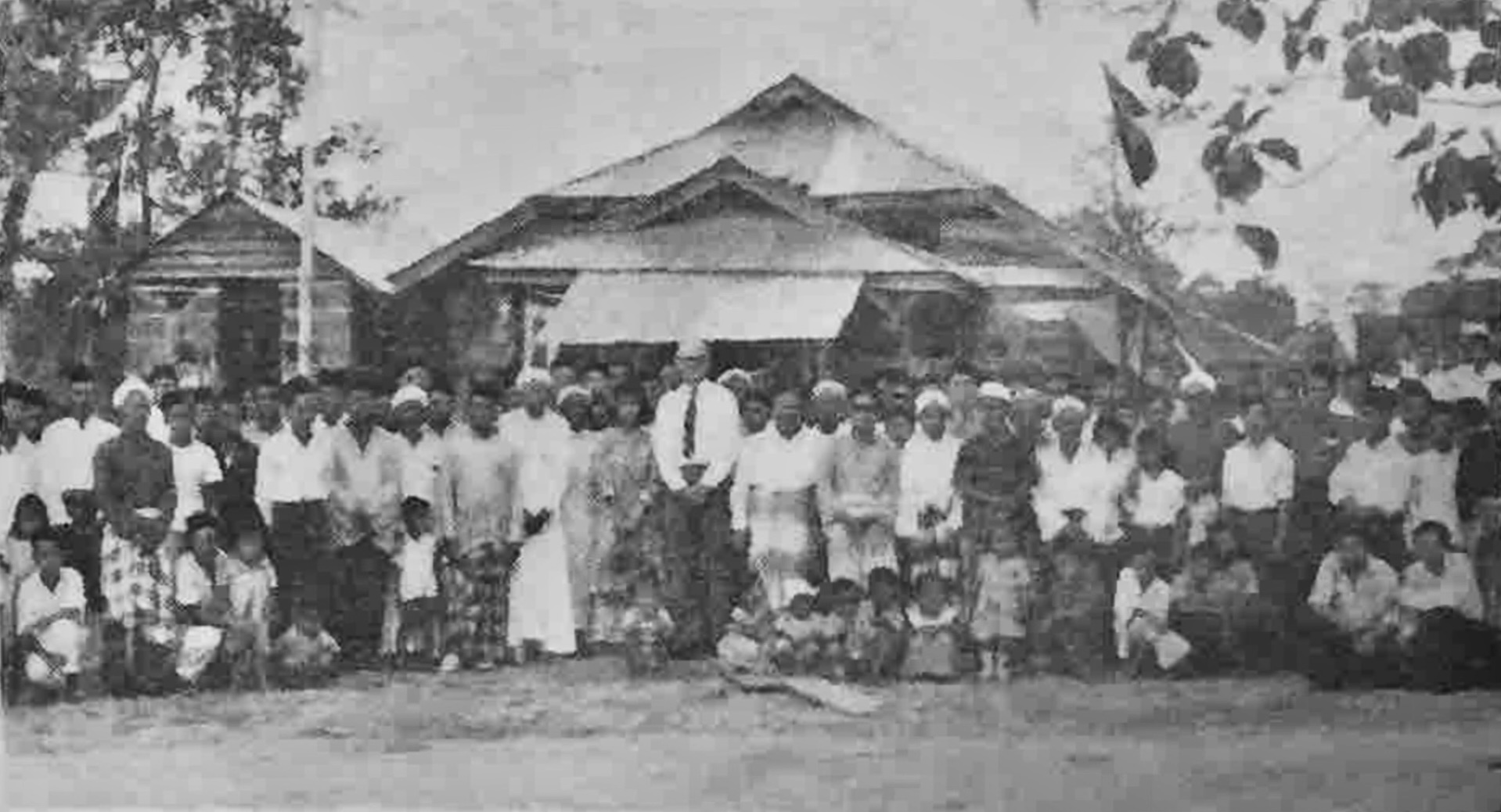
- Lumapas Mosque in 1964

- Location in Brunei
- Coordinates: 4°49′22″N 114°54′36″E
- Country: Brunei
- District: Brunei-Muara
- Mukim: Lumapas

Government
  - Village head: Amran Maidin (Area A); Ali Tanjong (Area B)

Population (2016)
  - Total: 2,709
- Time zone: UTC+8 (BNT)
- Postcode: BJ3324

Kampong Lumapas is a village in Brunei-Muara District, Brunei, located in the southern outskirts of the capital Bandar Seri Begawan. The population was 2,709 in 2016. It is one of the villages within Mukim Lumapas.

== Facilities ==
- Lumapas Primary School is the village primary school, whereas Lumapas Religious School is the village school for the country's Islamic religious primary education.
- The village mosque is Kampong Lumapas Mosque. The construction was completed in 1995; it can accommodate 700 worshippers.
- Bukit Saeh Recreational Park is a recreational park near Saeh Hill.
