= Kampong Jangsak =

Kampong Jangsak Kampung Jangsak
- Village
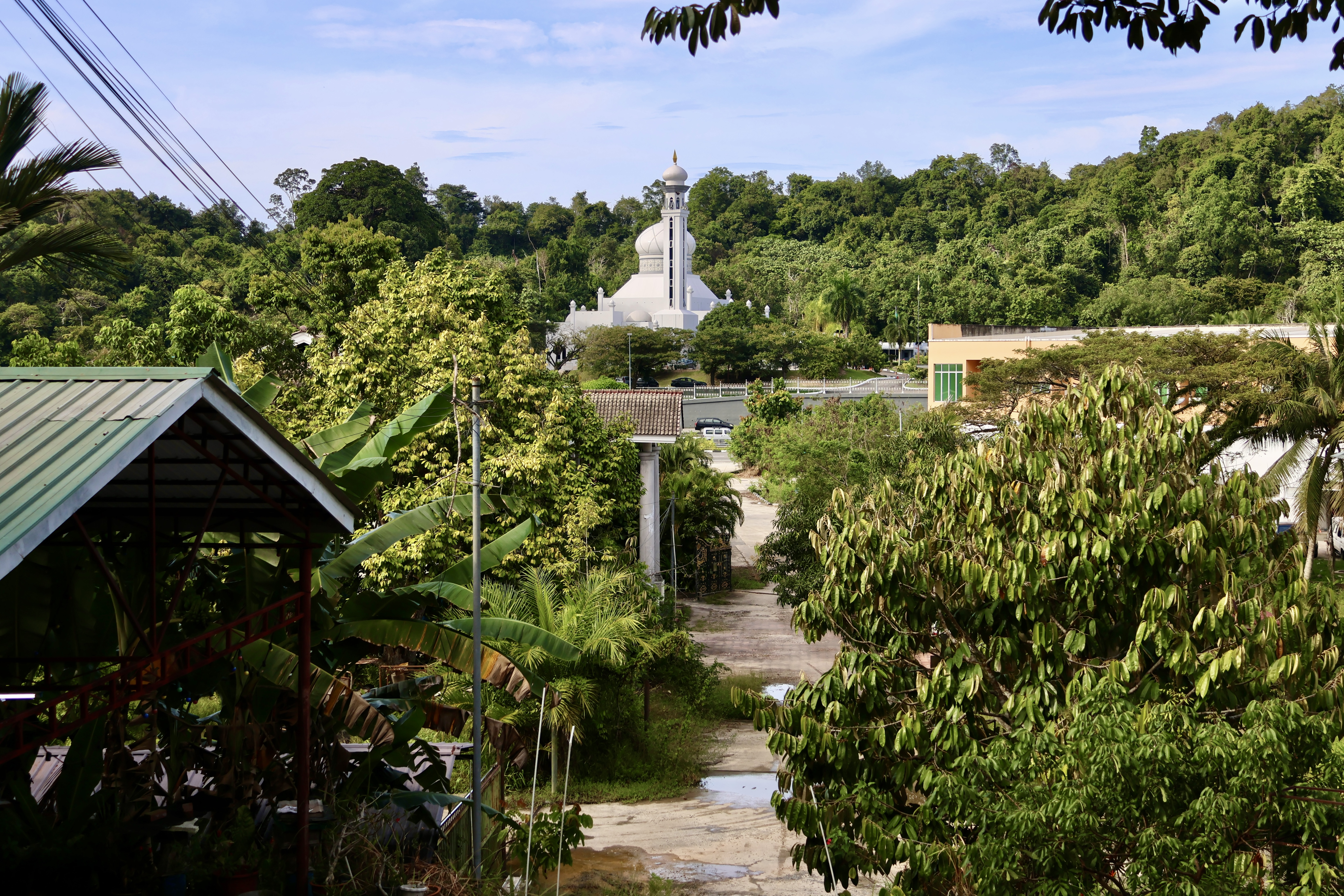
- Jubli Perak Sultan Hassanal Bolkiah Mosque

- Location in Brunei
- Coordinates: 4°52′52″N 114°52′15″E
- Country: Brunei
- District: Brunei-Muara
- Mukim: Kilanas

Government
  - Village head: Mohammad Ameerolbahrynee

Population (2016)
  - Total: 2,968
- Time zone: UTC+8 (BNT)
- Postcode: BF2720

Kampong Jangsak is a village in Brunei-Muara District, Brunei, on the outskirts of the capital Bandar Seri Begawan. The population was 2,968 in 2016. It is one of the villages within Mukim Kilanas. The postcode is BF2720.

== Infrastructure ==
The village mosque is Sultan Haji Hassanal Bolkiah Silver Jubilee Mosque; it was opened on 29 April 1999 and can accommodate 1,200 worshippers.

The village is also home to the Embassy of Qatar.

== Notable people ==
- Sawal Rajab (1950–2007), Bruneian writer
