= Petani =

Village in Tutong District, Brunei

Kampong Petani Kampung Petani
- Village
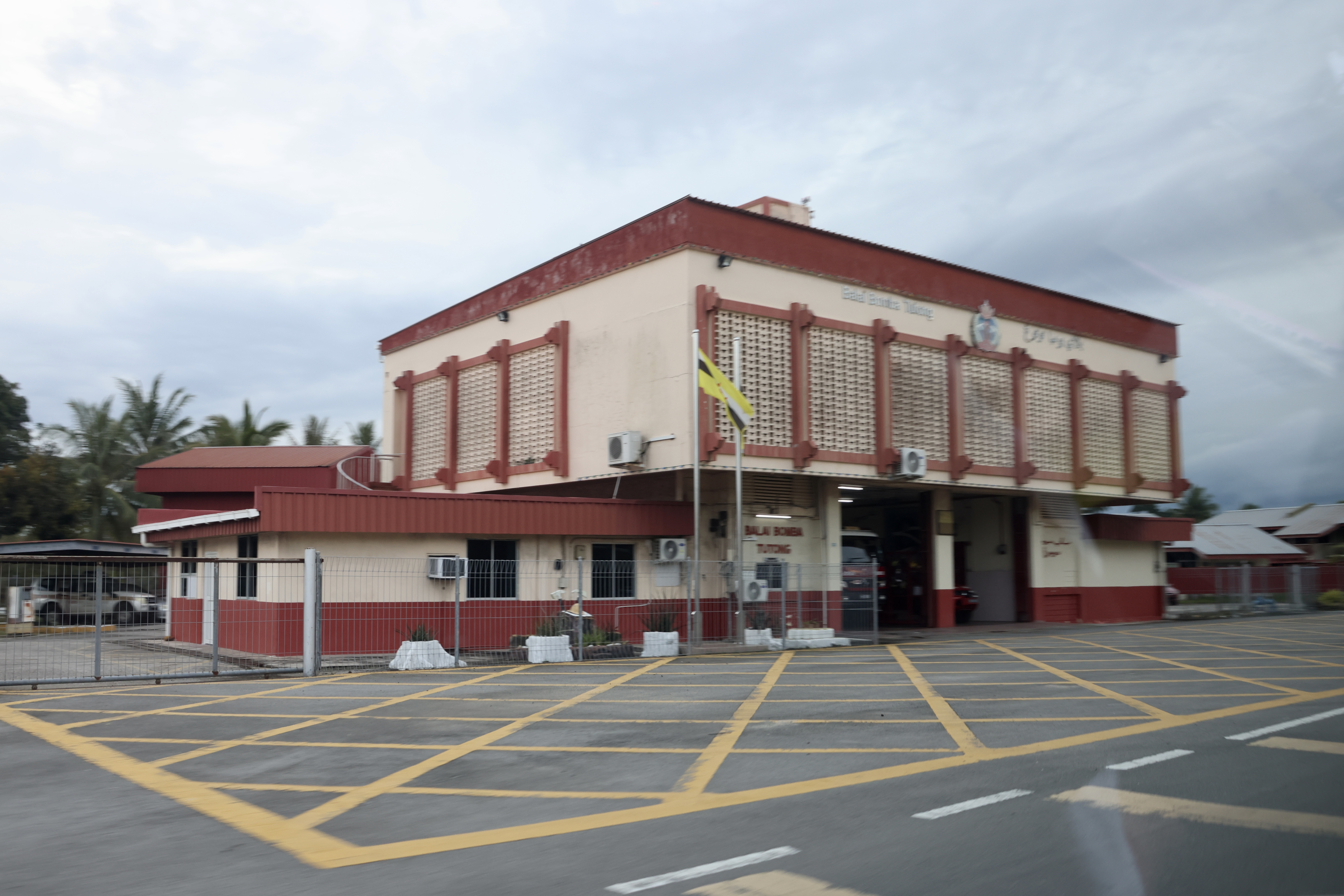
- The Tutong fire station, located on the former site of the original Kampong Petani

- Location in Brunei
- Coordinates: 4.8032108°N 114.6562972°E
- Country: Brunei
- District: Tutong
- Mukim: Pekan Tutong
- First settled: 19th century
- Incorporated as a town: 20th century

Government
  - Village head: Zambri Ibrahim

Area
  - Total: 0.8 km^{2} (0.31 sq mi)

Population (2002)
  - Total: 1,025
  - Density: 1,300/km^{2} (3,300/sq mi)
- Postcode: TA1741

Kampong Petani (Malay: Kampung Petani), also simply known as Petani, is a populated area located in Tutong, the main town of Tutong District, Brunei. It is officially recognised as a village-level subdivision under the mukim (subdistrict) of Pekan Tutong, and it also serves as a designated postcode area with the postcode TA1741. Additionally, parts of the Petani area fall under the spatial jurisdiction of the Tutong municipality.

Covering an area of 0.8 square kilometres (0.31 sq mi), Kampong Petani is situated within Pekan Tutong. As of 2002, the village had a population of approximately 1,025 residents, primarily consisting of Tutong, Bruneian Malays, and Chinese communities. The original settlement site of Kampong Petani was located at the current site of the fire station, while the police station was later established on land that was also part of the village's former settlement area.

== Etymology ==
The origin of the name Kampong Petani comes from the phrase 'patah ni' or 'patah', referring to an event related to a broken bridge in the village. The bridge was built at the river mouth of the village and was frequently used by the locals to cross to nearby villages. Because the bridge was not structurally strong, the villagers often warned those using it to be cautious with the phrase "patah ni" (meaning "this is broken"). When the bridge eventually broke, the place became known as Petani.

== Geography ==
Kampong Petani, originally located along a small river that is now the site of the Fire and Rescue Department in Tutong town, has evolved into a significant hub within the area. Its strategic position along the riverbank, connecting the sea and inland regions via the Tutong River, made it a key point for trade and daily affairs. This accessibility attracted people from surrounding villages, transforming Petani into a central hub, or "pekan," for the region. Over time, it became a strategic area for commerce and administration, eventually serving as the central "capital" under the British Resident.

== History ==
In 1900, the area was a small community consisting of a few shops and four or five modest homes. The transformation of the village began with the construction of its first government building in 1910, its official establishment in 1911, and the start of oil drilling in 1913. Significant growth and modernisation followed in 1918 with the establishment of the village's first Malay vernacular school, marking the beginning of its expansion and eventual renaming to Tutong.

During the 1920s, the settlement rapidly developed into one of the key centres of progress in the Tutong District. This period saw the establishment of important institutions such as schools, shops, and government offices, which elevated the village's status to that of Tutong town. The construction of a road in 1938 further enhanced the area's accessibility and growth, while a mosque built in the 1920s became a significant landmark for the community.

By 1968, the original location of Kampong Petani was repurposed for a new fire station constructed by the government along the Tutong River near the market. Fully operational by 19 April 1969, the fire station was staffed with 104 qualified firefighters and equipped to serve the town and its surrounding areas, marking another milestone in the evolution of the village.

== Administration ==
The first ketua kampung (village head) of Kampong Petani appointed by the villagers was Orang Kaya Setia Negara Awang Safar bin Mohd Salleh. He was later replaced by Datu Setia Diraja Haji Mohd Yusof bin Tarif, and then by Pengiran Radin bin Pengiran Dipa. After that, the village no longer had a village head, and the administration of the village has been handled by the penghulu of Mukim Pekan Tutong.

== Infrastructure ==
In 1918, an agricultural school called Petani Malay School was founded, making this community more developed in terms of education than other villages in Tutong District. It faced the Tutong River at the base of the hill. Additionally, this school serves as a learning hub for the locals of Kampong Petani, including Kampong Suran and Kampong Panchor. It was Abdul Wahab bin Abdul Rahman who served as the school's first headmaster. Around 75% of pupils were enrolled in schools nationwide in 1928, with it having 78% of the total enrolled at Petani Malay School.

Tutong Central Mall is a shopping mall located within the village.
