= Kampong Bengkurong =

- Village
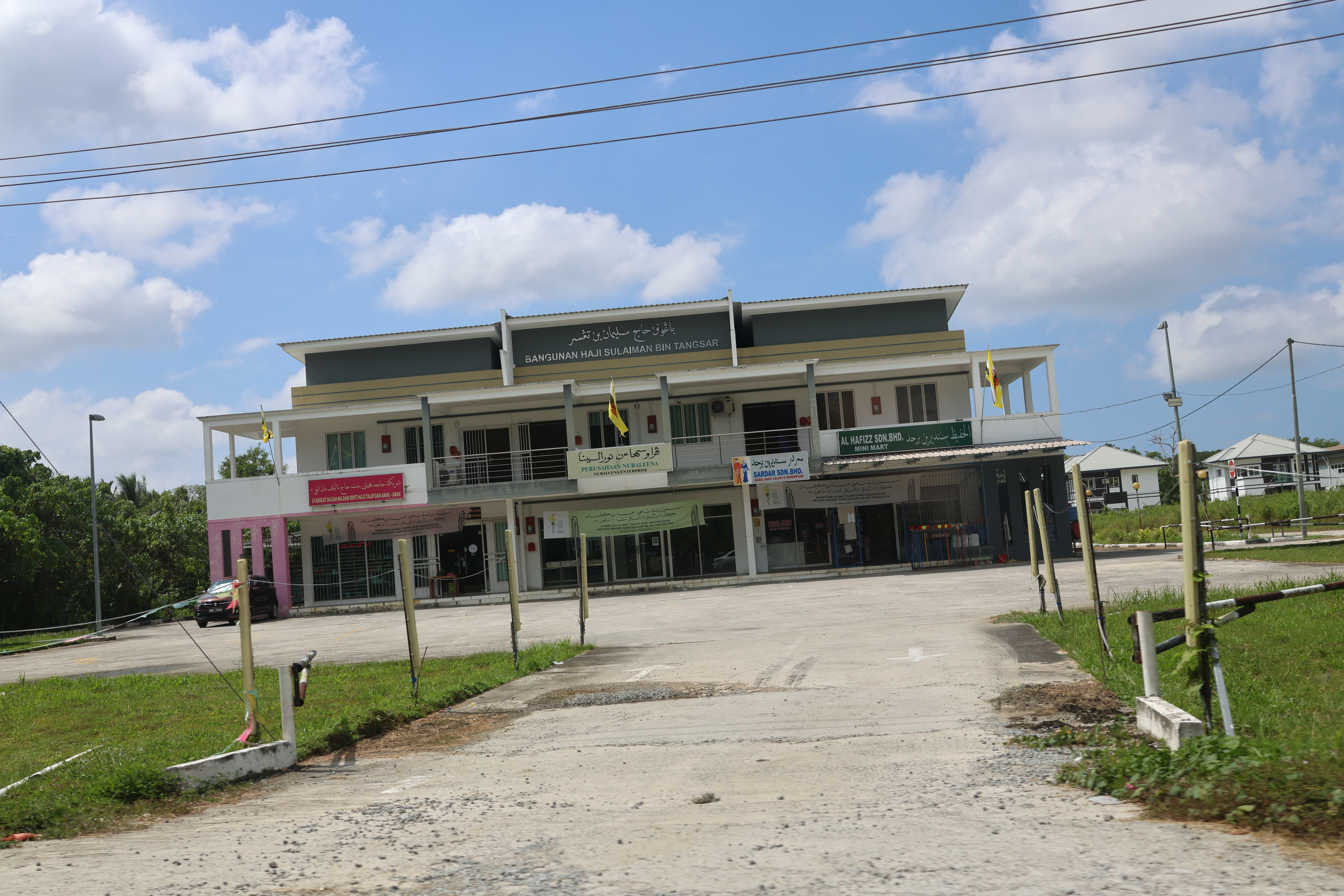

- Location in Brunei
- Coordinates: 4°50′57″N 114°52′05″E
- Country: Brunei
- District: Brunei-Muara
- Mukim: Kilanas

Government
  - Village head: Talib Bakar

Population (2016)
  - Total: 3,583
- Time zone: UTC+8 (BNT)
- Postcode: BF1920

Kampong Bengkurong is a village in Brunei-Muara District, Brunei, on the outskirts of the capital Bandar Seri Begawan. The population was 3,583 in 2016. It is one of the villages within Mukim Kilanas. The postcode is BF1920.

== Etymology ==
The names Sengkurong and Bengkurong have a number of different origin stories, but according to Dusun speakers, Sengkurong means Kurong People and Bengkurong means Kurong River. In the past, the region around Sengkurong/Bengkurong was probably known as Kurong. Kurong can also refer to an enclosure. The river that once ran through the area meandered, as do most rivers. It formerly meandered so much that it virtually formed a circle around the location. According to legend, this river's meandering sections once intersected and formed a circle when flooding occurred, but this circular path was interrupted because of the river's rapid flow. Geographically speaking, the circle creates an oxbow lake that is completely cut off from the river. The name kurong, which means to be contained, survived the disappearance of the cut-off portion through time.

== Administration ==
The village head oversees the village proper, as well as the villages of Kampong Burong Lepas and Kampong Sinarubai.

== Infrastructure ==
Bengkurong Primary School is the village primary school, whereas Pengiran Muda Abdul Malik Religious School is the village school for the country's Islamic religious primary education.

The village mosque is Kampong Bengkurong Mosque; it was inaugurated on 26 February 1988 and can accommodate 800 worshippers.

== Notable people ==
- Dani Ibrahim (born 1949), politician and nobleman
