= Kampong Kilanas =

Village in Brunei

Kilanas
- Village
- Kampong Kilanas
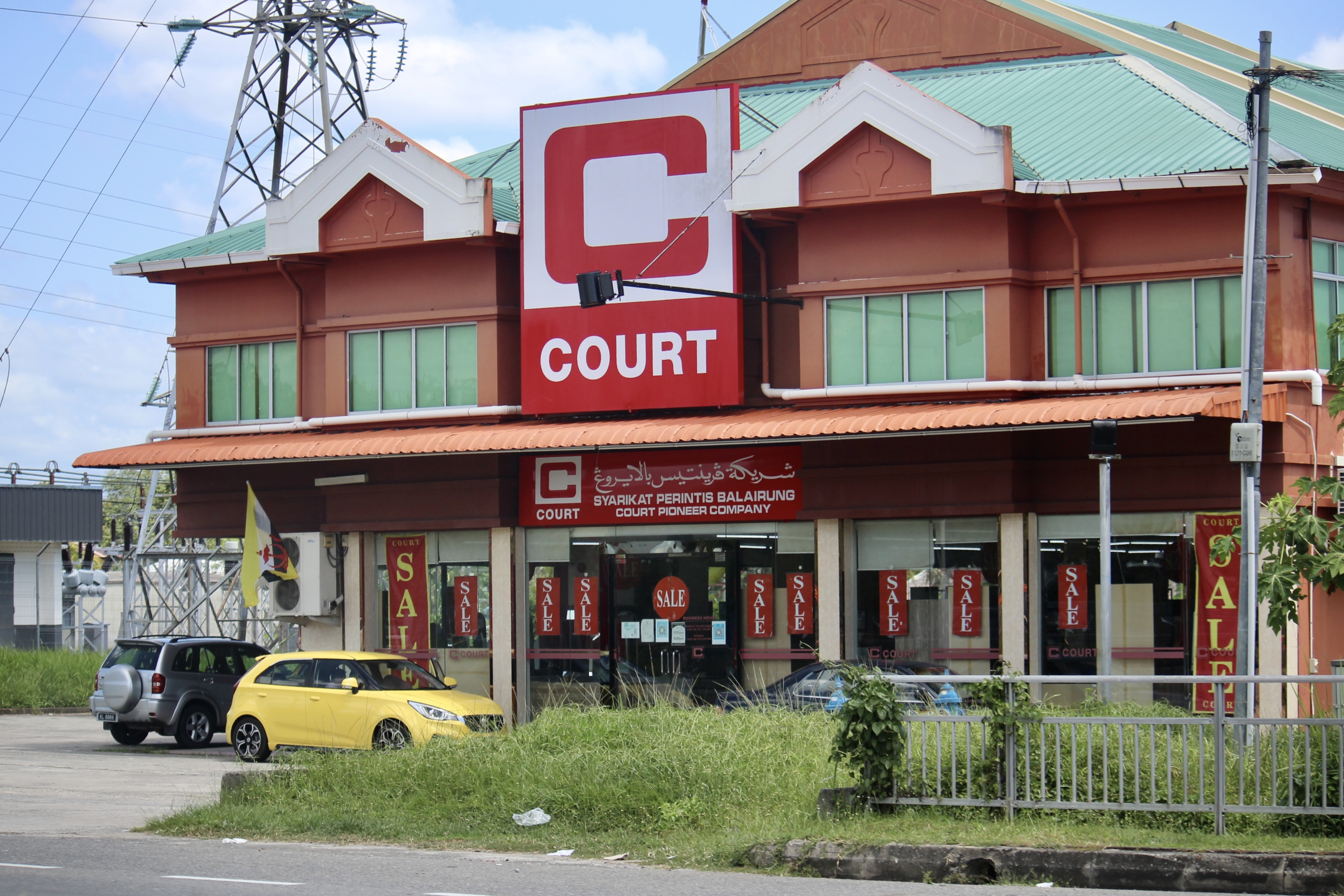
- Kampong Kilanas

- Location in Brunei
- Coordinates: 4°52′12″N 114°51′44″E
- Country: Brunei
- District: Brunei-Muara
- Mukim: Kilanas

Government
  - Village head: Mohammad Ameerolbahrynee

Area
  - Total: 1,093.69 ha (2,702.6 acres)

Population (2016)
  - Total: 4,589
  - Density: 419.6/km^{2} (1,087/sq mi)
- Time zone: UTC+8 (BNT)
- Postcode: BF2520

Kampong Kilanas (Malay: Kampung Kilanas) or commonly known as Kilanas, is a village in Brunei-Muara District, Brunei, on the western outskirts of the capital Bandar Seri Begawan. The population was 4,589 in 2016. It is one of the villages within Mukim Kilanas.

== Infrastructure ==
=== Schools ===
- Orang Kaya Setia Bakti Primary School is the village's primary school, whereas Pengiran Anak Puteri Majeedah Nuurul Bolkiah Religious School is the village's school for the country's Islamic religious primary education.
- Sayyidina Hasan Secondary School, the sole secondary school in Mukim Kilanas, is located within the village boundary.

=== Places of interest ===
Among other things, wasai (small waterfall) found in the village are Wasai Terjun Rendah and Wasai Terjun Tinggi which have a panoramic view located on the hill. In addition to the two, there is another wasai known as Wasai Terjun Mampattan which is also located on the hill but it has not yet been developed. The third waterfall is Wasai Dang Umai Mandi which is also located on a hill that has cold water. Not far from there, there is an area of Tasek Labui which is a little below the hill with a small waterfall. Another wasai that is also located not far is Wasai Terjun Menyusup, this has been found by the residents for a long time.

- Kampong Kilanas Mosque is the village mosque and was opened for use on 29 November 1968. It can accommodate 1,700 worshippers.

== Notable people ==
- Halbi Mohd Yussof (born 1956), a soldier, politician and minister.
