= Kampong Telanai =

Village of Brunei

Telanai
- Village and neighbourhood
- Kampong Telanai
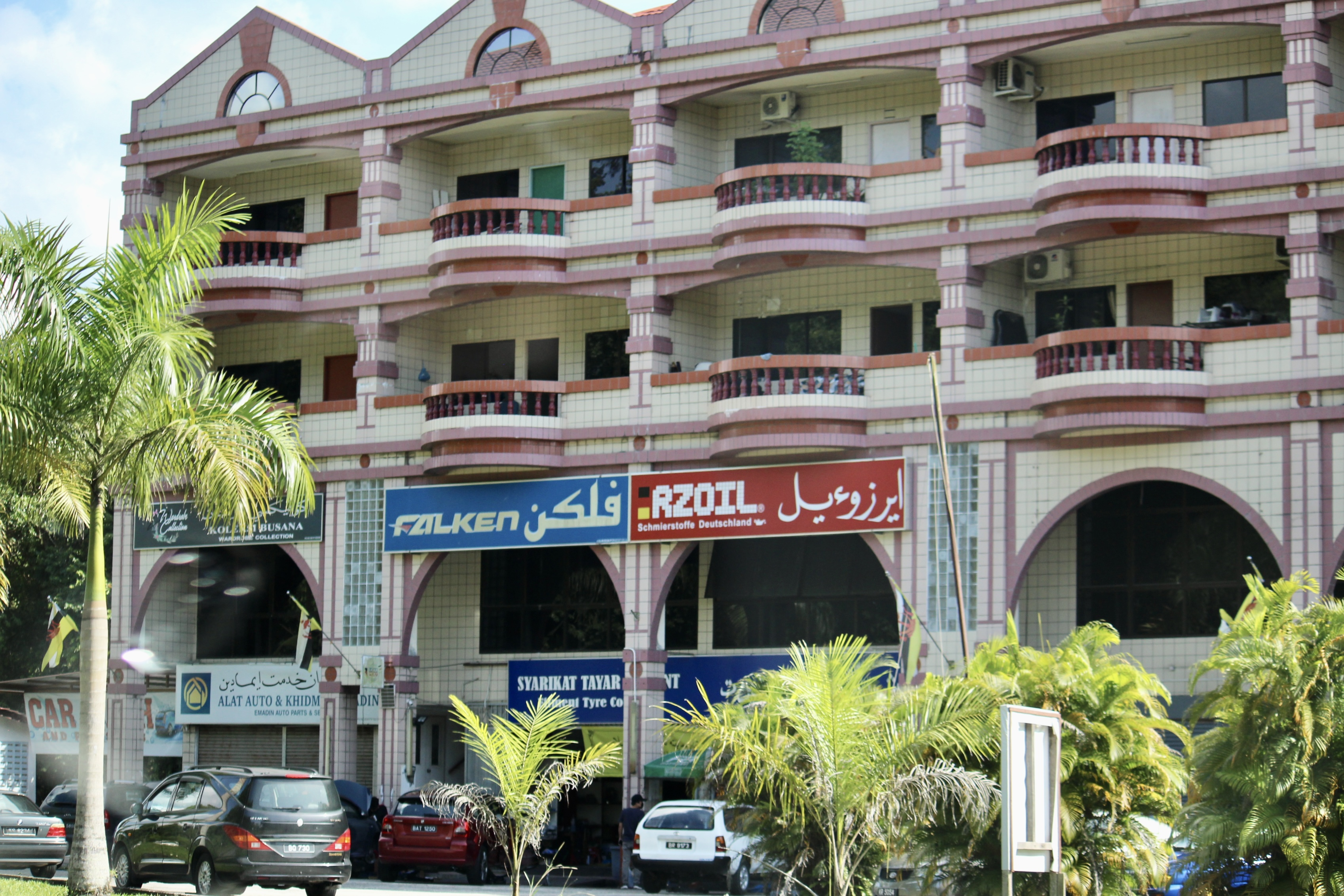

- Location in Brunei
- Coordinates: 4°52′07″N 114°54′05″E
- Country: Brunei
- District: Brunei-Muara
- Mukim: Kilanas

Population (2016)
  - Total: 1,228
- Time zone: UTC+8 (BNT)
- Postcode: BA2312, BF1020

Kampong Telanai is a village in Brunei-Muara District, Brunei, as well as a neighbourhood in the capital Bandar Seri Begawan. The population was 1,228 in 2016. It is one of the villages within Mukim Kilanas. The postcode is BA2312 or BF1020.

== Infrastructure ==
The village is also home to the Embassy of Vietnam.

== Notable people ==
- Abdul Momin Ismail (1927–2008), Menteri Besar of Brunei
- Marsal Maun (1913–2000), Menteri Besar of Brunei
- HRH Princess Nor’ain (Princess of Brunei/ daughter to HRH Al-Marhum Sultan Omar Ali Saifuddin Sa’adul Khairi Waddin)
- Mokhtar Puteh (1929–2016), Cheteria of Brunei
