= Kampong Bunut =

Village in Brunei

Bunut
- Village
- Kampong Bunut
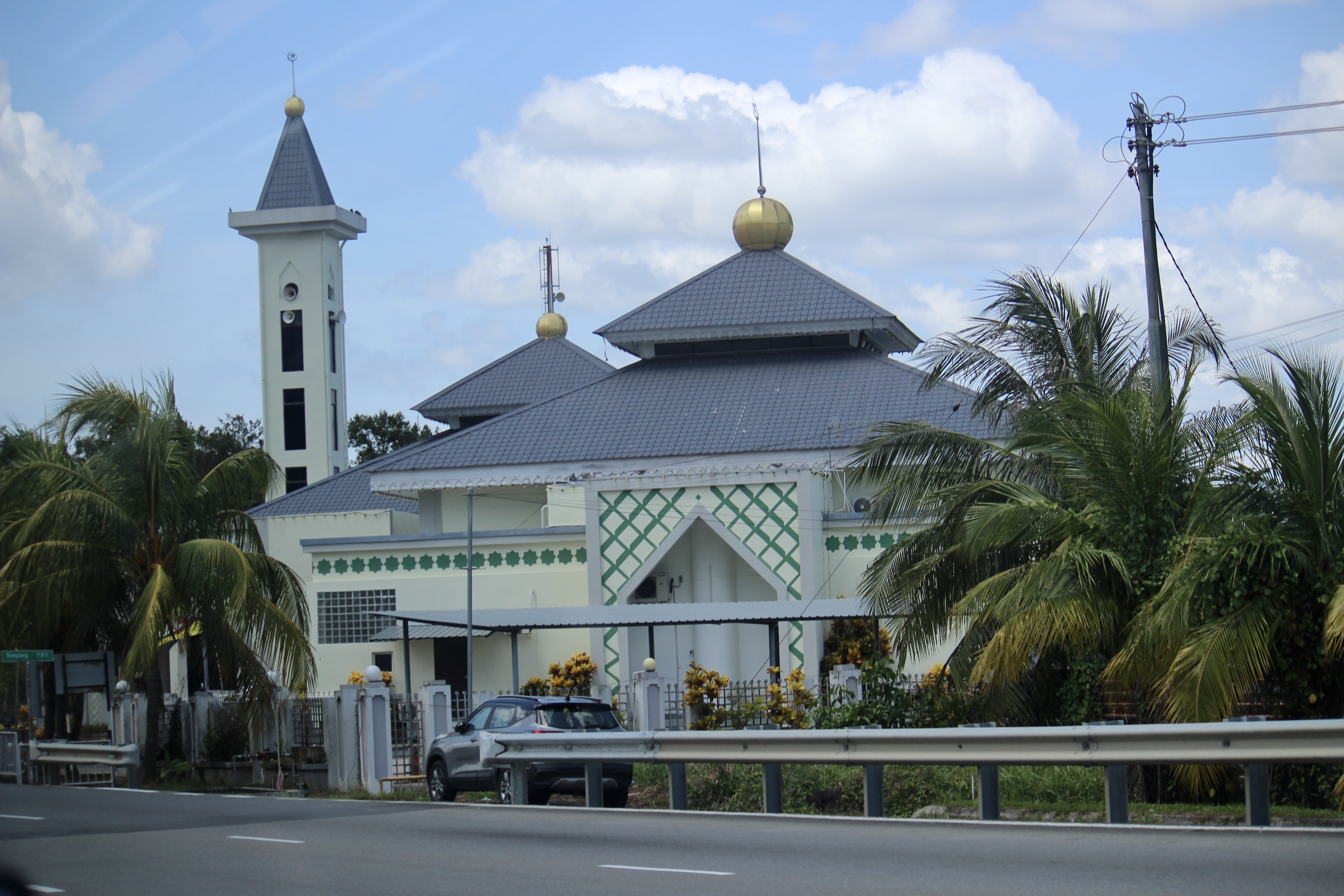
- Kampong Bunut Mosque

- Location in Brunei
- Coordinates: 4°51′08″N 114°52′52″E
- Country: Brunei
- District: Brunei-Muara
- Mukim: Kilanas

Government
  - Village head: Hussaini Mohsin

Population (2016)
  - Total: 1,563
- Time zone: UTC+8 (BNT)
- Postcode: BF1320

Kampong Bunut is a village in Brunei-Muara District, Brunei, within Mukim Kilanas. It is also an area within the country's capital Bandar Seri Begawan. The population was 1,563 in 2016.

== Facilities ==
=== Mosque ===
After beginning construction under the 6th National Development Plan in December 1991 and spending over B$2.5 million, the mosque was completed in October 1992. The Kampong Bunut Mosque, which was funded by the Government of Brunei, was inaugurated by Sultan Hassanal Bolkiah on 16 July 1993. The mosque can accommodate up to 1,000–1,500 pilgrims.

== Notable people ==
- Pengiran Abu Bakar Salleh (1907–1974), legislative speaker

== See also ==
- Bunut Perpindahan
