= Kampong Tanjong Bunut =

Village in Brunei

Tanjong Bunut
- Village
- Kampong Tanjong Bunut کامڤوڠ تنجوڠ بونوت
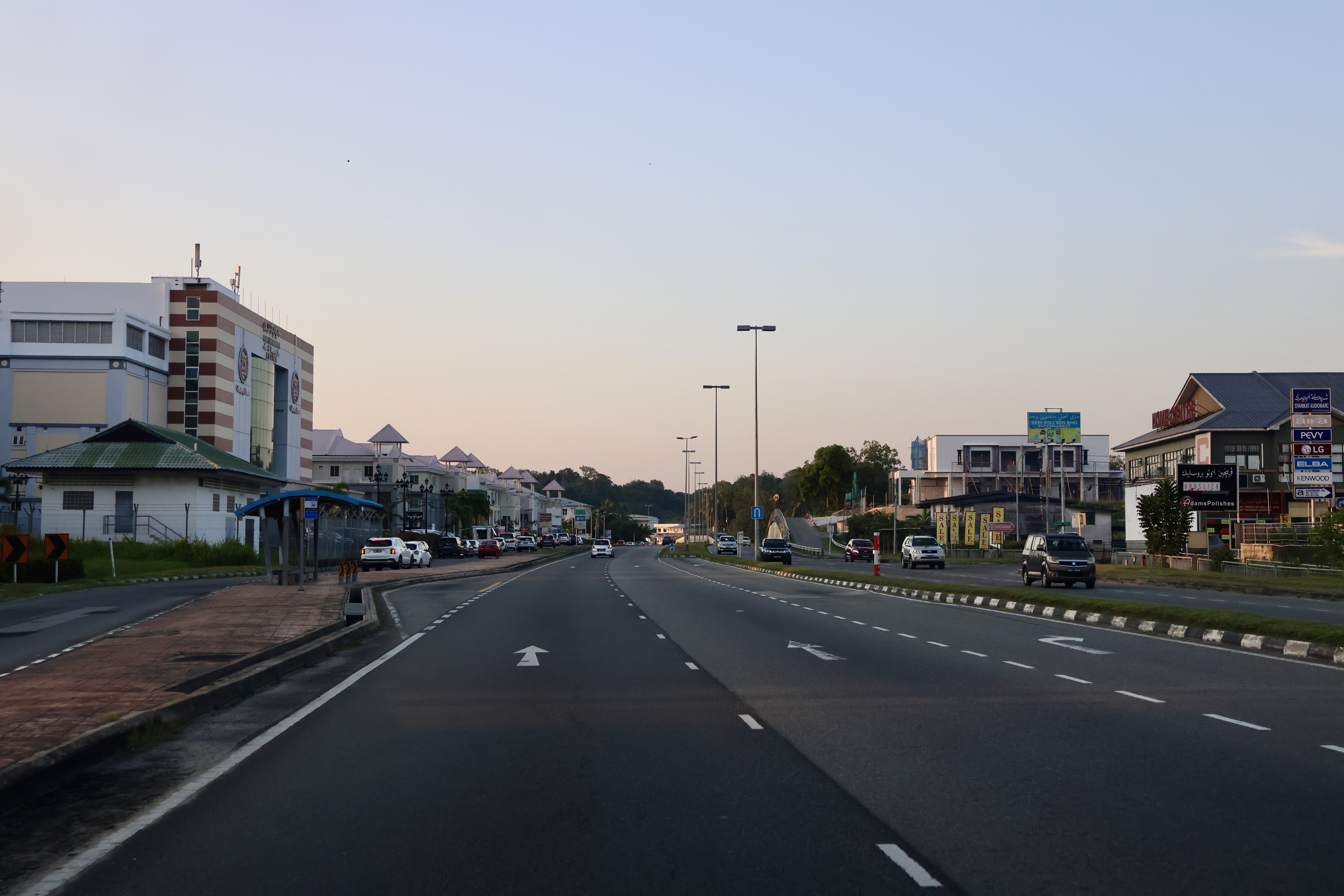
- Jalan Tutong

- Location in Brunei
- Coordinates: 4°53′32″N 114°51′25″E
- Country: Brunei
- District: Brunei-Muara
- Mukim: Kilanas

Government
  - Village head: Awang Haji Abdul Rahman bin Haji Jumat (Acting)

Population (2021)
  - Total: 2,754
- Time zone: UTC+8 (BNT)
- Postcode: BF2920

Kampong Tanjong Bunut (Malay: Kampung Tanjong Bunut) or simply known as Tanjong Bunut, is a village in Brunei-Muara District, Brunei, on the outskirts of the capital Bandar Seri Begawan. The population was 2,754 in 2021. It is one of the villages within Mukim Kilanas. The postcode is BF2920.

== Geography ==
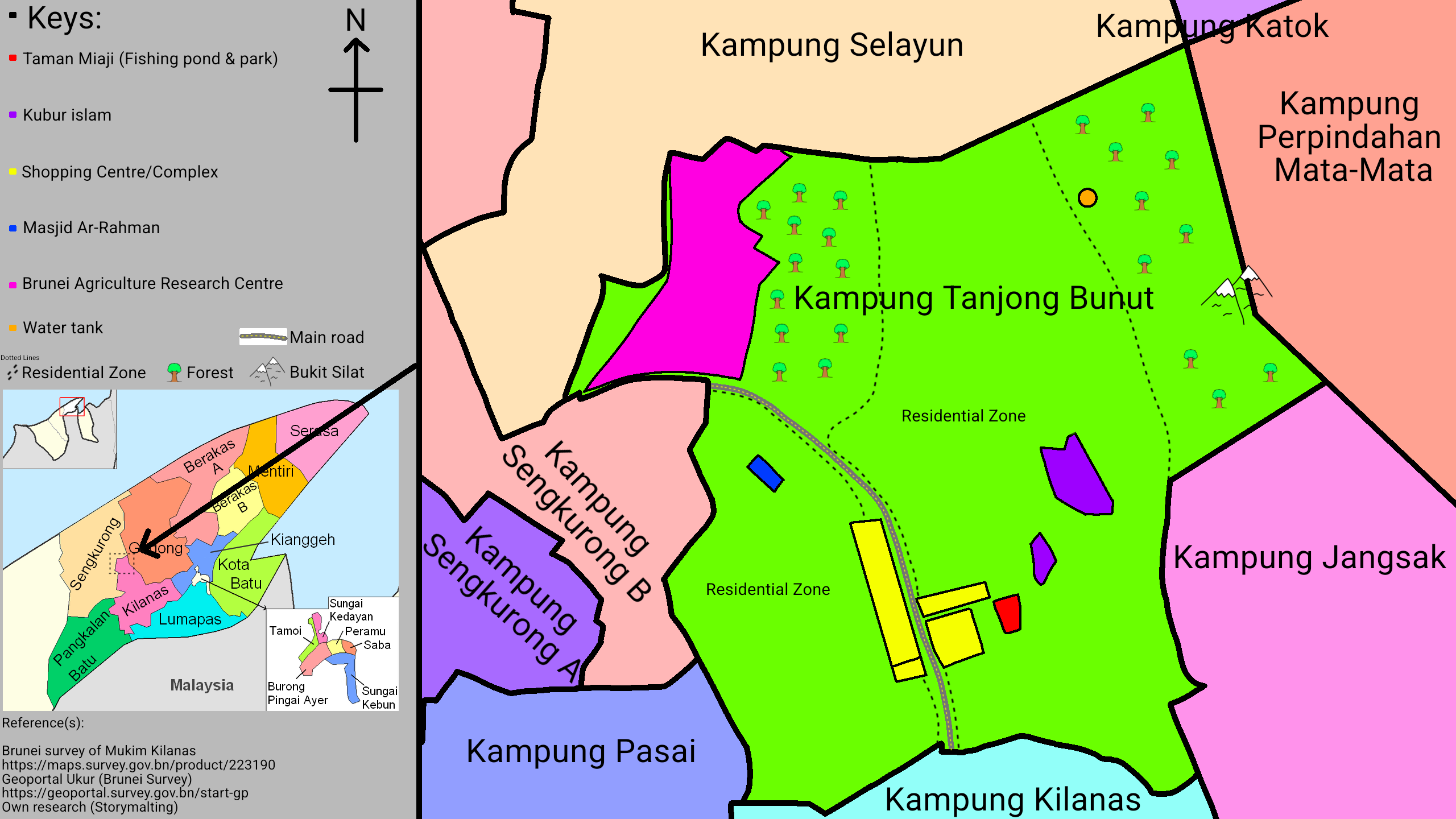
Kampung Tanjong Bunut

Kampong Tanjong Bunut located about 18 kilometers from Bandar Seri Begawan is one of the 11 villages found under Mukim Kilanas.

It has 7 neighboring kampung's:

Under Mukim Kilanas:

- Kampung Kilanas
- Kampung Jangsak

Under Mukim Sengkurong:

- Kampung Selayun
- Kampung Sengkurong B
- kampung Pasai

Under Mukim Gadong A:

- Kampung Katok

Under Mukim Gadong B:

- Kampung (Perpindahan) Mata-Mata

== Events ==
Events & activities conducted in this village is mostly hosted by the Majlis Perundingan Kampung (MPK) of Tanjong Bunut.

List of events (as 2019):

Events	Date	Hosted by	Place	Poster/Image
Majlis Makan Tahun	2 December 2019	PMK	Taman Miaji	
Cabaran Memancing	19 March 2021	PMK	Taman Miaji	
Hiking Silaturahim ke bukit silat	4 March 2022	PMK	Rumah PMK/Bukit Silat	
Aktiviti Silaturahim	25 September 2022	University Brunei Darussalam	Taman Miaji	
Sports Fiesta	26 December 2022	PMK	Rumah PMK	
Aktiviti Sempena Cuti Persekolahan	23 December 2023	PMK	Taman Miaji	
Hiking dan sukan ria kemesraan silaturahim kali ke-3	25 August 2024	PMK	Rumah PMK	

== Infrastructure ==
The village has infrastructure facilities such as roads that connect small roads and various facilities provided by the government such as water, electricity and sewer. It has experienced rapid progress such as the construction of shopping malls, clinics and private schools which also experience busyness when it is time to receive the monthly salary which also affects the busyness of the roads.

=== Places of interest ===
Ar-Rahman Mosque

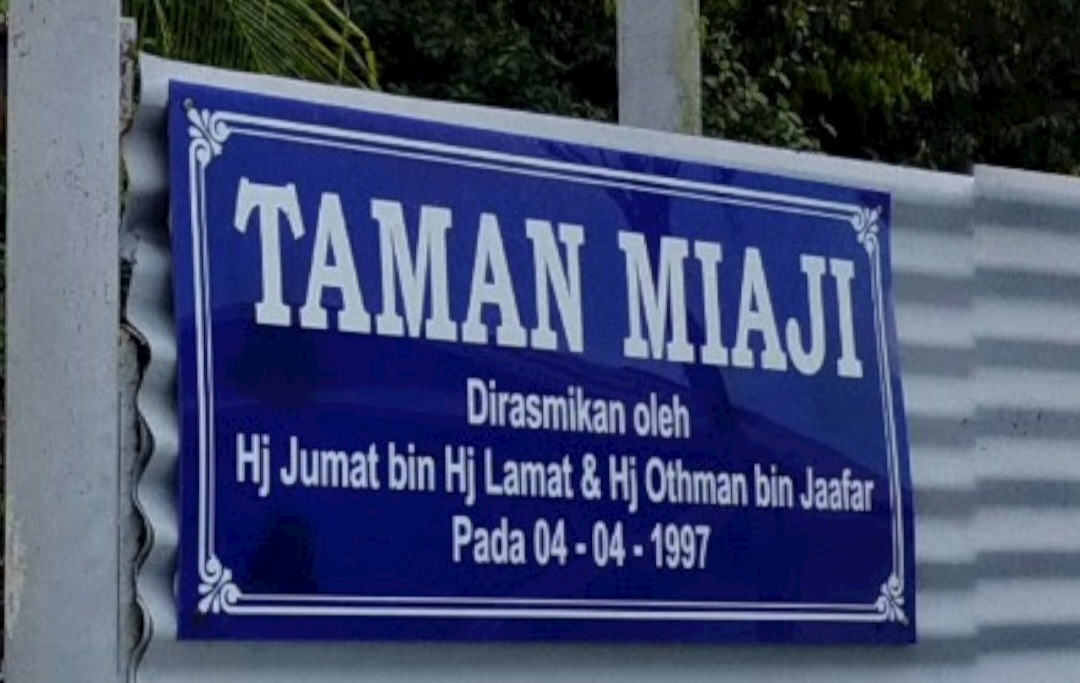
Taman Miaji plaque

- A surau that was built on 21 February 1986 on a 1.27-acre plot of land and was completed on 19 August 1986 with a total expenses of approximately BND$75,649.84, paid by public donations. The surau was officially opened by Abdul Hamid Bakal on 19 April 1987. The capacity of this surau can accommodate a total of 400 pilgrims. Due to the increasing number of residents and congregations, the surau building was enlarged in January 1997 and completed three months later with an expenditure of BND$23,072.75. It has been abolished in late 2017 to build the Ar-Rahman Mosque.
- Ar-Rahman Mosque is the village mosque; it was inaugurated by Sultan Hassanal Bolkiah on 14 September 2018. The 1.48 acres (0.60 ha) mosque was built at a cost of B$3,560,000 and can accommodate 1,260 worshippers.
- Wasai Selangan Kaca is a wasai (small waterfall) which has yet to be explored and developed.
- Taman Miaji is a fishing pond located behind the Home Centre Complex; a small park for activities. It has 9 designated fishing ponds with abundant fresh water fish species and also a hiking trail. It was inaugurated by Haji Jumat bin Haji Lamat and Haji Othman bin Jaafar on 4 April 1997.

== See also ==
- Mukim Kilanas
- List of villages in Brunei
- Kampong
