= Kampong Kiudang =

Village in Brunei

Kiudang
- Village
- Kampong Kiudang
- Location in Brunei
- Coordinates: 4°44′24″N 114°44′10″E
- Country: Brunei
- District: Tutong
- Mukim: Kiudang
- First settled: 19th century

Government
  - Village head: Rifaie Abdul Rahim

Area
  - Total: 2,688.02 ha (6,642.2 acres)

Population (2016)
  - Total: 1,258
  - Density: 46.80/km^{2} (121.2/sq mi)
- Time zone: UTC+8 (BNT)
- Postcode: TE1543

Kampong Kiudang (Malay: Kampung Kiudang) or simply known as Kiudang, is a village in Tutong District, Brunei, about 24 kilometres (15 mi) from the district town Pekan Tutong. The population was 1,258 in 2016.

== Etymology ==
The origin of the name Kampong Kiudang is derived from the name of the tree 'Kayudang' according to the nickname of the Dusun community in ancient times. While the name 'Mungkom' is a Bong Mungkom language which means a type of durian fruit.

== Administration ==
The village is one of the subdivisions within Mukim Kiudang, a mukim in the district. Its village head (ketua kampung) also oversees the neighbouring village Kampong Mungkom.

== Demography ==
As of 2017, the village has a population of 1,197 people made up of various layers of race, tribe and society, with majority being Malay and Muslim.

== Economy ==
Majlis Perundingan Kampung (MPK) Kiudang created a tourism industry capable of generating the economy and prosperity of the community, tried to preserve this sector starting in 2011 through eco-tourism service products One Village One Product (1K1P) by highlighting the Taman Rekreasi Wasai Bedanu (Bedanu Waterfall Recreational Park) as the main visit to Kampong Kiudang. The Bedanu Waterfall Recreational Park transformation plan that was prepared said the MPK has succeeded in attracting many visitors by providing tour activities such as jungle tracking to caves, Sapok Waterdall and Batu Ampar visit herbal gardens and so on.

Seeing how important the tourism industry is to the progress of the village and to support the desire of the Sultan of Brunei towards a developed country in Vision 2035, efforts to strengthen the management and services of this industry continue by establishing cooperation which is cohesive with interested parties such as the Tourism Development Department of the Ministry of Primary Resources and Tourism, signed an MoU agreement with the Tutong District Tourism Coordination and Promotion Agency, established business cooperation with local tourism agents especially in helping and providing support in all aspects.

== Infrastructure ==
The village has well-equipped infrastructure such as roads, public facilities, schools and shops.

=== Education ===
Kiudang Primary School is the village primary school; it was opened in 1938. It also shares grounds with Kiudang Religious School, the village school for the country's Islamic religious primary education.

=== Places of interest ===
Pengiran Muda 'Abdul Wakeel Mosque (also known as Kampong Kiudang Mosque) is the village mosque; the current building was opened in December 2010 and can accommodate about 1,200 worshippers. The mosque's older building accommodated 300 worshippers and had been inaugurated on 26 December 1972.

== Achievement ==
The village has received a few awards and recognition, both on national and regional levels. In 2013, it won a bronze medal in the Excellent Village Award (Anugerah Kampung Cemerlang), an annual national award which recognises villages with outstanding community-led socioeconomic activities. In 2015, the village was designated as a community-based Eco-tourism Village by BIMP-EAGA, a sub-ASEAN economic cooperation initiative. In 2017, the village was a recipient of the ASEAN Community-based Tourism Award for its achievement in attracting visitors, both local and foreign, to the village.
