= Village head =

Community leader of a village

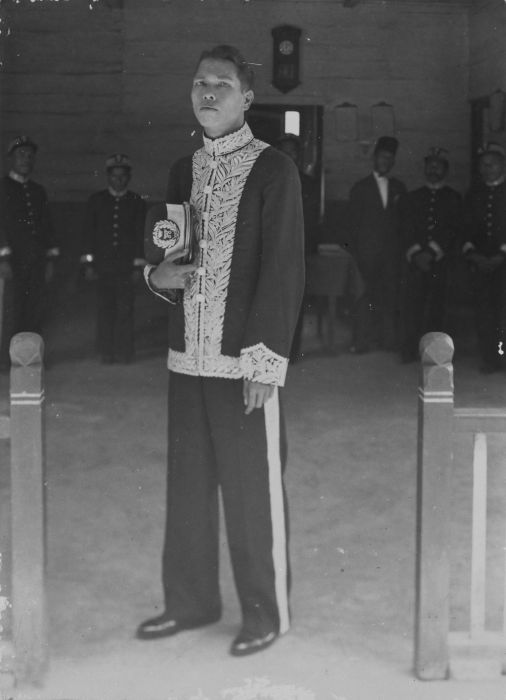
The village head of Kabanjahe in the Dutch East Indies in the 1930s

A village head, village headman or village chief is the leader of a village, hamlet, or other type of settlement too small to have their own mayor.

Unlike the position of mayor, denoting a leader of a city, town or other large settlements with its own incorporated government, the title of village head may be purely ceremonial or even entirely unofficial, simply denoting an individual which commands sizeable political and social influence in a given area. This is especially the case in the modern era, as increased urbanization and advances in communication mean that most villages are subject to some form of local government already, and thus the need for local chiefs has decreased. However, in some countries, village heads continue to exist as an official government position analogous to that of a mayor, or at the very least as a consultative or representative role that mediates between small communities and higher levels of government.

== Usage ==
=== Brunei ===
In Brunei, village head is called ketua kampung or ketua kampong in the Malay language. It is an administrative post which leads the community of a village administrative division, the third and lowest subdivision of the country.

=== China ===
In China, village head (simplified Chinese: 村长; traditional Chinese: 村長; pinyin: cūn zhǎng) is a local government or tribal post. The village headman is the person appointed to administer an area that is often a single village.

==== Duties and functions ====
The headman has several official duties in the village, and is sometimes seen as a mediator in disputes and a general "fixer" of village or individuals problems.

Examples of headmanship have been observed among the Zuni, !Kung, and Mehinacu, among others. Nearby tribal leaders recognized or appointed by the Chinese were known as tusi (tu-szu; Chinese: 土司; pinyin: tǔsī; Wade–Giles: t'u^{3}-szu^{1}), although they could command larger areas than a single village.

=== Indonesia ===
The village head in Indonesia is called Kepala Desa.

=== Malaysia ===
Generally in Malaysia, the village head is called Ketua Kampung, except for the proto Malay village where the position is called Batin. Ketua Kampung was appointed and assisted by Majlis Pengurusan Komuniti Kampung (Village Community Management Board). In Sarawak, the head of a traditional long house is called Tuai Rumah.

=== Philippines ===
Each barangay (village) in the Philippines is led by a barangay captain.

== Historical usage ==
=== China ===
In the Qing and early Republican era, dibao were officially appointed village officials, usually selected from the local landowning class and responsible for land use and boundaries in their jurisdiction.

=== Japan ===
In Edo period Japan, the village head was called nanushi (名主) and was in charge of tax collection, general village administration, management of public natural resources (such as mountain, field, river and ocean) of the village, as well as negotiating with the territorial lord as the representative of the villagers.

== See also ==
- Mayor
- Opperhoofd
- Tribal chief
