= Kampong Kuala Tutong =

Village in Tutong District

Kampong Kuala Tutong Kampung Kuala Tutong
- Village
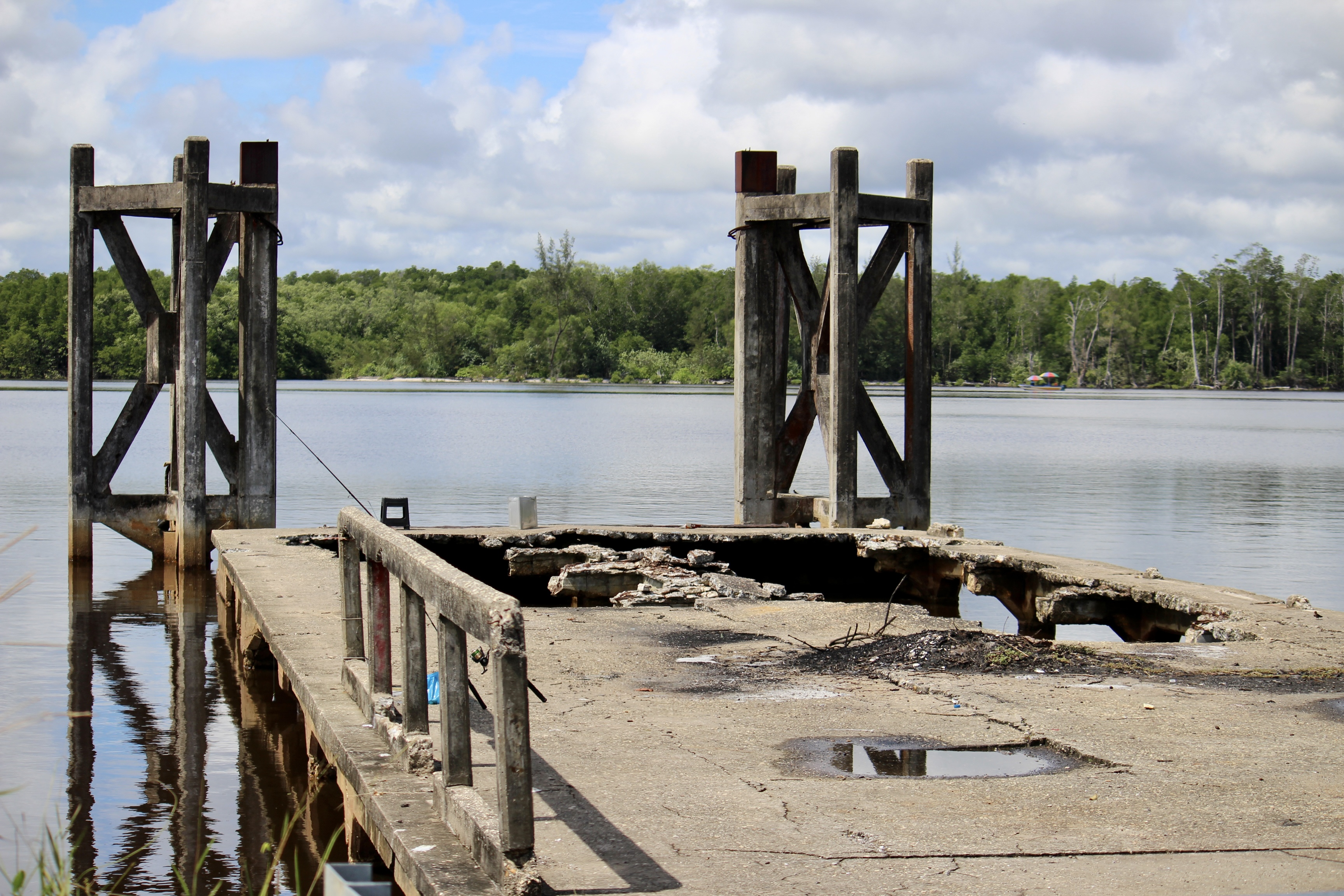
- The former ferry jetty

- Location in Brunei
- Coordinates: 4°46′53″N 114°36′30″E
- Country: Brunei
- District: Tutong
- Mukim: Pekan Tutong
- First settled: 19th century

Government
  - Village head: Sofiyuddin Serudin

Area
  - Total: 1.3 km^{2} (0.50 sq mi)
- Postcode: TA3341

Kampong Kuala Tutong (Malay: Kampung Kuala Tutong), also simply known as Kuala Tutong, is a village in Tutong District, Brunei, within the mukim of Pekan Tutong. The postcode for Kampong Kuala Tutong is TA3341. Kampong Kuala Tutong covers 1.3 square kilometres (0.50 sq mi) from the mosque to the river's mouth. Before World War II, a ferry jetty was constructed at the end of Jalan Kuala Tutong, approximately 5 kilometres (3.1 mi) from Kampong Penabai. Since no bridges connected the Tutong and Belait Districts at that time, the Brunei government introduced a ferry service in 1930, which operated from Kuala Sungai Tutong. This ferry became a crucial transportation link for vehicles traveling between Bandar Seri Begawan, Tutong, Seria, and Kuala Belait. However, the service ceased in 1958 following the completion of bridges in Serambangun and Telamba, which made the ferry redundant.

== Etymology ==
The name "Kuala Tutong" is derived from the Malay words kuala, meaning "river mouth" or "confluence," and Tutong, referring to the Tutong River and the district it traverses. This reflects the town's location at the mouth of the Tutong River, where it meets the South China Sea. Like other kuala settlements, its strategic position was likely chosen for defensive purposes and to facilitate trade and transportation along the river and nearby coastal areas.

== Geography ==
Kuala Tutong is surrounded by two bodies of water both in the North, the South China Sea and South, the Tutong River. It has coconut palms, a spit and a 5 kilometres (3.1 mi) beach named Seri Kenangan Beach. At Kuala Tutong and Kuala Belait, there are a few small mangrove areas, but they are only adequate for storing local supplies.

== History ==
The migration of Brunei Malays to the Kuala Tutong area is closely tied to the economic conditions of Brunei in the late 19th and early 20th centuries, particularly affecting those living in Kampong Ayer, who struggled to sustain their livelihoods. As the coal mining industry flourished in Muara, many Kampong Ayer residents relocated there. However, as the industry declined, some Bruneians shifted their focus to Tutong District, marking the beginning of their migration to Kampong Kuala Tutong, which later became part of Kampong Penabai.

Among the first to settle in Kuala Tutong was Gunong bin Sulaiman around 1910. A trader originally from Kampong Ayer who had lived in Muara, he was drawn to the area by its strategic location as a trading hub. He was soon joined by five siblings from Kampong Saba, who also sought better opportunities. Over time, the settlement grew as more Brunei Malays established their homes there. The primary occupations of the villagers were fishing and farming, with their catches sold to Chinese traders who dominated commerce in the region.

Kampong Kuala Tutong became a crucial point for the district when the Kuala Sungai Tutong emerged as the primary link between Tutong and Belait. In 1931, the British Malayan Petroleum Company took responsibility for maintaining the bridges and coastal road from Kuala Tutong to Kuala Belait, as the route fell within their operational area. During World War II, the region became a battleground when the Australian Army's 20th Brigade and 2/8th Field Regiment fought against Japanese forces during the liberation of Brunei in August 1945. The area also housed a Japanese cemetery, marking the period of Japanese occupation. To maintain traffic flow between Brunei and Kuala Belait during the war, a pontoon car-ferry service was established at Kuala Tutong, with the 2/3rd Field Regiment managing ferry operations using a raft.

Before the introduction of the ferry service, those wishing to cross to Kampong Danau or vice versa had to rely on private boats, with eight boats charging a fare of 25 cents per person. In 1929, the transportation service was significantly improved with the introduction of the bantun, a large vessel formed by joining two boats, capable of carrying up to four vehicles and powered by a modified car engine. This service, featuring boats named Higgins, Pemancha, and Semaun, charged a B$5.00 fare per vehicle and was predominantly used by employees of the British Malayan Petroleum Company. By 1945, the bantun was replaced by a dedicated ferry with its own engine.

The government also prioritised improving road infrastructure in the region, with the construction of a coastal road between 1932 and 1933. This road, extending from Seri Kenangan Beach to Kuala Sungai Tutong, became the main route for those travelling between the Brunei and Tutong districts to Belait. Although frequently disrupted by high tides, it remained an essential link. Recognising its importance, a more reliable road leading to the Kuala Tutong jetty was completed between 1945 and 1946.

== Economy ==
Perusahaan Seri Melati was the first company in Brunei to manufacture fiberglass boats. Established in 1977 by Haji Mahmud bin Awang Damit, the company not only produces and repairs boats but also creates various fiberglass products. At the time of its founding, fiberglass boats in Brunei were imported from Sabah and Sarawak, which motivated Haji Mahmud to start his own business. He learned the craft from his relative, Peter Abu Bakar, who ran a fiberglass business in Kota Kinabalu. After gaining knowledge and experience, he launched Perusahaan Seri Melati, named after his boat. Initially, the business operated from his home, producing boats for fishermen. With guidance from Peter Abu Bakar, the company quickly grew and gained recognition, receiving many orders. In 1979, the government granted him a piece of land and financial assistance to expand the business. Since then, Perusahaan Seri Melati has become well-known throughout Tutong and Brunei.

== Infrastructure ==
=== Ferry jetty ===
The ferry jetty at Kuala Sungai Tutong was built after the government introduced the ferry service in 1930, becoming a key facility for both government and civilian use. During the Japanese occupation of Brunei (1941–1945), the jetty played a crucial role in allowing Australian troops access to the Seria oil fields, but it was damaged during the war and became unsafe. In 1949, it was reconstructed with iron, concrete, wooden beams, and a reinforced deck for improved durability. The ferry service itself initially operated with two modified boats, transporting two cars at a time across the Tutong River. The engine-powered ferry took about 30 minutes to reach the Danau ferry dock and over an hour and a half to return to Kuala Tutong. After crossing to Danau, vehicles heading to Seria and Kuala Belait had to take a 25 miles (40 km) coastal route that was only accessible during favorable weather and tide conditions.

At that time, the Brunei government imposed a fee of $5.00 for each civilian vehicle using the Kuala Sungai Tutong ferry service. The daily revenue from the ferry service was collected by Customs Officers based in Tutong Town, approximately 7 miles (11 km) from the ferry jetty. In 1957, the government earned B$96,790.00 from this service. That year, a total of 17,855 buses and trucks, 7,840 Land Rovers and jeeps, and 751 motorcycles were recorded using the Kuala Sungai Tutong Ferry.

By 1954, the old ferry jetty was replaced with a new platform to accommodate the V. F. Hinggins ferry, a modern vessel capable of carrying six cars or up to 20 tonnes (20 long tons; 22 short tons) of cargo. As demand for the service grew, the larger V. F. Pemancha ferry began operating in mid-1956 to handle the increased traffic. Both government officials and Brunei Shell workers benefited from the improved ferry services, which facilitated easier vehicle crossings over the Tutong River. For a small fee, civilians could also use the public ferries or private boats, while government-operated ferries like the M. B. Awang Semaun and R. C. L. Fairmile helped meet the rising demand. However, in 1958, the jetty ceased to be the main crossing point to Kuala Belait, as the government completed bridges over the Tutong and Telamba rivers, connecting Tutong Town to Telisai, a distance of approximately 9.5 miles (15.3 km). With the construction of these bridges, the ferry service at Kuala Sungai Tutong was discontinued.

=== Education ===
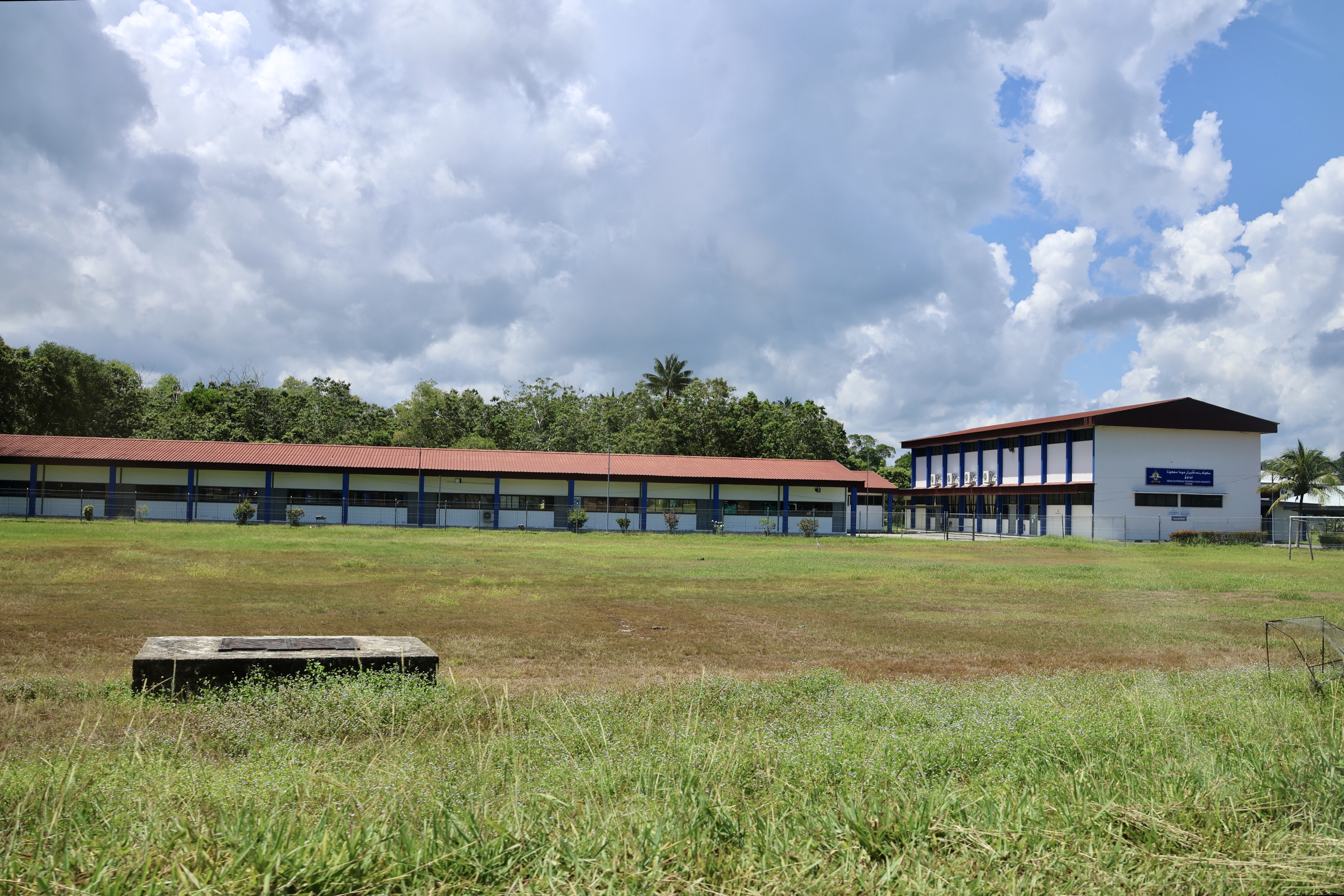
Pengiran Muda Mahkota Primary School

In terms of educational development, the village has its own school. In 1961, the residents of Kampong Penabai and Kampong Kuala Tutong collaborated to build a school building located in Kampong Kuala Tutong. The school was named Pengiran Muda Mahkota Primary School and was officially opened by Sultan Omar Ali Saifuddien III on 14 October 1962. The school's name was chosen in honour of then-Crown Prince (Pengiran Muda Mahkota) Hassanal Bolkiah. Prior to 1961, the villagers sent their children to study at Danau Malay School.

=== Religion ===
In 1981, a surau was built on government land, founded by Haji Mohd. Yusof bin Donglah and Haji Yusof bin Badar. The construction of the surau was carried out through a gotong-royong effort by the villagers. As the number of congregants increased, a mosque was built in 1988 near the existing surau, funded by donations from the villagers and the government. This mosque could accommodate up to 70 congregants. On 21 May 1993, a new mosque was built on a 0.60 acres (0.24 ha) plot of land, located about 5 kilometres (3.1 mi) from Tutong town, and its construction was completed on 4 November 1993. The cost of building this mosque was B$225,000.00, and it can accommodate up to 200 congregants at a time. The first imam appointed for Kampong Penabai Mosque in 1981 was Ustaz Ismail bin Arif. Before the establishment of these surau and mosques, the residents of Kampong Penabai and Kampong Kuala Tutong would perform Friday prayers at Kampong Danau Mosque. After the road connection between Kampong Penabai and Pekan Tutong was established, most villagers began performing Friday prayers at Hassanal Bolkiah Mosque.

=== Miscellaneous ===
Kubur Haji Nayan, located near the Kuala River, is a grave marked with river stones forming a mound approximately 10 feet long, 3 feet wide, and 1 foot high. Haji Nayan, believed to be a pious and revered Muslim convert from the Dusun ethnic group, originally resided in Kampong Tanjong Maya. Without family in Kampong Penabai, he often travelled via the Tutong River to fish and collect mangrove wood. He died during one of these trips, and due to the long journey back to Tanjong Maya, his burial took place in Kuala Tutong. Locals regard his grave as sacred, noting it has never been submerged by the river, even during high tides. In the 1970s, a Chinese villager named Muncun reportedly survived a shipwreck by vowing to build a shelter at Haji Nayan's grave if he was saved, which he later fulfilled. This grave, surrounded by stories of miraculous events, remains a site of local reverence and tradition.

== Gallery ==
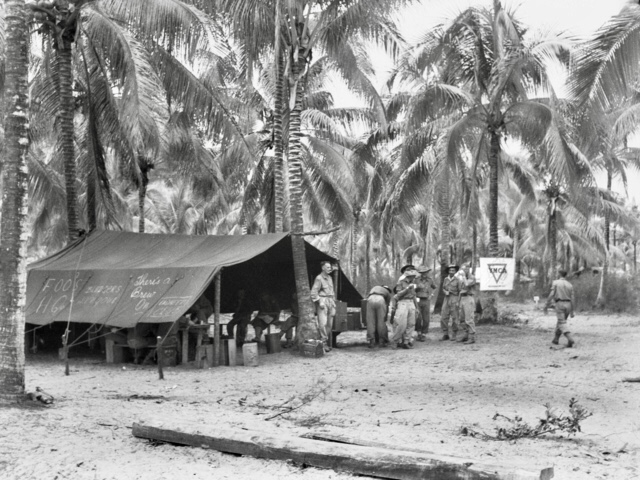
A tea-room and recreation hut managed by the 2/8th Field Regiment.

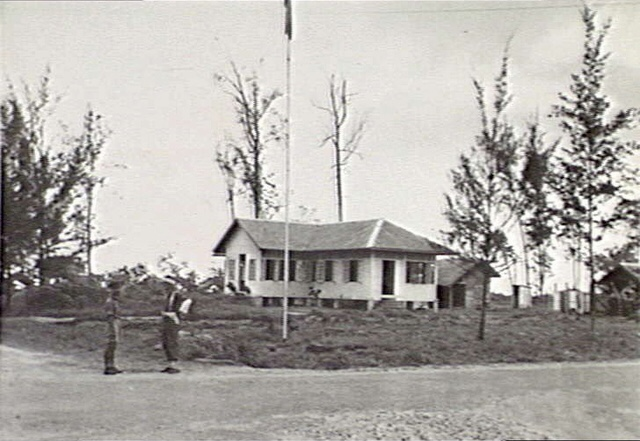
A native boy on police duty in the 20th Infantry Brigade area.

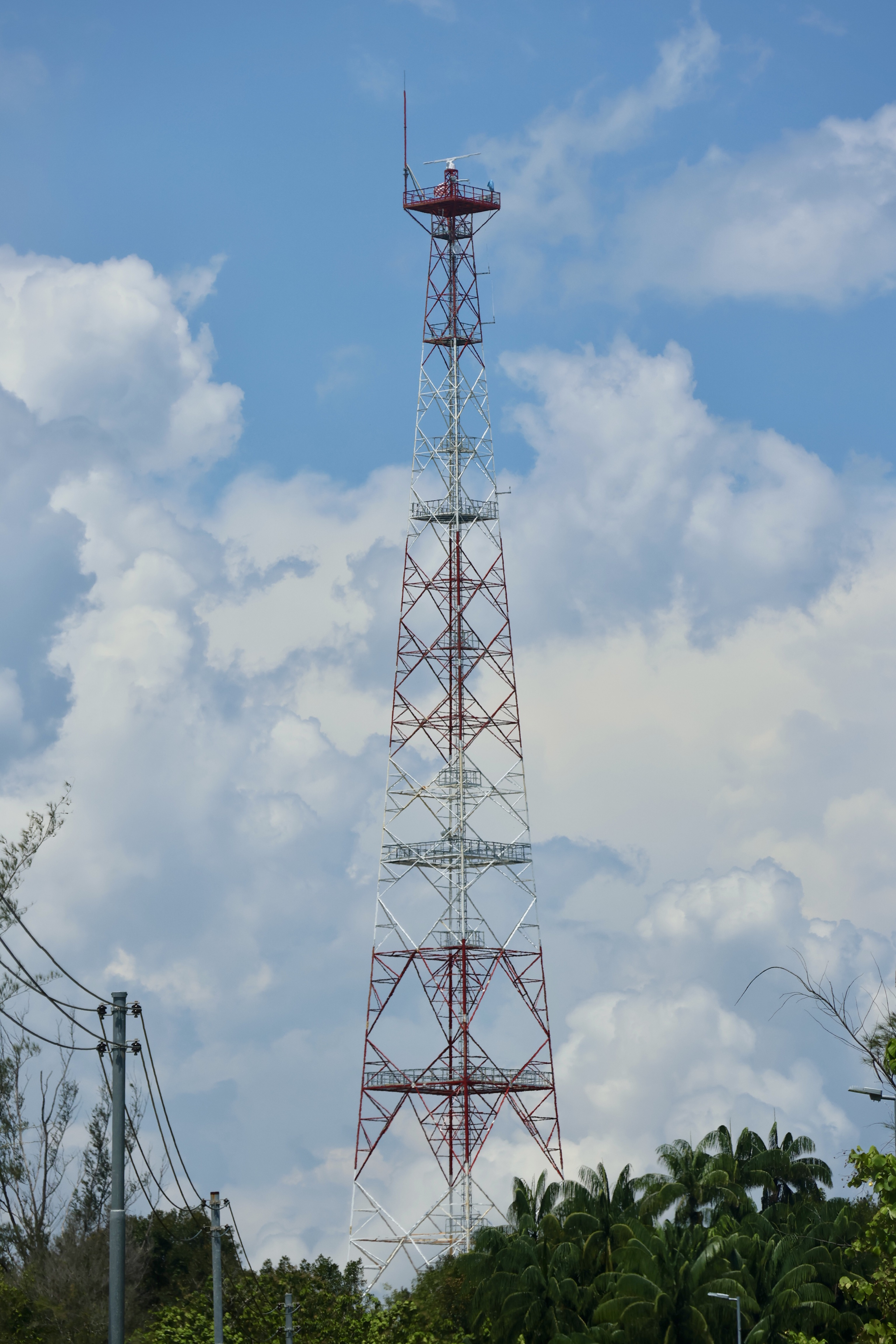
Coastal Surveillance System

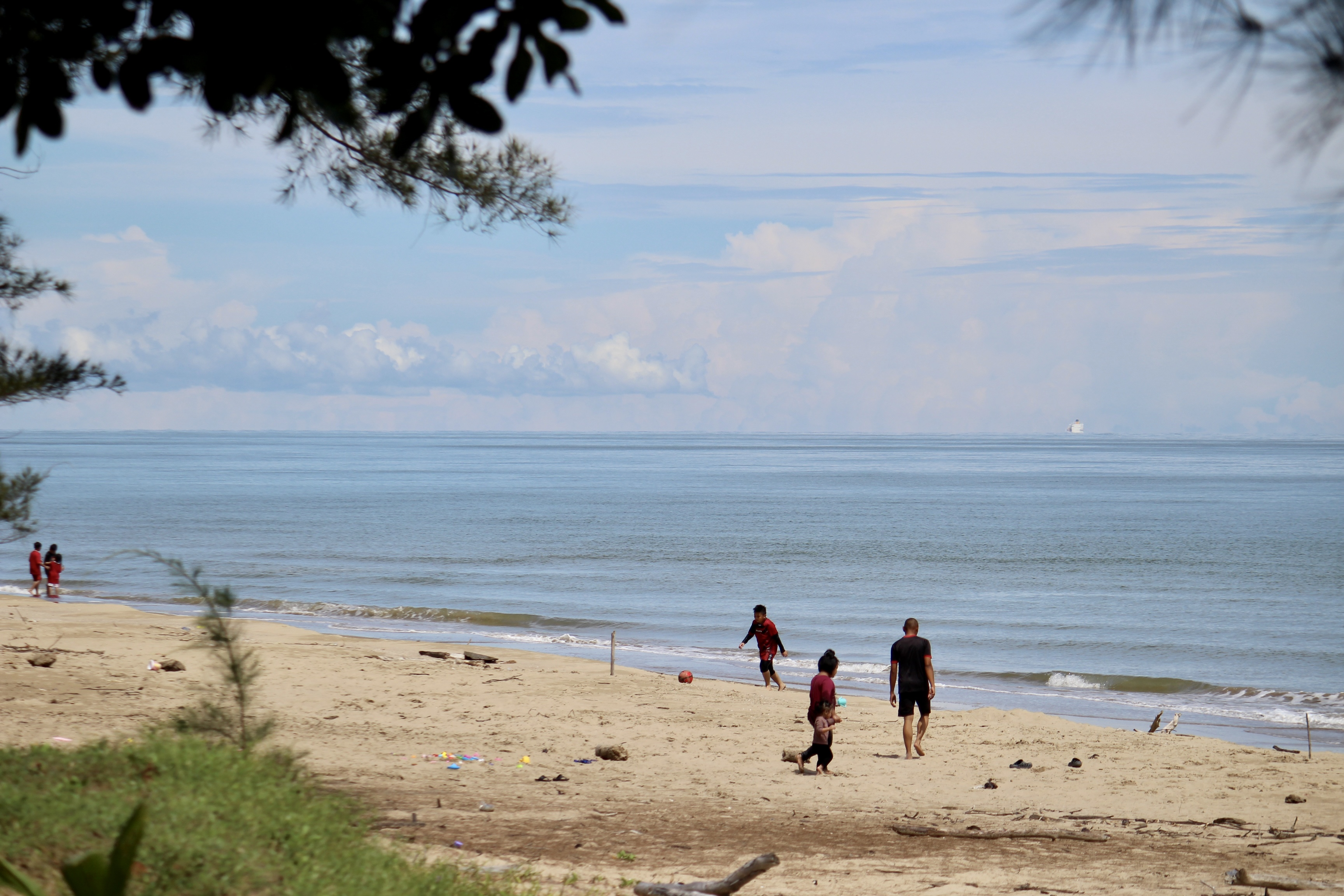
Seri Kenangan Beach
