= Kampong Penabai =

Village in Brunei

Kampong Penabai Kampung Penabai
- Village
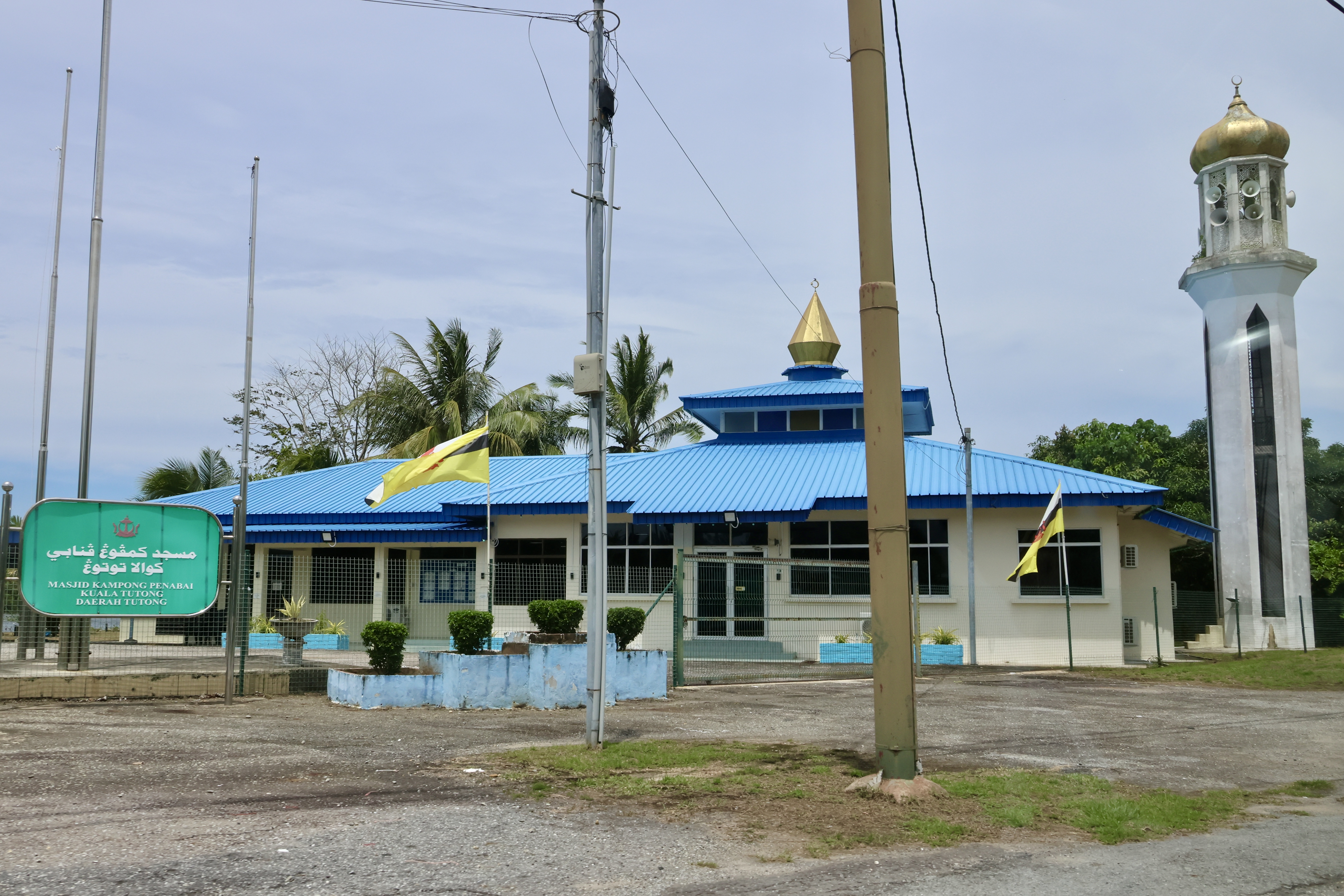
- Kampong Penabai Mosque

- Location in Brunei
- Coordinates: 4°47′45″N 114°37′33″E
- Country: Brunei
- District: Tutong
- Mukim: Pekan Tutong
- First settled: 20th century

Government
  - Village head: Sofiyuddin Serudin

Area
  - Total: 1.5 km^{2} (0.58 sq mi)

Population (2021)
  - Total: 749
  - Density: 500/km^{2} (1,300/sq mi)
- Time zone: UTC+8 (BNT)
- Postcode: TA3541

Kampong Penabai (Malay: Kampung Penabai) is a coastal village located in the Tutong District of Brunei, within the mukim of Pekan Tutong. The village's postcode is TA3541. Located approximately 4–5 kilometres (2.5–3.1 mi) from the district town of Tutong, the village had a population of 749 in 2021. It originated in the early 20th century as a Brunei Malay settlement, previously known as Kampong Kuala Tutong, which spanned from Seri Kenangan Beach to the mouth of the Tutong River. Kampong Penabai covers 1.5 square kilometres (0.58 sq mi) from Seri Kenangan Beach to Kampong Penabai Mosque.

== Etymology ==
The name Kampong Penabai is derived from the Tutong word Abai, or Bunu Abai, which means "Brunei people," referring to the Brunei Malays who settled in the village. These settlers were primarily descendants of the Kampong Ayer community in Brunei District, present-day Brunei–Muara District, who migrated to the area.

== History ==
The migration of the Brunei Malays to this area is closely linked to Brunei's economic conditions in the late 19th to early 20th centuries, particularly affecting those living in Kampong Ayer, who faced significant challenges in sustaining their livelihoods. Many Kampong Ayer residents relocated to various parts of the country, such as Muara, when a coal mining industry developed there. However, as the coal industry declined, some Bruneians shifted their focus to Tutong District, marking the beginning of their migration to Kampong Kuala Tutong, which parts of it eventually became known as Kampong Penabai.

Gunong bin Sulaiman was among the first settlers of Kampong Penabai around 1910. He was a trader originally from Kampong Ayer who had lived in Muara before moving to Tutong District. The strategic location of Kampong Kuala Tutong as a trading hub at the time encouraged him to settle there permanently. Additionally, five siblings from Kampong Saba, also moved to the area in search of livelihood opportunities. Over time, the settlement grew into a village as more Brunei Malays established their homes there. The primary occupation of the villagers was fishing, supplemented by farming. Their catches were sold to Chinese traders who dominated commerce in Tutong District during that period.

Kampong Penabai gained significant importance for the district when the Kuala Sungai Tutong became the primary connection between Tutong and Belait. Before the ferry service was introduced at Kampong Kuala Tutong, those wishing to cross to Kampong Danau or vice versa had to rely on private or hired boats, with eight boats charging a fee of 25 cents per person. The transportation services were improved in 1929 with the introduction of the bantun, a large transportation vessel made by joining two boats, which could carry up to four vehicles (trucks and buses) and was powered by a modified car engine. The bantun service, with boats named Higgins, Pemancha, and Semaun, charged a fare of B$5.00 per vehicle. This service was predominantly used by employees of British Malayan Petroleum Company. By 1945, the bantun service was replaced with a dedicated ferry that used its own engine.

The development of road infrastructure in Kampong Penabai and Kuala Tutong was also prioritised by the government, with the construction of a coastal road between 1932 and 1933. This road, which ran from Seri Kenangan Beach to Kuala Sungai Tutong, was the main route for people from the Brunei and Tutong districts travelling to Belait, despite being often disrupted by high tides. Recognising the importance of this route, a more reliable road to the Kuala Tutong jetty was built between 1945 and 1946.

== Infrastructure ==
=== Education ===
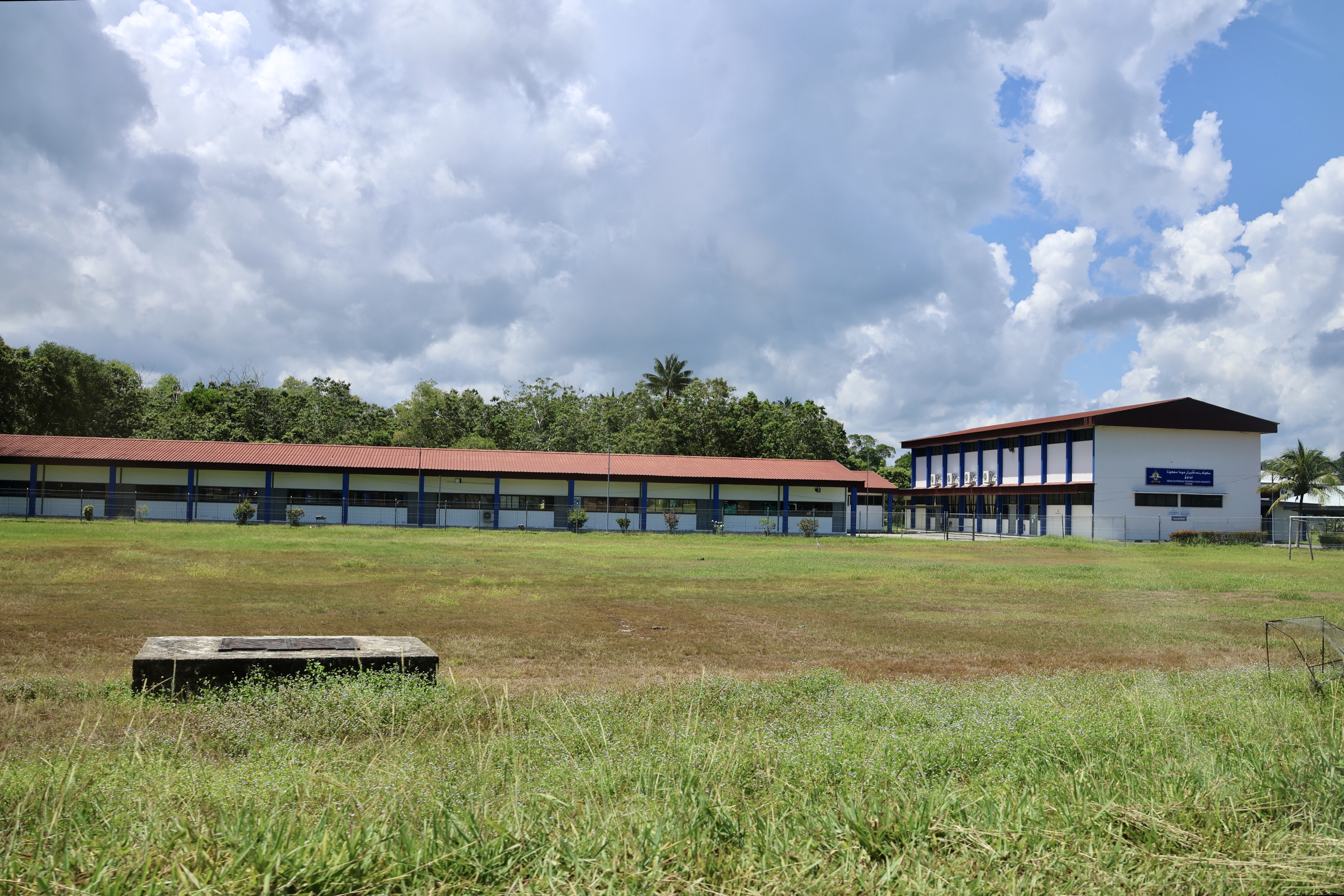
Pengiran Muda Mahkota Primary School

In terms of educational development, the village has its own school. In 1961, the residents of Kampong Penabai and Kampong Kuala Tutong collaborated to build a school building located in Kampong Kuala Tutong. The school was named Pengiran Muda Mahkota Primary School and was officially opened by Sultan Omar Ali Saifuddien III on 14 October 1962. The school's name was chosen in honour of then-Crown Prince (Pengiran Muda Mahkota) Hassanal Bolkiah. Prior to 1961, the villagers sent their children to study at Danau Malay School.

=== Religion ===
In 1981, a surau was built on government land, founded by Haji Mohd. Yusof bin Donglah and Haji Yusof bin Badar. The construction of the surau was carried out through a gotong-royong effort by the villagers. As the number of congregants increased, a mosque was built in 1988 near the existing surau, funded by donations from the villagers and the government. This mosque could accommodate up to 70 congregants. On 21 May 1993, a new mosque was built on a 0.60 acres (0.24 ha) plot of land, located about 5 kilometres (3.1 mi) from Tutong town, and its construction was completed on 4 November 1993. The cost of building this mosque was B$225,000.00, and it can accommodate up to 200 congregants at a time. The first imam appointed for Kampong Penabai Mosque in 1981 was Ustaz Ismail bin Arif. Before the establishment of these surau and mosques, the residents of Kampong Penabai and Kampong Kuala Tutong would perform Friday prayers at Kampong Danau Mosque. After the road connection between Kampong Penabai and Pekan Tutong was established, most villagers began performing Friday prayers at Hassanal Bolkiah Mosque.

=== Miscellaneous ===
The grave of Antah Kamis is located in Kampong Penabai, and is believed to be sacred due to a series of unusual events. In the 1960s, during a village fire, the grave remained untouched, leading to local belief in its mystical properties. The grave is said to have moved several times: initially found near Dayang Siti Rahmat's house in the 1960s, then relocated in the 1980s, and later moved again to its current position next to an electric pole. The grave features two tombstones made of wood and river stones, surrounded by a wooden embankment lined with round stones. The family of Antah Kamis maintains the site, replacing a wooden shelter over the grave three times, and annually cleaning and reading prayers for it during Ramadan. The grave attracts visitors who come to make vows, leaving offerings such as fruits, money, and candles. However, since the 1980s, authorities have restricted such practices, with the village head ensuring that such activities do not recur.
