= Penanjong Beach =

Beach in Tutong, Brunei

- Pantai Penanjong
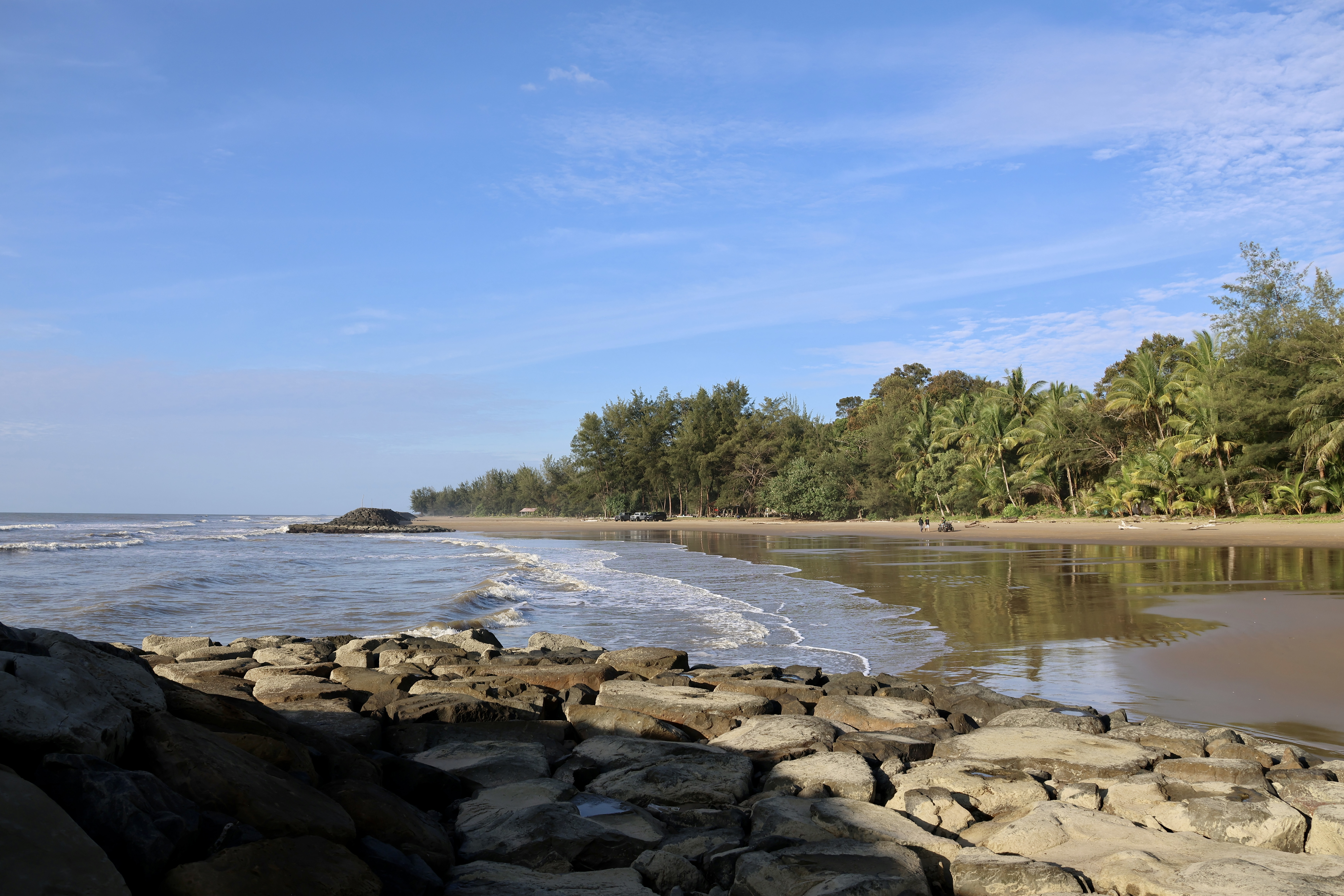
- Penanjong Beach in 2023

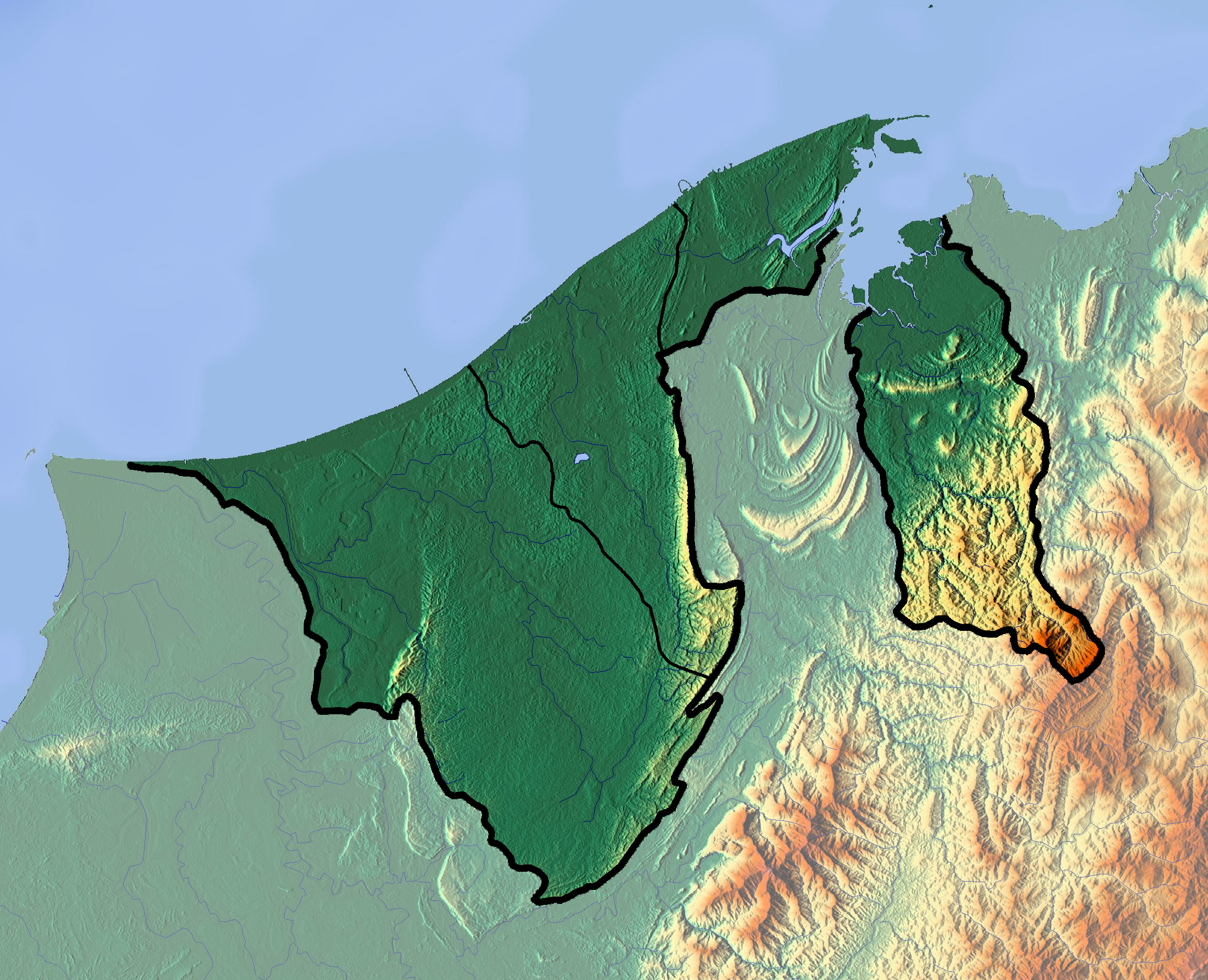
- Location within Brunei
- Location: Penanjong, Pekan Tutong, Tutong
- Nearest city: Bandar Seri Begawan, Brunei-Muara
- Coordinates: 4.8401164°N 114.6717411°E
- Governing body: Tutong Municipal Department

Penanjong Beach (Malay: Pantai Penanjong) is a beach in Kampong Penanjong, Pekan Tutong, Tutong, Brunei Darussalam. The beach is known for water sport activities and view of sunsets over the South China Sea. It should also be noted that parts of the beach which stretches from Penanjong are located within a military base.

An average of 8.7% heavy minerals such as quartz were found on the beach. On 24 January 2020, Royal Brunei Land Force (RBLF) servicemen from the nearby Penanjong Garrison carried out a cleaning campaign on the beach.
