= Abu Bakar Jambol =

Bruneian civil servant (1897–1976)

Yang Dimuliakan Pehin Datu Panglima Abu Bakar Jambol SMB PHBS PJK
- ابو بكر جمبول
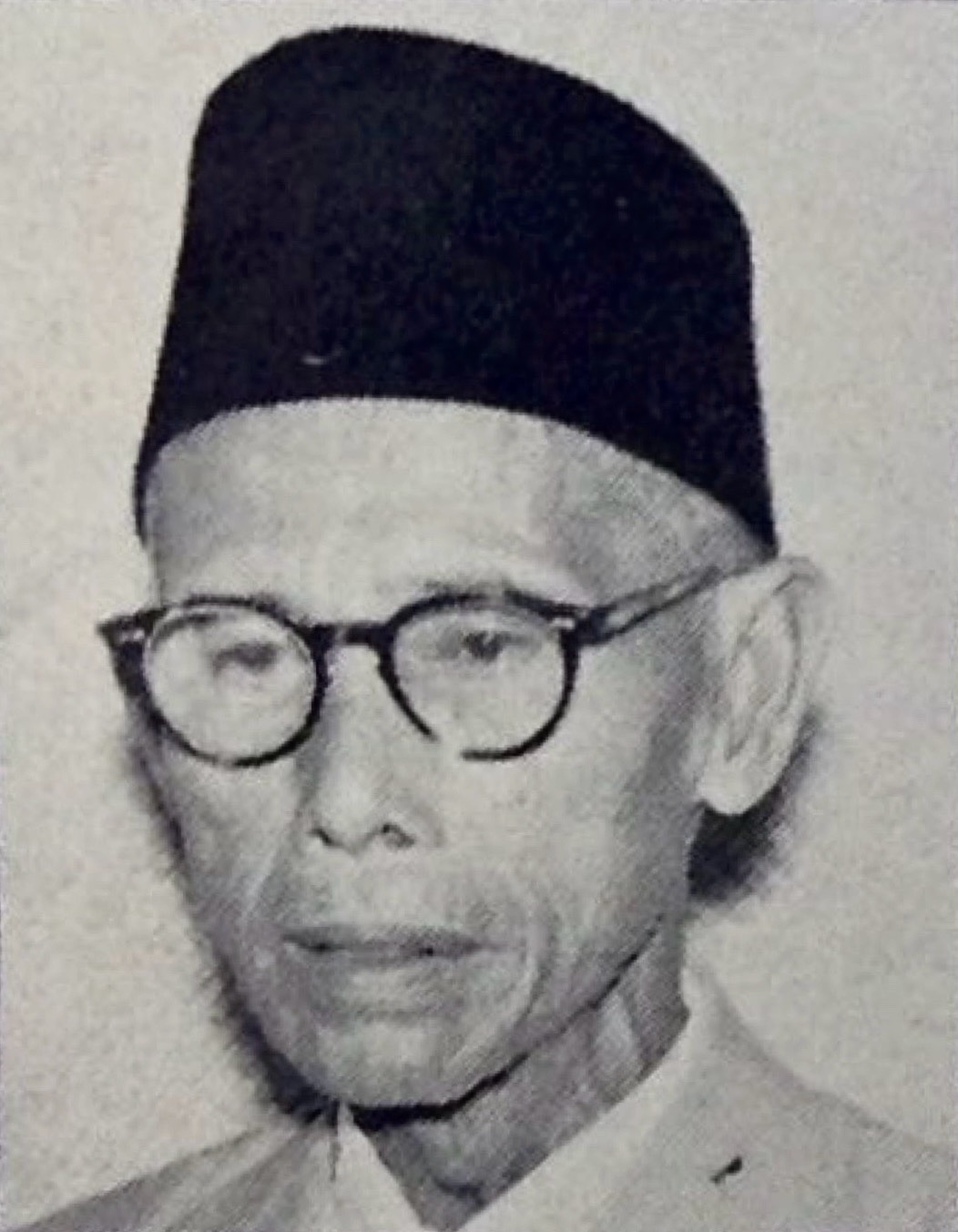
- Abu Bakar in c. 1959
- Born: 1897; Kampong Suran, Tutong, Brunei
- Died: 1976 (aged 78–79)
- Burial place: Sugan Muslim Cemetery, Bukit Bendera, Pekan Tutong
- Occupations: Civil servant; religious teacher
- Known for: Member of Tujuh Serangkai committee from 1953 to 1954

Abu Bakar bin Jambol (Note: The older spelling of his name is Abu Bakar bin Jambul.) (1897–1976) was a Bruneian aristocrat, civil servant and community leader of Tutong descent. He served as a member of the Tujuh Serangkai ("Seven Branches") committee from 1953 to 1954, tasked with gathering public opinions on the proposed constitution of Brunei from both rural and urban communities. The committee produced an extensive report and provided valuable guidance to Sultan Omar Ali Saifuddien III during the drafting process.

== Biography ==
Abu Bakar bin Jambol, born in 1897 in Kampung Suran, Tutong District, never attended school or received formal education. He began his government service in 1929 and later served as the Tutong District Officer. During the 1940s, he worked as a foreman and eventually became the religious judge of Tutong, handling household affairs. By 1950, he was teaching religion and the Qur'an at Bukit Bendera School and Tutong Mosque.

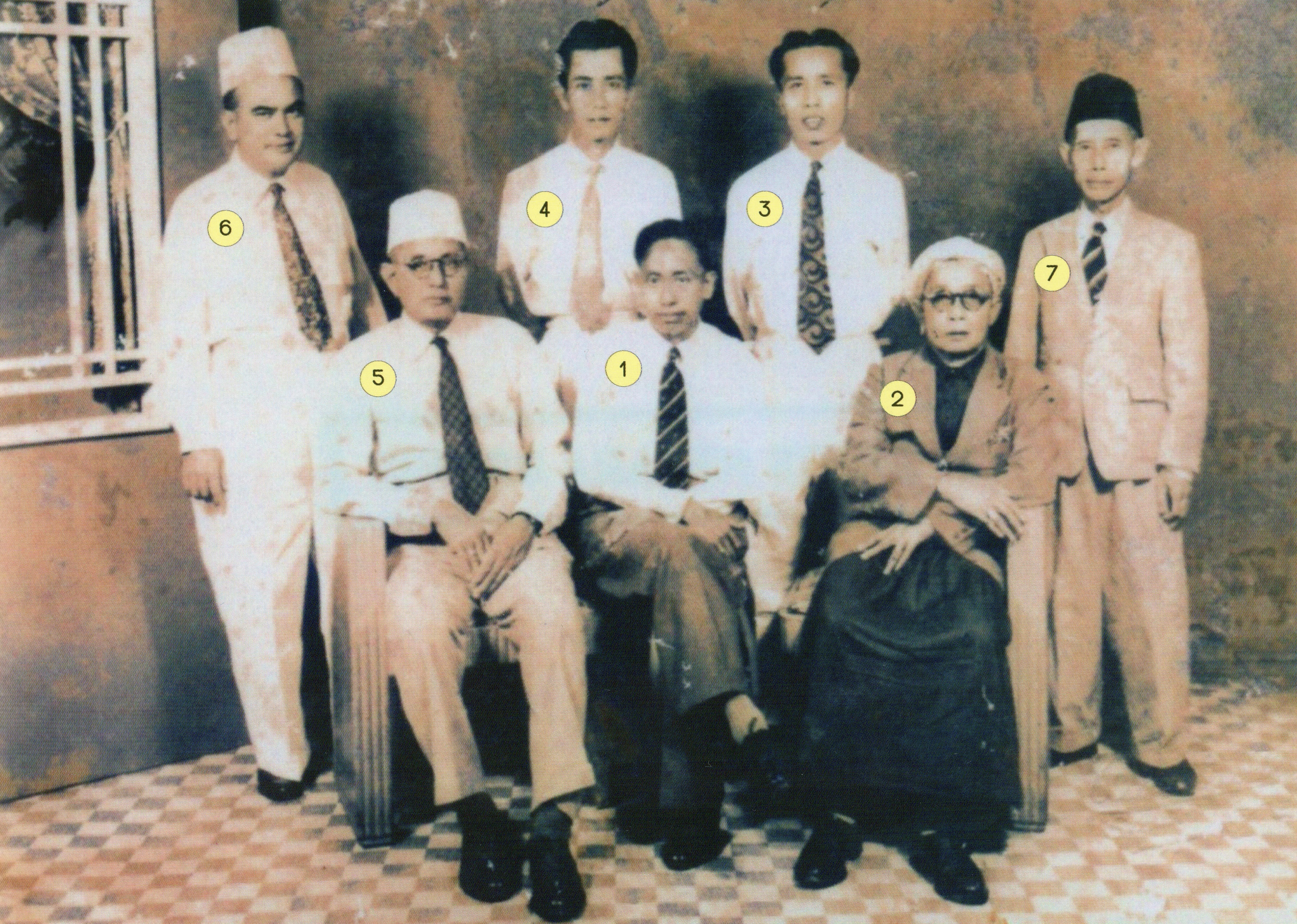
Abu Bakar (no. 7) in a group photograph with the other six members of the Tujuh Serangkai

Abu Bakar was one of seven individuals selected by Sultan Omar Ali Saifuddien III to join the special committee known as Tujuh Serangkai. This committee was tasked with gathering public input and suggestions for the formulation of Brunei's constitution, emphasising the vital connection between the monarchy and the people. During this significant constitutional reform, Abu Bakar and his fellow members, drawn from various esteemed positions, played a crucial role in representing grassroots perspectives.

In 1957, he was appointed a member of the Brunei State Council. Sultan Omar Ali Saifuddien III recognised his contributions and character in the Syair Perlembagaan Negeri Brunei, describing him as a small but charismatic figure, admired for his courage and eloquence.

On 23 September 1958, ahead of the sultan's birthday celebration, a gathering of 34 individuals in Tutong—including penghulus, titled men, village heads, and officials—selected representatives for the ceremony at the Lapau to deliver congratulatory speeches and appointed members of the organising committee. Abu Bakar was chosen as one of the representatives to embody the public's sentiments and support.

In another notable event on 14 October 1959, Abu Bakar joined a delegation of 21 representatives from Tutong District, comprising penghulus, village heads, and imams, to visit Istana Darul Hana. The group offered their congratulations to the Sultan on granting Brunei's constitution and pledged the people's cooperation for the nation's progress. They also endorsed the appointments of Ibrahim Mohammad Jahfar as Menteri Besar and Wan Ahmad Umar as the first State Secretary. The delegation acknowledged Pengiran Abu Bakar's effective leadership and expressed their hope for his continued service as Tutong District Officer.

Abu Bakar further demonstrated his loyalty during the sultan's visit to Tutong on 26 January 1963. Speaking on behalf of the local community, he delivered a formal address denouncing rebellion and reaffirming allegiance to the Sultan. His heartfelt speech, delivered during a celebration attended by approximately 1,000 people, symbolised the Tutong people's steadfast support for the monarchy during a challenging period of unrest.

Abu Bakar died in 1976. He was laid to rest at Sugan Muslim Cemetery, Bukit Bendera, Pekan Tutong.

== Personal life ==
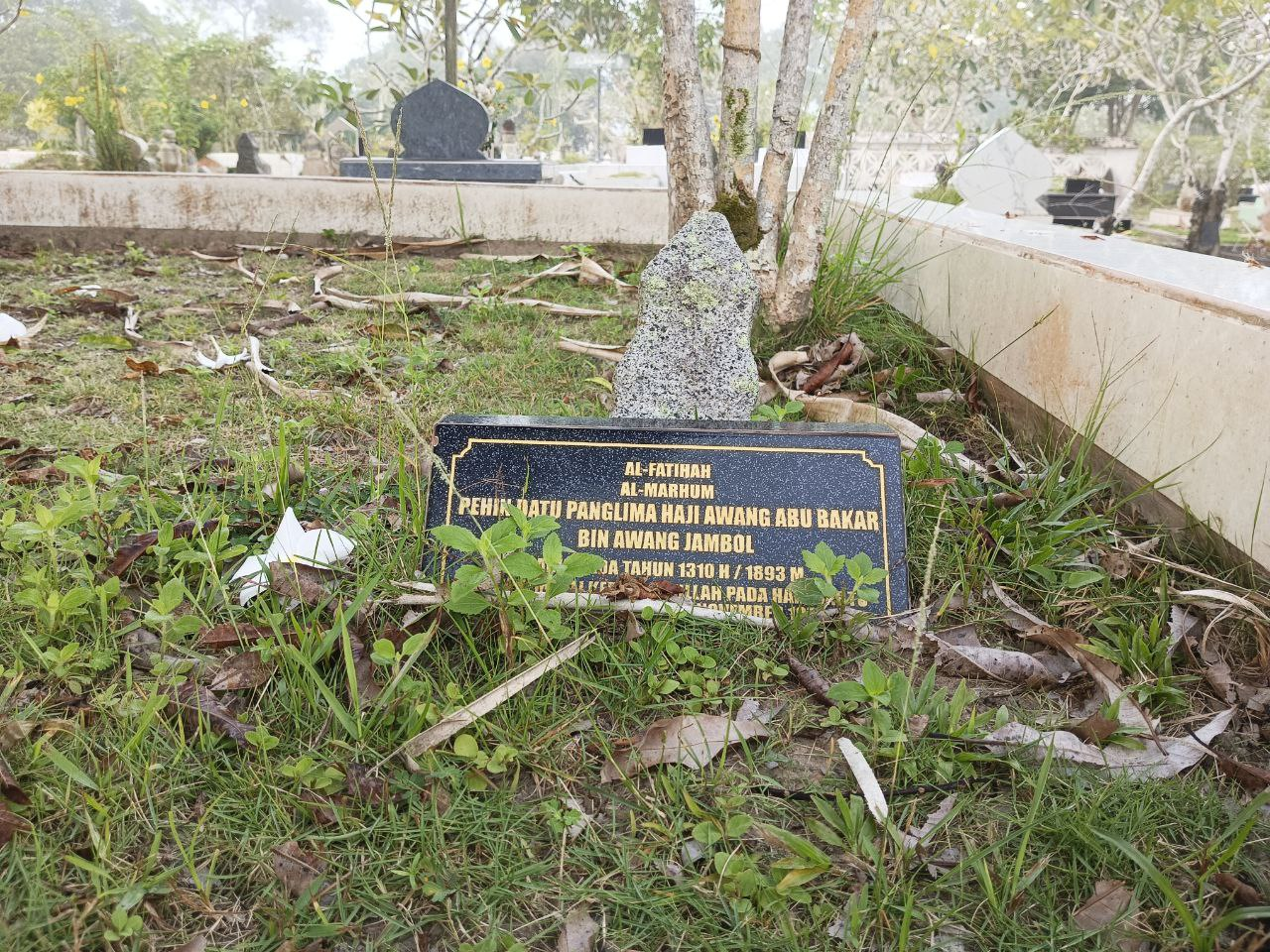
Grave of the late Pehin Hj Abu Bakar Jambol at Sugan Muslim Cemetery, Tutong

Abu Bakar's children have distinguished themselves in various fields. Orang Kaya Seri Wijaya Haji Abdullah, an aristocrat, managed financial and administrative affairs alongside the Director and later the Minister of Religious Affairs, while also representing Brunei at the International Quran Recital Competition in Kuala Lumpur. Haji Adnan served as president of the Brunei Students' Association in the United Kingdom and later became the manager of Syarikat PHA Bakar bin Jambol Petrol Station. Haji Abdi Manaf contributed as the former chairman of the Brunei Scouts, while Haji Kamaluddin was a member of the Brunei Youth Council. Meanwhile, Haji Abdul Hamid dedicated his career to education as a teacher at the Brunei Malay Teachers College.

== Titles, styles and honours ==
=== Titles and styles ===
On behalf of Sultan Omar Ali Saifuddien III, Pengiran Anak Safar traveled to Kampong Suran, Tutong, on 12 October 1960, to formally confer the title of Yang Mulia Penyurat on Abu Bakar, in recognition of his achievements and status. On 5 September 1974, he received the upgraded title of Pehin Datu Panglima, styled as Yang Dimuliakan.

- 12 October 1960 – 6 September 1974: Penyurat
- 6 September 1974 – 1976: Pehin Datu Panglima

=== Honours ===
Abu Bakar has been awarded the following national honours;

- Order of Seri Paduka Mahkota Brunei Third Class (SMB; 15 August 1966)
- Sultan Hassanal Bolkiah Medal First Class (PHBS; 17 May 1969)
- Meritorious Service Medal (PJK; 23 September 1961)
- Coronation Medal (1 August 1968)

=== Things named after him ===
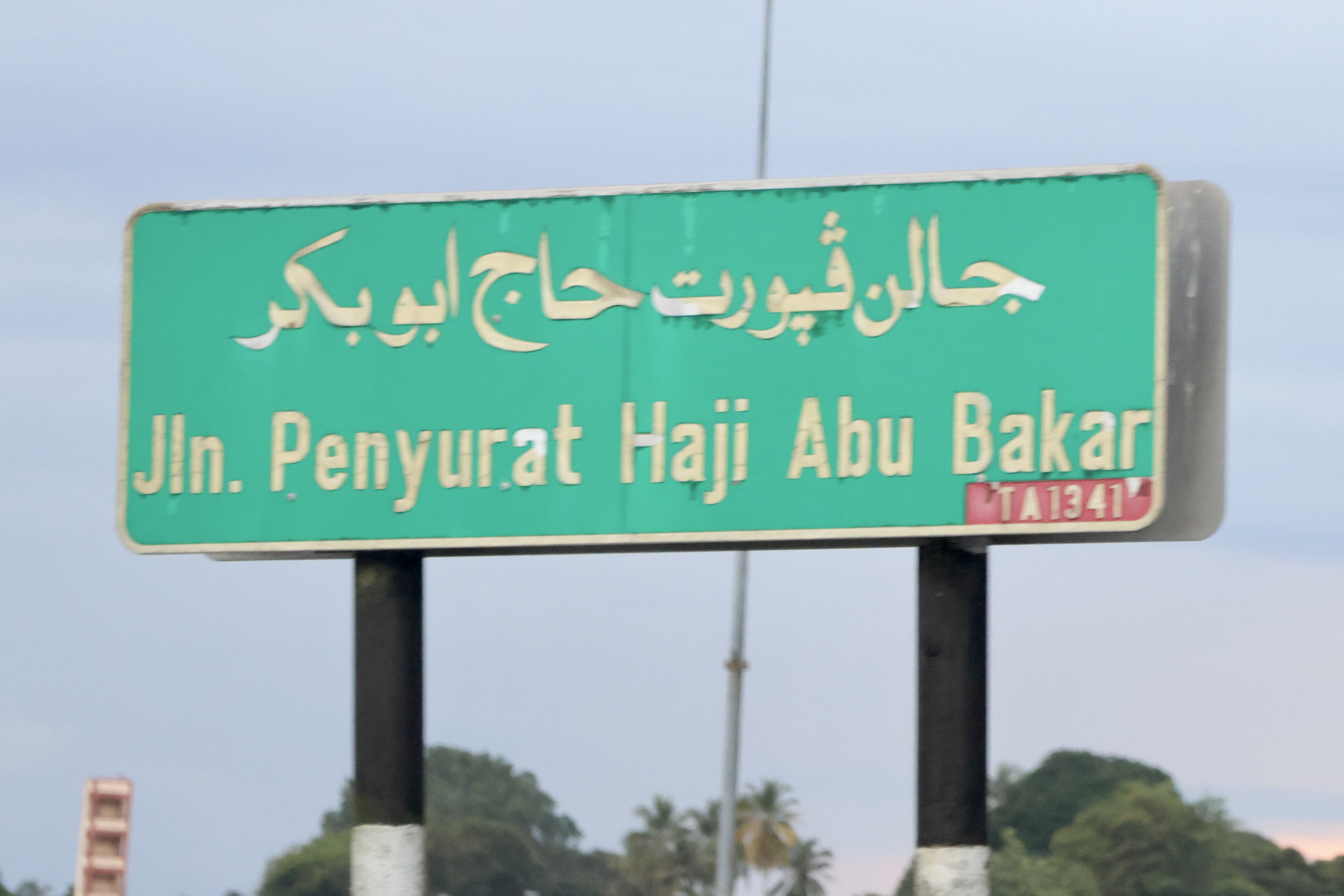
Jalan Penyurat Haji Abu Bakar sign

- Jalan Penyurat Haji Abu Bakar, a road in Bukit Bendera, Tutong
- Syarikat PHA Bakar bin Jambol Petrol Station, a fuelling station in Kampong Suran, Tutong
