= Kampong Panchor Papan =

Village in Tutong District, Brunei

Kampong Panchor Papan Kampung Panchor Papan
- Village
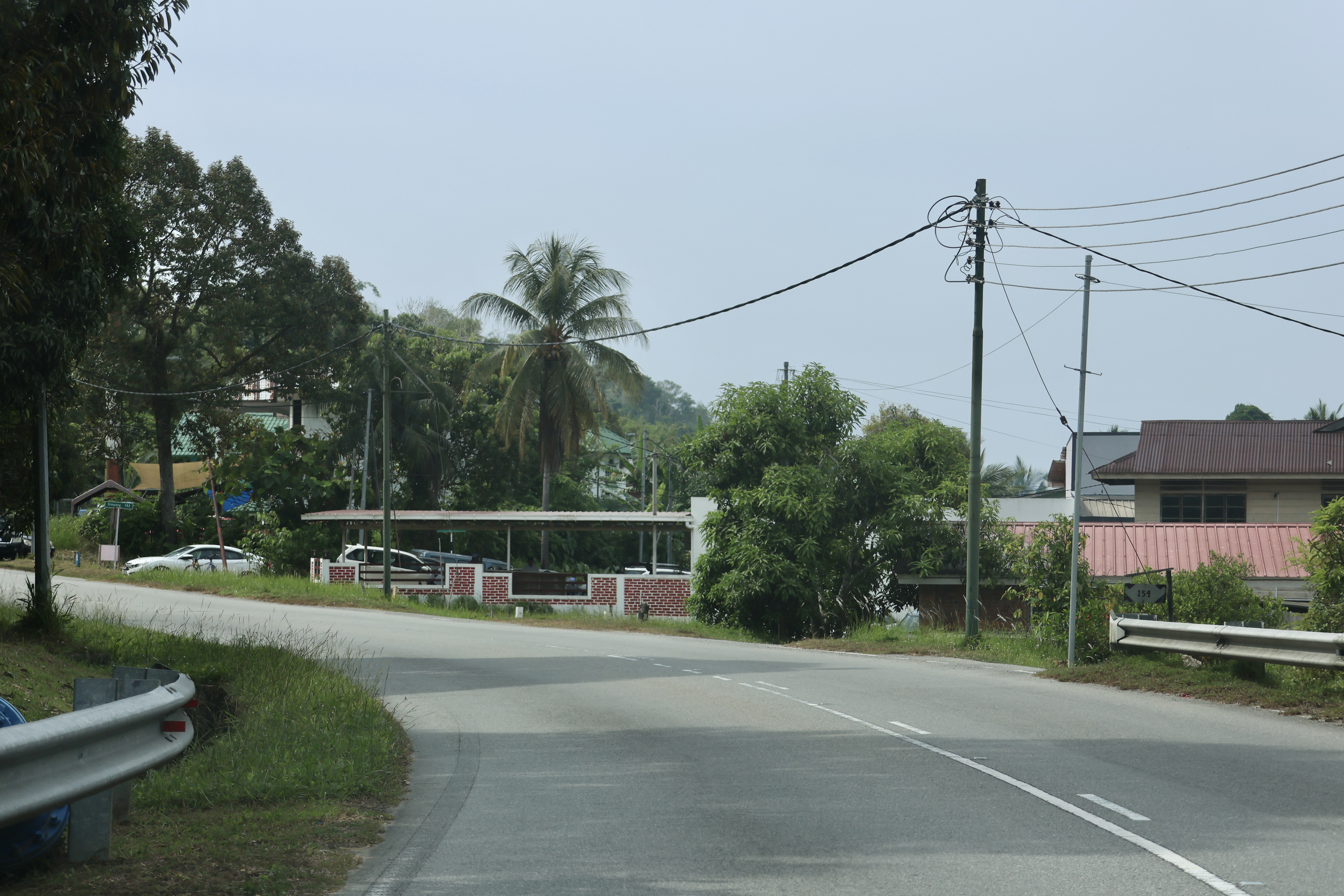
- Jalan Tutong

- Location in Brunei
- Coordinates: 4°48′46″N 114°40′26″E
- Country: Brunei
- District: Tutong
- Mukim: Pekan Tutong
- First settled: 19th century

Government
  - Village head: Adib Sulaiman

Population (2021)
  - Total: 358
- Postcode: TA1941

Kampong Panchor Papan (Malay: Kampong Panchor Papan) is a village located in the Tutong District of Brunei, within the mukim of Pekan Tutong. The village's postcode is TA1941. The name Panchor is shared by several villages in Brunei, including Kampong Panchor Murai in the Brunei–Muara District, as well as Kampong Panchor Papan and Kampong Panchor Dulit in the Tutong District. Today, Kampong Panchor Papan and Kampong Panchor Dulit are administratively combined under the name Kampong Panchor, with both villages being led by a ketua kampung (village head).

== Etymology ==
The name Panchor Papan originates from the method used by the village's early settlers to transport water. Upon discovering a spring on the slopes of Bukit Keramat, the villagers began constructing wooden troughs (pancur) to channel the water to their homes. This technique of using wooden planks to direct the water became known as pancur papan, and over time, it became synonymous with the village itself. The practice of using planks (papan) and the water source became so central to the community's identity that the name Panchor Papan was adopted, and the village became officially known by this name. The area where the planks were used to channel water gradually became the focal point of the settlement, solidifying its place in the village's history.

The history of the village also includes the discovery of other water sources. For example, a villager named Bidah found a significant spring at a location known as Arung Bidah. This spring, which produced a large amount of water, was tapped and became another key water supply for the villagers. Over time, the name Arung Bidah became associated with the area.

== Geography ==
Kampong Panchor Papan is located on the steep slopes of Bukit Keramat, rising 60 feet (18 m) above sea level. Geographically, it lies to the east of Bukit Keramat, bordered by a peat swamp near the mouth of the Kelakas River. The village is connected by a main road leading from Bandar Seri Begawan to Kuala Belait, spanning approximately 3 kilometres (1.9 mi). To the northeast, Kampong Panchor Papan borders Kampong Tanah Buruk, while to the west, it borders Kampong Panchor Dulit, which is adjacent to Kampong Suran. Historically, Kampong Panchor Papan and Kampong Panchor Dulit were inhabited by the same community due to their close proximity.

== History ==
The history of Kampung Panchor Papan is connected to its early settlers, primarily from Brunei, who initially resided in Kampong Ayer in the capital, Bandar Seri Begawan. These settlers, alongside the local inhabitants, built their homes along the banks of the Tutong River, near Lurah Saban and Kuala Sungai Birau, possibly under the instructions of the sultan or local leaders. They were also likely traders or missionaries of Islam. The decision to settle by the river was strategic; it provided a defensive position against the Kayan people from Baram, who often conducted raids (referred to as ayau) that posed a threat to the villagers' lives. The riverbank became an ideal location for these early families, offering both protection and resources.

By the early 19th century, following the defeat of the Kayan people, the villagers began to move slightly inland, establishing their homes on the slopes of Bukit Keramat. They relocated to a new site along the southern and western banks of Muara Sungai Kelakas, near the eastern edge of Bukit Keramat, which offered essential resources for family life, particularly a reliable supply of clean water from natural springs around the hill. This shift was likely driven by the increasing safety of the area and the need for more space. Despite moving away from the river, the settlers maintained their proximity to water, reflecting a common practice among communities of the time, as rivers and seas were crucial for transportation and livelihood.

As the village grew, the settlers faced the challenge of securing a reliable water supply. Initially, they relied on rainwater, which was infrequent and seasonal. Eventually, they discovered natural springs along the slopes of the hill and began to use these as their primary water source. However, the springs were located far from the settlement, and fetching water from them was difficult and time-consuming. To overcome this, the villagers constructed a system to channel the water to their homes using connected wooden planks. This method became essential to the community's daily life.

== Places of interest ==
The grave of Tuan Saie is located in the Islamic cemetery of Panchor Papan. The gravestone, made of sandstone, stands about 1 foot tall and has no inscriptions. Tuan Saie is believed to have been an Arab, possibly known as Tuan Sheikh or Syarif, though his exact name remains unidentified. He is thought to have had three siblings, each buried in different locations, including across Kampong Danau, Kuala Tutong, and in Baram, Sarawak. The grave is considered sacred, as the area is said to have never collapsed or burned during past forest fires. It is a popular site for people seeking blessings, making vows, or praying for healing, with coins and money often found around the grave.

== Mythology ==
The tale of Lubang Harimau (Tiger's Lair) in Kampong Panchor Papan is said to have unfolded in the 19th century. The site, located to the north, lay not far from Arung Bidah and Wasai Panchor Papan. At that time, the villagers of Kampong Panchor Papan were accustomed to building their homes in waterlogged areas on peat soil near the western bank of Muara Sungai Kelakas. Thanks to the abundance of spring water near the foot of Bukit Keramat, they constructed numerous wells along the hill's base. These wells became their primary source of water for bathing and daily needs, and the villagers often spent time relaxing near them, even though they were situated some distance from their homes.

According to oral tradition, the victim in the story of Lubang Harimau was a woman named Jamilah, a native of the village. Her predator was not an actual tiger but a mysterious stranger of unknown origin. Described as a harimau jadian (were-tiger), this man exhibited tiger-like traits and was known to the villagers as a were-tiger. He was said to have hidden in a cave at the base of Bukit Keramat.

One evening, Jamilah and her husband, Budin, newly married for just a week, went to one of the wells near the hill to bathe and fetch water. The well, surrounded by dense vegetation, was far from their home by the riverbank, adding an air of unease to their routine visit. Unbeknownst to them, the were-tiger was watching from the bushes and trees nearby. Without warning, the creature emerged. Startled and terrified, the couple froze in fear. Ignoring Budin, the were-tiger seized Jamilah roughly and dragged her away. Budin, paralysed by fear, could not stop the abduction. The were-tiger disappeared with Jamilah into the cave at the hill's base.

Desperate for help, Budin shouted and ran back to inform his family. The news of Jamilah's abduction alarmed the entire village. Villagers quickly gathered and rushed to the well, where they began searching the area. As they cautiously approached the cave where Jamilah was held captive, their fear of the fierce were-tiger prevented them from acting directly. The were-tiger kept Jamilah in the cave for a prolonged period, intending to make her his wife.

Despite constant vigilance to prevent the were-tiger from escaping with Jamilah, the villagers lacked the courage and means to defeat the creature. Numerous efforts were made to subdue it, including calling upon skilled individuals from nearby and distant villages. Even Jamilah's father, Panglima Badar, a manteri renowned for his spiritual prowess, could not overcome the beast.

Eventually, the family turned to their relatives in Labuan, seeking the help of Si Kabul, a courageous and invincible warrior related to Panglima Badar. After several days of travel, Si Kabul arrived in Panchor Papan and devised a plan. Armed with keris (traditional daggers), the villagers mustered their courage and joined Si Kabul in a daring assault on the cave. In a swift and well-coordinated attack, they succeeded in defeating the ferocious were-tiger after an intense struggle. Jamilah, who had been held captive for nearly 30 days, was finally rescued. Exhausted and frail, she was reunited with her family.

In the aftermath of the harrowing incident, the villagers established a custom prohibiting newlyweds from leaving their homes during the early days of marriage, intending to prevent similar misfortunes. Additionally, the practice of washing the feet of the bride and groom during the wedding ceremony became a symbolic ritual to ward off harm in the initial stages of marriage. Over time, this practice evolved into a cherished tradition among the Tutong community, particularly in Kampong Panchor Papan and surrounding villages. To this day, the custom of foot-washing during weddings remains a significant cultural heritage in the Tutong district.
