= Kampong Penanjong =

Village in Brunei

Kampong Penanjong Kampung Penanjong
- Village
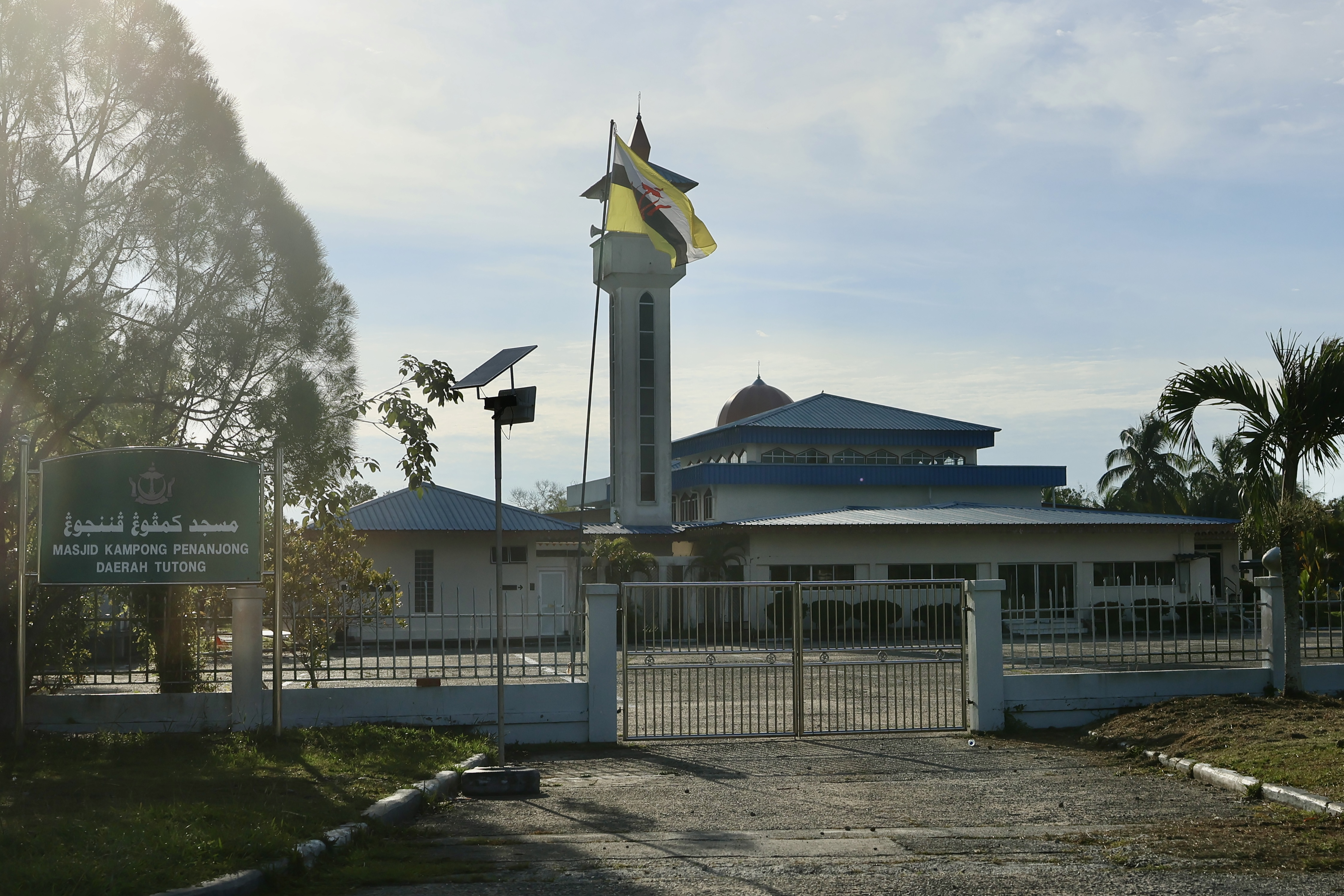
- Kampong Penanjong Mosque

- Location in Brunei
- Coordinates: 4°50′27″N 114°40′54″E
- Country: Brunei
- District: Tutong
- Mukim: Pekan Tutong
- First settled: 19th century
- Founder: Muhamad bin Agar

Government
  - Village head: Ariffin Akip

Population (2021)
  - Total: 1,856
- Time zone: UTC+8 (BNT)
- Postcode: TA2741

Kampong Penanjong (Malay: Kampong Penanjong) is a village located in the Tutong District of Brunei, within the mukim of Pekan Tutong. The village's postcode is TA1941. It has a population of 1,856 in 2021, with the majority of the population consisting of the Tutong people. Situated about 8 kilometres (5.0 mi) from Tutong town, the settlement is divided into two distinct areas: Kampong Tanah Buruk and Kampong Penanjong. Each area. Kampong Tanah Buruk lies between the junction of Jalan Kampung Penanjong and Jalan Tutong Kem, while Kampong Penanjong extends beyond that, leading towards the sea road, and continues until the junction of Jalan Binturan Kem.

== Etymology ==
The name Kampong Penanjong is derived from the term "tanjung" (cape), as the village appeared to protrude towards the sea when viewed from Sungai Kelakas, one of the earliest villages of the Tutong people before they relocated to Kampong Penanjong. On the other hand, Kampong Tanah Buruk, another early settlement of the Tutong people, is closely connected to the inhabitants of Kampong Penanjong through family ties. There are two theories about the origin of the name Tanah Buruk. The first suggests that "buruk" refers to the aftermath of a conflict between the Tutong and Dusun people. According to village resident oral history, many people were killed in the battle, and their bodies were left to decompose, creating a foul stench. Consequently, the area became known as Tanah Buruk. The second theory connects the name to an incident in which a large number of fish called "karok" died after being poisoned by the villagers. The dead fish washed up along the river, creating a strong, unpleasant odour, and thus the area came to be known as Tanah Buruk.

== History ==
Among the earliest settlers in Kampong Penanjong was Muhamad bin Agar, who is believed to have moved to the village at the end of the 19th century. It is also believed that his family was the first to establish the village, initially using the area for rice cultivation. As the area proved suitable for settlement, the residents gradually made it their home and formed a community. The village eventually became a settlement when the people from Kuala Parit, Sungai Kelakas, moved to the inland and chose Tanah Buruk as their new home. The earliest residents of Tanah Buruk were the family of Pengarah Abdul Rahman bin Khatib Muhit, who hailed from Kampong Sungai Kedayan in the Brunei–Muara District. He later settled in Kuala Parit, Sungai Kelakas, in search of a new livelihood and married Dayang Siti, a Tutong woman from Kuala Birau. Their children included Kula, Md. Salleh (Penyurat Salleh), Yusof, Saifuddin (Talipuddin), Ghafor, and Rabiah.

== Administration ==
The name Kampong Tanah Buruk still exists and remains to this day. However, in terms of village administration, it is considered part of the Kampong Penanjong area. The position of ketua kampung (village head) began in 1918, with the first village head being Julak bin Takin. He was succeeded by his son, Shamsudin bin Julak. The third village head was Haji Othman bin Shamsuddin, followed by Sapar bin Lakim. The position was then passed to his son, Haji Sulaiman bin Sapar. On 10 August 1996, the position has been held by Ahmad Juriah bin Ibrahim.

== Infrastructure ==
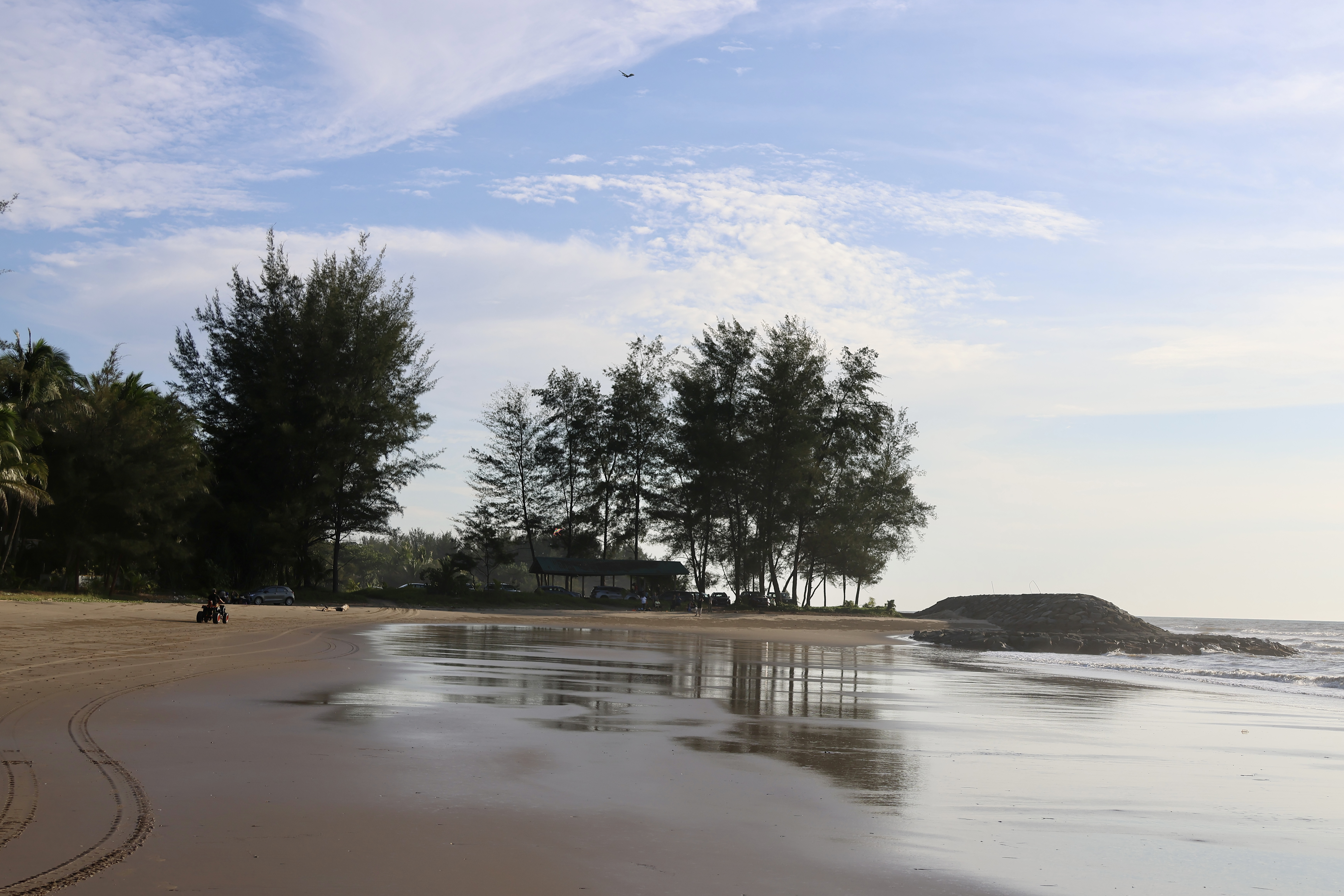
Penanjong Beach

The Training Institute Royal Brunei Armed Forces is located within Penanjong Garrison. The institute plays a central role in the training and development of enlisted male and female recruits, as well as offering technical and junior leadership courses for non-commissioned officers. The base serves as a key military training hub, where TI RBAF conducts around 100 courses annually.

Penanjong Beach is known for water sport activities and view of sunsets over the South China Sea. It should also be noted that parts of the beach which stretches from Penanjong are located within Penanjong Garrison.

=== Education ===
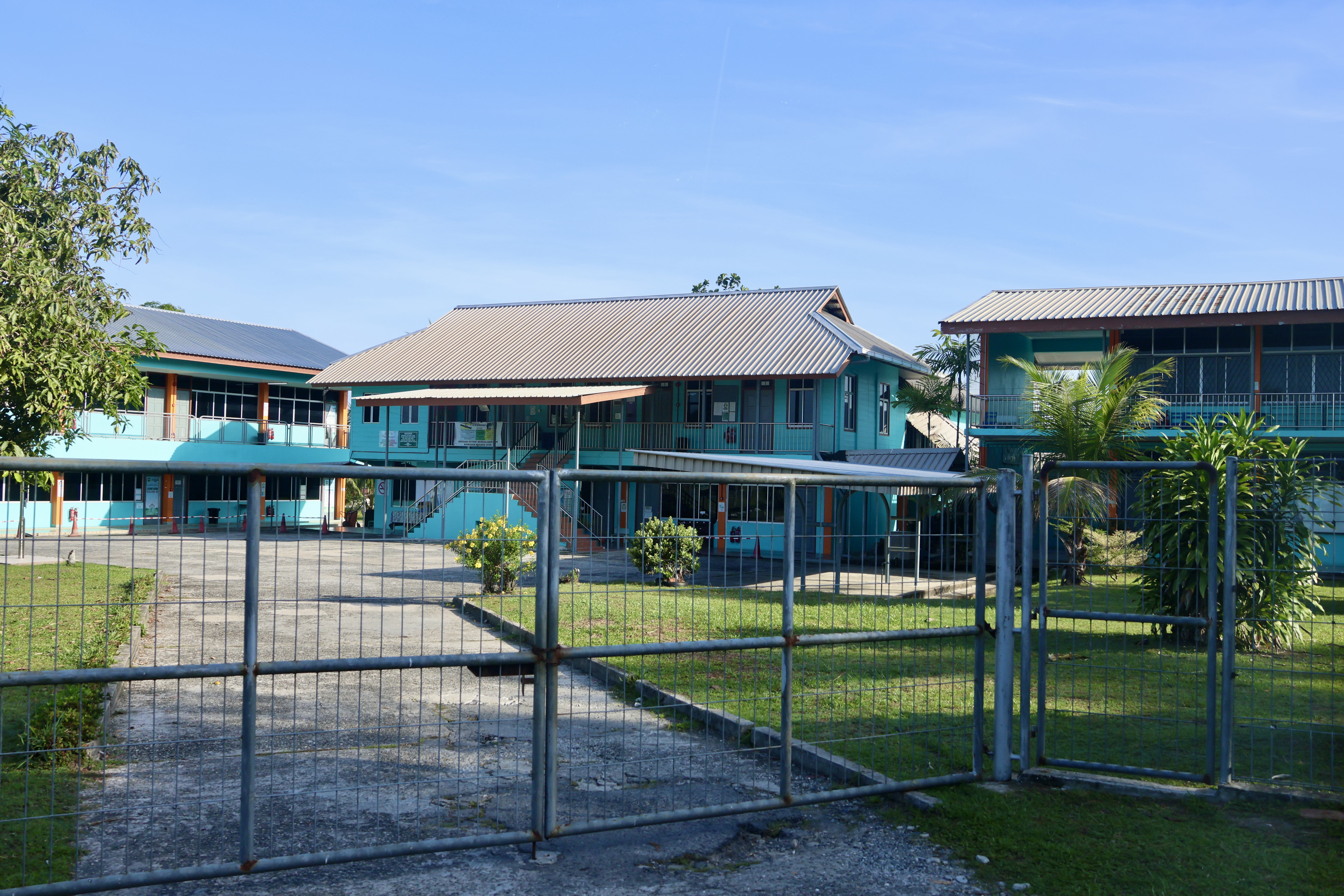
Penanjong Primary School

Kampung Penanjong began to develop under the administration of the village head, Haji Othman. One of the achievements of the residents of Penanjong was the construction of a temporary school building in 1936, which was made from bamboo. This school is now known as Penanjong Primary School. At that time, the school had only 32 students, consisting of 27 male students and 5 female students. The first teacher at the school was Haji Idris bin Hamzah. In 1938, a permanent school building was constructed using concrete. Due to the increase in the number of students, the villagers, with the help of the government, built a new building on the site of the old one. The new building consisted of three blocks and two Class F houses. Block A was the permanent building completed in 1956, while Block B and Block C were built in 1967. The school had about 158 students in 2002.

=== Religion ===
In addition to focusing on academic education for the village's residents, religious education was also prioritised and developed when a mosque was built on 26 June 1960. The mosque was constructed through gotong-royong efforts on land donated by Mohd. Tahir bin Husin, at a cost of about B$5,946.48, and was completed on 11 February 1961. The mosque began operation on 15 February 1961, and was used for Friday prayers starting from 17 February 1961. The mosque was named Cahaya Derma Bakti Mosque and was officially opened by Sultan Omar Ali Saifuddien III on 25 August 1961. (Note: The congregation had relocated to Kampong Penanjong Mosque, therefore the Cahaya Derma Bakti Mosque stopped chanting the call to prayer on 14 December 1983.) To accommodate the growing congregation, the government constructed a new mosque building on 30 March 1983 at a cost of approximately $680,000. The new mosque, located at the edge of the village near Tutong Camp, can accommodate more than 500 congregants. The first imam of the mosque was Haji Abdul Wahab bin Haji Othman, and the bilal was Zainal bin Tunggal.
