= Kampong Panchor Dulit =

Village in Tutong District, Brunei

Kampong Panchor Dulit Kampung Panchor Dulit
- Village
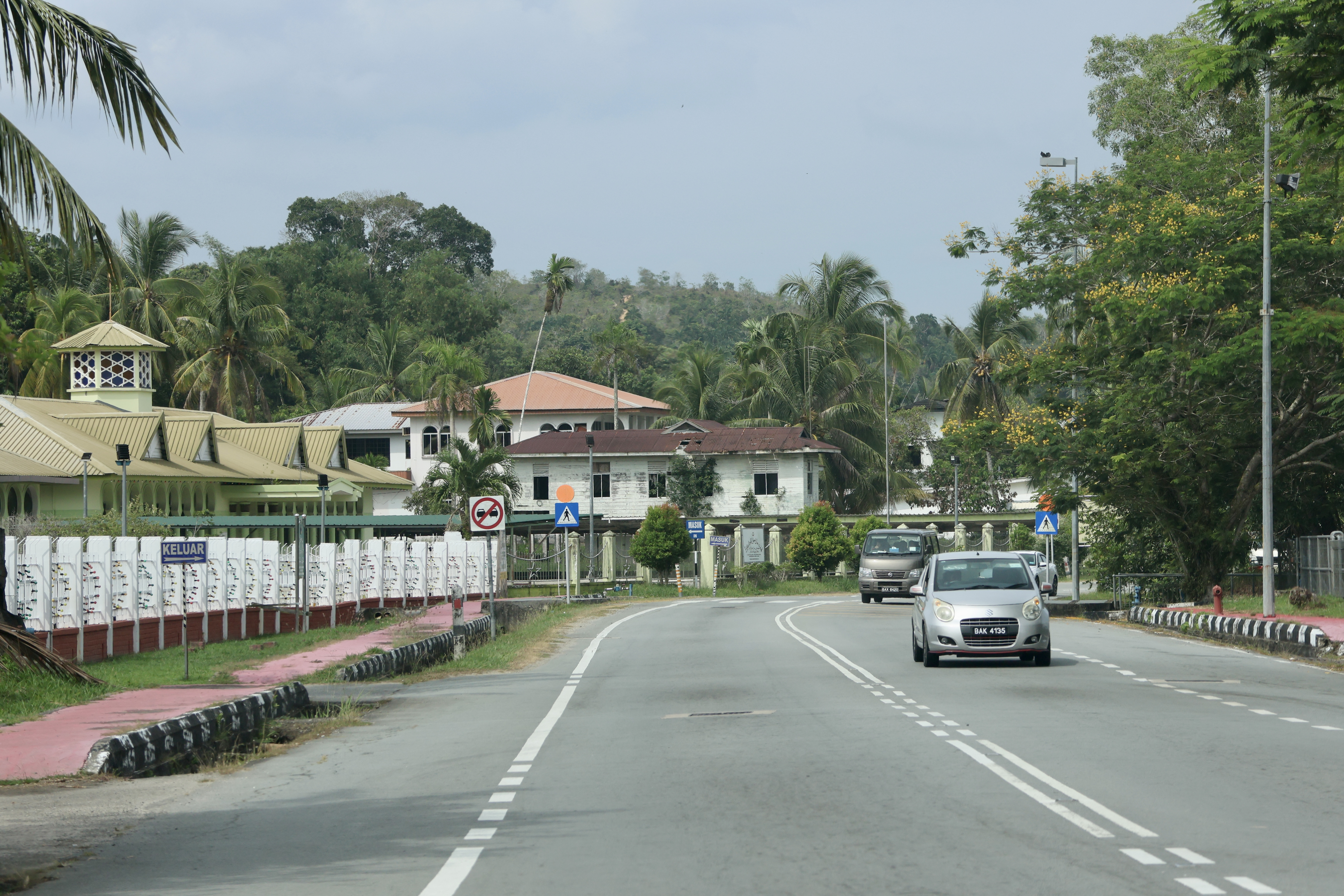
- Jalan Tutong

- Location in Brunei
- Coordinates: 4°48′18″N 114°39′57″E
- Country: Brunei
- District: Tutong
- Mukim: Pekan Tutong
- First settled: 19th century

Government
  - Village head: Adib Sulaiman

Population (2021)
  - Total: 478
- Postcode: TA2141

Kampong Panchor Dulit (Malay: Kampung Panchor Dulit) is a village located in the Tutong District of Brunei, within the mukim of Pekan Tutong. The village's postcode is TA1941. The name Panchor is shared by several villages in Brunei, including Kampong Panchor Murai in the Brunei–Muara District, as well as Kampong Panchor Dulit and Kampong Panchor Papan in the Tutong District. Today, Kampong Panchor Dulit and Kampong Panchor Papan are administratively combined under the name Kampong Panchor, with both villages being led by a ketua kampung (village head).

== Etymology ==
The name Panchor Dulit originates from the method used by the village's early settlers to transport water. Upon discovering a spring on the slopes of Bukit Keramat, the villagers began constructing wooden troughs (pancur) to channel the water to their homes. This technique of using tree bark (kulit) to direct the water became known as pancur dulit, and over time, it became synonymous with the village itself. Over time, the pronunciation of "kulit" evolved, eventually becoming "dulit." The area where water was channeled through the bark became known as Kampong Panchor Dulit, and the stream formed by the water flow came to be called Sungai Dulit.

== Geography ==
Kampong Panchor Dulit, located in the Tutong District of Brunei, was once inhabited by the same community as Kampong Panchor Papan due to their close proximity. Geographically, the village lies to the west/south of Bukit Keramat, which rises 60 feet (18 m) above sea level, on relatively gentle terrain. It is bordered to the west by Kampong Suran and is connected to Kampong Panchor Papan by a main road leading from the capital, Bandar Seri Begawan, to Kuala Belait, which stretches about 3 kilometres (1.9 mi). The village is positioned along the slopes of Bukit Keramat, providing a strategic location within the region.

== History ==
The history of Kampong Panchor Dulit is closely intertwined with the stories of nearby Kampong Panchor Papan. Like Panchor Papan, its early settlers were predominantly from Brunei, with many coming from Kampong Ayer in the capital. They settled along the banks of Tutong River, surrounding Lurah Saban and Kuala Sungai Birau, and likely included those sent by the sultan or local nobles, as well as traders and missionaries.

The villagers chose to live along the riverbanks to avoid conflicts with the Kayan people from the Baram region, who were known for their raiding expeditions (ayau), which threatened the safety of local settlements. The riverbanks provided a secure location for establishing homes and family life. Once the threat from the Kayan people was subdued, the villagers began to shift gradually inland to the foothills of Bukit Keramat, likely beginning in the early 19th century.

Living by the river was typical of the time, as rivers and seas were vital transportation routes and sources of livelihood. Despite their move to the land, the villagers continued to build their homes in proximity to water. As the settlement expanded, they sought alternative water sources. While they had previously relied on rainwater, which was sporadic and seasonal, their search for a reliable water supply led to the discovery of springs along the hillside. The villagers worked together to protect and manage these water sources, using various tools to collect and store water in their homes. However, fetching water from the springs became a difficult and unsafe task, so they devised a system to channel the water to their homes. The villagers used wooden planks, which they called pancur, to direct the water from the spring to their residences.

The water supply in Panchor Dulit was abundant, leading some villagers to construct babang (dams) to capture and store the water. Initially, wooden babangs were built, but later, concrete structures were used to contain the water. In the early 1950s, during British colonial administration, the government, through the Public Works Department, tapped into the Panchor Dulit water supply to provide drinking water for the town of Tutong. A clean water reservoir system was built, with water being pumped through pipes to a large water tank on Bukit Bendera. However, by the 1970s, when the water supply project in Kampong Layong was established, the need for water from Panchor Dulit diminished, and the village no longer relied on this source. As of 2023, the former water reservoir area has become overgrown with mud and wild plants, and the once-productive water source has lost its previous significance.

== Infrastructure ==
- Hassanal Bolkiah Mosque, opened in 1966, can accommodate up to 1,000 worshippers.
- Syarikat PHA Bakar bin Jambol Petrol Station, a fuelling station in Kampong Suran.
- Sugan Tutong Muslim Cemetery

== Notable people ==
- Abu Bakar Jambol (1897–1976), community leader and civil servant
