= Kampong Serambangun =

Serambangun
- Village
- Kampong Serambangun
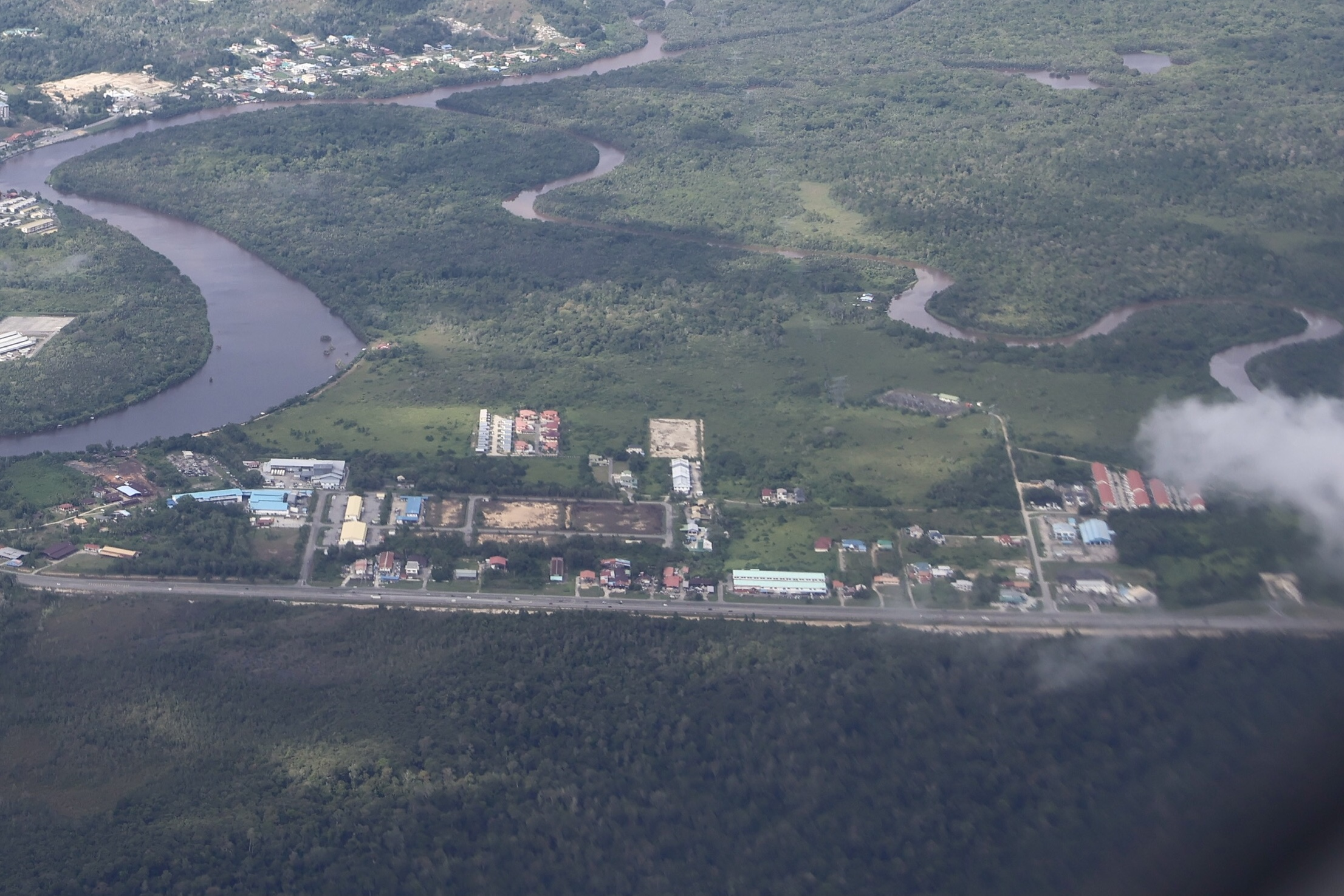
- Kampung Serambangun in the year 2023

- A map showing Kampong Serambangun in Brunei.
- Coordinates (Kampong Serambangun): 4.7860369°N 114.6505570°E
- Country: Brunei
- District: Tutong
- Mukim: Pekan Tutong

Area
  - Total: 2.093 km^{2} (0.808 sq mi)

Population (2021)
  - Total: 502
  - Density: 240/km^{2} (621/sq mi)
- Postcode: TA2541

Kampong Serambangun (Malay for Serambangun Village) is a village in Tutong District, Brunei, within the mukim of Pekan Tutong. The postcode for Kampong Serambangun is TA2541. The village had a population of 502 in 2021.
