= Mukim Pekan Tutong =

Mukim in Brunei

- Mukim
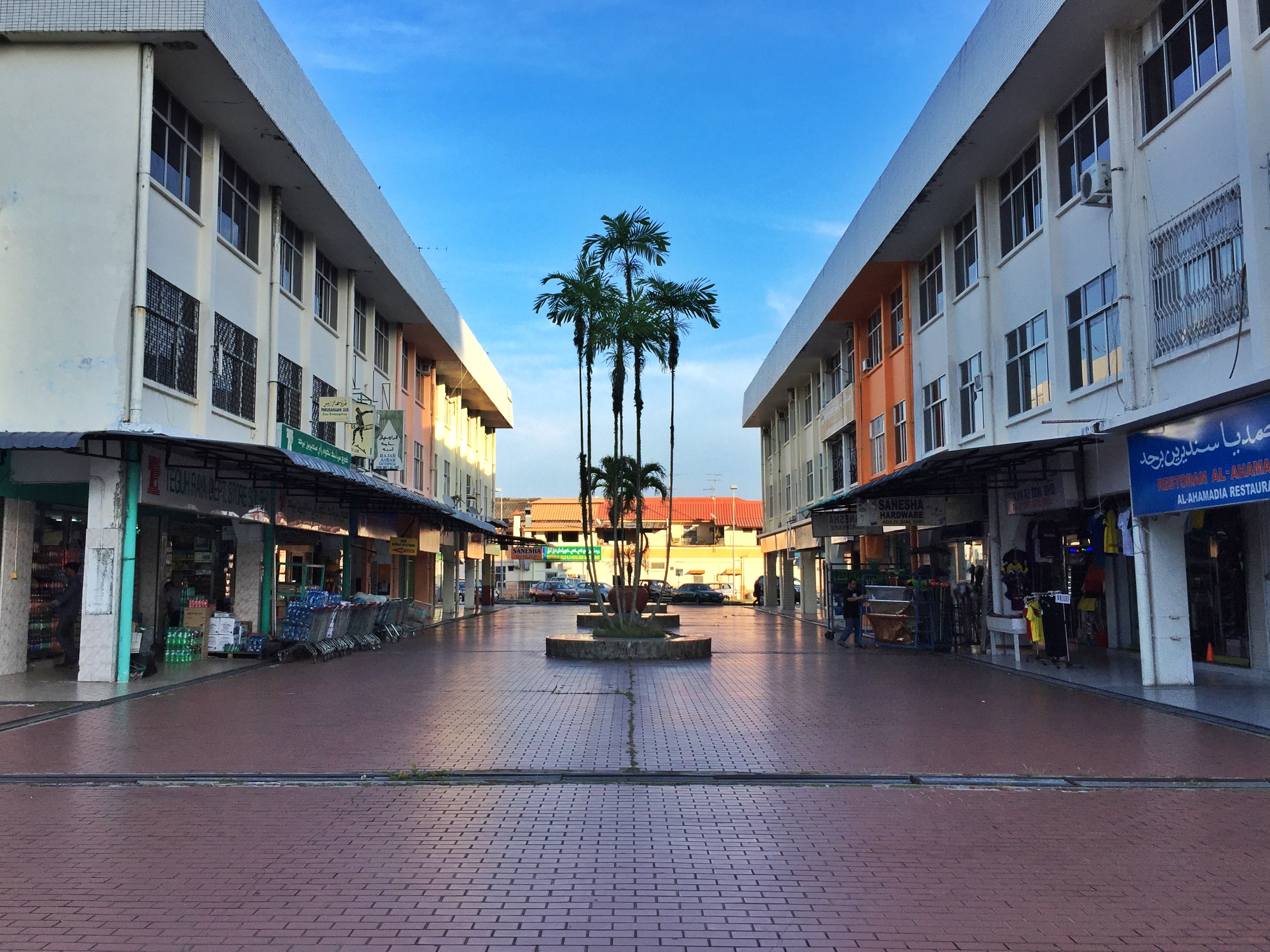
- Pekan Tutong

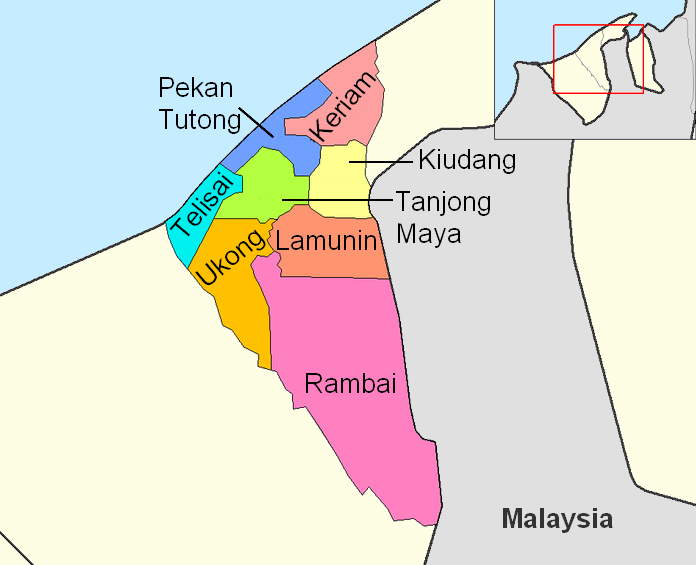
- Pekan Tutong is in dark blue.
- Coordinates: 4.8°N 114.65°E
- Country: Brunei
- District: Tutong

Government
  - Penghulu: Salim Othman

Population (2021)
  - Total: 9,883
- Time zone: UTC+8 (BNT)
- Postcode: TAxx41

Mukim Pekan Tutong is a mukim in Tutong District, Brunei. The population was 9,883 in 2021. It encompasses Pekan Tutong, the district's sole town and administrative centre.

== Geography ==
The mukim is located in the north-west of Tutong District, bordering the South China Sea to the north-west, Mukim Keriam to the east, Mukim Kiudang to the south-east, Mukim Tanjong Maya to the south and Mukim Telisai to the south-west.

The Tutong River runs its course through the mukim and flows out into South China Sea. There are a few islands along the river, among them the islets of Setawat (Pulau Setawat) and Bakuku (Pulau Bakuku).

== Demographics ==
As of 2021 census, the population was 9,883 with 52.7% males and 47.3% females. The mukim had 1,991 households occupying 1,875 dwellings. The mukim is predominantly urban; 85.9% lived in urban areas in contrast to 14.1% in rural areas.

== Administration ==
As of 2021, the mukim comprised the following villages:

Settlements	Population (2021)	Ketua kampung (2024)
Kampong Petani	1,087	Zambri bin Haji Ibrahim
Bukit Bendera	931	—N/a
Tutong Camp	1,213	—N/a
Kampong Penanjong	1,856	Muhammad Ariffin bin Haji Akip
Kampong Tanah Burok	477	—N/a
Kampong Panchor Papan	358	Muhammad Adib bin Pehin Datu Indera Setia Mejar Jeneral (B) Dato Paduka Seri Haji Sulaiman
Kampong Panchor Dulit	478	Muhammad Adib bin Pehin Datu Indera Setia Mejar Jeneral (B) Dato Paduka Seri Haji Sulaiman
Kampong Sengkarai	1,694	Abdul Aziz bin Haji Hamdan
Kampong Penabai	749	Muhammad Sofiyuddin bin Mohammad Serudin
Kampong Kuala Tutong	238	Muhammad Sofiyuddin bin Mohammad Serudin
Kampong Serambangun	502	—N/a
Kampong Kandang	300	—N/a

== Notable people ==
- Abu Bakar Jambol (1897–1976), civil servant and community leader
