= Hassanal Bolkiah Mosque =

Mosque in Tutong, Brunei

- Masjid Hassanal Bolkiah
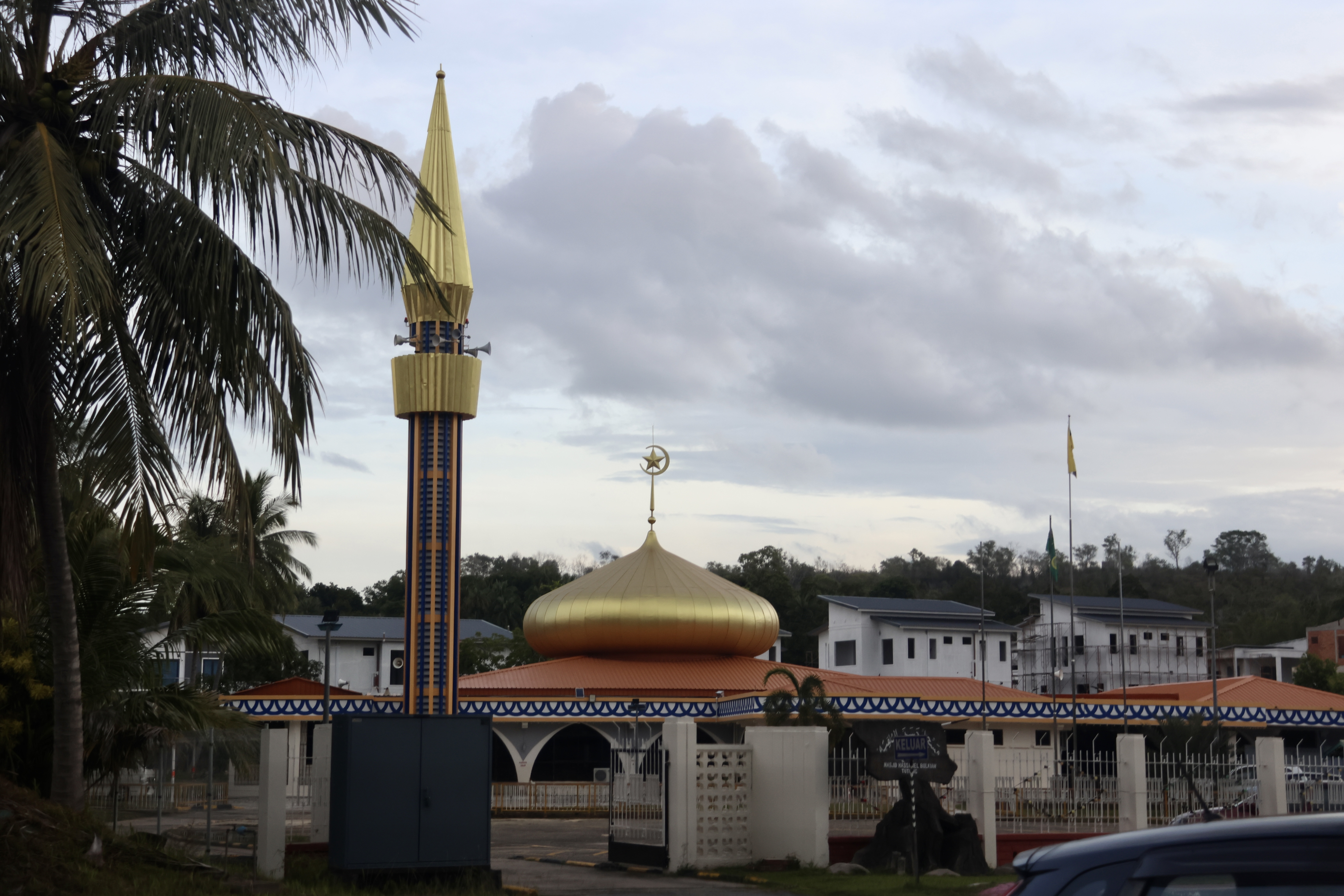
- The mosque in 2024

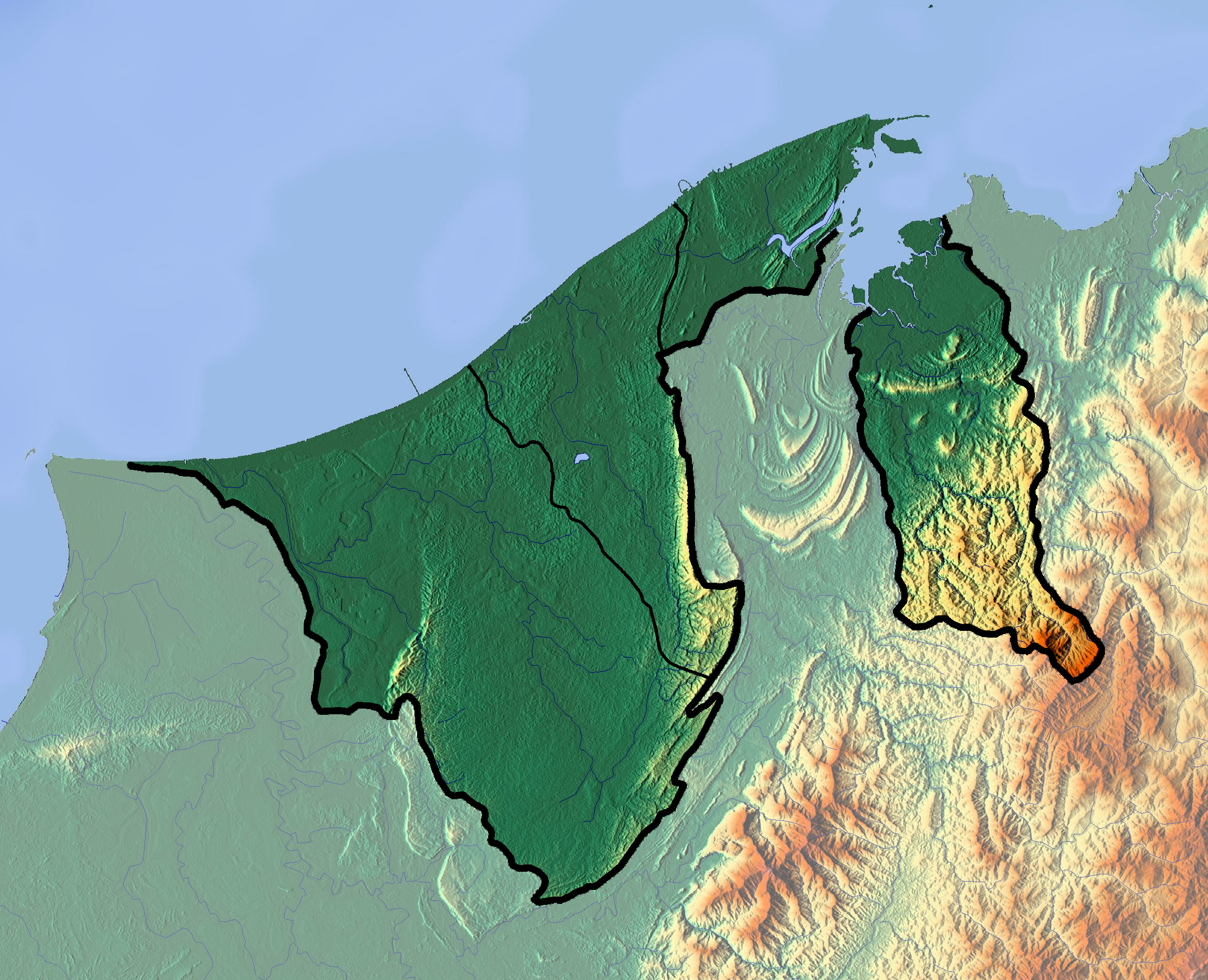
- Location of the mosque in Brunei

Religion
- Affiliation: Sunni Islam
- Ownership: Government of Brunei
- Governing body: Department of Mosque Affairs (Note: Every mosque in the country is governed by the Department of Mosque Affairs of the Ministry of Religious Affairs.)
- Status: Active

Location
- Location: Kampong Panchor Dulit, Tutong District
- Country: Brunei
- Interactive map of Hassanal Bolkiah Mosque
- Coordinates: 4°48′23.2″N 114°39′43.6″E

Architecture
- Type: mosque
- Style: Islamic architecture
- Groundbreaking: 17 April 1965
- Completed: 1966
- Construction cost: B$700,000

Specifications
- Capacity: 1,000 worshipers
- Dome: 1
- Minaret: 1
- Site area: 2.2357 acres (0.9048 ha)

Hassanal Bolkiah Mosque, Pekan Tutong (Malay: Masjid Hassanal Bolkiah, Pekan Tutong) or unofficially Hassanal Bolkiah Mosque, is a Sunni mosque located about 1 kilometre (0.62 mi) from Tutong, the town of Tutong District in Brunei. The mosque was opened in 1966; and it could hold up to 1,000 worshipers and has amenities like a library, a multipurpose hall, and a chamber for burial preparations.

== History ==
Built in 1922 on the location of stores No. 3 and 4 in the town's first shophouse block, the first mosque was quickly abandoned. Then, on what is now a bus and taxi stand, a second mosque was built in front of the Tutong River. A third mosque was constructed as a replacement in 1928 near the banks of the Tutong River. However, during World War II, the Allied air strikes have destroyed this mosque. To accommodate the expanding community, a fourth mosque—much larger than its predecessors—was built in 1950. Even this mosque was no longer enough by the 1960s, so a much larger one was built instead.

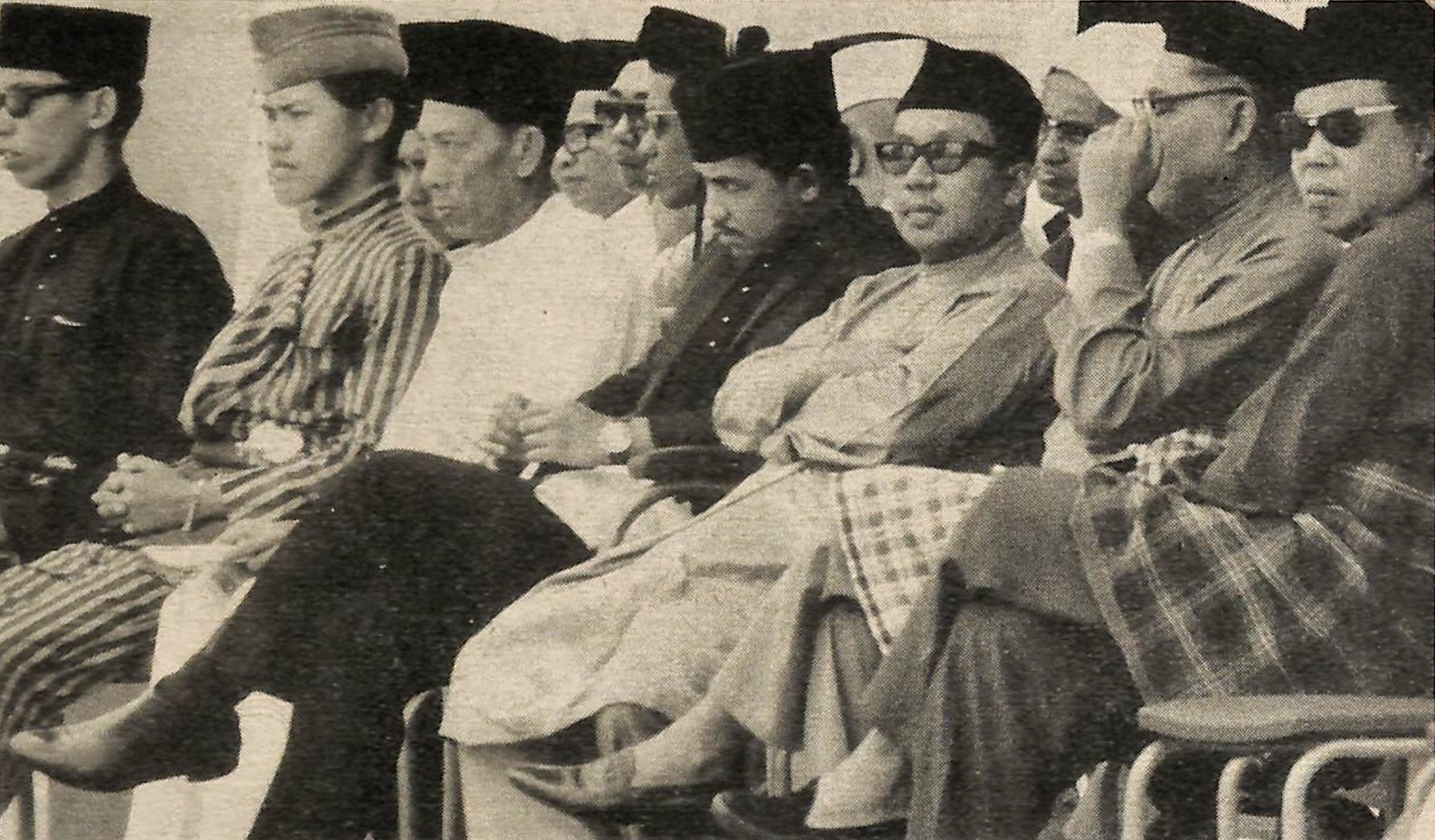
Hassanal Bolkiah (fourth from the left) during the mosque's inauguration ceremony on 26 August 1966

The construction of the Hassanal Bolkiah Mosque, situated on a 2.2357 acres (0.9048 ha) site, commenced on 17 April 1965 and was completed by mid-1966, at an estimated cost of B$700,000. The land for the mosque was generously donated as wakaf by Abdul Latif bin Khataf and Mohd. Daud bin Bujang. On the morning of Friday, 9th Jamadilawal 1386 (26 August 1966), the mosque was officially inaugurated by the then-Crown Prince Hassanal Bolkiah. At the time, it had a capacity to accommodate up to 700 worshippers. During the opening ceremony, the Crown Prince expressed his appreciation to the committee responsible for organising the event and to Pengiran Anak Kemaluddin, the State Religious Affairs Officer, for inviting him to inaugurate the mosque, which was named in his honour.

In mid-2016, Hassanal Bolkiah Mosque's golden jubilee celebrations began with a 50-Time Tedarus Al-Quran ritual, officiated by the director of Mosque Affairs. The event featured the recitation of Surah Al-Baqarah, a mass Maghrib prayer, Sunnat Hajat prayer, and concluded with a doa selamat. Distinguished guests included the Takmir's committee advisor and the Tutong District's religious head officer. The main celebration was scheduled for late August, accompanied by events such as a charity walkathon and a cleanup drive. Later, on 7 October, the jubilee was marked with a Khatam Al-Quran assembly, attended by Badaruddin Othman and Abdul Mokti.

== Gallery ==
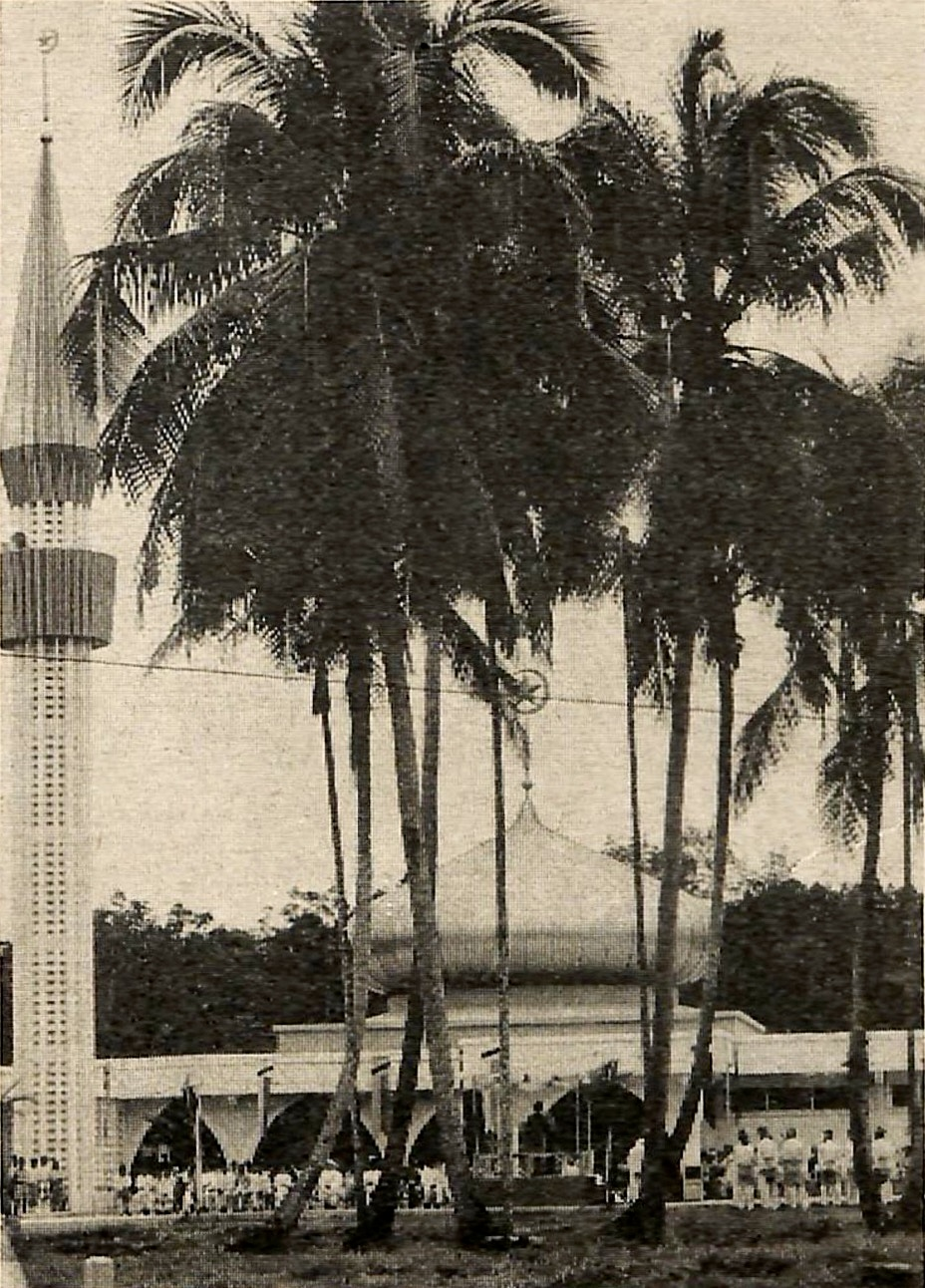
The mosque in 1966

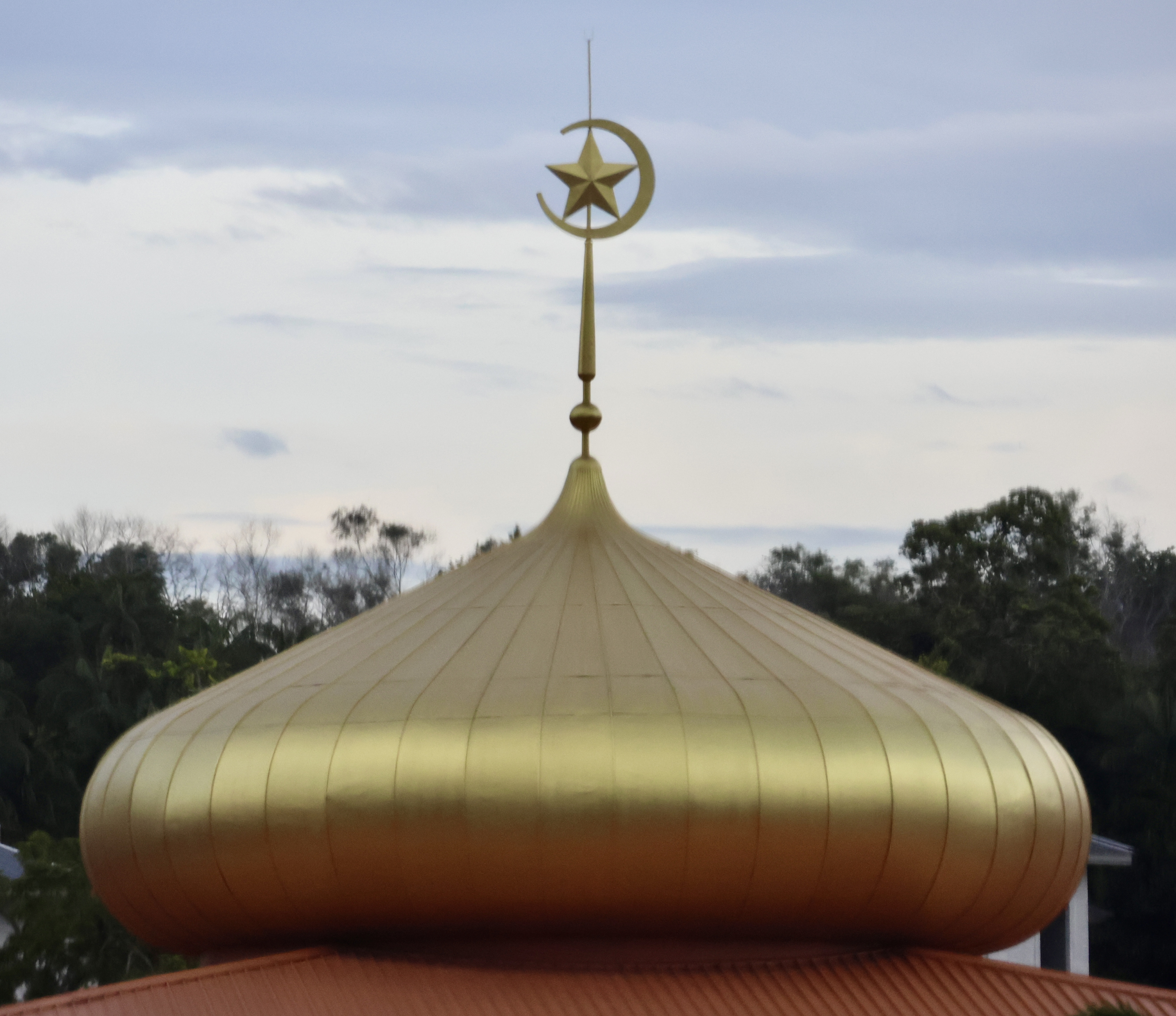
Close-up of the mosque's dome

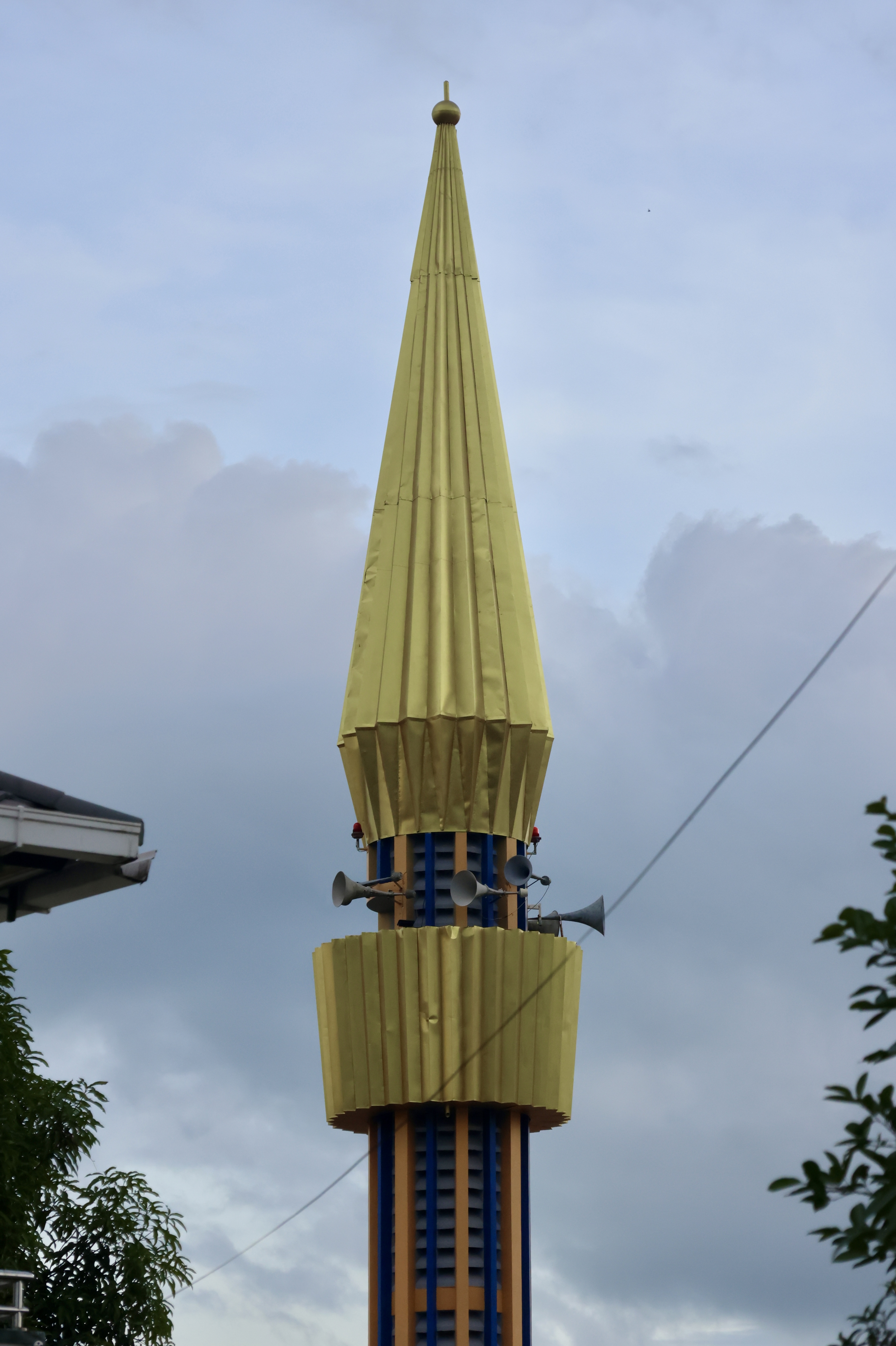
Close-up of the mosque's minaret

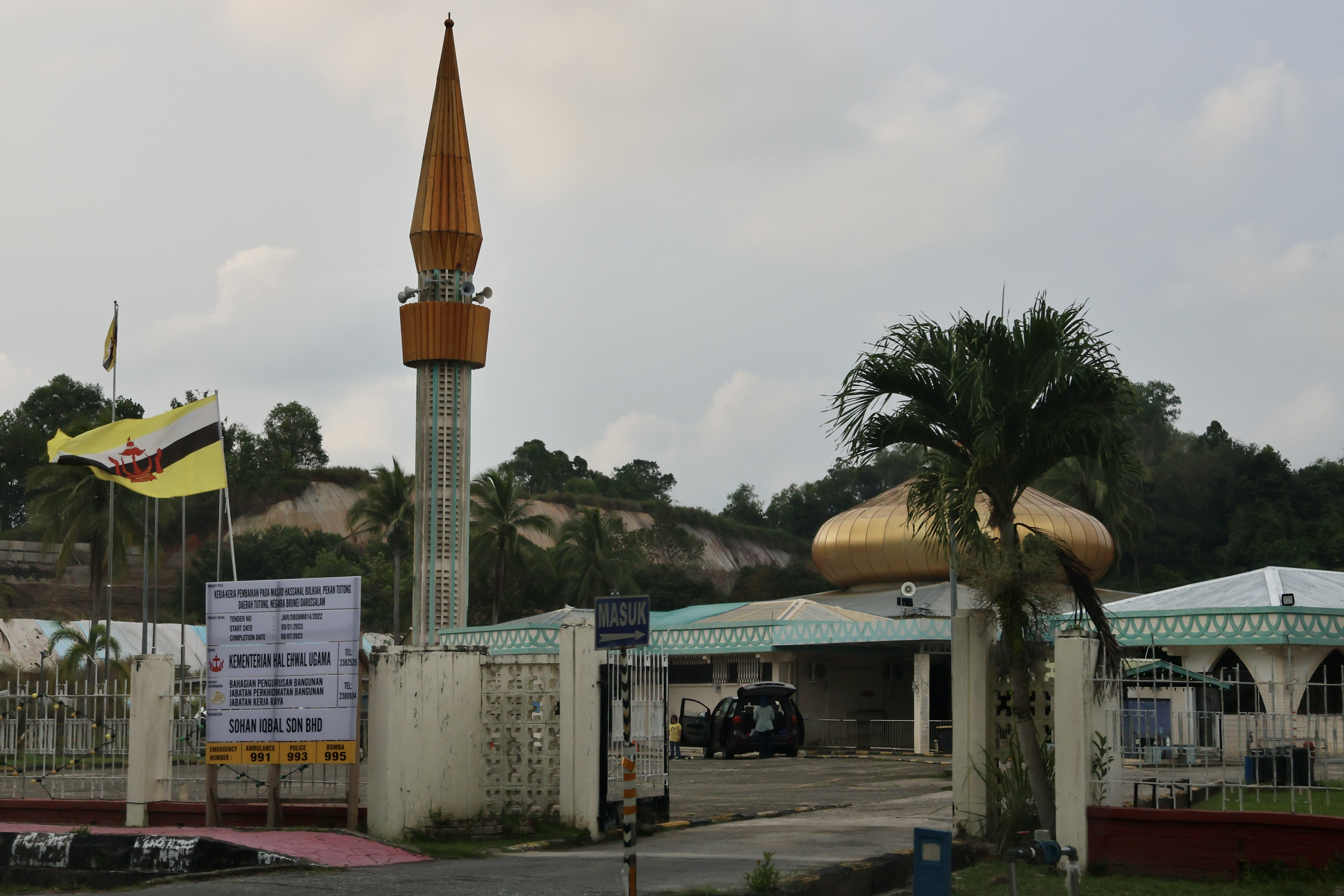
The mosque undergoing repairs in 2023

== See also ==
- List of mosques in Brunei
- Islam in Brunei
