= Muara–Tutong Highway =

Highway in Brunei

Coordinates: 4.056992°N 114.7988543°E

Muara–Tutong Highway Malay: Lebuhraya Muara–Tutong

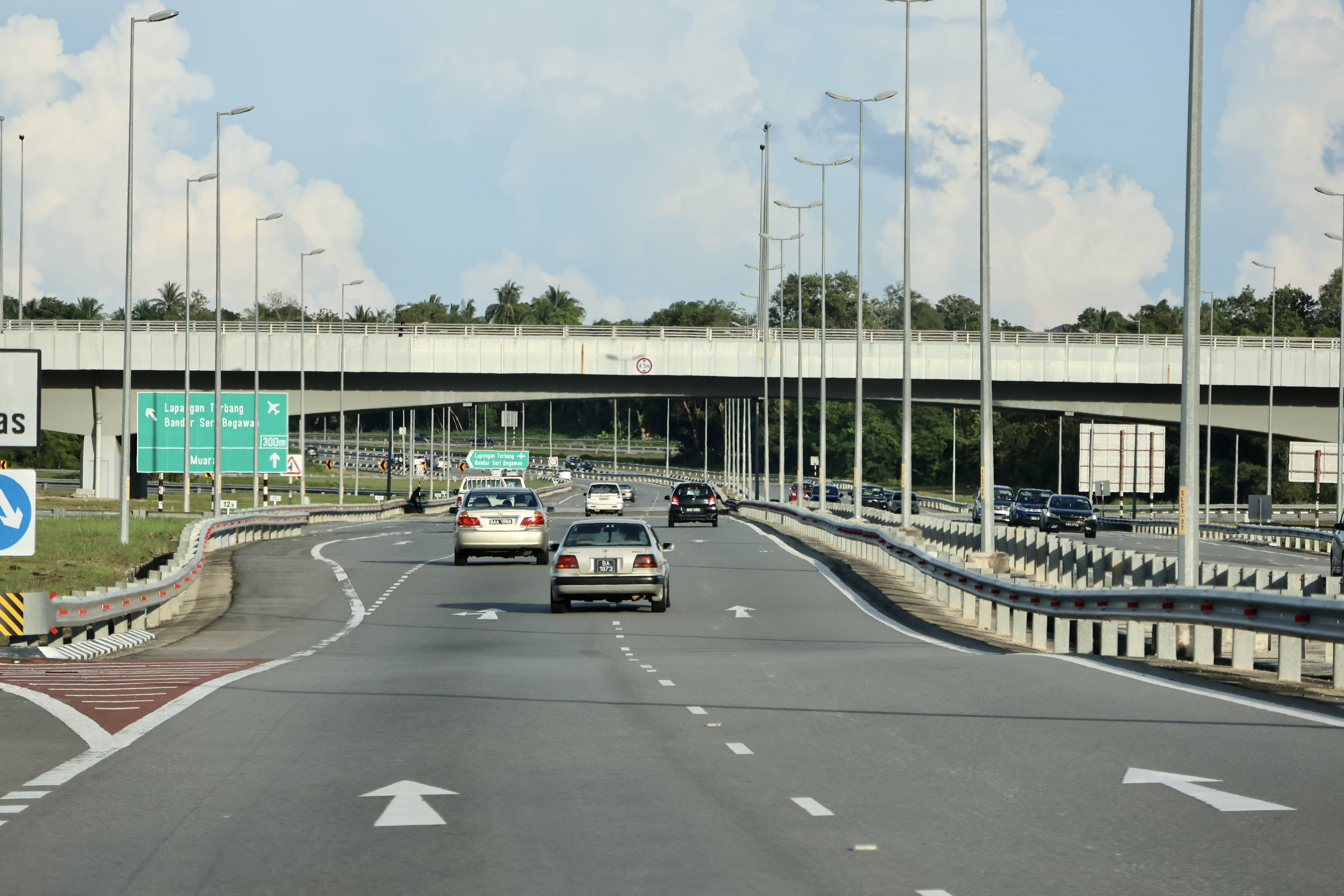

Route information
- Part of AH150

Major junctions
- Northeast end: Muara
- Tungku Highway
- Southwest end: Tutong

Location
- Country: Brunei
- Villages: Jerudong, Berakas

Highway system
- Brunei National Roads System

Muara–Tutong Highway, (Malay: Lebuhraya Muara–Tutong; Jawi: لبوهراي موارا - توتوڠ) is a major, inter-district highway in Brunei, and is the main road connecting the Brunei Muara and Tutong districts. It is sometimes referred to as the coastal highway due to it being mostly parallel to the coastline of Brunei. The highway is a controlled-access highway for most of its length west of the interchange with the Tungku Highway, until Kampong Tanjong Menugan, just east of Tutong. The remained of the highway is still a dual carriageway limited-access road, with left-in/left-out intersections being the most common type of intersection throughout the route.

== Speed limits ==
The general speed limit for the entire stretch of the highway is 100 km/h. This limit is reduced to 70 km/h during rain. Exceptions to this are

- The stretch from kilometre 32 to 34.7 has a speed limit of 70 km/h at all times.

== Junction list ==
Intersection names are conjectural and unofficial. Kilometre readings are measured from Muara town centre, 2.4 km from the start of the highway.

Concurrency terminus Closed/Former Incomplete access Unopened

- I/C - interchange, I/S - intersection (at-grade), R/O - roundabout (at-grade)

District	County	Location	KM	Intersection	Destinations	Remarks
Brunei-Muara	Serasa	Sabun	2.4	Muara R/O	Jalan Muara: Muara, Serasa, Kota Batu, Tanah Jambu, Salambigar, Mentiri, Bandar Seri Begawan; Simpang 172 Jalan Muara	
Brunei-Muara	Serasa	Meragang		Simpang 240-86 Jalan Muara		Southwest-bound only
Brunei-Muara	Serasa	Meragang	3.8	Meragang Beach I/S	Unnamed Road: Meragang Beach	Northeast-bound only
Brunei-Muara	Serasa	Tanah Jambu		I/S	Jalan Binglu: Tanah Jambu National Housing, Meragang National Housing	Southwest-bound only
Brunei-Muara	Serasa	Tanah Jambu	12.1	Tanah Jambu I/S	Jalan Utama Tanah Jambu: STKRJ Tanah Jambu, Salambigar Industrial Estate, Tanah Jambu, Salambigar	Southwest-bound only
Brunei-Muara	Berakas B	Lambak	15.1	Lambak Kanan I/S	Jalan Utama Berakas: Lambak Kanan Housing & Industrial Estates, Salambigar, Tanah Jambu, Madang, Manggis, Brunei International Airport, Bandar Seri Begawan	Has traffic lights
Brunei-Muara	Berakas B	Lambak	15.9	Lambak Kiri I/S	Jalan Pasir Berakas: Lambak Kiri, STKRJ Lambak Kiri, Berakas Garrison	Northeast-bound only
Brunei-Muara	Berakas B	Lambak	15.9	Lambak I/S	Jalan Pasir Berakas: Lambak	Southwest-bound only
Brunei-Muara	Berakas B	Lambak		I/S	Simpang 637-84-95: STKRJ Lambak Kiri	Northeast-bound only
Brunei-Muara	Berakas B	Lambak		Rimba I/S	Rimba Highway: Terunjing, Rimba National Housing, STKRJ Rimba, Tungku	Southwest-bound only
Brunei-Muara	Berakas B	Lambak		Berakas Reserve I/S	Unnamed Road: Berakas Forest Reserve	Northeast-bound only
Brunei-Muara	Gadong A	Tungku Beach		University I/S	Jalan Universiti: Universiti Brunei Darussalam, Universiti Teknologi Brunei	Southwest-bound only
Brunei-Muara	Gadong A	Tungku Beach	24.3	Tungku I/C	Tungku Highway: Universiti Brunei Darussalam, Rimba, Tungku, Gadong, Brunei International Airport, Kiarong, Beribi, Bandar Seri Begawan	
Brunei-Muara	Gadong A	Tungku Beach	25.7	Tungku Beach I/S	Unnamed Road: Tungku Beach	Northeast-bound only
Brunei-Muara	Sengkurong	Jerudong	27.7	Jerudong East I/C	Unnamed Road: The Empire Hotel & Country Club	
Brunei-Muara	Sengkurong	Jerudong	28.5	Shahbandar 1 I/S	Unnamed Road: Bukit Shahbandar Recreational Park	Southwest-bound only
Brunei-Muara	Sengkurong	Jerudong	28.7	Shahbandar 2 I/S	Unnamed Road: Bukit Shahbandar Observatory	Southwest-bound only
Brunei-Muara	Sengkurong	Jerudong	29.6	Jerudong I/C	AH150 Jalan Jerudong: Jerudong Beach, Jerudong, Sengkurong, Mulaut, Tanjung Bunut, Kuala Lurah, Lamunin	Eastern terminus of AH150 concurrency
Brunei-Muara	Sengkurong	Jerudong	31.1	Jerudong West I/C	Unnamed Road: Jerudong Park, Jerudong Park Medical Centre	
Tutong	Keriam	Ikas		Binturan 1 I/S	Unnamed Road: Binturan Firing Range	
Tutong	Keriam	Bukit Panggal	49.9	Bukit Panggal I/S	Jalan Bukit Panggal (southwest-bound exit only): Bukit Panggal, Luagan Dudok, Sinaut, Lamunin; Jalan Bukit Panggal (northeast-bound exit only): Bukit Panggal	South section: southwest-bound route only; north section: northeast-bound route only
Tutong	Keriam	Bukit Panggal	50.8	Binturan 2 I/S	Unnamed Road: Penanjong Garrison	Enter to northeast-bound route only
Tutong	Pekan Tutong	Tanah Burok	55.6	Penanjong I/C	Jalan Tutong: Keriam, Panchor Papan, Tutong, Luagan Dudok, Bukit Panggal, Sinaut, Lamunin; Jalan Penanjong: Penanjong, Binturan	
Tutong	Pekan Tutong	Panchor Papan	57.0	Sungai Basong I/S	Jalan Sungai Basong: Sungai Basong Recreational Park, Tutong Hospital, Panchor Papan, Tutong; Jalan Padang: Tutong Garrison	Has traffic lights
Tutong	Pekan Tutong	Panchor Papan	57.7	Sungai Besar I/S	Jalan Sungai Besar: Tutong Hospital, Tutong	Southwest-bound route only
Tutong	Pekan Tutong	Sengkarai		Simpang 181 Muara–Tutong Highway		Northeast-bound route only
Tutong	Pekan Tutong	Sengkarai	59.1	Suran I/S	Unnamed Road: Suran, Panchor Papan, Tutong	Southwest-bound route only
Tutong	Pekan Tutong	Sengkarai	60.6	Tutong I/S	Jalan Tutong: Tutong, Keriam, Sinaut, Lamunin; Jalan Kuala Tutong: Sengkarai, Penabai, Kuala Tutong	Western terminus of AH150 concurrency
Continues as AH150 Tutong–Telisai Highway
