= Mentiri National Housing Area 'A' =

Mentiri National Housing Area 'A' Perumahan Negara Mentiri Kawasan 'A'
- Village
- Kampong Mentiri National Housing Scheme Area 'A'
- Location in Brunei
- Coordinates: 4°58′03.0″N 115°02′02.7″E
- Country: Brunei
- District: Brunei-Muara
- Subdistrict: Mentiri

Government
  - Village head: Pengiran Aliuddin Pengiran Damit
- Postcode: BU2129

Mentiri National Housing Area 'A' (Malay: Perumahan Negara Mentiri Kawasan 'A') or Mentiri National Housing Area 1 (Malay: Perumahan Negara Mentiri Kawasan 1) is a village administrative division in Brunei-Muara District of Brunei. It is a village subdivision of the mukim or subdistrict of Mentiri. As a village, it is headed by a ketua kampung or village head, and the incumbent is Pengiran Aliuddin bin Pengiran Damit. It is also a designated postcode area with the postcode BU2129.

== Geography ==
Mentiri National Housing Area 'A' is located in the eastern part of Brunei-Muara District. It borders the village subdivisions of Batu Marang to the north, Mentiri National Housing Area 'B' to the west, Mentiri to the southwest and Pangkalan Sibabau to the south. It also borders the Brunei Bay along its eastern border.

== See also ==
- Mentiri National Housing Area 'B'
- National Housing Scheme
