= Mentiri National Housing Area 'B' =

Mentiri National Housing Area 'B' Perumahan Negara Mentiri Kawasan 'B'
- Village
- Kampong Mentiri National Housing Scheme Area 'B'
- Location in Brunei
- Coordinates: 4°58′14.1″N 115°01′35.0″E
- Country: Brunei
- District: Brunei-Muara
- Subdistrict: Mentiri

Government
  - Village head: Pengiran Ibrahim Pengiran Hidup
- Postcode: BU2229

Mentiri National Housing Area 'B' (Malay: Perumahan Negara Mentiri Kawasan 'B') or Mentiri National Housing Area 2 (Malay: Perumahan Negara Mentiri Kawasan 2) is a village administrative division of Brunei-Muara District, Brunei. It is a village subdivision under the mukim or subdistrict of Mentiri. As a village subdivision, it is headed by a ketua kampung or village head; the incumbent is Pengiran Ibrahim bin Pengiran Hidup. Mentiri National Housing Area 'B' is also a designated postcode area with the postcode BU2229.

== Geography ==
Mentiri National Housing Area 'B' is located in the north-eastern part of the Brunei-Muara District. It borders the village subdivisions of Batu Marang to the north, Mentiri National Housing Area 'A' to the east, Pangkalan Sibabau to the south and Mentiri to the west.

== See also ==
- Mentiri National Housing Area 'A'
- National Housing Scheme
