= Taha Abdul Rauf =

Bruneian teacher and legislative councillor (born 1933)

Orang Kaya Jaya Putera Dato Paduka Taha Abdul Rauf DPMB PSB PJK PIKB PKL
- تاه عبدالراوف
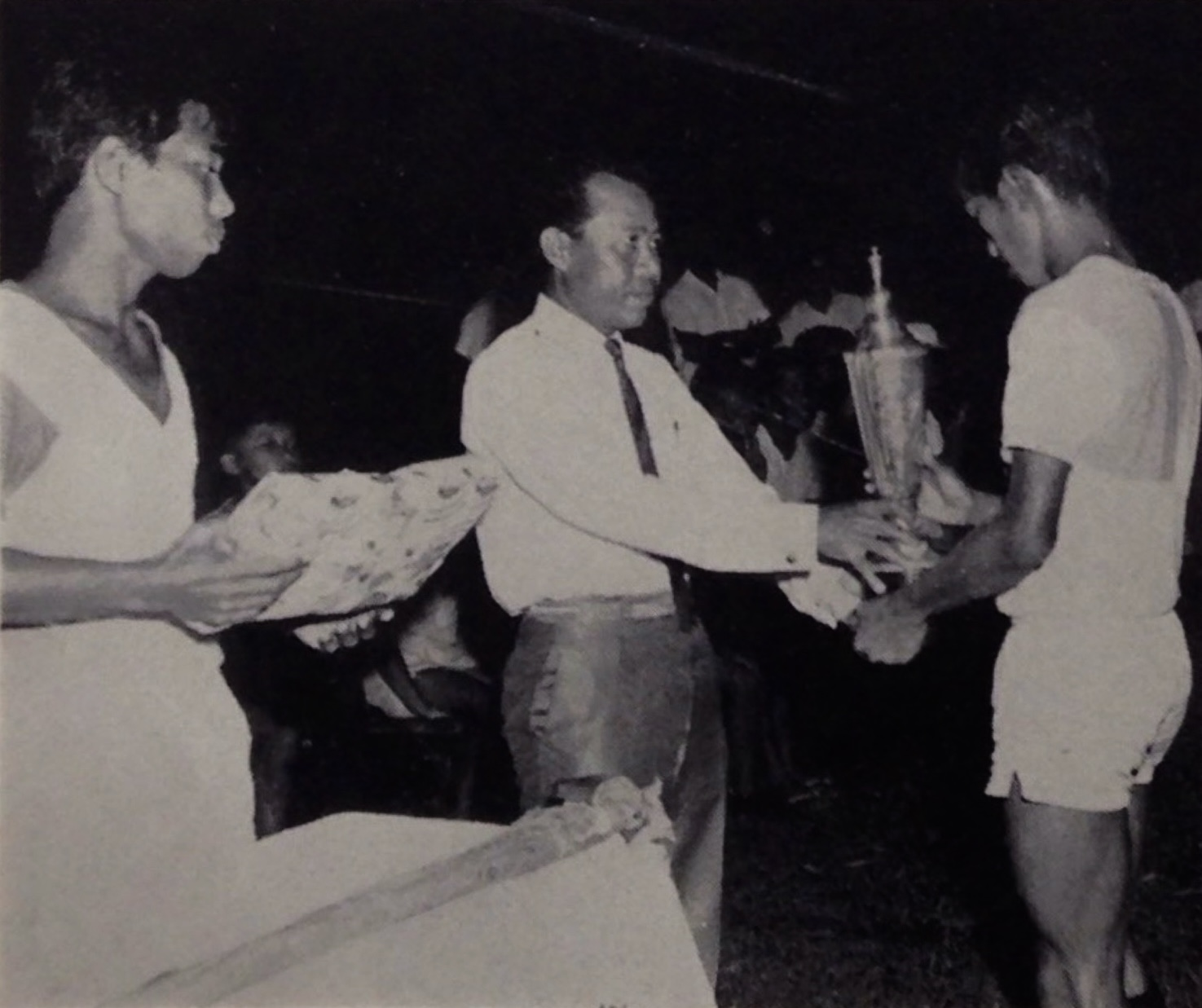
- Muhammad Taha (centre) in 1970

Member of the Legislative Council
- In office 2 September 2005 – 13 January 2017

Personal details
- Born: 5 January 1933 (age 93) Kampong Keriam, Tutong, Brunei
- Occupation: Legislative councillor; teacher

Muhammad Taha bin Abdul Rauf (born 5 January 1933) is a retired Bruneian aristocrat, legislative councillor, and educator of Tutong descent. He is best known for his service as a member of the Legislative Council (LegCo) from 2005 to 2017 and his tenure as the penghulu of Mukim Keriam.

== Early career ==
Muhammad Taha served as the first headmaster of the Muda Hashim Malay School (SMMH) from 1968 to 1970. He presided over the certificate giving ceremony on 9 November 1969, at the school's hall. As the event's chairperson, he was instrumental in planning the celebration of the accomplishments of students who passed the Lower Certificate of Education exam.

== Political career ==
=== Legislative councillor (2005–2011) ===
Sultan Hassanal Bolkiah announced the appointment of new members to the LegCo, effective from 2 September 2005. The previous line-up was dissolved on 1 September. Among those appointed was Muhammad Taha, who brings distinguished service and contributions to the deliberations of the LegCo.

=== Legislative councillor (2011–2017) ===
On 28 March 2011, Muhammad Taha was appointed by the sultan as a member of the LegCo under the district representative category. Representing Zone 1 in the Tutong District, Mohammad Taha expressed his gratitude to the sultan on 1 June 2011 for re-appointing him as a district representative. He pledged to focus on highlighting the key issues affecting his area and committed to ensuring that all relevant concerns would be debated in the LegCo for the benefit of his community.

==== 9th LegCo session ====
During the 9th LegCo session, Muhammad Taha contributed to the development of cultural and national issues in Brunei. Muhammad Taha demanded a revision of Brunei's rubber plantation policy on 1 April 2013, arguing that fresh projects would help bring the industry back to life. However, citing environmental concerns, Yahya Bakar, the Minister of Industry and Primary Resources, rejected the proposal. He clarified that expanding sugarcane and rubber plantations could have a detrimental effect on the environment because rubber crops are prone to diseases like root disease, which has impacted plantations in Malaysia. The minister also noted that the market value of natural rubber was declining due to competition from synthetic rubber. Given the restricted amount of land available for plantations, he said the ministry would give priority to important products like rice, fruits, and vegetables and would not back projects that would cultivate sugarcane or rubber because of the possible environmental hazards.

On 20 March 2013, he proposed the establishment of a "Language Year" to further support the Malay language, suggesting that year-round efforts should be made to enhance awareness and revitalise the language as a cultural asset, replacing the traditional Bulan Bahasa (Language Month). His suggestion highlighted the importance of ongoing initiatives beyond a specific month. The Minister of Culture, Youth and Sports, Hazair Abdullah, agreed with the proposal and stressed the significance of continuing efforts across schools, colleges, and private sectors to promote the language. Additionally, Muhammad Taha was involved in discussions regarding the standardisation of Jawi script and the consideration of a national library, although financial constraints hindered its prioritisation.

Muhammad Taha also raised concerns about local infrastructure and services. On 21 March 2013, he questioned the progress of nine projects that had been allocated funding, prompting a response from Suyoi Osman, the Minister of Development, who assured that these projects would be completed within the allocated timeframes. The minister also addressed issues related to road upgrades and traffic congestion, including improvements to key roads like the Bandar Seri Begawan–Tutong and Sengkurong–Tutong routes.

On the same day, Muhammad Taha voiced concerns about the lengthy land division and measurement process, which he believed could take years. He called for prioritising applications related to house building to expedite the process. Minister Suyoi Osman explained that delays often resulted from noncompliance with land laws, disputes between landowners, and slow completion of necessary paperwork by applicants. He promised that the internal issues within the Department of Survey would be examined to improve efficiency.

Further, on 25 March 2013, Muhammad Taha raised concerns about the inadequate and unclear Datastream Digital network coverage in his constituency, specifically in Kampong Sinaut and Birau. He urged for immediate improvements to service quality in these areas. Later that day, he also expressed worries about the closure of businesses during Friday prayers and its impact on port services, especially for international clients. In response, Abdullah Bakar, the Minister of Communications, assured that stores outside the main area would remain open, and critical services, such as immigration and customs, would continue without disruption.

==== 10th LegCo session ====
During the 10th LegCo session, on 13 March 2014, Minister Hazair addressed Muhammad Taha's concerns about the Tabung Amanah Pekerja (TAP). He assured that TAP would continue to carefully evaluate investment opportunities to safeguard contributors' funds. In addition to adhering to Islamic compliance regulations, which prohibit investments in sectors like alcohol or pork, he explained that TAP's investments primarily consist of stocks, bonds, and fixed deposits. The minister highlighted that TAP withdrawals are governed by legislation, but acknowledged that some members may face financial challenges, particularly regarding withdrawals for Hajj. While contributions in Brunei are relatively low compared to other countries, he assured that TAP would consider introducing more flexible withdrawal options without impacting retirement benefits.

On 17 March 2014, Minister of Home Affairs, Badaruddin Othman, addressed various issues during the LegCo session. He clarified the distinction between stateless permanent residents, who are entitled to benefits such as school fee exemptions, and foreign nationals. He also responded to Muhammad Taha's concerns about the use of foreign workers in the Kuala Belait and Seria Municipal Boards, stating that the issue would be evaluated. Regarding the ethnic classification in the yellow identity card, the minister explained that "Malay" was added to unify identities, not erase them. He introduced the long-term residential pass for foreign business and professional residents to attract investment while maintaining demographic balance. On housing for the poor, he noted that it is funded by charity rather than the government. He concluded by reassuring that labor laws protect worker rights, including wages and working hours.

On 18 March 2014, Muhammad Taha expressed his hope that the Science Secondary School in Kampong Kupang, would proceed according to the 10th National Development Plan's schedule, aiming for completion by 2017. He also advocated for the establishment of Institut Teknologi Brunei (ITB) in Tutong by 2035. Minister of Education, Abu Bakar Apong, confirmed that the school project was included in the plan and would proceed following further considerations. He also noted that ITB now offers more than just engineering programs. Additionally, the minister assured that school facilities would be made available to local communities, with safety and cleanliness protocols, after Muhammad Taha raised concerns about youth access to sports fields at Raja Isteri Pengiran Anak Saleha School and Keriam Primary School.

==== 12th LegCo session ====
During the 12th LegCo session, Mohammad Taha demonstrated a strong commitment to addressing key issues affecting Brunei's economy and society. On 7 March 2016, he underscored the importance of fostering partnerships between international investors and the local private sector to diversify the nation's revenue streams beyond oil and gas. He highlighted the need to provide skilled individuals with opportunities to contribute to these businesses and endorsed the Sultan's call for LegCo members to take more proactive measures to resolve community issues, both in urban and rural areas.

On 10 March 2016, Muhammad Taha raised concerns about the decline of cooperatives in Brunei, attributing it to poor management and low productivity. He recommended collaboration with Japanese and Malaysian cooperatives, ongoing training, and cooperative development programs to boost efficiency. Yasmin Umar, the Minister of Energy and Industry responded by detailing government initiatives to strengthen cooperatives, especially those led by youth, through training and partnerships with ANGKASA to foster collaborative growth and business development.

In subsequent sessions, Muhammad Taha continued to engage with various issues. On 14 March 2016, he proposed Tasek Merimbun as a potential tourist destination, advocating for careful development to preserve its historic features. The Minister of Primary Resources and Tourism acknowledged this, emphasizing the prioritisation of well-established tourist destinations. On 16 March 2016, he raised questions about the Old Age Pension, pressing for better support for senior citizens. Halbi Mohd Yussof, the Minister of Culture, Youth, and Sports explained the current pension structure and additional support for those in need, ensuring the safety of pension disbursement.

On 19 March 2016, Muhammad Taha addressed the issue of vehicle inspections, suggesting the involvement of the private sector to reduce waiting times and costs. The Minister of Communications responded by outlining plans to collaborate with private companies to maintain vehicle standards while regulating the service. Muhammad Taha's tenure in the LegCo concluded on 13 January 2017 with the appointment of new legislative councillors.

== Other works ==
The new Telekom Brunei branch in Petani Mall in Tutong, which took the place of the old TelBru Tutong branch, was officially opened on 8 May 2015, by Muhammad Taha. TelBru's efforts to improve customer service, especially for residents of the Tutong District, included this project. In addition to providing a broadband clinic to help clients with technical problems, the new branch offers extended business hours and a variety of services, including bill payment and new service applications. The occasion demonstrated Taha's dedication to enhancing community infrastructure and public services.

At the opening of the Tutong District Ethnic Heritage, Arts, and Culture Day at Sungai Basong Recreational Park on 2 November 2015, Mohammad Taha underlined the tourism and sustainable economic potential spearheaded by the Tutong District Office. In line with Wawasan Brunei 2035, he commended the community's robust support and involvement in promoting harmony and well-being. Students, educational institutions, foreign embassies, and the general public were all very interested in the first event, which highlighted the traditional ways of life and distinctive cultural legacy of different ethnic groups.

Muhammad Taha officiated the 50th anniversary ceremony of Muda Hashim Secondary School, Tutong on 20 June 2021.

== Personal life ==
In an attempt to fortify the already-existing familial bonds, Muhammad Taha's family organised a doa selamat and gratitude ceremony on 5 January 2021. His 88th birthday was celebrated with the event, which was hosted at his home in Kampong Keriam.

== Titles, styles and honours ==
=== Titles and styles ===
Muhammad Taha holds the Manteri Bertauliah title of Orang Kaya Jaya Putera, styled as Yang Mulia.

=== Awards ===
Muhammad Taha received the Meritorious Teacher's Award at the 15th Teachers' Day Celebration, held on 25 September 2005. The award was presented by Crown Prince Al-Muhtadee Billah. On 23 June 2024, Muhammad Taha, a long-standing member of Brunei Malay Teachers Association (PGGMB), was honoured with the Anugerah Ahli Tertua PGGMB 2024 in recognition of his continued membership since 1967. At 91 years old, he was celebrated for his significant contribution to the federation, which plays a crucial role in enhancing the teaching profession and education in Brunei.

- Meritorious Teacher's Award (2005)
- Anugerah Ahli Tertua PGGMB (2024)

=== Honours ===
Throughout his career, he has earned the following awards and honours:

- Order of Seri Paduka Mahkota Brunei Second Class (DPMB) – Dato Paduka
- Order of Seri Paduka Mahkota Brunei Third Class (SMB)
- Order of Setia Negara Brunei Fourth Class (PSB)
- Meritorious Service Medal (PJK)
- Excellent Service Medal (PIKB)
- Long Service Medal (PKL)
