= Kampong Luagan Dudok =

- Village
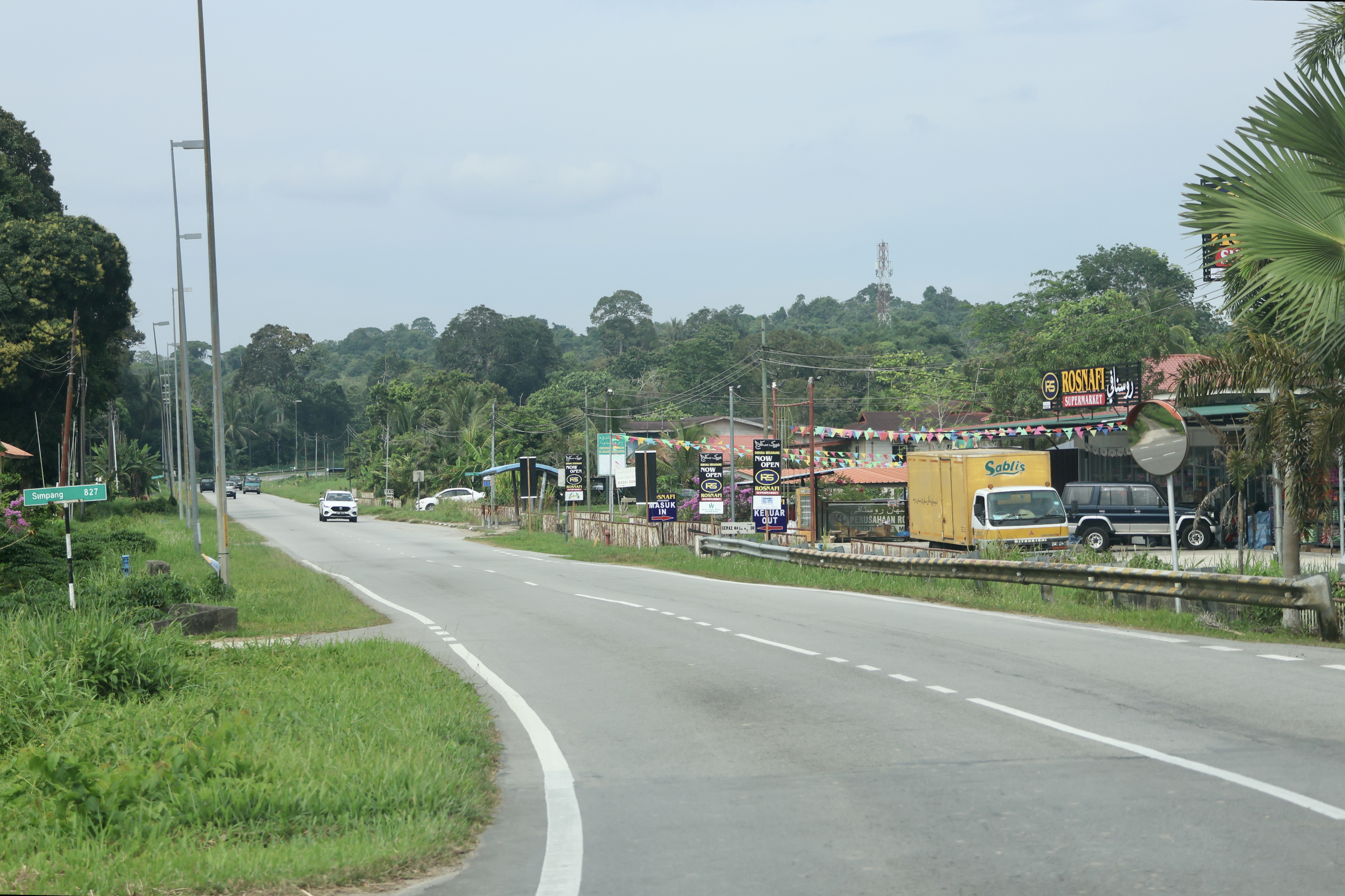

- Location in Brunei
- Coordinates: 4°48′59″N 114°43′39″E
- Country: Brunei
- District: Tutong
- Mukim: Keriam

Government
  - Village head: Dandarawi Nasar

Population (2016)
  - Total: 879
- Time zone: UTC+8 (BNT)
- Postcode: TB1541

Kampong Luagan Dudok is a village in the north-east of Tutong District, Brunei. The population was 879 in 2016. It is one of the villages within Mukim Keriam, mukim in the district.

== Geography ==
The village neighbours Kampong Bukit Panggal to the north, Kampong Sinaut to the east, and Kampong Keriam to the west. It is one of the settlements along Jalan Tutong, an important road which connects the district's town Pekan Tutong to the country's capital Bandar Seri Begawan. Access to the village is through Jalan Tutong via Kampong Sinaut from the east and Kampong Keriam from the west, as well as Jalan Bukit Panggal from the north via Kampong Bukit Panggal which gives direct access to Muara–Tutong Highway.

== Facilities ==
Haji Abdul Azim Mosque is the village mosque; the construction began in 1991 and completed in the following year. It can accommodate 800 worshippers. The mosque is named after Prince Abdul Azim, a son of Sultan Hassanal Bolkiah.

Dewan Kemasyarakatan Luagan Dudok is the village community centre.
