= RPN Kampong Mentiri =

Public housing estate in Brunei

RPN Kampong Mentiri Rancangan Perumahan Negara Kampung Mentiri
- Public housing estate
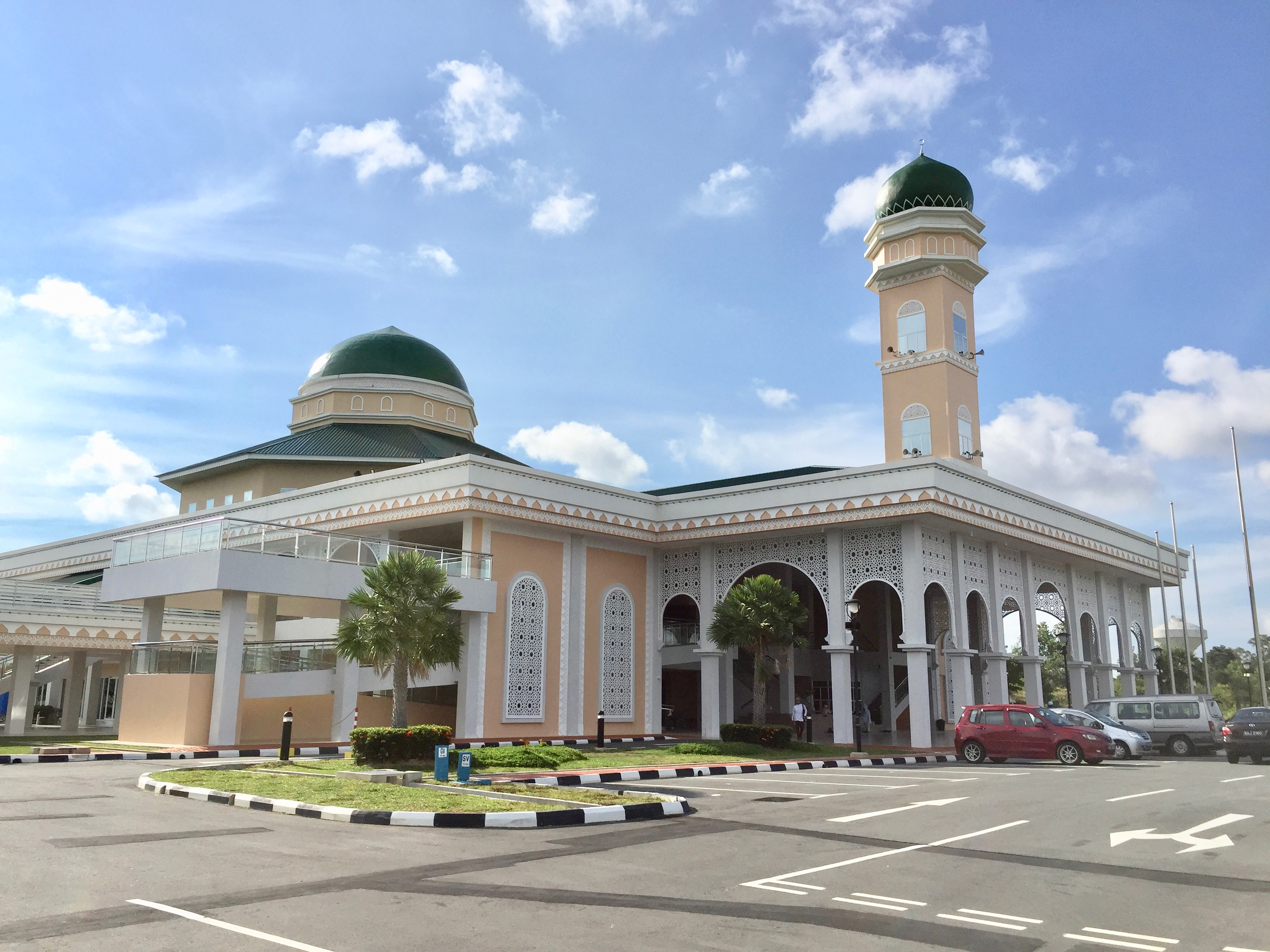
- Hassanal Bolkiah Mosque

- Location in Brunei
- Coordinates: 4°58′07″N 115°01′50″E
- Country: Brunei
- District: Brunei-Muara
- Mukim: Mentiri
- Sub-areas: Villages: RPN Kampong Mentiri Zone 1 & 2

Government
  - Village head: Abu Bakar Pungut (Area 1); Mohammad Nizam (Area 2)
- Postcodes: BU2129, BU2229

RPN Kampong Mentiri (Malay: Rancangan Perumahan Negara Kampung Mentiri) is a public housing estate near the village Kampong Mentiri in Brunei-Muara District, Brunei.

== Administration ==
For administrative purposes the area has been divided into, and established as, two village subdivisions:

Village	Population (2016)	Postcode
RPN Kampong Mentiri Zone 1	2,880	BU2129
RPN Kampong Mentiri Zone 2	3,081	BU2229

Both are villages within Mukim Mentiri.

== Infrastructure ==
=== Schools ===
- Pehin Datu Seri Maharaja Secondary School, which provides secondary education for the residents of the mukim of Mentiri
- Dato Mohd Yassin Primary School
- Dato Mohd Yassin Religious School

=== Mosque ===
Hassanal Bolkiah Mosque was opened in 2017 and it replaces the former Kampong Mentiri National Housing Scheme Mosque which was destroyed in a fire. The mosque was inaugurated by Sultan Hassanal Bolkiah, the Sultan of Brunei; it can accommodate 3,000 worshippers.

== See also ==
- Public housing in Brunei
