= Kampong Keriam =

Village in Brunei

Kampong Keriam Kampung Keriam
- Village
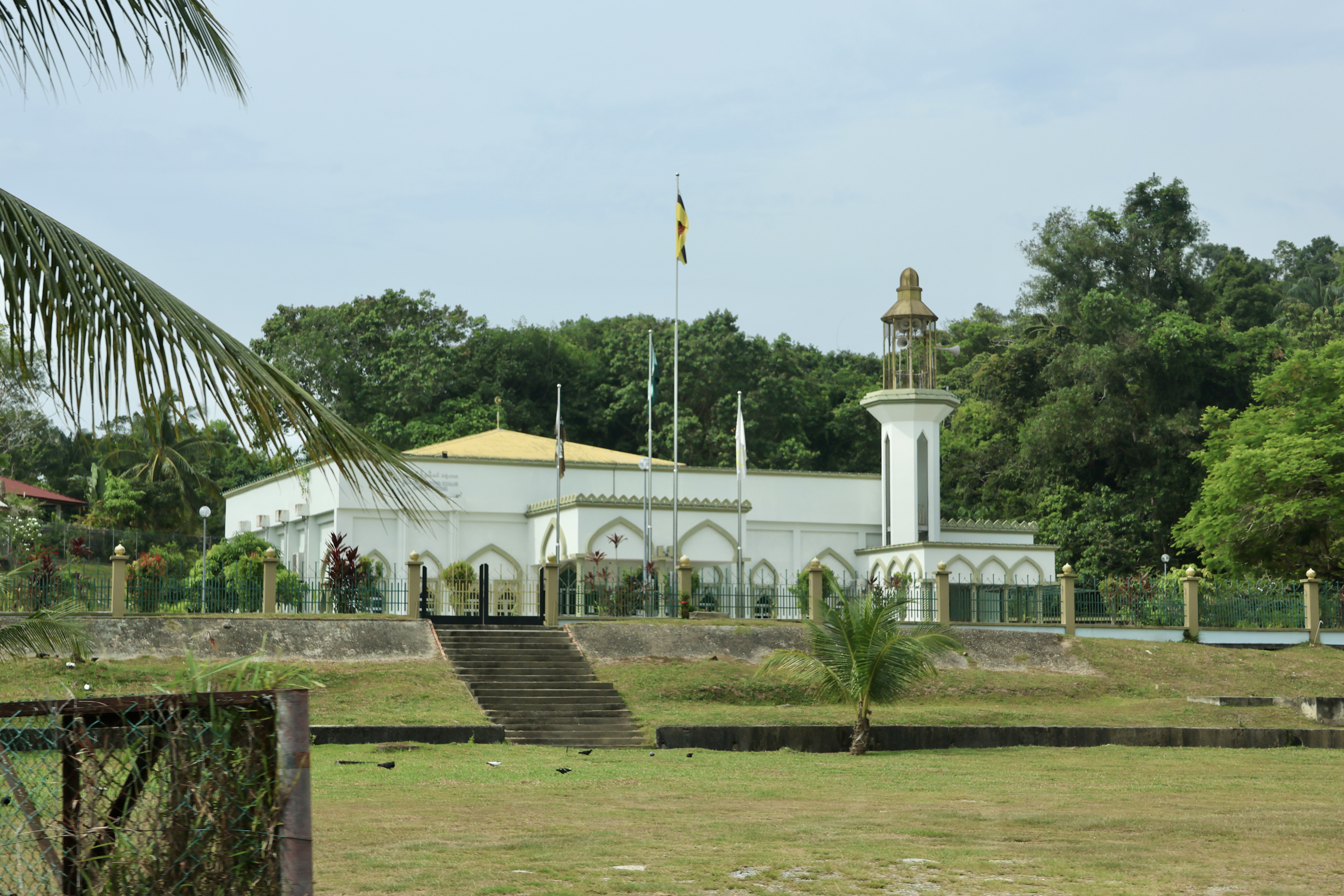
- Kampong Keriam Mosque

- Location in Brunei
- Coordinates: 4°48′59″N 114°41′35″E
- Country: Brunei
- District: Tutong
- Mukim: Keriam
- First settled: 1924

Government
  - Village head: Bahrin Bolhassan

Population (2021)
  - Total: 1,980
- Time zone: UTC+8 (BNT)
- Postcode: TB1141

Kampong Keriam (Malay: Kampung Keriam) is a village located in the Tutong District of Brunei, within the mukim of Keriam. Located approximately 2 kilometres (1.2 mi) from Tutong town, it had a population of 1,980 in 2021, predominantly comprising the Tutong ethnic group. Originally an area for paddy and rubber cultivation, it transformed into a village in 1924 when residents from nearby settlements, including Kampong Penanjong, Panchor Papan, Penampang, and Kelakas, relocated there. The village's growth was further supported by the development of the main road in the Tutong District during the 1920s, establishing it as a thriving residential area.

== Etymology ==
The village was originally named Kampong Si Rium, after a member of the Dusun ethnic group named Si Rium. He hailed from Kampong Sungai Bera in Belait District and relocated to Kampong Penampang in Tutong District with his wife, Jinah, due to difficulties in making a living in their hometown. Their lives improved after moving, especially when they were blessed with their first child. However, they were eventually forced to leave Kampong Penampang after a soothsayer warned them that their child would face danger from crocodiles. Concerned for his child's safety, Si Rium sought a safer place to live.

Si Rium eventually found a hill near a river, now known as Sungai Keriam, which he deemed suitable for settling, planting rice, and farming. After clearing the land and building a house, his family moved there. Si Rium continued his routine of fishing at sea, and each time, he would bring back a basket of sand to elevate and fortify the area around his home. Over time, his home became elevated and surrounded by sand.

One day, while his wife was cradling their child, an incident occurred that changed their lives. A "dumbak" (a crocodile skin container) stored near the sleeping area fell from a water jar and accidentally struck their child, causing the child to develop a mysterious illness. Several traditional healers attempted to cure the child, but all efforts failed, and the child eventually died. The village was formerly known by the name Kampong Karium or Si Rium; it was eventually 'standardised' in the Malay language to the present spelling "Keriam".

== Geography ==
The village neighbours Kampong Bukit Panggal to the north-east, Kampong Luagan Dudok to the east, Kampong Panchor Papan to the south-west, and Kampong Tanah Buruk and Kampong Penanjong to the north-west. It is one of the settlements along Jalan Tutong, a primary road which connects the district town Pekan Tutong to the capital Bandar Seri Begawan.

== History ==
In 1924, the area where Si Rium had settled began transforming into a Tutong village when residents from Kampong Penanjong, Panchor Papan, Penampang, and Kelakas relocated there to cultivate paddy and rubber trees. Initially, the area was referred to as "Si Rium's place" by the settlers, and the village consisted of only about ten houses. The construction of a main road in the 1920s significantly contributed to the village's growth and development.

In 1926, Pehin Orang Kaya Udana Laila Enche Awang, who was then the chief supervisor at the Public Works Department in Brunei Town, formally defined the village's boundaries. Bukit Dadap was established as the border between Kampong Si Rium and Kampong Luagan Dudok, while Sungai Kelakas marked the boundary with Kampong Panchor Papan. The following year, Enche Awang became the district officer of Tutong. During his tenure, he renamed Kampong Si Rium to Kampong Keriam, aiming to beautify and simplify its pronunciation. This renaming was also applied to Sungai Si Rium and Bukit Si Rium, further cementing the village's identity.

== Administration ==
The first ketua kampung (village head) of Kampong Keriam was Bendahari Ibrahim, who was succeeded by Orang Kaya Jaya Putra Haji Talip. Following the passing of Haji Talip, the position was taken over by Orang Kaya Setia Negara Awang Mohd. Safar bin Salleh, who also served as the penghulu of Mukim Keriam. He was later succeeded by Penghulu Awang Simpul bin Haji Latif. Subsequently, Awang Haji Metali bin Orang Kaya Jaya Putra Haji Talip was appointed as the village head of Kampong Keriam, a role he has held on 1 February 1977.

== Infrastructure ==
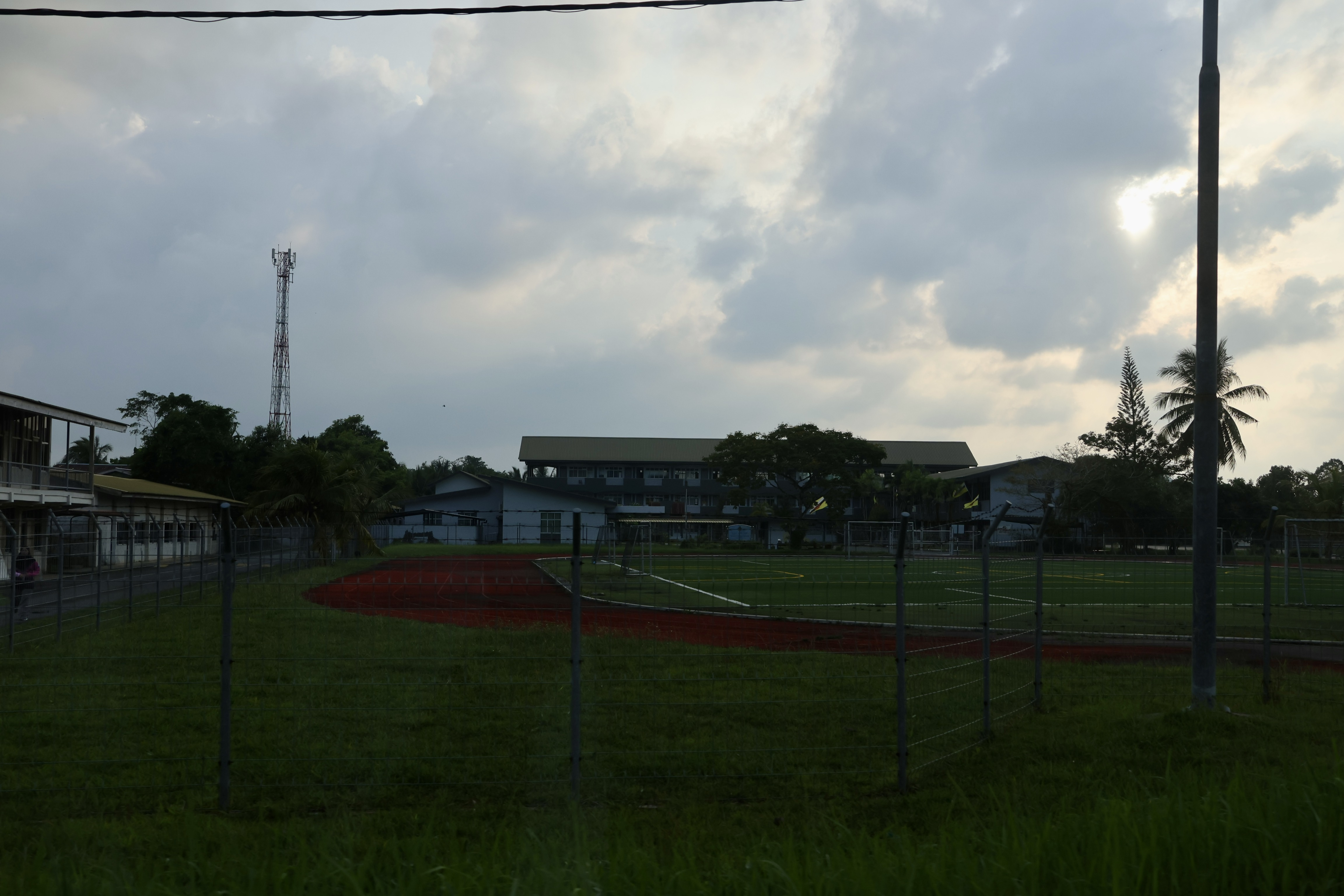
Keriam Primary School

Kampong Keriam experienced rapid development with the establishment of grocery shops and government buildings such as schools and a mosque. In 1938, the first school in the village was built by the villagers on the site of the current school.

A balai raya (community hall) was constructed in 1954. The hall served as a venue for village discussions and activities related to religion and welfare. Activities conducted by the villagers included Quranic studies, dikir recitations, and adult education classes.

In 1957, a mosque was built in the village. Furthermore, the residents of Kampong Keriam received electricity supplied by the government in 1979.

== Mythology ==
Pangkalan Jong, located in Kampong Keriam, is one of the earliest settlements in the Tutong District. Due to its strategic position at the confluence of Sungai Kelakas and Sungai Birau, it became a bustling centre of communication and trade for nearby villages. Furthermore, Pangkalan Jong has a large bay, making it an ideal stopping point for foreign trading ships. This is why the area is named Pangkalan Jong, after the ships and jong boats that docked there.

According to oral tradition, the village was once attacked by karok (Anabas testudineus) fish, said to be as large as a nyiru (winnowing basket). These fish filled every well in the village, making it difficult for the villagers to obtain water and food. As a result, many villagers fled to other areas. One night, an elder in the village had a dream that advised them not to flee, but instead gave them a remedy: they should create a boat rope made from the roots of the tuba plant, strike it to release its poison, and pour the liquid into the river. The villagers followed this advice, and soon after, the karok fish died, their carcasses piling up like hills along the river. The river was thereafter known as Sungai Penabang.

Due to the hardships caused by the karok attack, some of the villagers fled as far as Banjarmasin in Kalimantan, and settled in a village there. This is confirmed by a story told to Ligah bin Udin, who met one of the villagers in Banjarmasin. The villagers there still spoke the Tutong language and acknowledged that their ancestors came from Pangkalan Jong. Further proof came from a religious teacher from Banjarmasin, who once visited Brunei and noted the similarities between the language spoken in Penanjong, and that of his ancestors in Banjarmasin.

The advice given in the elder's dream turned out to be a discovery and legacy, not only for the villagers at the time but also for future generations. This discovery was the method of fishing using tuba (Derris elliptica) root, a type of fish poison made from various toxic roots.

The story also carries a lesson about the karok fish, which, once small and a favourite food of the villagers, suddenly became a deadly enemy. Behind this event, it’s clear that something done by one of the villagers caused the calamity to occur. As for the migration of Pangkalan Jong's people to Banjarmasin, further research should be conducted to preserve these stories and evidence before they are lost forever.

== Notable people ==
- Taha Abdul Rauf (born 1933), a legislative councillor
- Sulaiman Damit (1941–2016), a diplomat and military officer
- Husin Ahmad (born 1944), a diplomat and military officer
