= Kampong Sungai Buloh =

Village in Brunei

Sungai Buloh Kampung Sungai Buloh
- Village
- Kampong Sungai Buloh
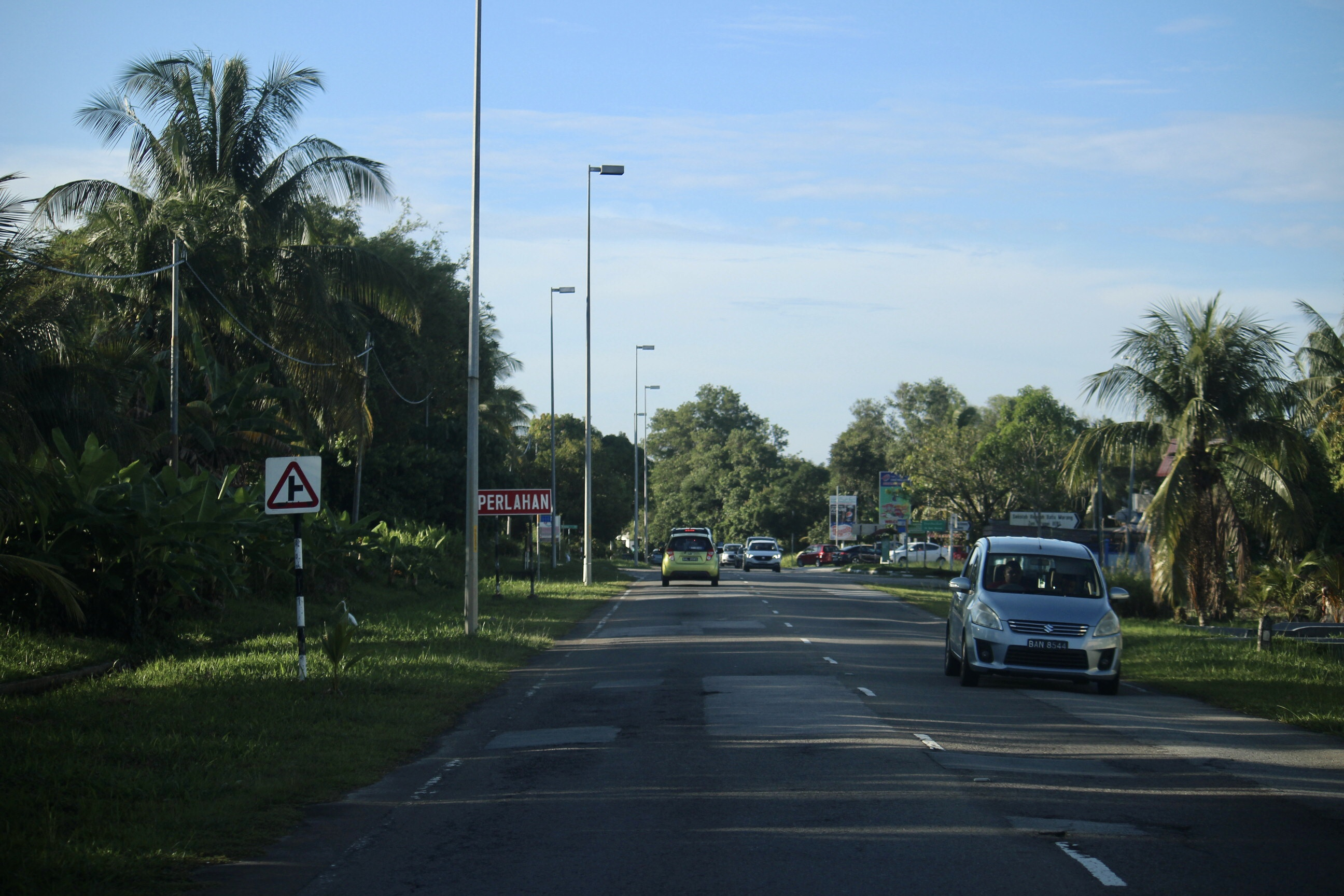

- Location in Brunei
- Coordinates: 4°59′24″N 115°01′23″E
- Country: Brunei
- District: Brunei-Muara
- Mukim: Mentiri

Government
  - Village head: Pengiran Ismail Ibrahim

Population (2016)
  - Total: 3,857
- Time zone: UTC+8 (BNT)
- Postcode: BU1229

Kampong Sungai Buloh is a village in the north-east of Brunei-Muara District, Brunei. The population was 3,857 in 2016. It comprises the original village settlement as well as the public housing area STKRJ Kampong Sungai Buloh.

== Geography ==
Kampong Sungai Buloh is one of the villages in Mukim Mentiri, a mukim in Brunei-Muara District. As a village subdivision, it borders Kampong Salar to the north-east, Kampong Mentiri and RPN Panchor Mengkubau to the south, and Kampong Tanah Jambu to the west.

== Facilities ==
=== Mosque ===
Kampong Sungai Buloh Mosque is the village mosque; it was inaugurated on 7 October 1983. The mosque can accommodate 370 worshippers.
