= Hassanal Bolkiah Mosque, Mentiri =

Mosque in Mentiri, Brunei-Muara, Brunei

Hassanal Bolkiah Mosque
- Masjid Hassanal Bolkiah مسجد حسن البلقیة (Jawi)
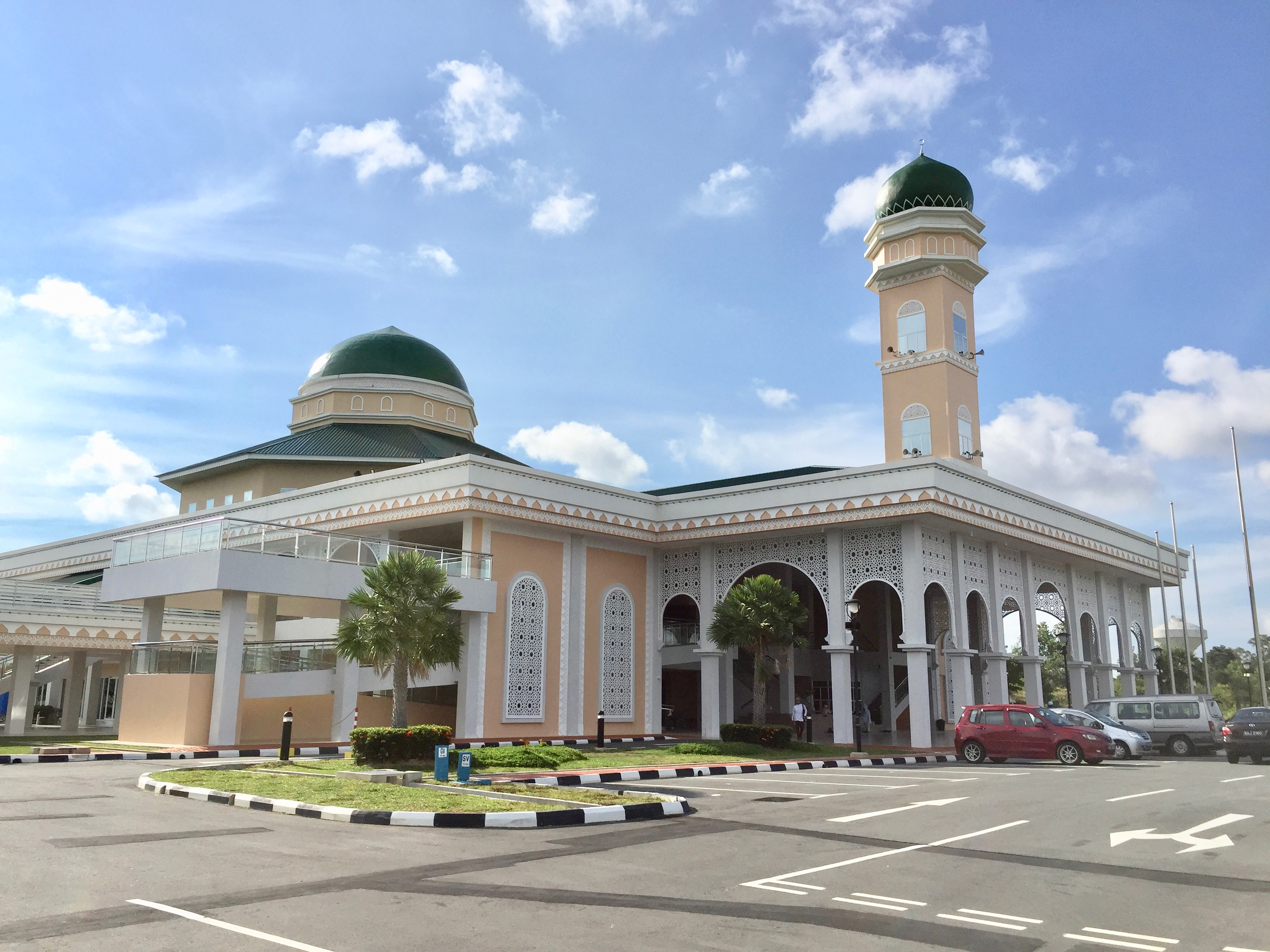

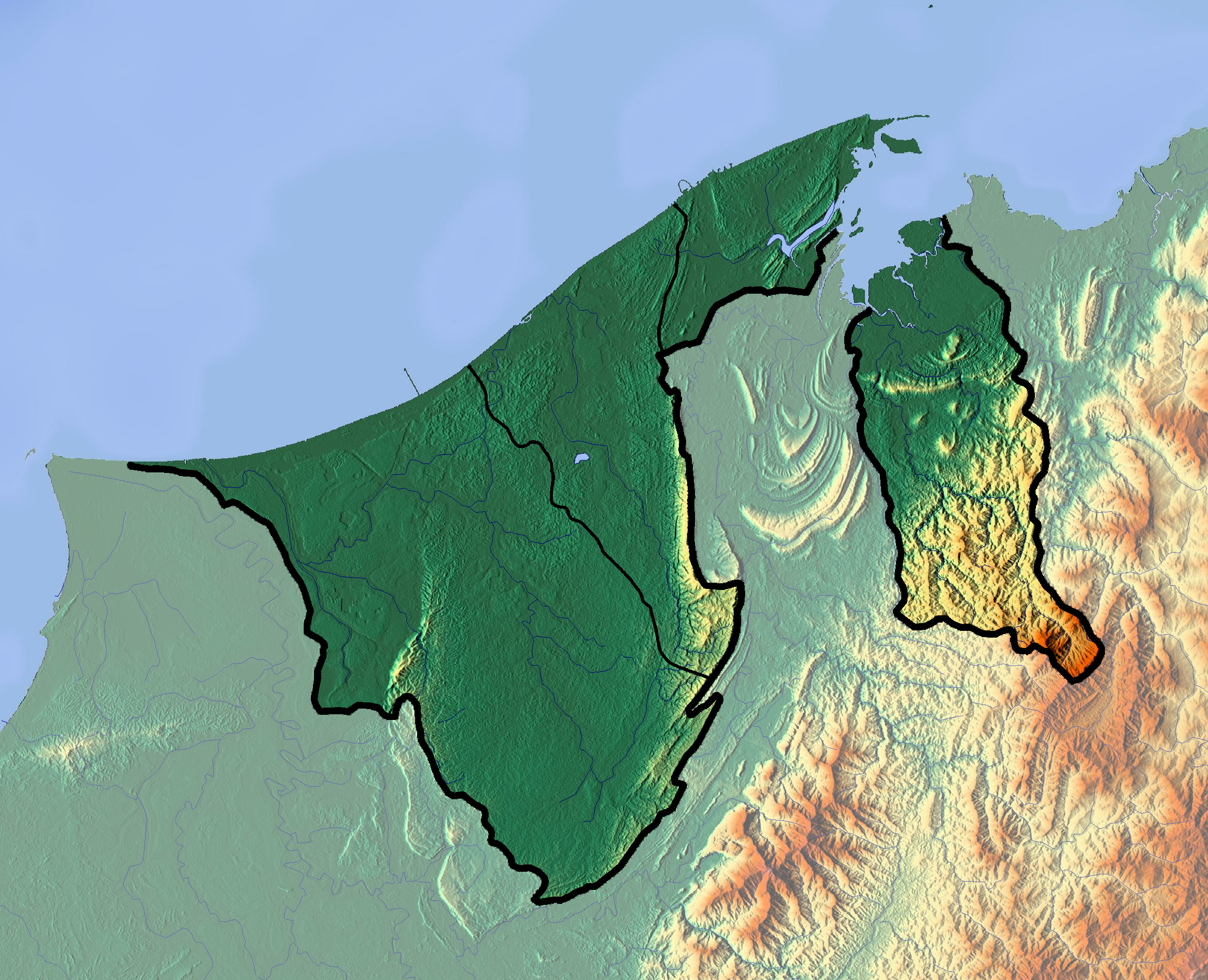
- Location of the mosque in Brunei

Religion
- Affiliation: Sunni Islam
- Ecclesiastical or organisational status: Mosque
- Status: Active

Location
- Location: Mentiri, Brunei-Muara
- Country: Brunei
- Interactive map of Hassanal Bolkiah Mosque
- Coordinates: 4°58′00″N 115°01′48″E

Architecture
- Type: mosque
- Founder: Hassanal Bolkiah
- Completed: 2017

Specifications
- Dome: 1
- Minaret: 1

The Hassanal Bolkiah Mosque (Malay: Masjid Hassanal Bolkiah) is a Sunni mosque in Mentiri, a settlement area in Brunei-Muara District of Brunei.

== History ==
The construction of the mosque began on 2 May 2017 with the foundation laying ceremony held three days later. It was built by the command of Hassanal Bolkiah, the Sultan of Brunei, to replace the previous mosque, the Kampong Mentiri National Housing Scheme Mosque, which was destroyed in a fire on 5 April 2017. The construction was completed in 49 days; andt was officially opened by the Sultan on 23 June 2017, held after the inaugural Friday prayers at the mosque.

== See also ==
- List of mosques in Brunei
- Islam in Brunei
