= Kampong Sungai Kelugos =

- Village
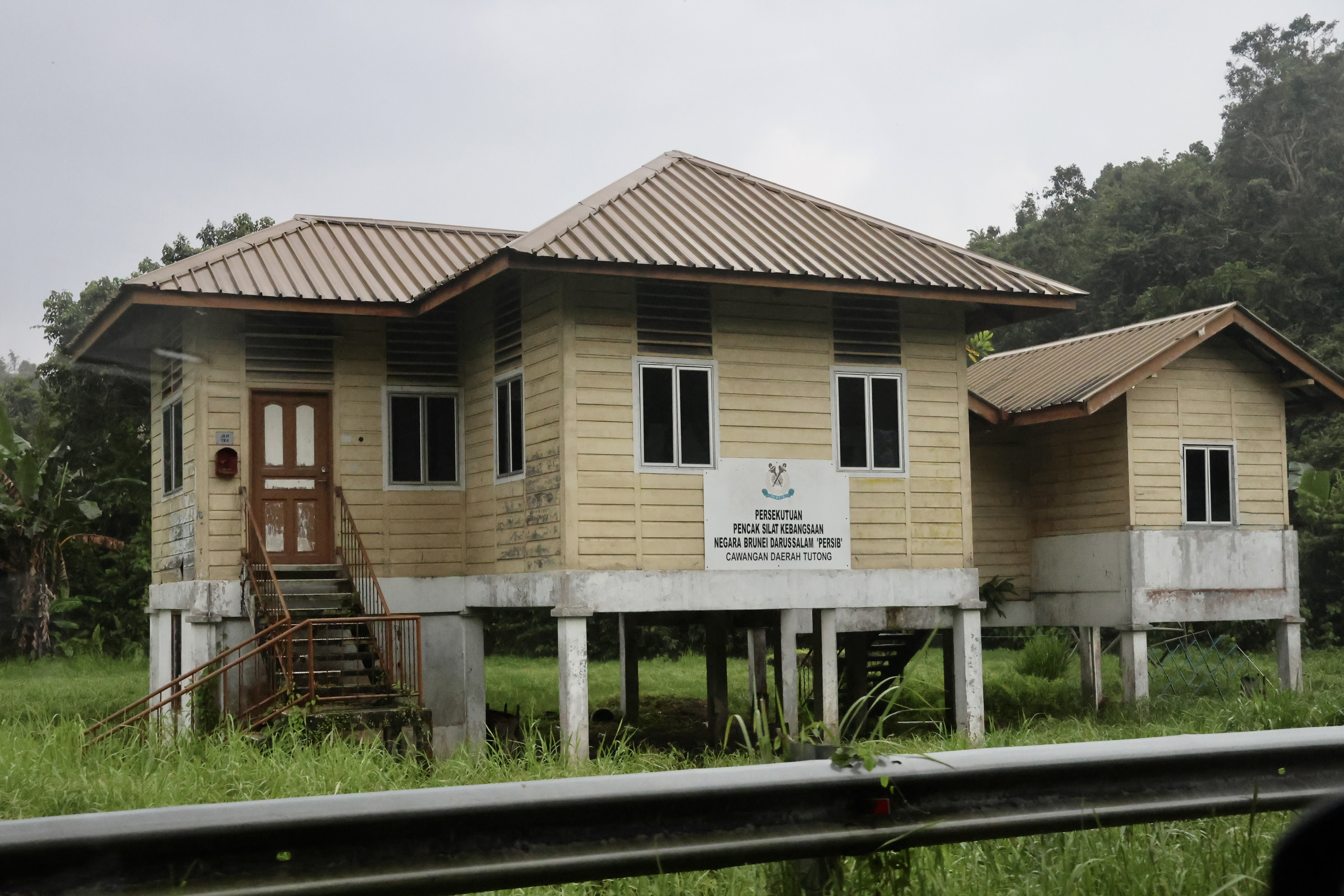

- Location in Brunei
- Coordinates: 4°48′34″N 114°45′42″E
- Country: Brunei
- District: Tutong
- Mukim: Keriam

Government
  - Village head: Masri Mohamad

Population (2016)
  - Total: 900
- Time zone: UTC+8 (BNT)
- Postcode: TB2741

Kampong Sungai Kelugos is a village in Tutong District, Brunei, about 14–15 kilometres (8.7–9.3 mi) from the district town Pekan Tutong. The population was 900 in 2016. It is one of the villages within Mukim Keriam.

== History ==
The village was the result of a merger of three villages, consisting of Kampong Batu 18, Kampong Batu 19 and Kampong Batu 20.

== Mosque ==
Pengiran Anak Isteri Pengiran Anak Sarah (PAIPAS) Mosque is the village mosque. It is named after Princess Sarah, the consort of Crown Prince Al-Muhtadee Billah.
