= Kampong Batu Marang =

Village in Brunei

- Village
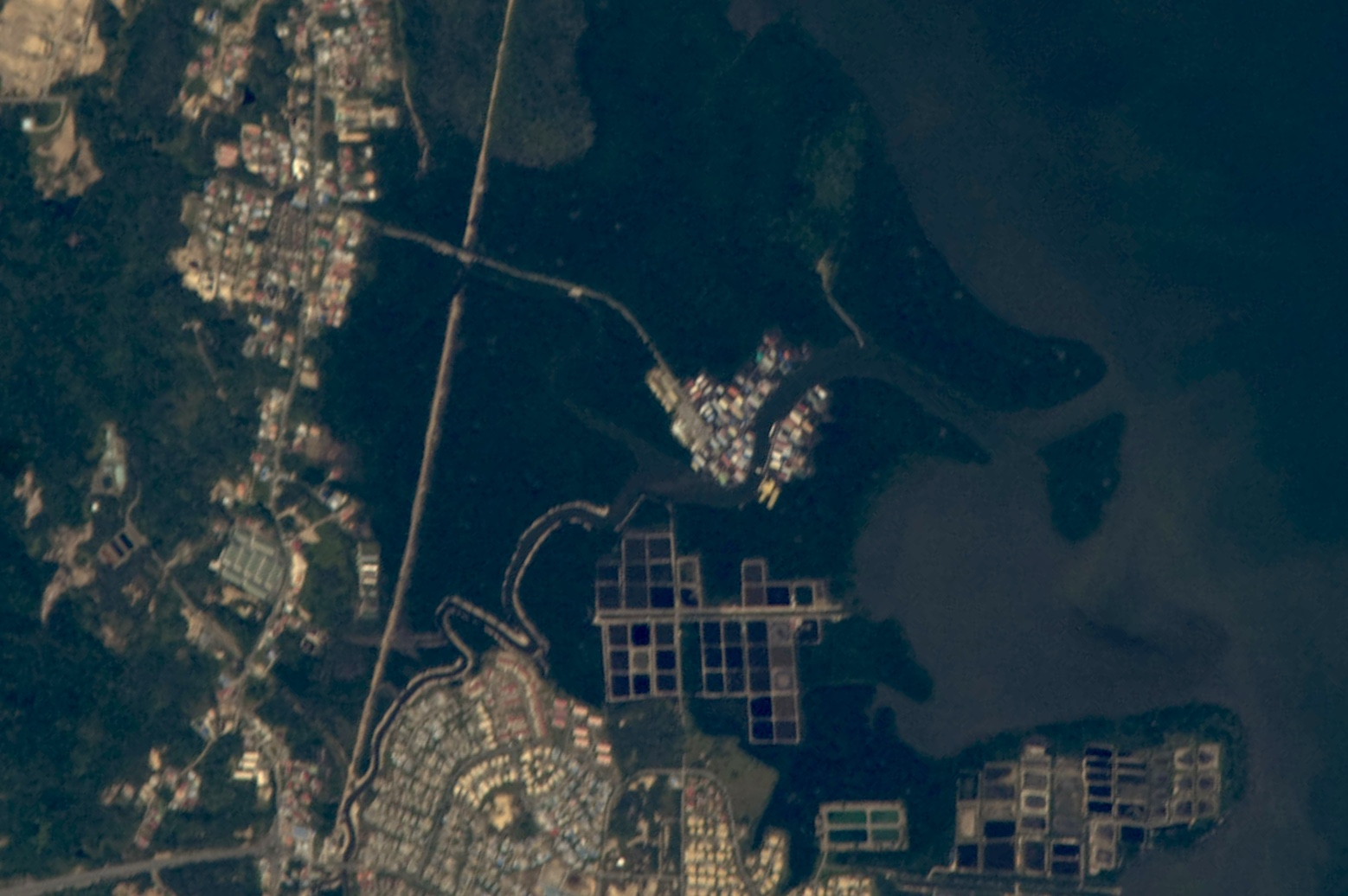
- Batu Marang as seen from space in 2010.

- Location in Brunei
- Coordinates: 4°58′55″N 115°02′01″E
- Country: Brunei
- District: Brunei-Muara
- Mukim: Mentiri

Government
  - Village head: Maidin Tarip

Population (2016)
  - Total: 870
- Time zone: UTC+8 (BNT)
- Postcode: BU1529

Kampong Batu Marang is a village within Mukim Mentiri in Brunei-Muara District, Brunei. The population was 870 in 2016.

== Geography ==
Kampong Batu Marang is located in the northeastern part of the district. As a village subdivision, it borders Kampong Salar to the north, the Brunei Bay to the east, RPN Kampong Mentiri to the south, Kampong Mentiri to the southwest and Kampong Sungai Buloh to the west. The actual populated area only exists as a small cluster of stilted dwellings on the banks near the mouth of Mentiri River, a small river which flows into the Brunei Bay, and surrounded by dense vegetation. It is only accessible by land from Kampong Sungai Buloh.

== Facilities ==
=== School ===
- Batu Marang Primary School

=== Mosque ===
Kampong Batu Marang Mosque is the village mosque and was opened for use on 19 January 1996. It can accommodate 1,000 worshippers. The mosque celebrated its silver jubilee anniversary of its establishment in 2021.

== See also ==
- Kampong Ayer
