= Kampong Kupang =

Village in Brunei

Kupang
- Village
- Kampong Kupang
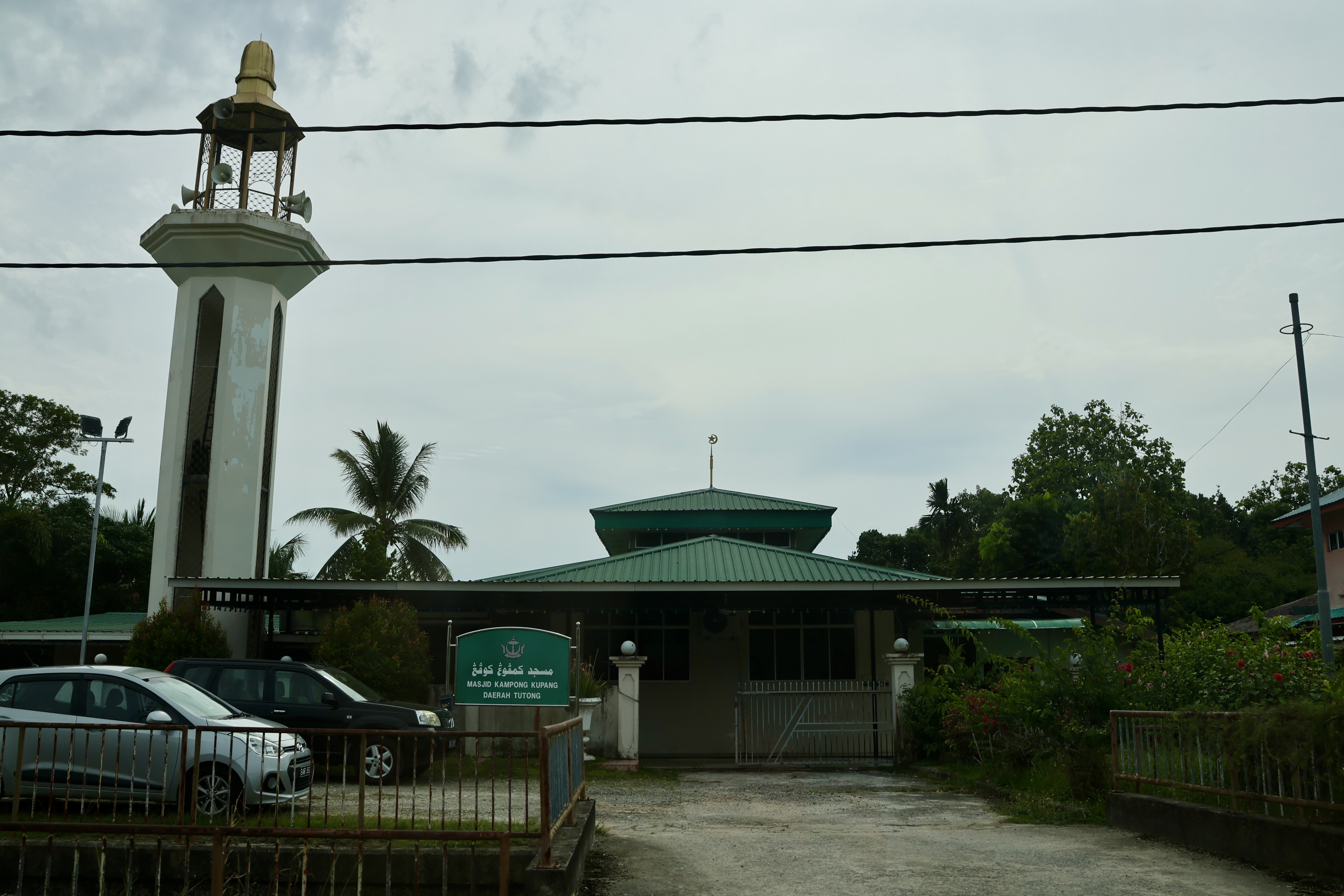
- Kampong Kupang Mosque

- Location in Brunei
- Coordinates: 4°50′38″N 114°47′40″E
- Country: Brunei
- District: Tutong
- Mukim: Keriam

Government
  - Village head: Nor Sumanty Puasa

Area
  - Total: 10.0845 km^{2} (3.8936 sq mi)

Population (2016)
  - Total: 1,795
  - Density: 178.0/km^{2} (461.0/sq mi)
- Time zone: UTC+8 (BNT)
- Postcode: TB2941

Kampong Kupang (Malay: Kampung Kupang) or simply known as Kupang, is a village in Tutong District, Brunei, about 21 kilometres (13 mi) from the district town Pekan Tutong. The population was 1,795 in 2016. It is one of the villages within Mukim Keriam, a mukim subdivision in the district.

== Etymology ==
According to folktales, the name of Kampong Kupang was taken in conjunction with the name of a tree called 'pokok kupang'. This tree has its quirks and is different from other trees. Among the differences is that the bark of this tree seems to be overgrown by a type of seashell, kupang (blue mussel). These trees grow in small numbers and in high ground such as in the hills. The height of this tree is said to be like a durian tree and its shape is like a durian tree. No one really knows who was the person who first discovered this kupang tree and who first named this village as 'Kampong Kupang'. Due to the fact that this tree from the beginning grew in only a small number, unfortunately at this time this tree is no longer found and may have become extinct.

== History ==
According to other assumptions, it is also possible that the origin of the name of Kampong Kupang was based on history through the voyage of the 5th Sultan of Brunei, Sultan Bolkiah around 1473 to 1521, telling about the frequency of his diligent travels and stops in the archipelago such as the islands of Java, Sumatra, Kalimantan and included in the land of the Philippines. While in Java, Sultan Bolkiah was able to see the culture and observe the way the Javanese live their daily life activities such as farming known as the Kedayan tribe. With the crafts of this tribe, he attracted the attention of the Sultan and offered this tribe to settle in Brunei at that time. When they arrived in Brunei, the Kedayan tribe brought from Java was placed on the coast of Kampong Jerudong, they started cultivating and growing rice in that area for many years by moving to other places until they reached Kampong Kupang.

It is very likely that the Kedayan tribe brought by the Sultan came from Timor, Indonesia from a place called Kupang Pulau Timor and because it was this tribe that first inhabited this village, it is assumed that this village is called 'Kampong Orang Kupang' and abbreviated to Kampong Kupang remains until now. The original inhabitants of the village are pure Kedayan tribes and there was no mixture of tribes or other nations and according to another source another group of tribes also comes from Bandung, Indonesia which were also brought together by the Sultan of Brunei at that time and the legitimacy of the Bandung area still exists in Indonesia but now it has been inhabited by people from a new tribe.

According to another source, the Kedayan tribe that comes from Bandung also resides in Kampong Kupang and lives near a river called Sungai Bandong (Bandong River). This river is used by the Kedayan tribe who come from Bandung as a place to get a daily supply of water for eating and drinking and used as a place to bathe and take water to water gardens and so on. The name and the river still remain today. Based on the similarity of place names in our country with the land of Java (Indonesia), it is highly likely that the story flow has continuity with the history of the 5th Sultan of Brunei, Sultan Bolkiah who brought the Kedayan tribe from Java, so there is a similarity of name and place, among others Sungai Sundai (Sundai River) which is located in Kampong Beribi, Kampong Kupang, Kampong Putat and may be many more.

== Archeology ==
On the banks of the Mendaun River, is the Terusan Kupang (Kupang Canal), home to Brunei Bay's oldest archeological site. Pottery pieces from the Song (960–1290), Ming (1368–1644), and Qing (1644–1911) dynasties, as well as Siamese, European, and indigenous ceramics, are abundant in this region. In addition, artifacts including animal bones, beads, iron, wood, resin, copper objects, and coins from the Qing Dynasty were discovered. Since the area's excavations started in 1977, researchers have been unable to ascertain the degree to which Brunei's early history was shaped by the Kupang Canal.

The Kupang Canal is not mentioned in Brunei's oral tradition, particularly in Syair Awang Semaun, which describes the entry of Awang Alak Betatar and his siblings from upstream Limbang to Brunei in the middle of the 14th century to establish a new state on the Brunei River. Based mainly on the examination of Sung Dynasty ceramics unearthed in the area, it is probable that the site had already decline when Awang Alak Betatar arrived. This indicates that human habitation of the Kupang Canal occurred only from the 10th to the 13th centuries. Before Awang Alak Betatar arrived, founded his empire on the Brunei River, and relocated to Kota Batu in the 14th century, the Kupang Canal served as the hub of early Brunei under the Sung Dynasty.

The inhabitants living along the Kupang Canal are said to be a diverse mix of races and ethnic groups, including the Malays from ancient Johor, the Dusun, the Ida'an, the Murut (Lun Bawang), and the Bisaya ethnic groups. This belief is based on the fact that native pottery is found in this area. But in the 17th century, Chinese pottery from the Qing Dynasty and European pottery from the 18th and 19th centuries were discovered nearby, and the Kupang Canal's significance as a commerce hub was restored. The site's resurgence is demonstrated by the fact that its name, Quela Cupan, was added to a Dutch map in 1710.

== Administration ==
A total of five areas included within the village, namely Kampong Kupang with an area of 10.0845 square kilometers with 932 villagers; Kampong Maraburong with an area of 9.5429 square kilometers with 602 villagers; Kampong Ikas/Bandong with an area of 5.4957 square kilometers with 22 villagers; Jalan Kerakas Payau village with 448 villagers and Jalan Pulau Beluboh village with 156 villagers.

== Demography ==
As of 2018 the village was inhabited by 2,160 people.

== Economy ==
The village products found in this village are live flower and fruit nurseries. The residents of this village usually sell the seedlings at Tutong Market every Thursday, Gadong Market on Fridays. There are also sales held at the Forest Horticulture Center every day.

== Infrastructure ==
Like other villages, this village has access to several facilities provided by the government such as roads, water, telephone and electricity. There are also several government buildings, namely a mosque (Kampong Kupang Mosque), a government school (Orang Kaya Ali Wanika Setia Diraja Kupang Primary School), a religious school (Kupang Religious School), two police stations, Maraburong Prison, Al-Islah Centre, Narcotics Control Bureau (both buildings are placed in a special area), vegetable and fruit stalls (which houses 14 stalls).

=== Education ===
- The village primary school is Orang Kaya Ali Wanika Setia Diraja Kupang Primary School.
- Kupang Religious School is the village school for the country's Islamic religious primary education.

=== Places of interest ===
- Kampong Kupang Mosque is the village mosque; it was inaugurated on 10 February 1984 by the then Chief Kadi of Brunei. The mosque can accommodate 500 worshippers.
- This village also has several wasai (small waterfall) and waterfalls, namely Wasai Tarus located in Kampong Maraburong, Wasai Tujuh Tingkat located in Kampong Kupang and Tasek Biru.

=== Archaeological site ===
On the banks of the Mendaun River, is the Terusan Kupang (Kupang Canal), home to Brunei Bay's oldest archeological site. Pottery pieces from the Song (960–1290), Ming (1368–1644), and Qing (1644–1911) dynasties, as well as Siamese, European, and indigenous ceramics, are abundant in this region. In addition, artifacts including animal bones, beads, iron, wood, resin, copper objects, and coins from the Qing Dynasty were discovered. Since the area's excavations started in 1977, researchers have been unable to ascertain the degree to which Brunei's early history was shaped by the Kupang Canal.

The Kupang Canal is not mentioned in Brunei's oral tradition, particularly in Syair Awang Semaun, which describes the entry of Awang Alak Betatar and his siblings from upstream Limbang to Brunei in the middle of the 14th century to establish a new state on the Brunei River. Based mainly on the examination of Sung Dynasty ceramics unearthed in the area, it is probable that the site had already decline when Awang Alak Betatar arrived. This indicates that human habitation of the Kupang Canal occurred only from the 10th to the 13th centuries. Before Awang Alak Betatar arrived, founded his empire on the Brunei River, and relocated to Kota Batu in the 14th century, the Kupang Canal served as the hub of early Brunei under the Sung Dynasty.

The inhabitants living along the Kupang Canal are said to be a diverse mix of races and ethnic groups, including the Malays from ancient Johor, the Dusun, the Ida'an, the Murut (Lun Bawang), and the Bisaya ethnic groups. This belief is based on the fact that native pottery is found in this area. But in the 17th century, Chinese pottery from the Qing Dynasty and European pottery from the 18th and 19th centuries were discovered nearby, and the Kupang Canal's significance as a commerce hub was restored. The site's resurgence is demonstrated by the fact that its name, Quela Cupan, was added to a Dutch map in 1710.
