= Kampong Bukit Panggal =

Village in Brunei

Bukit Panggal
- Village
- Kampong Bukit Panggal
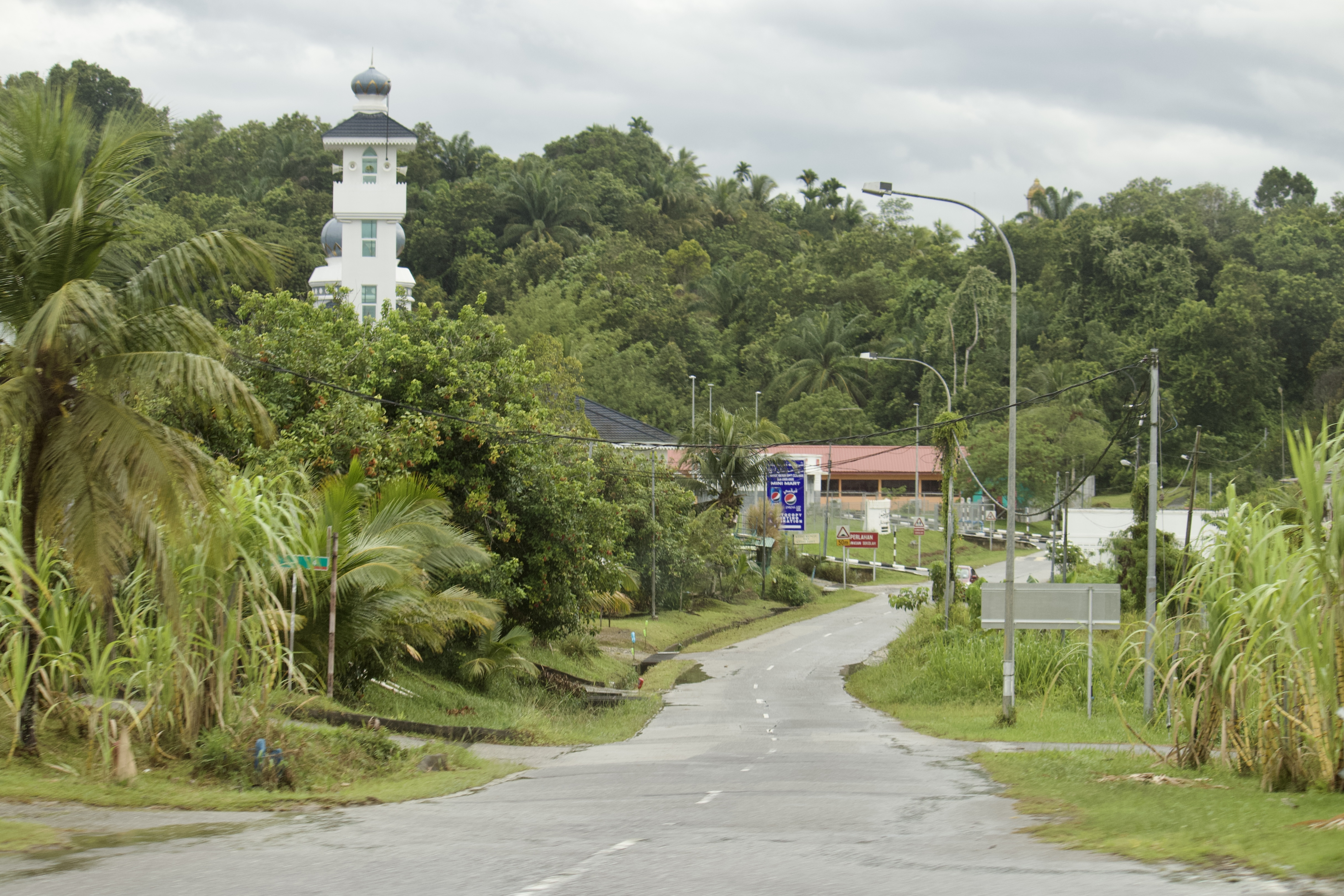

- Location in Brunei
- Coordinates: 4°49′42″N 114°43′36″E
- Country: Brunei
- District: Tutong
- Mukim: Keriam

Government
  - Village head: Dandarawi Nasar

Area
  - Total: 508.74 ha (1,257.1 acres)

Population (2016)
  - Total: 801
  - Density: 157/km^{2} (408/sq mi)
- Time zone: UTC+8 (BNT)
- Postcode: TB1341

Kampong Bukit Panggal is a village in Tutong District, Brunei, about 10 kilometres (6.2 mi) from the district town Pekan Tutong. The population was 801 in 2016. It is one of the villages within Mukim Keriam, a mukim in the district.

== Etymology ==
The history of the Istiadat Perpuspaan, often known as the 'Pertabalan' (Enthronement) of the Sultan of Brunei, once made reference to Kampong Bukit Panggal. In those days, there were two means to proclaim a state funeral: the yellow flag was flown at Bukit Panggal in Tutong, and the red flag was flown at Bukit Sungai Kebun. Therefore, the village could be named after Bukit Panggal (Panggal Hill).

== Demography ==
As of 2018, the population of the village is approximately 643 people who originally consisted of the Kedayan tribe.

== Infrastructure ==
A primary school with morning and afternoon religious education sessions is one among the services offered by the government. Another is a food and vegetable stand on Jalan Binturan that also generates energy and telecommunications.

=== Education ===
- Bukit Panggal Primary School, the village's main primary school.
- Bukit Panggal Religious School, the village school for the country's Islamic religious primary education. Its ground is shared with the primary school.

=== Places of interest ===
Ar-Rahim Mosque, inaugurated on 17 May 2019 by Sultan Hassanal Bolkiah and can accommodate about 800 to 1000 worshippers. It replaces the former Kampong Bukit Panggal Mosque, which had been closed since 2017; it had become unsafe for use due to structural issues. The mosque was built in 1995 and accommodated 250 worshippers. The erecting ceremony for the new Kampong Bukit Panggal Mosque (Ar-Rahim Mosque) was held. The mosque is projected to be finished in July 2018 and was built on a 5.0 hectare parcel of land utilizing estimated funding from the Brunei Darussalam Mosque Construction Fund equivalent to BND3 million.

== Economy ==
Due to Syarikat Cakoi Mahyuddin's presence, Kampung Bukit Panggal residents often mention about it. Dayang Fatimah binti Haji Mustapa, the founder of the business, is from the hamlet and has been working on the product for more than ten years. Her younger brother, who had gone to school in Malaysia, taught her the recipe and how to produce cakoi. From there, she became interested and active in making cakoi, but only for the family. From the family meal, she took steps to market it to the public. Unexpectedly, her product received a response from various walks of life who flocked to buy cakoi made by her known as Bukit Panggal Cakoi sold at the price of two pieces of BND1 for wedding cakoi and three pieces of empty cakoi BND1.
