= Kampong Tanah Jambu =

Tanah Jambu
- Village
- Kampong Tanah Jambu
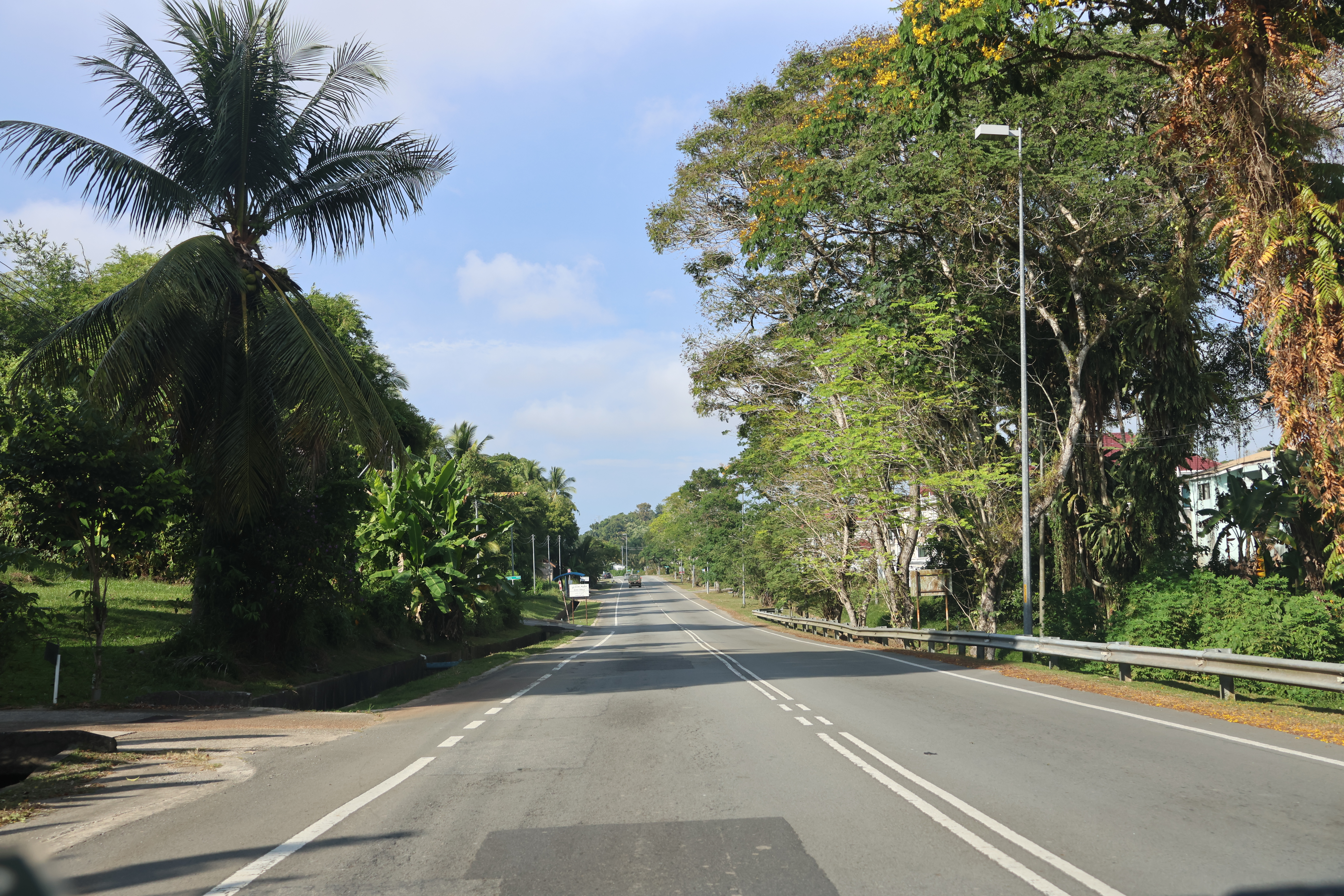
- Jalan Muara

- Location in Brunei
- Coordinates: 4°59′45″N 115°00′07″E
- Country: Brunei
- District: Brunei-Muara
- Mukim: Mentiri

Government
  - Village head: Sarabani Bakir

Population (2016)
  - Total: 8,809
- Time zone: UTC+8 (BNT)
- Postcode: BU1129

Kampong Tanah Jambu is a village in the north-east of Brunei-Muara District, Brunei. The population was 8,809 in 2016. It encompasses the original village settlement, as well as the public housing areas STKRJ Kampong Tanah Jambu and RPN Kampong Tanah Jambu.

== Etymology ==
The village is named after jambu (guava) tree.

== Geography ==
Kampong Tanah Jambu is one of the villages in Mukim Mentiri, a mukim in Brunei-Muara District. It is one of the villages along Jalan Muara, a road which links Bandar Seri Begawan to Muara town.

== Infrastructure ==
=== Housing ===
The National Housing Scheme (RPN) Kampong Tanah Jambu has 1,522 houses under development, including an additional 356 houses under the STKRJ program. The majority of the dwellings are semi-detached or terrace houses. By May 2013, around 430 terrace houses were formally granted to recipients, with ongoing allocations planned throughout the year. The Housing Development Department has also considered a potential vertical housing project within the site, which could add 2,500 units, although no further details on this proposal have been provided. As of 2 May 2017, Telbru's connectivity efforts to over 15,500 households for housing schemes under the Housing Development Department have been surpassed by the installation of Fibre-to-the-Home (FTTH) networks for inhabitants of the RPN Kampong Tanah Jambu project.

After the foundation-laying ceremony on 8 August 2023, 950 units of terrace homes for the RPN Kampong Tanah Jambu are expected to be completed in 2024. The Phase 7 residences at RPN Kampong Tanah Jambu are being built in accordance with the 11th National Development Plan. Thong & Thong Sdn Bhd is the contractor managing the B$96 million project.

=== Education ===
- Defence Academy Royal Brunei Armed Forces is a military academy for the Royal Brunei Armed Forces (RBAF).
- Tanah Jambu Religious School is a religious education institution.
- Tanah Jambu Primary School is a primary education institution.

=== Mosque ===
Kampong Tanah Jambu Mosque is the village mosque; it was inaugurated on 7 December 1979 and can accommodate 600 worshippers.

== Notable people ==
- Mohammad Daud (born 1943), military officer and politician
- Mahmud Saedon (1943–2002), writer
- Abdul Jalil Ahmad, naval officer and politician
