= Mukim Keriam =

Mukim in Brunei

- Mukim
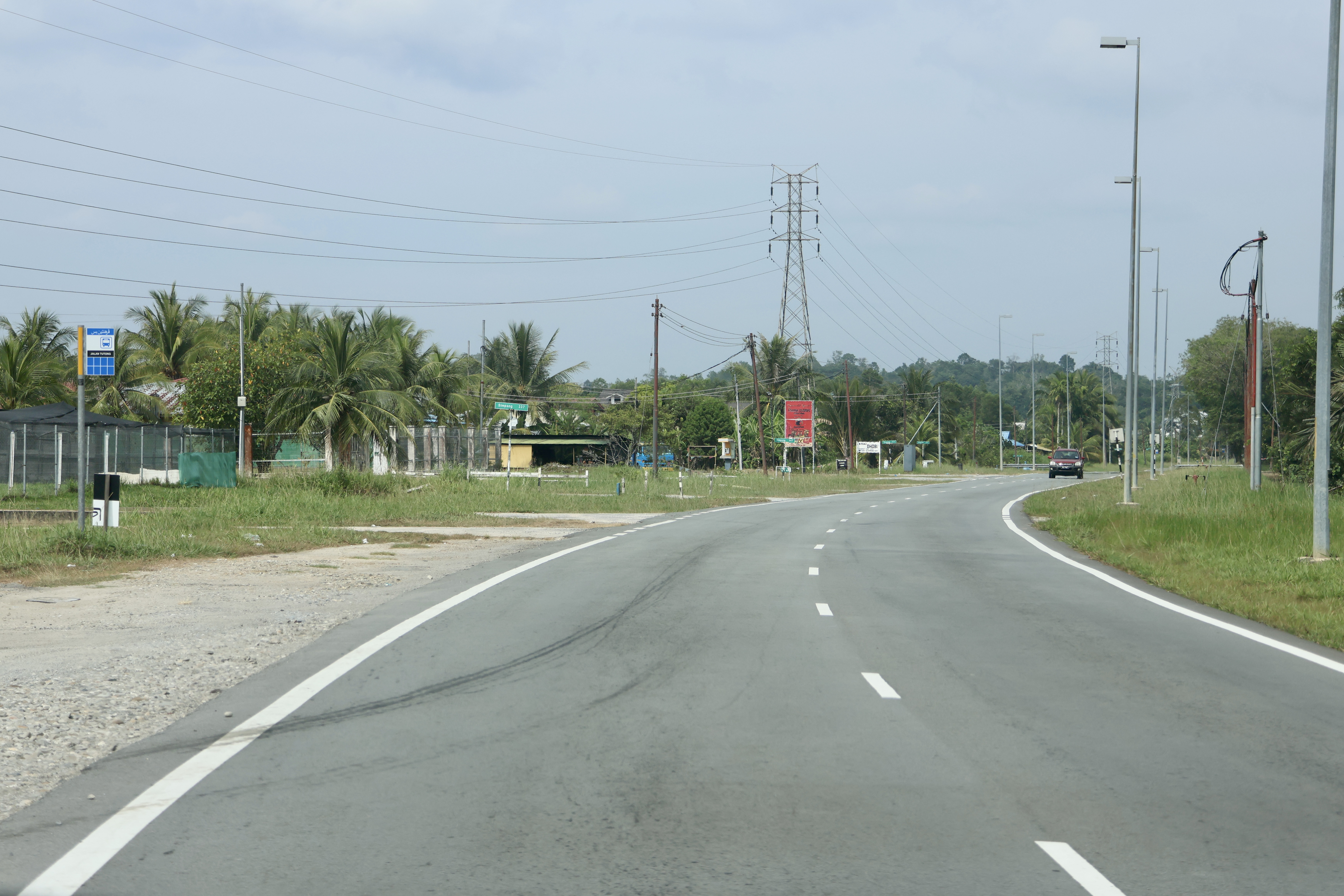
- Kampong Keriam

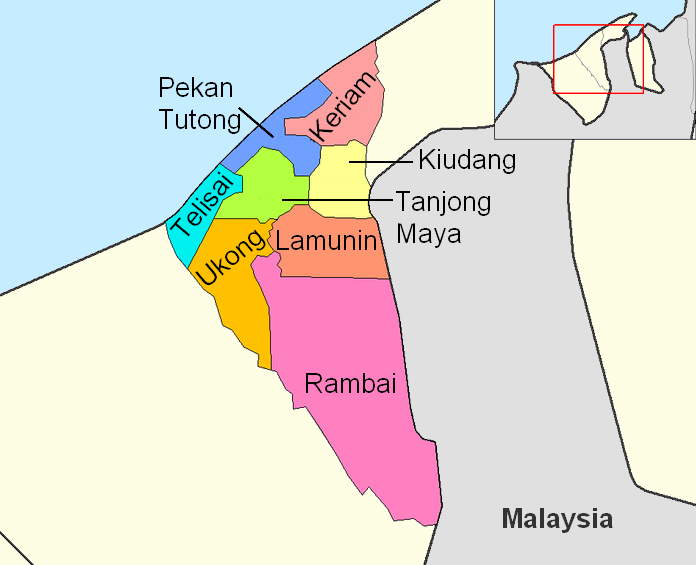
- Keriam is in red.
- Coordinates: 4.8213237°N 114.7268464°E
- Country: Brunei
- District: Tutong

Government
  - Penghulu: Joharry Abdul Karim

Population (2021)
  - Total: 8,589
- Time zone: UTC+8 (BNT)
- Postcode: TBxx41

Mukim Keriam is a mukim in Tutong District, Brunei. The population was 9,707 in 2016.

== Name ==
The mukim is named after Kampong Keriam, one of the villages it encompasses.

== Geography ==
The mukim is located in the north-east of Tutong District, bordering the South China Sea to the north, Mukim Sengkurong and Mukim Pengkalan Batu in Brunei-Muara District to the east, Mukim Kiudang to the south, and Mukim Pekan Tutong to the west.

== Demographics ==
As of 2016 census, the population was 9,707 with 52.6% males and 47.4% females. It had 1,773 households occupying 1,762 dwellings. The mukim is predominantly rural, with 83.3% living in rural areas.

== Administration ==
As of 2021, the mukim comprised the following villages:

Settlements	Population (2021)	Ketua kampung (2024)
Kampong Keriam	1,980	Haji Bahrin bin Haji Bolhassan
Kampong Bukit Panggal	781	Mohammed Dandarawi bin Haji Awang Nasar
Kampong Luagan Dudok	844	Mohammed Dandarawi bin Haji Awang Nasar
Kampong Sinaut	879	Haji Masri bin Haji Mohamad
Kampong Sungai Kelugos	844	Haji Masri bin Haji Mohamad
Kampong Maraburong	457	—N/a
Kampong Kupang	1,728	Haji Nor Sumanty bin Haji Awang Puasa
Kampong Ikas	92	—N/a
Binturan Firing Range Area	984	—N/a
