= Mukim Mentiri =

Mukim of Brunei

- Mukim
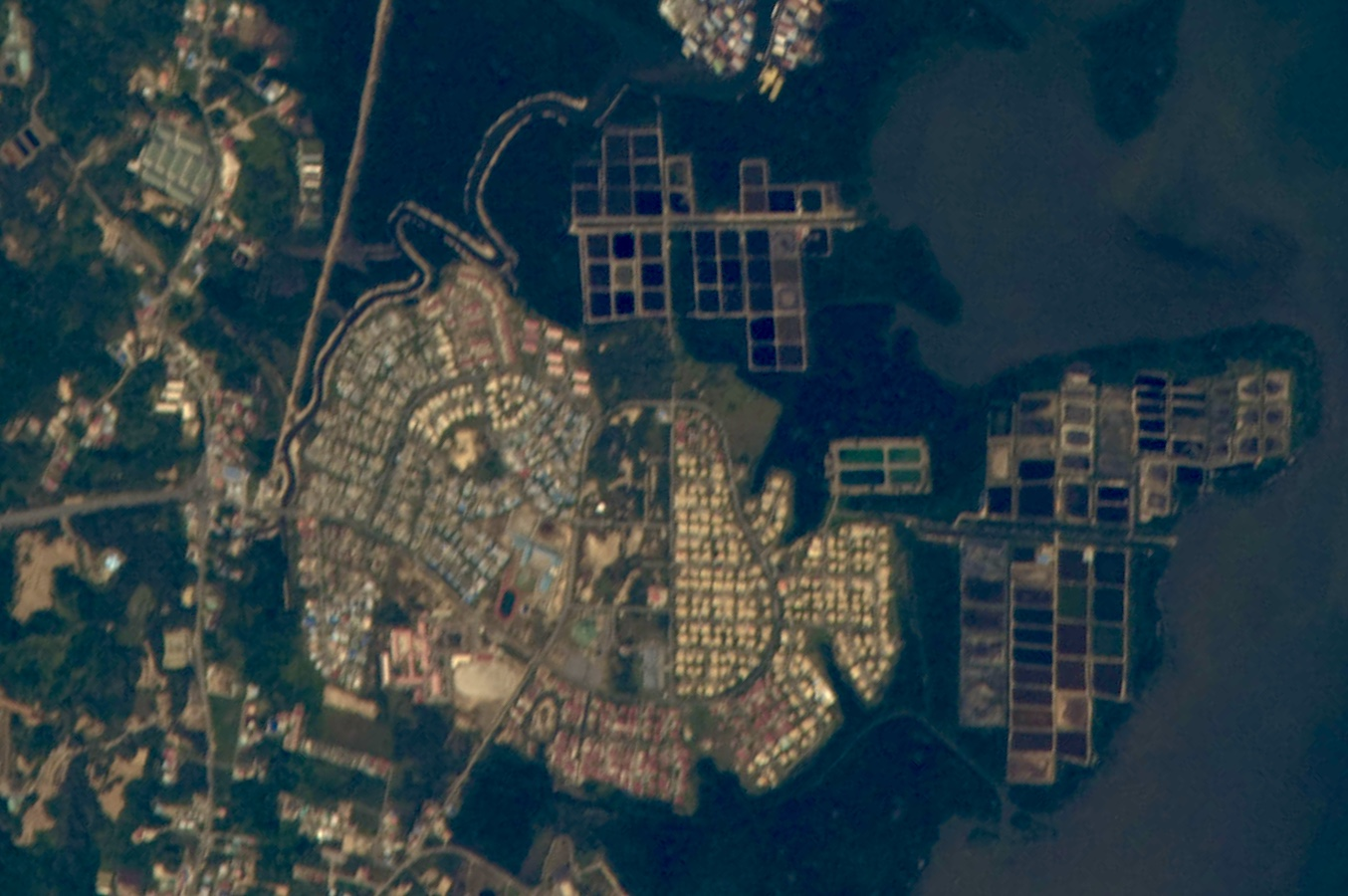
- Mentiri as seen from space in 2010.

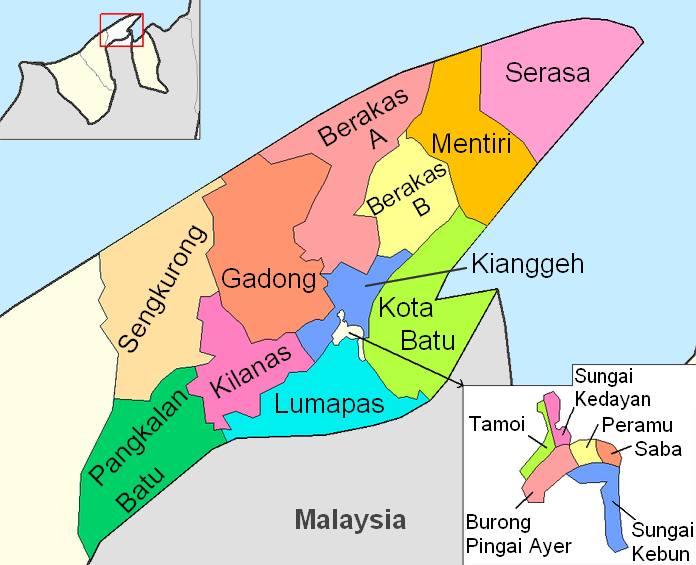
- Mentiri is in orange.
- Coordinates: 4.962°N 115.023°E
- Country: Brunei
- District: Brunei-Muara

Government
  - Penghulu: A. Hamidun Mohd Daud

Population (2021)
  - Total: 39,324
- Time zone: UTC+8 (BNT)
- Postcode: BUxx29

Mukim Mentiri is a mukim in Brunei-Muara District, Brunei. The population was 30,192 in 2016.

== Name ==
The mukim is named after Kampong Mentiri, one of the villages it encompasses.

== Geography ==
The mukim is located in the north-east of the district, bordering the South China Sea to the north, Mukim Serasa to the east, the Brunei Bay to the south, Mukim Kota Batu to the south-west and Mukim Berakas 'A' and Mukim Berakas 'B' to the west.

There are several islands included within the mukim, namely Pulau Salar, Pulau Simangga Besar and Pulau Bedukang.

== Demographics ==
As of 2016 census, the population was 30,192 with 49.8% males and 50.2% females. The mukim had 5,292 households occupying 5,280 dwellings. The entire population lived in urban areas.

== Administration ==
As of 2021, the mukim comprised the following census villages:

| Settlements | Population (2021) | Ketua kampung (2024) |
|---|---|---|
| Kampong Mentiri | 1,858 | Haji Bujang bin Sabtu |
| Kampong Mentiri Area 2 | 1,858 | Haji Mohammad Nizam bin Haji Julaihi |
| Kampong Sungai Buloh | 4,351 | Pengiran Haji Ismail bin Pengiran Haji Ibrahim @ Pengiran Abd Rahim |
| STKRJ Sungai Buloh | 4,351 | A. Hamidun bin Mohd Daud |
| Kampong Batu Marang | 748 | Haji Maidin bin Tarip |
| Kampong Tanah Jambu | 11,695 | Haji Sarabani bin Haji Bakir |
| Kampong Salar | 11,695 | Haji Sarabani bin Haji Bakir |
| RPN Tanah Jambu | 11,695 | Pengiran Mazrawi bin Pengiran Haji Mahmod |
| Kampong Panchor | 13,358 | —N/a |
| RPN Kampong Panchor Area 1 | 13,358 | Mohammad Hilmy bin Haji Ahmad (Acting) |
| RPN Kampong Panchor Area 2 | 13,358 | Haji Muhammad Eddie Hardey bin Haji Brahim |
| RPN Kampong Panchor Area 3 | 13,358 | Mohammad Hilmy bin Haji Ahmad |
| RPN Kampong Panchor Area 4 | 13,358 | Faidil Rosemady bin Mohamad |
| RPN Kampong Panchor Area 5 | 13,358 | Haji Hairul Azri bin Salamat |
| Kampong Pengkalan Sibabau | 876 | —N/a |
| RPN Kampong Mentiri Area 'A' (Note: RPN Mentiri Area 'A' and RPN Mentiri Area 'B' are collectively known as RPN Mentiri.) | 2,597 | Haji Abu Bakar bin Haji Pungut |
| RPN Kampong Mentiri Area 'B' | 2,854 | Haji Mohammad Nizam bin Haji Julaihi (Acting) |

== Infrastructures ==
The mukim is home to the following public housing estates:

- RPN Mentiri
- RPN Panchor Mengkubau
- RPN Tanah Jambu in Kampong Tanah Jambu
- STKRJ Sungai Buloh in Kampong Sungai Buloh
- STKRJ Tanah Jambu in Kampong Tanah Jambu

Pehin Datu Seri Maharaja Secondary School is the sole secondary school in the mukim.

Salar Industrial Park in Kampong Salar is one of the industrial parks in the country.

Kampong Salar is also home to the Embassy of Saudi Arabia.

== Sister cities/towns/mukims ==
- Bekasi, West Java, Indonesia
