= Kampong Sinaut =

- Village
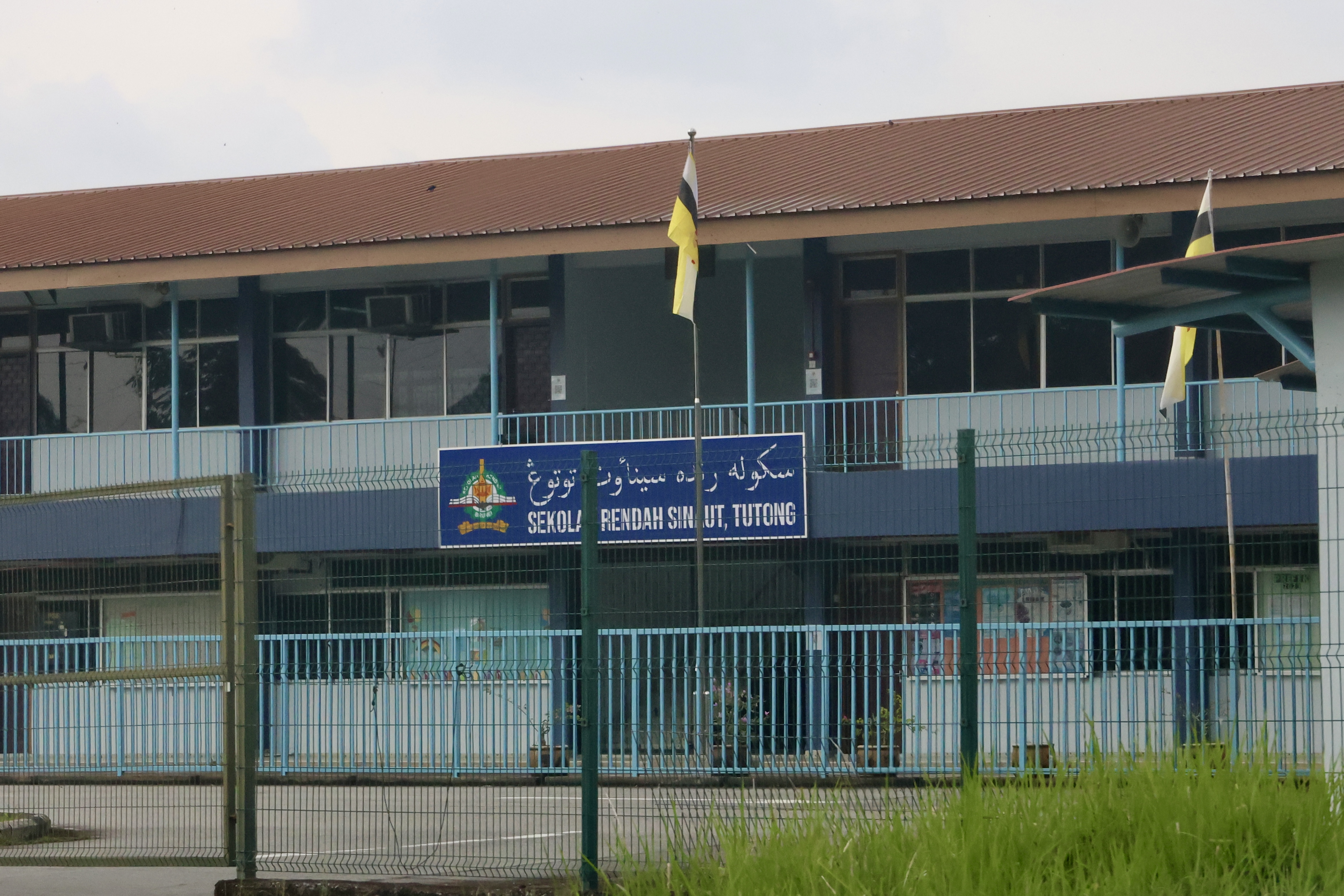
- Sinaut Primary School

- Location in Brunei
- Coordinates: 4°48′56″N 114°44′48″E
- Country: Brunei
- District: Tutong
- Mukim: Keriam

Government
  - Village head: Masri Mohamad

Population (2016)
  - Total: 932
- Time zone: UTC+8 (BNT)
- Postcode: TB1741

Kampong Sinaut is a village in Tutong District, Brunei, about 12 kilometres (7.5 mi) from the district town Pekan Tutong. The population was 932 in 2016. It is one of the villages within Mukim Keriam.

== Facilities ==
The village primary school is Sinaut Primary School. It also shares grounds with Sinaut Religious School, the village school for the country's Islamic religious primary education.

Kampong Sinaut Mosque is the village mosque; it was inaugurated on 7 December 1979 and can accommodate 500 worshippers.
