= Kampong Mentiri =

Village in Brunei

Mentiri Kampung Mentiri
- Village
- Kampong Mentiri
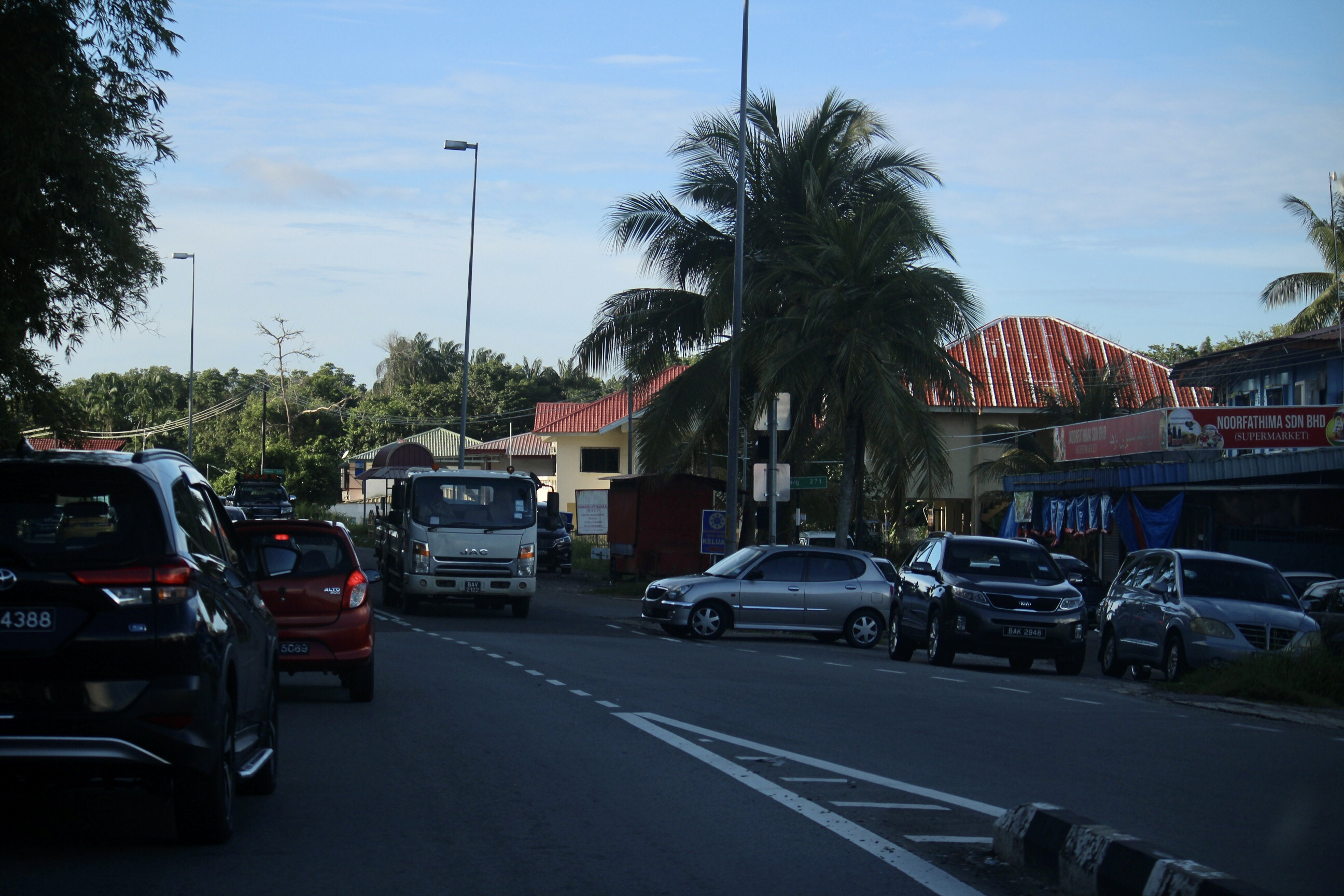

- Location in Brunei
- Coordinates: 4°58′13″N 115°01′15″E
- Country: Brunei
- District: Brunei-Muara
- Mukim: Mentiri

Government
  - Village head: Bujang Sabtu (Area 1); Mohammad Nizam (Area 2)

Area
  - Total: 322.29 ha (796.4 acres)

Population (2016)
  - Total: 1,215
  - Density: 377.0/km^{2} (976.4/sq mi)
- Postcode: BU1929
- Website: kg-mentiri.blogspot.com

Kampong Mentiri (Malay: Kampung Mentiri) or simply known as Mentiri, is a village in the north-east of Brunei-Muara District, Brunei. It has an area of 322.29 hectares (796.4 acres); the population was 1,215 in 2016.

== Etymology ==
The village is named after Mentiri, an obscure and unusual tree. The tree might also have magical properties for a Brunei place name. According to legend, Kampong Mentiri gets its name from a large, ancient tree. The village elders claimed that the trunk's size was so great that it required six adults to hold hands to reach around it. This tree was special and rumored to possess magical abilities. Nonetheless, it must be acknowledged that no one can name this tree now. Elderly members of the community claimed that it was once situated where the current roundabout sits.

The village has gone under numerous names in the past. Kampong Mentiri has also been known as Kampong Pancur Buluh, Kampong Batu Buluh, Kampong Kiau, and Kampong Sungai Sinonok in the past.

== Geography ==
Kampong Mentiri is one of the villages in Mukim Mentiri, a mukim in Brunei-Muara District. As a village subdivision, it borders Kampong Sungai Buloh to the north, Kampong Batu Marang to the northeast, RPN Kampong Mentiri to the east, Kampong Pangkalan Sibabau to the southeast, Kampong Sungai Besar to the south and RPN Panchor Mengkubau to the west.

== History ==
Archaeologists were shocked to find significant artefacts that demonstrated the region was occupied as early as before the 12th century during working on the Mengkubau Dam in 1997. According to a Berita Muzium article from the January–April 1998 issue, archaeologists found pieces of broken Chinese Vases from the Song dynasty. Additional fragments found in the same location ranged in age from the 13th to the 19th centuries. Together with the vases, shell fragments were discovered.

Three nearby outdated graveyards were also listed in the same piece. The people called two of these Muslim cemeteries Kubur Sulasih and Kubur Bagunjai, but the third went unidentified. There were about 20 gravestones discovered at Kubur Sulasih. There were just two gravestones in Kubur Bagunjai, and both of them were for the same grave. The graveyards' presence indicated that locals were present at the time. The ownership of the cemeteries is unknown. The two gravestones at Kubur Bagunjai received extensive inspection from the archaeologists. The presence of two burial markers, or batu nisan, showed the eminence of the deceased.

The government, working through the Brunei and Muara District Department, began building a short road that led to Kampong Sungai Besar in the 1960s. The road connecting Kampong Mentiri and Jalan Muara was also constructed in 1968, and since then the village's population has grown, reaching 1,121 individuals and 186 homes at that time. The Government of Brunei has built Jalan Utama Mentiri, which connects Bandar Seri Begawan and several of the villages in the area, which undoubtedly provides comfort to the residents of the village in particular and to all people in this country in general, especially with the existence of telecommunications. As a result, Kampong Mentiri is also experiencing an increasingly rapid development year after year.

The British Resident aimed to promote land ownership, particularly for the cultivation of rice and other agricultural products, and the majority of the village lands were registered at this time. The village elders recall that there were not any concrete houses in the middle of the 1940s. Back then, every home was modest and constructed of wood. These homes had split bamboo walls, bulian wood stilts, and thatched nipah palm roofs. To supply the inhabitants with water, wells were drilled. They transported their rice harvest and other farm items to Brunei Town to be sold. The hamlet only had a few modest grocery stores in the 1970s. The number began to rise by the middle of the 1980s, and shophouse construction is still ongoing in the village today. Local customers are currently served by a department store and a global fast food restaurant.

== Economy ==
The loss of the original residents' primary livelihood, rice farming, comes with the village's opening to the outside world. The village's rice production had almost completely ceased by the 1970s.

Along with being involved in the community, Majlis Perundingan Kampung (MPK) Mentiri also works to improve the income and standard of living for the villagers through economic ventures like the sale of flower pots, agricultural goods, weaving, carpentry, fisheries, and monthly sales stall activities. The monthly sales activity, one of the economic activities carried out by MPK, is one that is increasingly implemented and worked on. It takes place at the end of every month in the open space of the village's recreational park. There are a variety of sales there as well, including plants, crops, fruits, vegetables, handicrafts, as well as some prepared and raw sea food like fish, fresh prawns, shellfish, and so on. At the conclusion of the month, a number of sporting events were also arranged to keep the booths lively, including sports and coloring sessions for both adults and children. The public is invited to stop by the monthly sales booth since it will be beneficial to do so given the variety of goods that are offered there from 8 am to 8 pm.

The MPK Mentiri Women's Bureau is active and skilled in cooking traditional dishes. They participate in the Program Selera Kampung Kitani (SKK), which was run by the Department of Information. They served up some traditional fare like budu tibadak, kunau cooked with turmeric, salted fish with chili and rice, meat cooked with turmeric, sweet potato sprouts cooked in fat, sweet potato sticks/tajak, bananas, gualai tibadak, and sweets.

== Demography ==
The majority of the village's initial residents were Kedayans. Nonetheless, as with other villages in Brunei, the community now hosts residents of various races as a result of its opening to the outside world.

== Transportation ==
Although being only 6 kilometres (3.7 mi) from Muara and 12 kilometers from Brunei Town, the settlement had no road connecting it. The river served as the only exit from the settlement, leading north to Muara and south to Brunei Town. There was no road to Mentiri even in the 1960s when the road from Brunei Town had reached Muara. Those from the villages who were traveling to Brunei Town walked up to Bukit Sibanging and boarded a bus along Jalan Muara. It took until 1972 for the Jalan Kota Batu road between Mentiri and Brunei Town to be finished. The road needed to be finished due to a variety of developments.

== Infrastructure ==
Like other settlements around the nation, Kampong Mentiri is not falling behind in getting infrastructural facilities. With the presence of several shopping centers and complexes, retail stores, workshops, a car company workshop, and a gas station, a safe and orderly road system has a positive impact on Kampong Mentiri's surrounding areas in terms of economic and industrial development.

=== Government ===
- Mentiri Fire Station covers the entire mukim of Mentiri as part of the 10th National Development Plan. It is built on a 3.21 acre (1.23 hectare) site with the construction project costing BND$7,805,189.90 and was completed on 30 May 2013.
- Pusat Kemasyarakatan Perpindahan Mentiri began construction on 26 February 1996 and completed on 25 May 1997. The community centre hall can accommodate up to 400 people. Facilities available in the hall include 3 badminton courts, 8 units of shop space, 1 activity room, 1 sports room and 2 offices.
- Mentiri Post Office was built on a site with an area of 0.5581 hectares with a construction cost of BND$358,600. It began to be built on 30 January 2003 and was inaugurated on 19 March 2007. In October 2013, the post office received the 'Anugerah Pejabat Pos Penyerahan Terbaik' in conjunction with World Post Day.

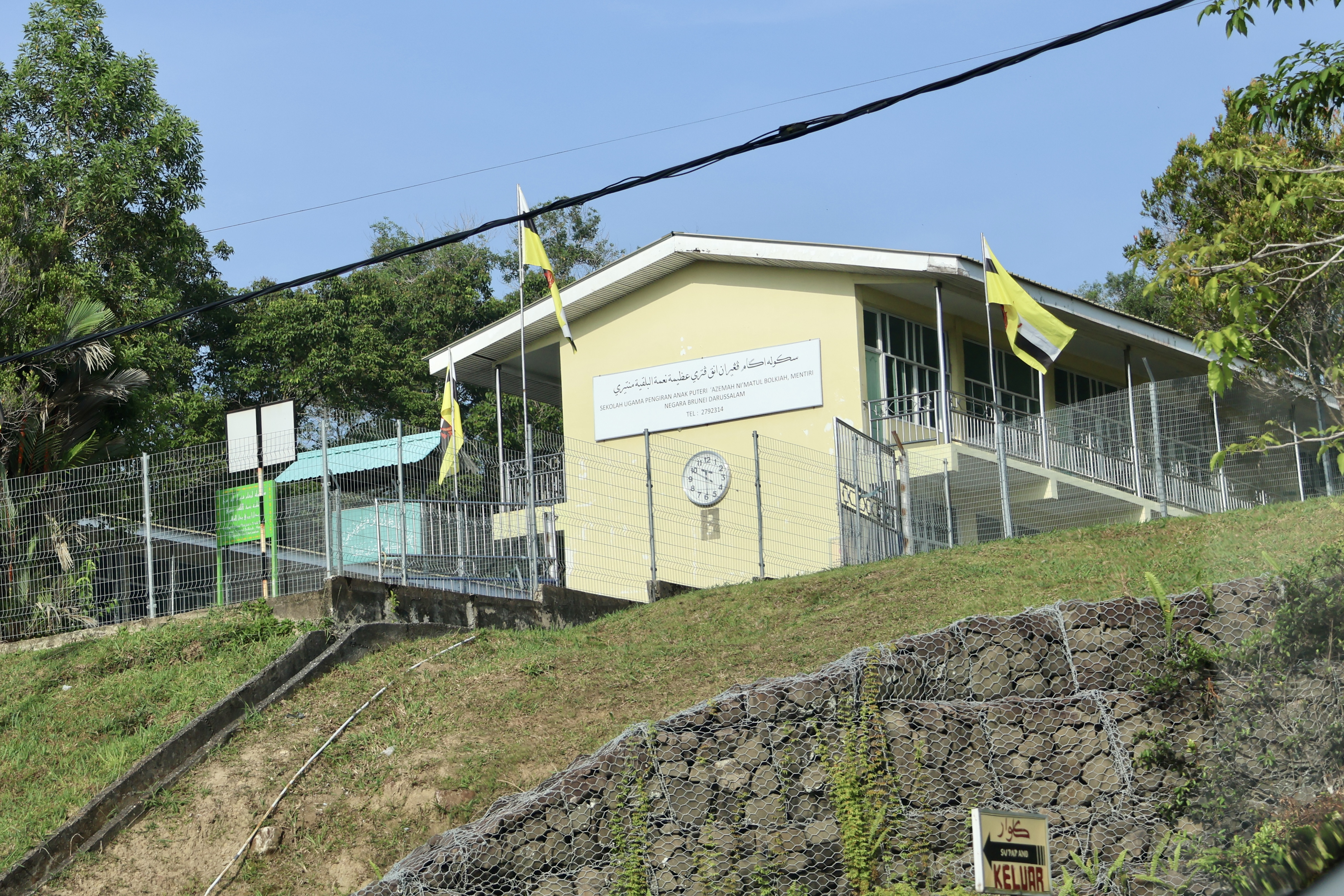
Pengiran Anak Puteri 'Azemah Ni'matul Bolkiah Religious School in 2023

=== Education ===
Schools in Kampong Mentiri include:

- Mentiri Primary School, a government primary school.
- Dato Mohd Yassin Primary School, a government primary school.
- Pengiran Anak Puteri 'Azemah Ni'matul Bolkiah Religious School, a primary religious school for the Muslim resident.
- Pehin Datu Seri Maharaja Secondary School, sole secondary school in the mukim.

=== Mosque ===
Kampong Mentiri Mosque is the village mosque; it was inaugurated on 27 January 1984 and can accommodate 600 worshippers.

=== Recreation ===
Pantai Mentiri Golf Club (PMGC) was the venue for 20th SEA Games in 1999.

Bukit Mentiri (Mentiri Hill) was developed and has been used for activities like hillclimbing since it opened a few years ago. As part of Brunei's 24th National Day Celebration and with the involvement of over 150 individuals, MPK organized the Bukit Mentiri Climbing Challenge in 2008. This event, among other things, aims to inspire people to embrace a healthy lifestyle via athletics. They may pick from two routes that are available on the hill, the 2.8 km and 3.7 km routes, by ascending a number of hills that are covered in flora and wildlife and preserve the natural ecosystem.
