= Transport in Brunei =

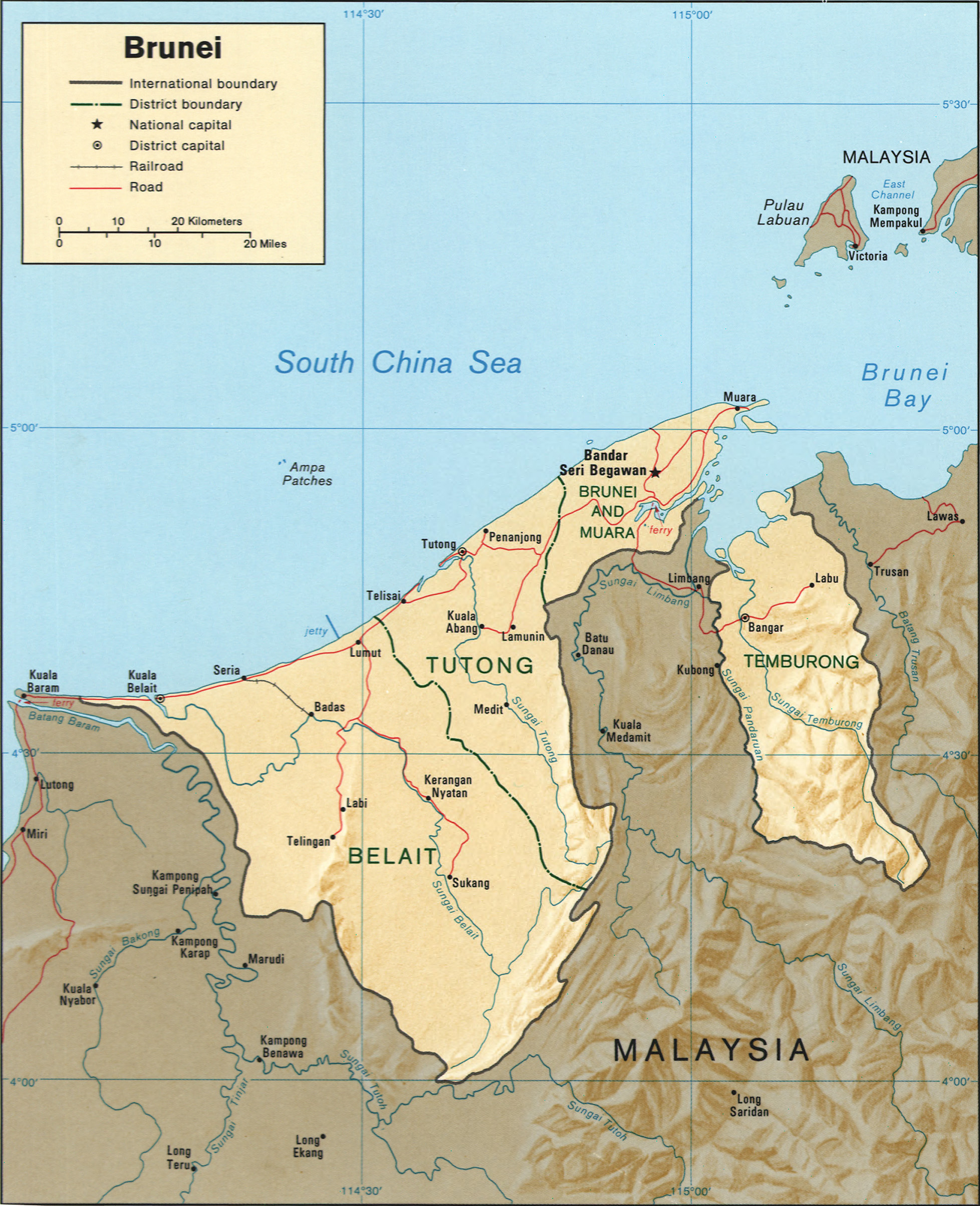
Map of Brunei's transportation network in 1984.

Transport in Brunei consists of air, land, and sea transport. Previously there was some rail transport in Brunei, but eventually most of it was closed down. Several public and commercial sector organizations are in charge of creating and overseeing these networks and infrastructures. The Ministry of Transport and Infocommunications (MTIC) is in charge of overseeing the maritime and aviation industries, as well as planning and regulating all kinds of land transportation.

== Road transport ==
The Land Transport Department (JPD) is the government agency to make sure that the transportation systems and services in Brunei and the surrounding area are readily available, effective, safe, and satisfactory for the movement of people and products.

=== Roads ===
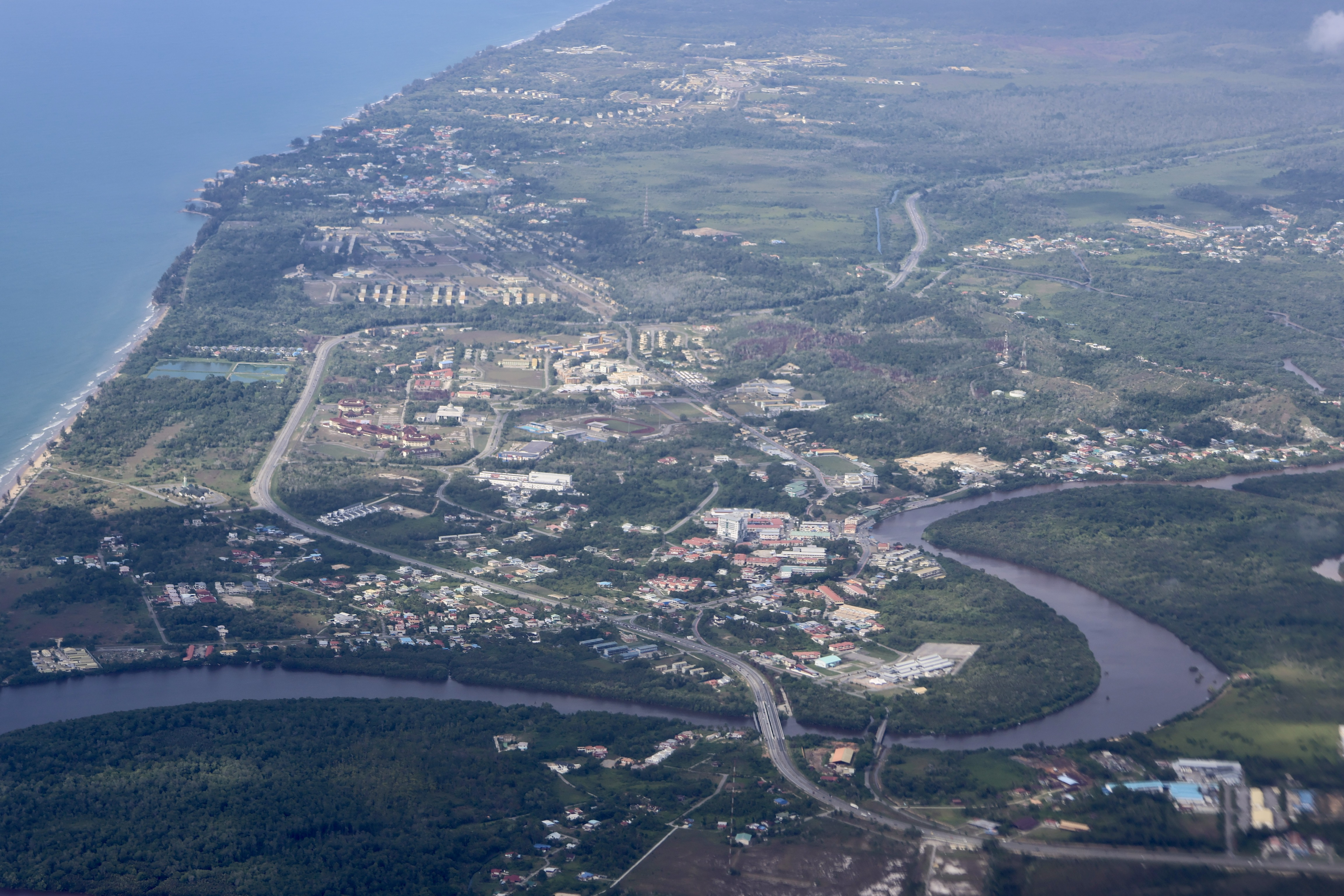
Tutong–Telisai Highway running from Telisai to Tutong by-passing through its town, crossing the Tutong River.

The current Brunei National Roads System consists of a vast national highway network, along with related facilities like gas stations, rest areas, and land border crossings; a waterway network that is significant at several key locations; an urban and interdistrict public transportation bus network based on franchised and commercial services, along with associated stops and interchanges. There are 216,000 licensed motor vehicles as of 2013, the majority of which are private cars. With an annual vehicle growth rate of 9%, there are over 1,400 newly registered private vehicles per month. When compared to other countries, it shows extraordinarily high levels of car ownership, use, and dependency.

With 3,167 kilometres (1,968 mi) of roads throughout Brunei, the highway network dominates the country's transportation infrastructure. The backbone of the network is a coastal roadway that connects the towns of Kuala Belait, Sungai Liang, Tutong, and Jerudong with Muara Port from the south-west of the nation to the north-east. From here, important routes weave through Brunei-Muara and connect with Bandar Seri Begawan. The more remote areas of Labi in Belait, Lamunin in Tutong, and Bangar in Temburong are all served by important routes that branch off the main corridor. Brunei-Muara and Temburong are not connected by a direct road. There are roads that connect the two, however they only run via the Malaysian District of Limbang. There was no road connecting Brunei Town and Kuala Belait in 1953. To get to Danau, one must go all the way to Kuala Tutong and board a ferry there. To go to Kuala Belait from Danau, one must carefully travel along the beach until approximately Anduki.

=== Bridges ===
With the opening of the $139 million Raja Isteri Pengiran Anak Hajah Saleha Bridge on 14 October 2017, the 750 metres (2,460 ft) long bridge connecting Mukim Lumapas with the capital was officially opened by Sultan Hassanal Bolkiah. The structure, which was constructed as a joint venture between the local company Swee and South Korea's Daelim Industrial, is the second-longest single-pylon cable-stayed bridge in the world. The flyover was anticipated to relieve commuter traffic between Lumapas and Bandar Seri Begawan. The current Jalan Bengkurong Masin and Jalan Tutong highways are used by more than 18,000 drivers each day that commute from Mukim Lumapas and the adjacent villages.

The Temburong District and Bandar Seri Begawan are connected by the 26.3 km Sultan Haji Omar Ali Saifuddien Bridge, which was inaugurated on 17 March 2020. The bridge reduces the commute time for locals to the capital to under 30 minutes. Travelers from Temburong previously had to take a 45-minute boat ride across the bay or drive two hours through Limbang, Sarawak, and four border checks in order to reach the capital before the bridge's opening. Later that same year on 14 September, it has allowed foreign vehicles to cross the bridge with the exception of those weighing more than 3,500 kg.

== Rail transport ==
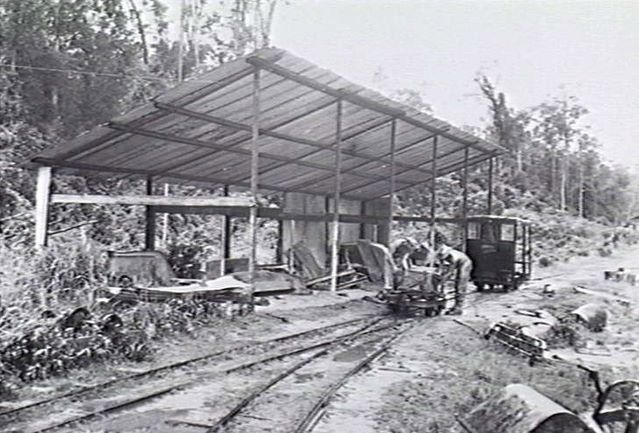
Badas railway station with a flatcar seen being loaded with food rations by the Australian Army in 1945.

The Brooketon Colliery and Muara Port, a distance of about 2.5 km, were connected by the first railway in Brunei when it was built in the 1880s. To enable the use of steam locomotives, steel rails were added to the original timber tramroad at the start of the 1890s. To permit their use in the mine galleries, two unique locomotives were built with a low profile and the unusually short gauge of 711 millimetres (28.0 in). Since 1924, the mine and its railway were abandoned. Several of the remnants are still inaccessible due to the resurgence of dense natural foliage.

A 600 millimetres (24 in) gauge railway was built in the early 1930s by Royal Dutch Shell (now Brunei Shell Petroleum) to span the approximate 19 km between its Seria refinery and a water pumping station at Badas. It transported both water and building supplies. The line was taken apart and the equipment was concealed during World War II to protect it from advancing Japanese soldiers. The railway was repaired by Australian forces when the island of Borneo was liberated in 1945. Several sources claim that it was still in use well into the early years of the twenty-first century. The path between Seria and Badas is now a road, and it's thought that some of the track is still in place. With a 4 km pier serving an ocean going tanker loading point, Brunei LNG constructed a liquefied natural gas plant at Lumut in the early 1970s. The pier includes gas pipelines as well as a 1533 mm gauge railway for the transportation of workers and supplies.

As of 21 June 2021, A proposed LRT or MRT transportation system called the Brunei Metro has been taken into consideration for Bandar Seri Begawan. Official announcements have been made over the years, but nothing is currently being substantially developed. There are hardly enough people in Brunei, a microstate with a population of just over 400,000, to warrant the construction of an urban railway. Despite this, it is one of the nations with the highest per capita incomes in the world, and the government has long explored implementing some type of urban rail transit.

== Air transport ==
The Department of Civil Aviation (DCA), a governmental agency that regulates aviation issues, is in charge of managing and operating Brunei International Airport, country's main international entry point, in a safe, secure, and effective manner. The goal is to make sure that rules and regulations on safety and security are carefully upheld and followed, in accordance with national laws and regulations as well as the ICAO's Standard and Recommended practices.

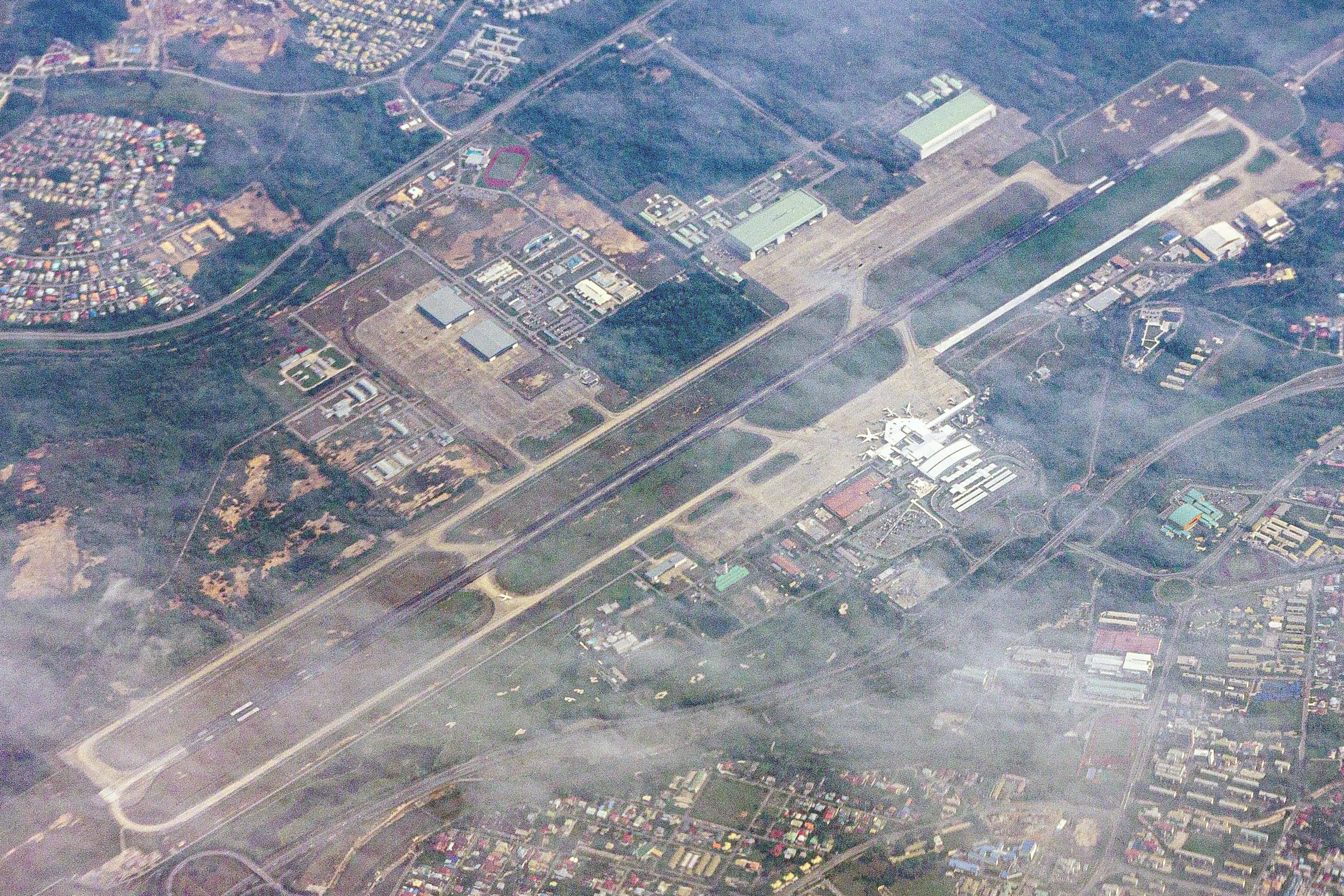
Aerial view of Brunei International Airport in Bandar Seri Begawan.

=== Airports ===
The first runway was built at the existing Government Offices Complex, Old Airport during the Japanese occupation during the Second World War. Despite being heavily shelled by the Allied Forces during the war, the runway was rebuilt and repaired, and an appropriate airport was designed and constructed. The first internal air service linkages linking Brunei Town and Anduki marked the start of commercial air travel in Brunei in 1953.

The Anduki Airfield is a domestic airstrip in Seria, that mostly serves as a heliport. Operating and maintaining it is Brunei Shell Petroleum (BSP).

The primary international entry point for the country is at the Brunei International Airport. additionally, it is the main hub of the national airline Royal Brunei Airlines. There is only one passenger terminal at the airport, which is utilized for both domestic and international flights. In 2005, it carried 1.3 million people.

=== Airlines ===
The nation's sole flag carrier, Royal Brunei Airlines, was founded as an autonomous corporation with 100 percent ownership by the Government of Brunei on 18 November 1974. On 14 May 1975, the first flight from Bandar Seri Begawan to Singapore took off.

== Maritime transport ==
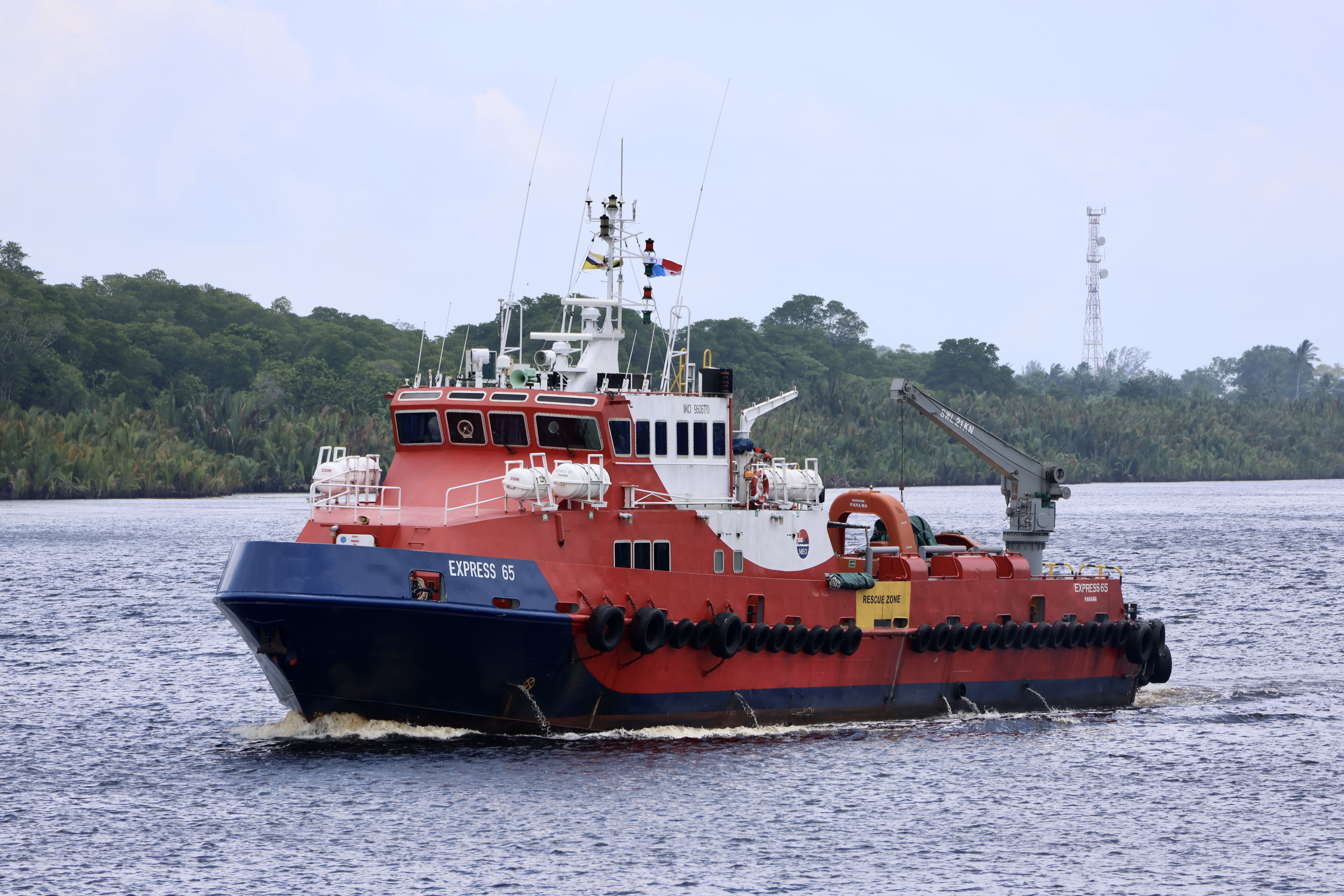
Platform supply ship on the Belait River in 2023.

In September 2017, a corporation called the Maritime and Port Authority of Brunei Darussalam (MPABD) was created. In addition to regulating and controlling navigation within the port's boundaries and along its approaches, MPABD serves to enhance port efficiency and development. The MPA also performs licensing and regulatory duties with regard to commerce ships, notably with regard to maritime safety.

As of 2017, Brunei has 273 licensed boats and approximately 290 kilometres (180 mi) of navigable waterways. However, the network's current use is primarily restricted to the area around Kampong Ayer (water village), which is located across the Brunei River from Bandar Seri Begawan. Currently, water taxis transport people and small amounts of products from the capital to the water village for extended stretches of the day. Moreover, water transportation is used in Brunei's more isolated settlements located in the country's interior, where poor or nonexistent road links exist. Due to the lack of direct road connections mentioned above, travel from Brunei-Muara to Temburong was previously only possible via river. The water network in this context emphasizes its significance to Brunei's ability to operate, trade, and maintain its territorial integrity.

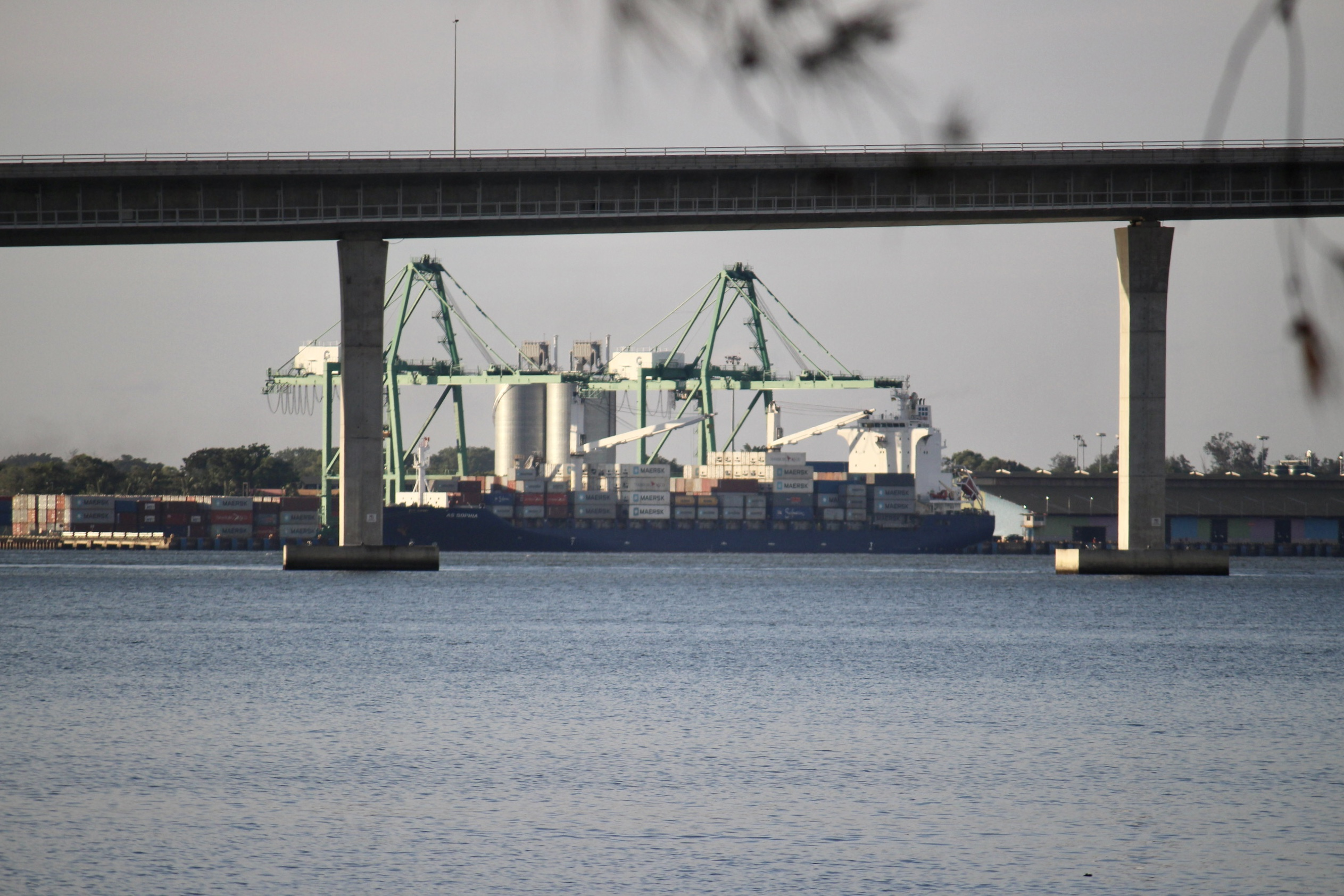
Containers being unloaded from a cargo ship by two of Muara Port's cranes in 2022.

=== Ports and harbours ===
Muara Port is located about 28 kilometres (17 mi) from Pusat Bandar. There is a minimum sea depth of 12.5 meters and a berth length of 250 meters at the Muara container terminal. Two Panamax quay cranes are available for use at the Muara Container Terminal. The dedicated container wharf's facilities cover 92,034 square meters and have a capacity of 220,000 TEUs per year. The linear berth at the Muara Conventional Terminal is 611 meters long with a 12.5 meter draught, and the aggregate berth is 87 meters long with a 5.2 meter draught.

The Rasau gas fields are near to the Kuala Belait Port, and Shell has numerous facilities to help with oil and gas production. Cooking gas and chemicals are supplied to the manufacturing facilities and residents of the town by the Kuala Belait fueling station. The terminal building, which is located on the southern end of the harbor, provides its clients with logistics support. The port has a shipyard where tankers, light transport ships, and fishing boats can be built. Offering services for maintenance, repair, and painting are its three workshops. Two operational zones make up the Kuala Belait port. The petroleum pier is 30 meters long and 12.5 meters deep alongside. It is equipped with five mobile cranes that can lift 25 tons, electricity, and freshwater. Farther upstream, close to Kampong Sungai Duhon, is where Kuala Belait's commercial port is located. Unfortunately, the port is now only open to shallow-draft vessels due to an excessive buildup of silt and sediment. To stop silting at the river mouth, the harbor was recently dredged, and two major breakwaters were built.

=== Ferry ===
In Serasa on the shores of Brunei Bay sits the country's primary ferry terminal, Serasa Ferry Terminal. Four times per day, the terminal handles frequent return Roll-On Roll-Off (RoRo) services to Labuan, and less frequently to Menumbok, Sabah, for travelers and vehicles traveling to Kota Kinabalu.

== See also ==
- Vehicle registration plates of Brunei
