= Rail transport in Brunei =

Brunei
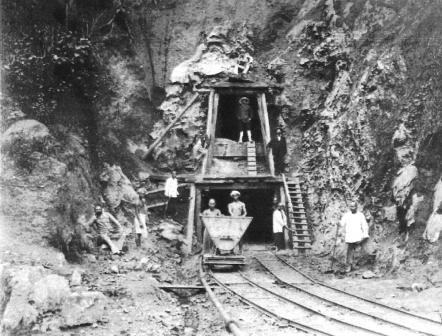
- Brooketon Colliery, end of 19th century

Rail transport in Brunei played a minor role during its development.

== Narrow gauge railway of Brooketon Colliery ==
Brooketon Colliery in the sub-district Serasa operated a 2.5 km long narrow gauge railway with the unusual gauge of 711 millimetres (2 feet 4.0 inches) from the colliery to the deepwater harbour near Muara. Wooden rails were used, until steel rails were laid, so that two 0-4-0 steam locomotives of Andrew Barclay Sons & Co. could be used.

The locomotive with the serial No 696 was built in 1891 and had an inner frame, a wheel diameter of 559 millimetres (1 foot 10.0 inches), outer cylinders with a capacity of 178 mm × 356 mm (7.0 in × 14.0 in) and a height of only 1,753 millimetres (5 feet 9.0 inches), to be used in the1,829 mm (6.001 ft) high mine shaft. She had the name MARGUERITE REINE after Sir Charles Brookes' French wife Margaret de Windt. An identical Barclay locomotive with the serial No 815 was built in 1897 and was named BROOKETON. It was despatched in January 1898 from Glasgow.

The rail track was nearly completely lifted, but there are some mine shafts, overgrown remains of tracks and locomotives, which are protected under the Antiquities and Treasure Trove Act of Brunei Darussalam. The department of museums of Brunei plans, to exhibit them in an open-air museum, to support eco-tourism.

Between 1888 and 1924 approximately 650.000 t of Brooketon coal was transported, which was on high demand by the steam boats during their stop-over on the lucrative trip from India to China. The colliery and its railway were decommissioned by 1924. During World War II the Japanese operated the coal mine once again for local use.

== Narrow gauge railway Seria–Badas ==
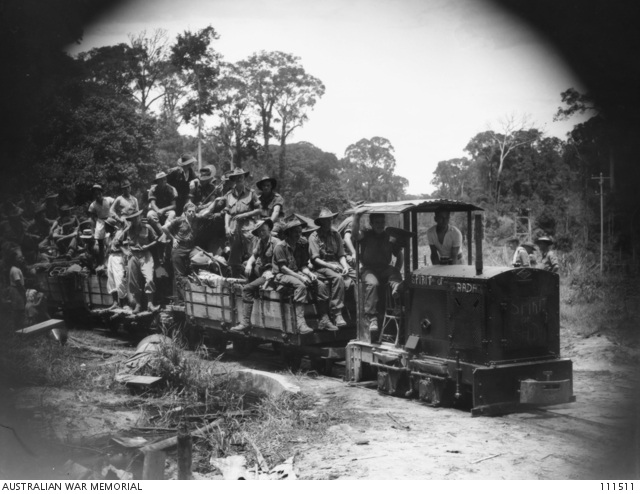
Australian soldiers operating the narrow gauge railway in Seria, 1945.

Since the 1930s existed a 19.3 kilometres (12.0 miles) long narrow gauge railway with a gauge of mit 600 mm from Seria to Badas. The alignment of the railway with wooden rails was built by the British Malayan Petroleum Company (BMP, now Brunei Shell Petroleum), to transport water from a pumping station in Badas, which was operated by George William Percival Clark at the Sungai Belait River, to Seria. It was subsequently used, to transport pipeline tubes.

The employees of BMP hid during World War II the most important parts of the railway from the Japanese, who consequently couldn't operate it. After liberation by the 9th Division of the Australian Army the hidden parts re-appeared in July 1945, and the railway was quickly re-commissioned, to transport two 25-pound howitzers and their ammunition to Badas, to disperse Japanese troops, which were still in the area.

According to some reports, the railway was still being used in 1999. The tracks are still ^{(2013)} in use for transporting trees and as a walkway.

== Industrial railway of Brunei LNG ==
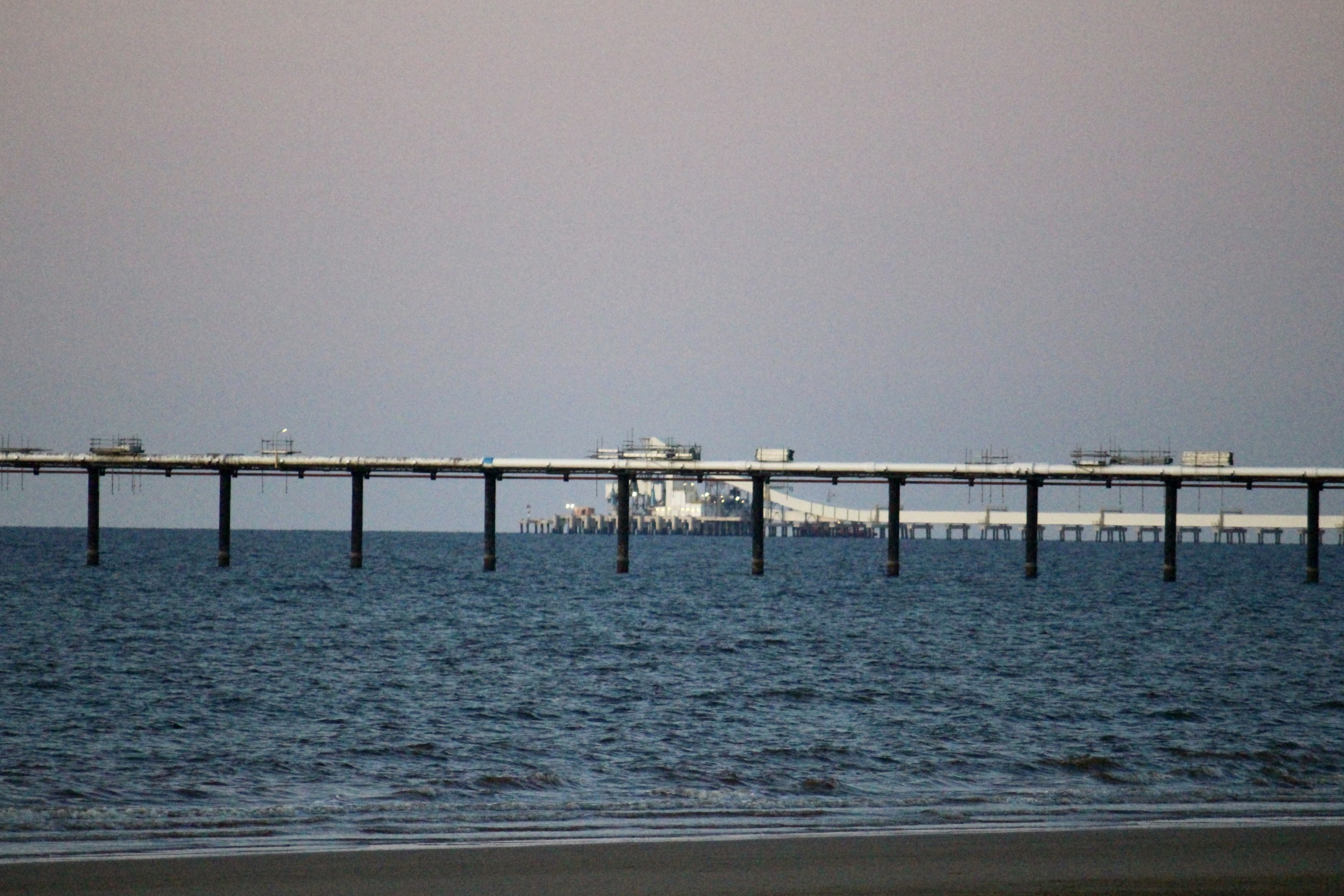
The loading pier of Brunei LNG plant (foreground) in Lumut.

In the LNG loading pier of Brunei LNG (BLNG) plant in Lumut, Brunei, a Joint Venture of the government of Brunei (50%), Shell Overseas Trading (25%) and Mitsubishi (25%), a broad gauge industrial railway is used with the unusual gauge of 1533 mm (60 1/3 in).

Bemo Rail of Warmenhuizen in the Netherlands laid the track onto the pier for transporting workers and equipment to the platform, which is 4 km away from the coastline, at which tankers can be filled with LNG, because they cannot come closer to the coast because the water is very shallow. Bemo also supplied two battery operated rail vehicles made in 1993 and 1997/98, as well as a motorless passenger car and some flat cars for tools. The locomotives get their energy from batteries and are explosion proof, for instance with stainless steel wheels. They can transport 10 passengers each. The original description was RCE-15 (Rail Car Electric, 15 kN (1,5 t) pulling force). Now it has been renamed to BRE-15 (Bemo Rail Electric). The maximum speed is 15 km/h. In 1999 the first locomotive was equipped, similarly to the second locomotive, with an AC asynchron motoro instead of the DC motor. Two older explosion proof rail cars and trailers were delivered by Alan Keef in England.

== Trans-Borneo Railway ==
The 4,400 kilometres (2,700 miles) long Trans Borneo Railway is still being planned. Sarawak, Brunei, Sabah and Kalimantan shall be connected, investing a budget of 33 billion US Dollar. Thereby coal, timber and other agricultural produce could be transported from the hinterland of Borneo to the harbour in Bandar Seri Begawan, and from there to world-wide destinations.

== Mass rapid transit ==
Initial plans for a metro in Brunei have so far not been completed. The government of Brunei invited the Malaysian government-owned company Prasarana Malaysia on 18 April 2017, to develop a concept for a metro network.

== Gallery ==
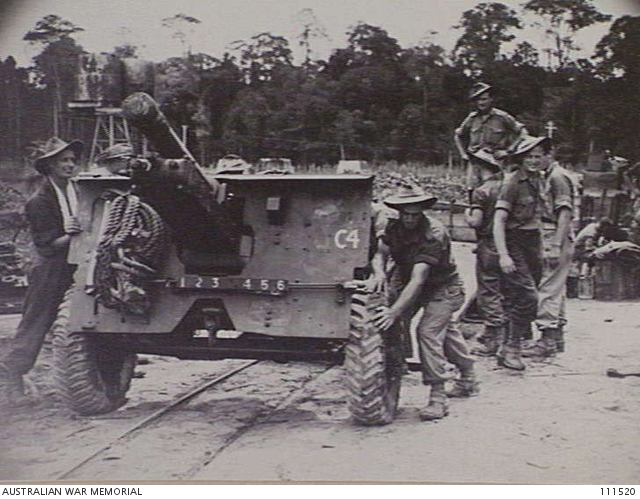
Flatcars being used to transport an Australian Ordnance QF 25-pounder Short in Seria, 1945.

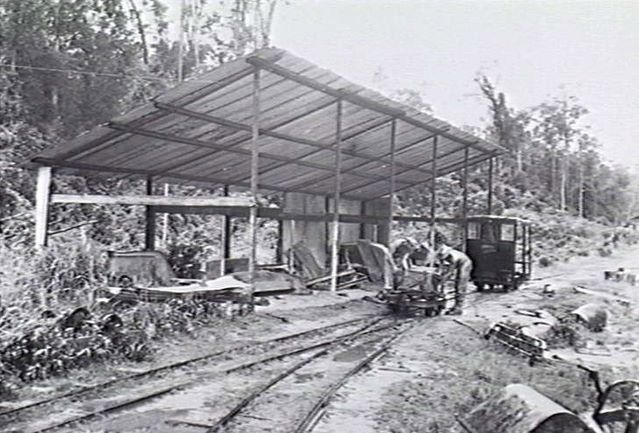
Food rations being loaded up by Australians at Badas railway station in 1945.

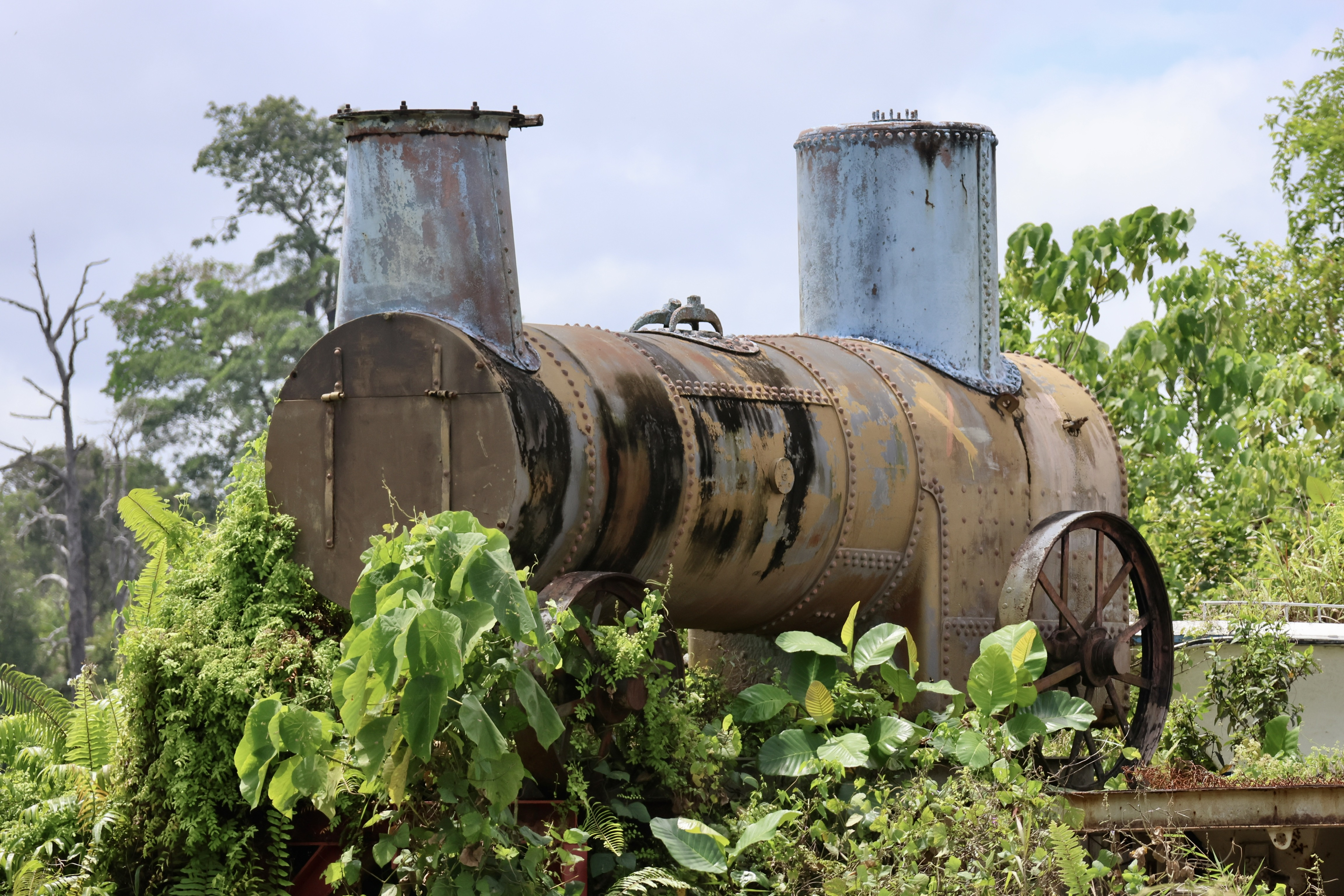
A decommissioned and abandoned round-topped boiler in Kuala Balai.

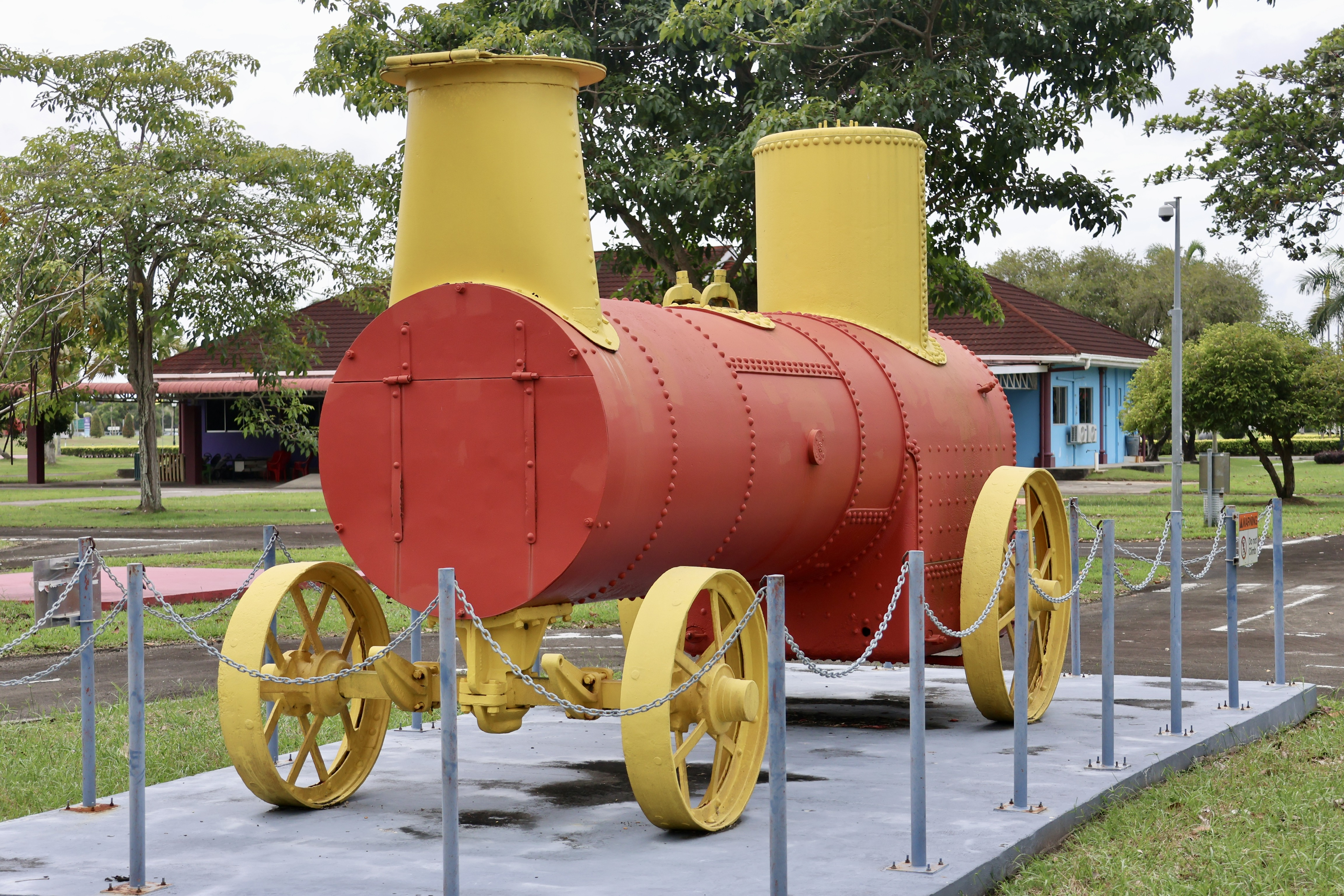
A restored round-topped boiler on display at Seria Energy Lab.

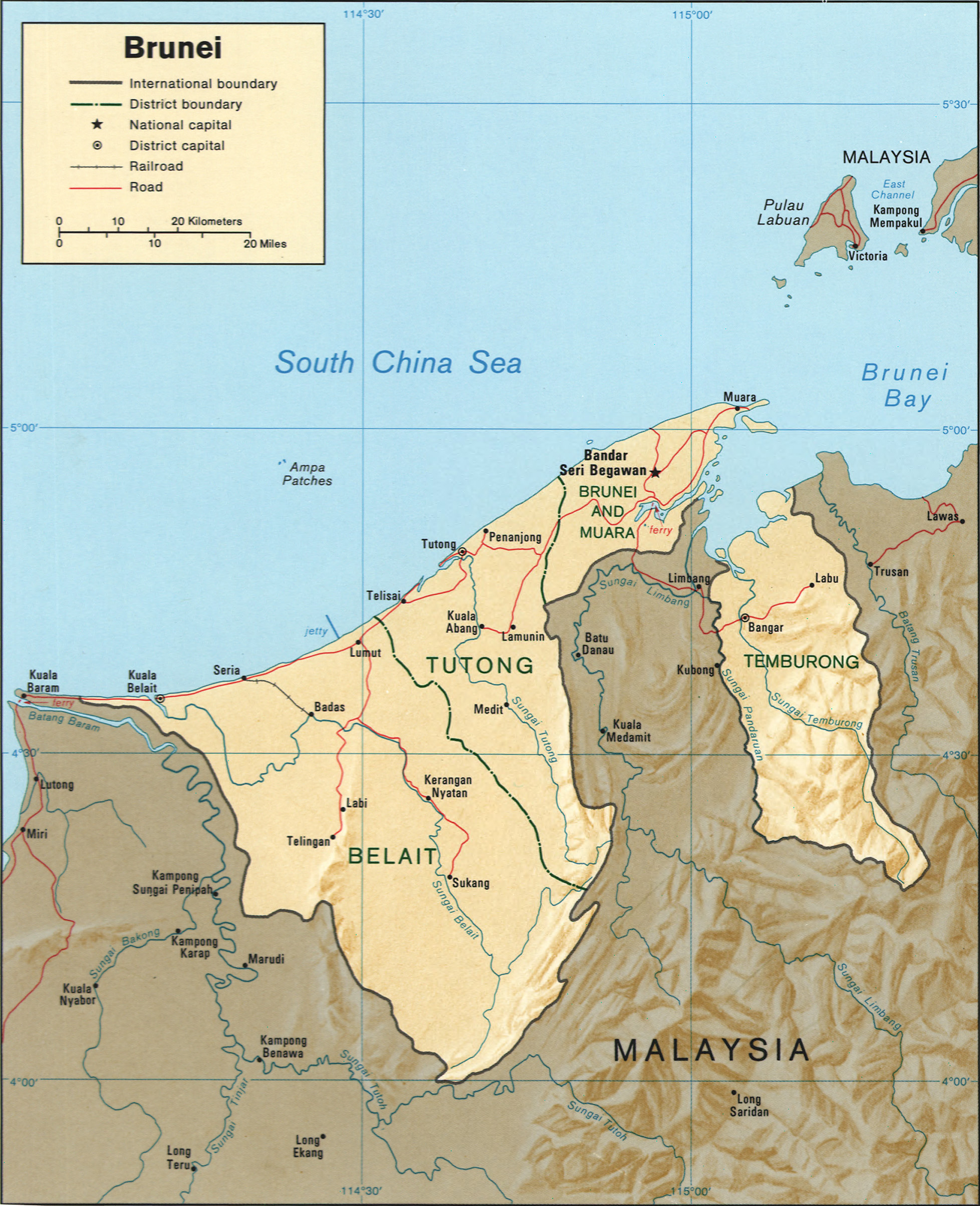
Road and railway networks of Brunei in 1984.

== See also ==
- Transport in Brunei
