= Mukim Telisai =

Mukim of Brunei

- Mukim
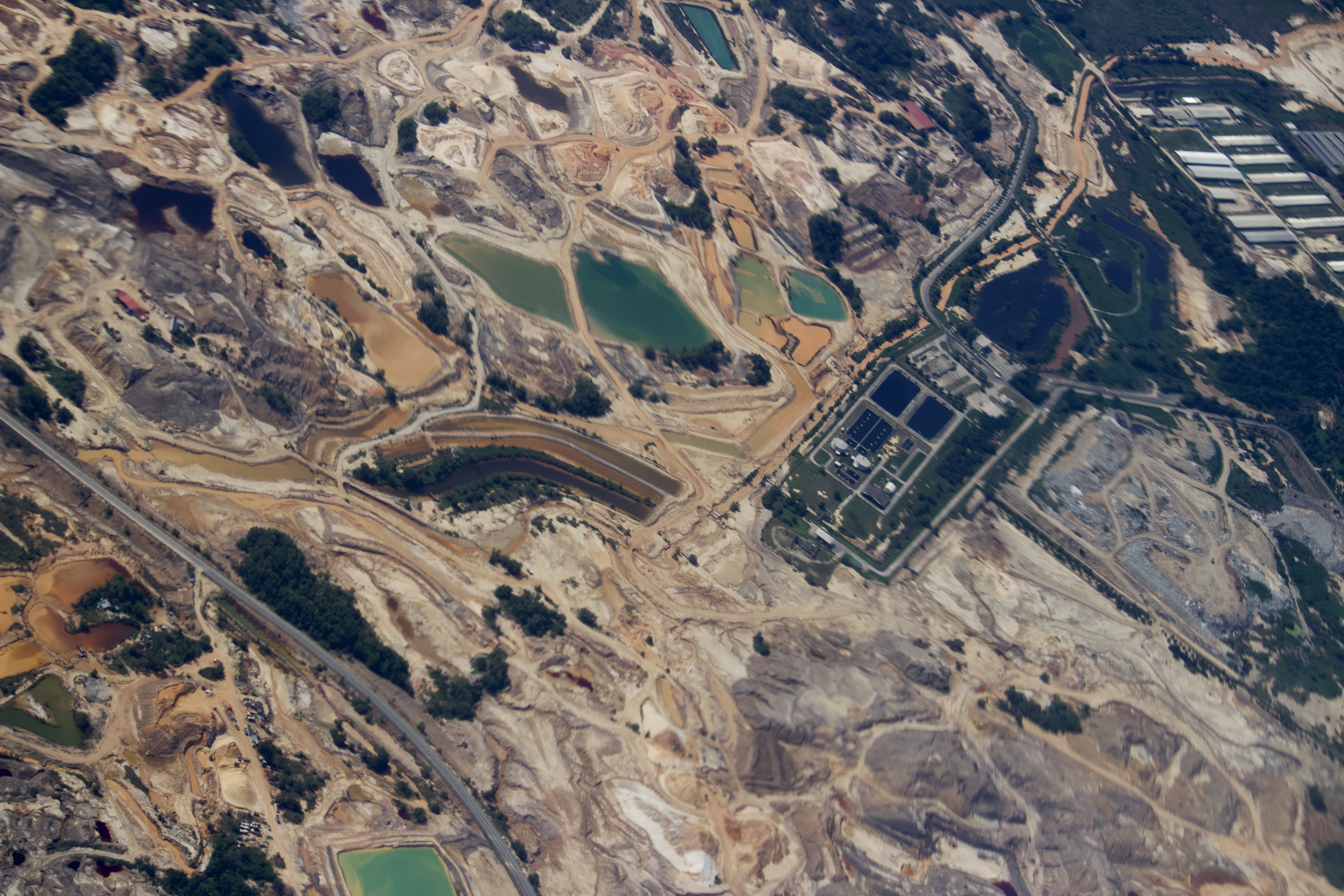
- Sungai Paku

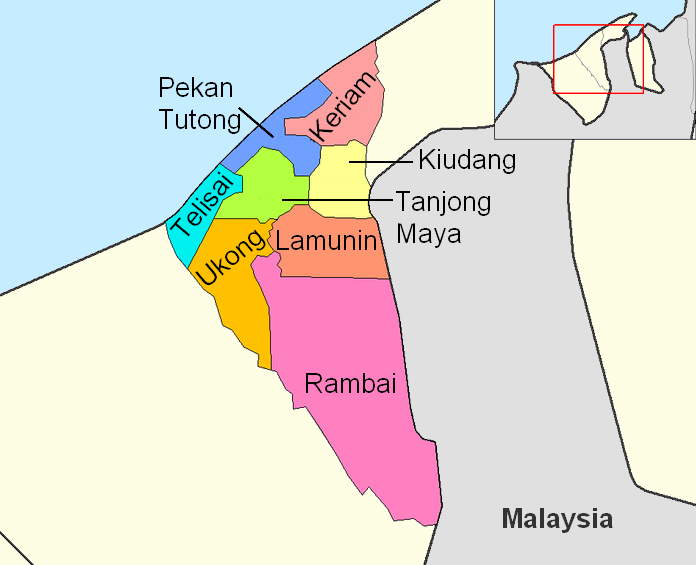
- Telisai is in cyan.
- Coordinates: 4.7342357°N 114.5591496°E
- Country: Brunei
- District: Tutong

Government
  - Penghulu: Haslan Shahbuddin

Population (2021)
  - Total: 13,253
- Time zone: UTC+8 (BNT)
- Postcode: TCxx45

Telisai (Mukim Telisai) is a mukim in Tutong District, Brunei. The population was 10,095 in 2016.

== Etymology ==
The mukim is named after Kampong Telisai, one of the villages it encompasses.

== Geography ==
The mukim is located in the western part of Tutong District, bordering the South China Sea to the north, Mukim Pekan Tutong to the north-east, Mukim Tanjong Maya to the east, Mukim Ukong to the south-east, and Mukim Bukit Sawat and Mukim Liang in Belait District to the south and south-west respectively.

== Demographics ==
As of 2016 census, the population was 10,095 with 51.2% males and 48.8% females. The mukim had 1,768 households occupying 1,768 dwellings. The entire population lived in rural areas.

== Administration ==
As of 2021, the mukim comprised the following villages:

Settlements	Population (2021)	Ketua kampung (2024)
Kampong Bukit Beruang	9,835 (Note: Includes the public housing estate RPN Bukit Beruang)	—N/a
RPN Bukit Beruang	9,835	Moksin bin Haji Moktar
RPN Bukit Beruang Area 1	9,835	Mohammad Sahan bin Mumtazali
RPN Bukit Beruang Area 2	9,835	Azman bin Haji Ismail (Overseer)
RPN Bukit Beruang Area 3	9,835	Azman bin Haji Ismail
RPN Bukit Beruang Area 4	9,835	Azman bin Haji Ismail (Overseer)
Kampong Bukit Pasir	49	—N/a
Kampong Telamba	265	—N/a
Kampong Telisai (Note: Includes the public housing area STKRJ Telisai)	1,802	Sofian bin Haji Md Yusof
Kampong Panapar-Danau	274	—N/a
Kampong Tumpuan Ugas	274	—N/a
Kampong Danau	45	Haji Mahmud bin Haji Johari
Kampong Penyatang	98	—N/a
Kampong Keramut	326	—N/a
Kampong Sungai Paku	274	—N/a
Kampong Pangkalan Dalai	5	—N/a
Kampong Binchaya	6	—N/a
