= Kampong Danau =

Village in Brunei

Danau
- Village
- Kampong Danau
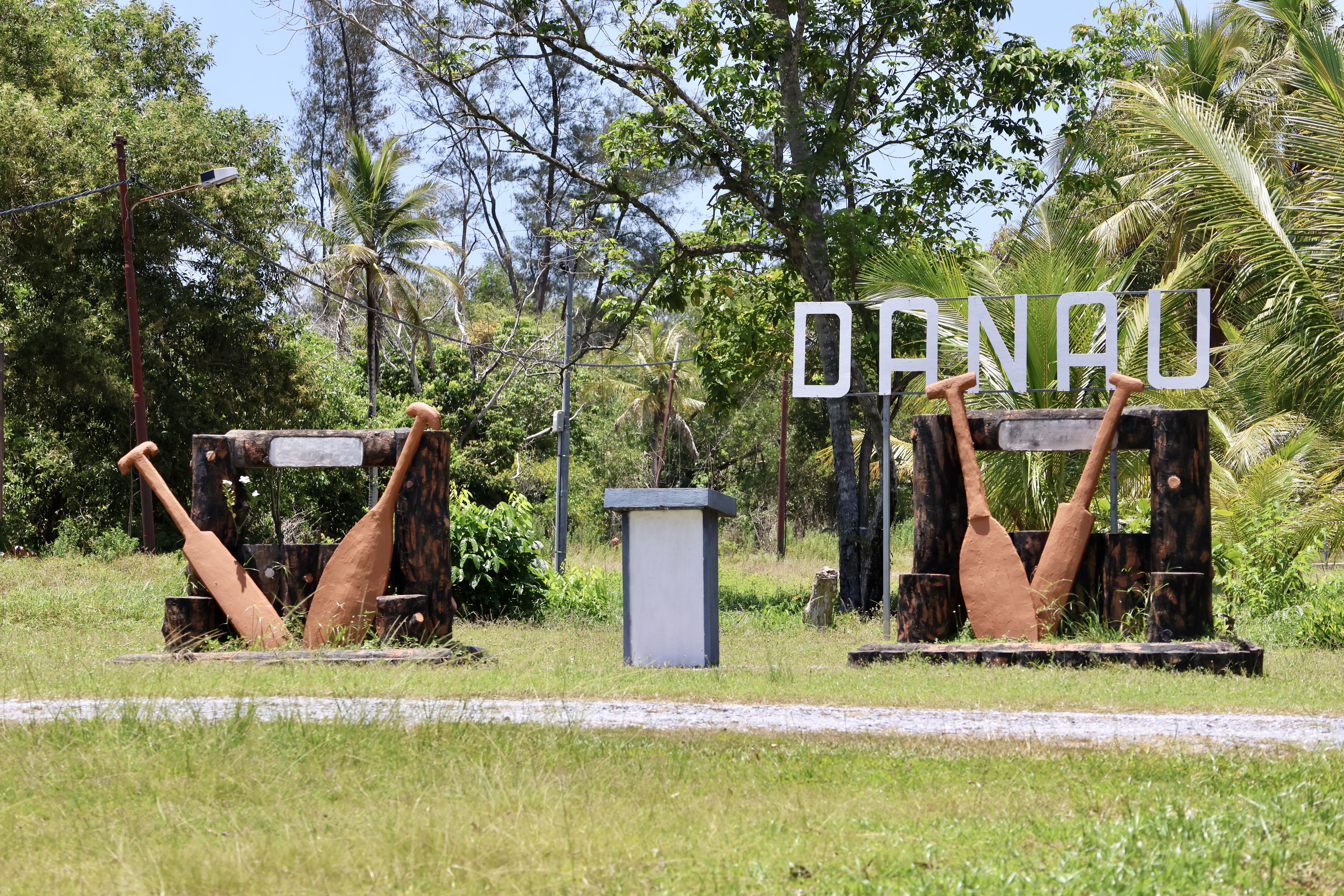
- Danau sign

- Location in Brunei
- Coordinates: 4°45′51″N 114°35′21″E
- Country: Brunei
- District: Tutong
- Mukim: Telisai

Government
  - Village head: Mahmud Johari

Area
  - Total: 6.5023 km^{2} (2.5106 sq mi)

Population (2016) (Note: see Administration section)
  - Total: 1,072
  - Density: 164.9/km^{2} (427.0/sq mi)
- Time zone: UTC+8 (BNT)

Kampong Danau (Malay: Kampung Danau), simply known as Danau, is a coastal village in Tutong District, Brunei, about 21 kilometres (13 mi) from the district town Pekan Tutong. It has a total area of 6.5023 square kilometres (2.5106 sq mi); the total population was 1,072 in 2016. It is one of the villages within Mukim Telisai.

== Etymology ==
The word for lake in Malay and Indonesian is danau, which can be found in topography. According to the legend, a scholar from Sumatra who had served as the local mosque's imam paid a visit to this community. The lake was called Danau by the scholar. Thus, the lake's name persisted, and eventually Kampong Danau came into being. Even if it has slightly altered through time owing to events and situations, this lake or lakes may still be observed now. It is near to the existing Kampong Danau Memorial Monument (Tugu Peringatan Kampung Danau) and not far from Danau River. Water never runs out. It used to be deep and wide here. River water enters this area, especially when the river is high, hence there are many different types of river fish there.

== Geography ==
On 9 February 2016, the Tutong District Office will meet with a number of authorities to discuss how to address the issue of the receding shoreline in Danau. Residents first noticed the erosion last year as waves started to eat into their property. The shoreline was eroded by the waves, which also reduced the length of the beach and caused some homes to be built close to the water. The Tutong District Office announced that the meeting's main topic will be the steps that will be done to help the impacted families.

== History ==
According to a 1938 Colonial Reports, the main route runs from Brunei Town to Tutong, where connectivity with Kuala Belait is maintained by ferry to Danau and then by the beach, the latter of which, at the right times of the tide, serves as an acceptable highway for automobile traffic. Before roads were constructed, vehicles from Kuala Belait and Seria would travel down the seashore. Only when the water was low could these autos move. At some point, every car would reach Danau. There would be a large number of cars arriving to board the ferry to Kuala Tutong. The Tutong Road (Jalan Tutong), which originates there and travels all the way to Brunei Town.

The new twin-screw vehicle ferry Higgins was placed into service in early 1953 when the ferry landing stages at Kuala Tutong and Danau on the main route connecting Brunei and Belait oilfields were finished. It turned out to be a significant improvement over the towed pontoon ferry, which had previously served as the primary route connecting the country's north and south ends. The car ferry that connected Tutong and Danau was given the name Higgins by the Bruneian government as a tribute to Mr. G. O. Higgins. By 1957, the government-owned and -operated car ferry service still runs and therefore establishing the primary connection between the Tutong River-separated country's two sections.

== Administration ==
The village head (ketua kampung) oversees the following villages:

Village	Population (2016)	Postcode
Kampong Danau	73	TC2345
Kampong Keramut	321	TC2745
Kampong Panapar-Danau	376	TC2545
Kampong Tumpuan Ugas	302	TC2945
Total	1,072	

== Demography ==
The village alongside Telisai have reportedly been associated with the Dusun people.

== Transportation ==
Kampong Danau experiences the same wave of change, advancement, and growth as other communities in this nation. The locals could travel comfortably thanks to the building of a modern road (tar paved) in the middle of the 1950s. Those with the means to own their own car, or at the very least, possess a motorcycle and bicycle.

== Infrastructure ==
The village primary school is Danau Primary School. It also shares grounds with Danau Religious School, the village school for the country's Islamic religious primary education.

Kampong Danau Mosque is the village mosque; it was built in 1973 and can accommodate 200 worshippers.

Kampong Danau Community Hall is the village hall.

Until a contemporary bridge was completed across the Tutong River in 1959, travelers had to take a ferry. The old ferry can still be found.

== Notable people ==
- Abidin Abdul Rashid (1939–2010), politician and nobleman
- Abdul Ghafar Ismail (born 1952), diplomat

== Gallery ==
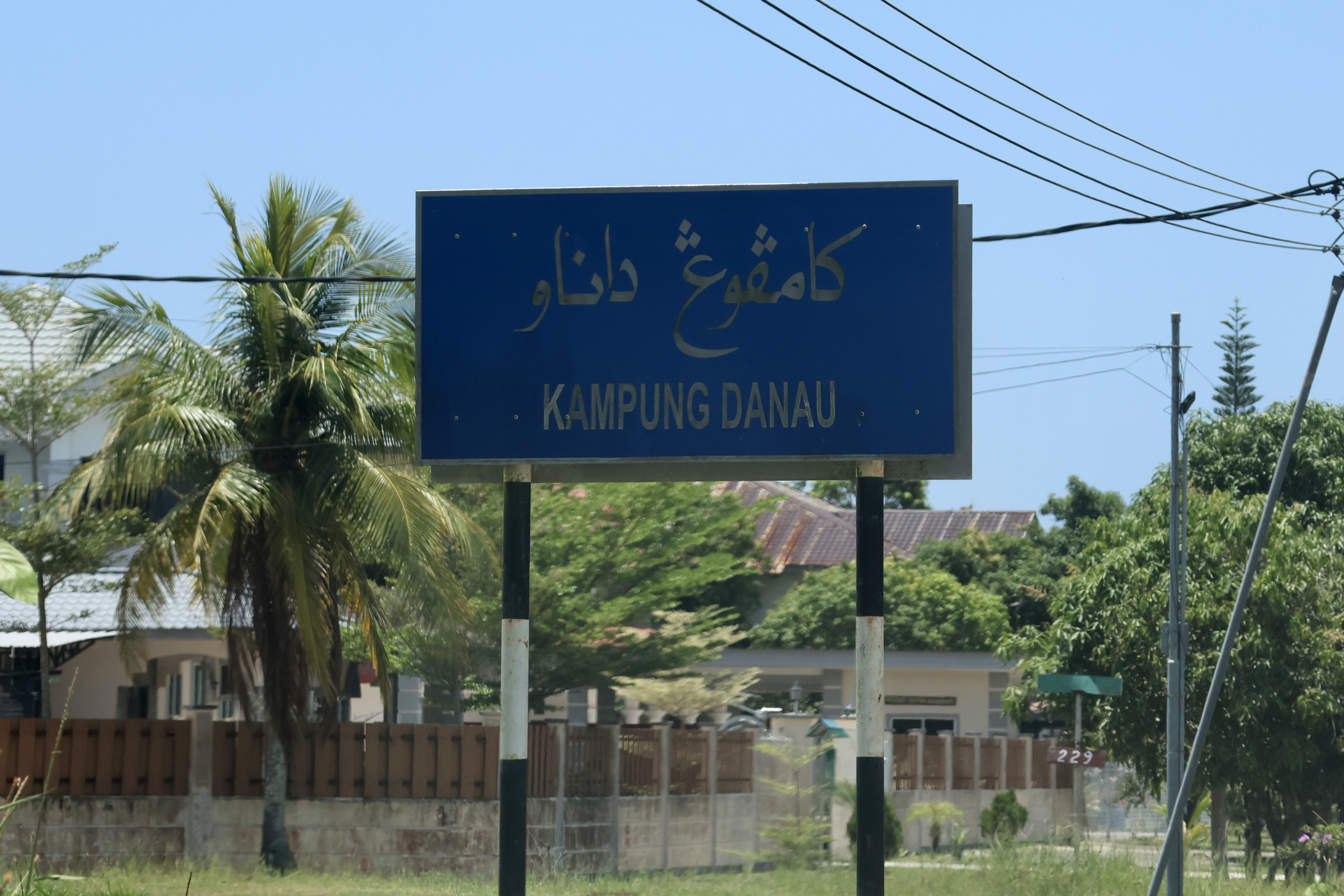
Kampong Danau road sign

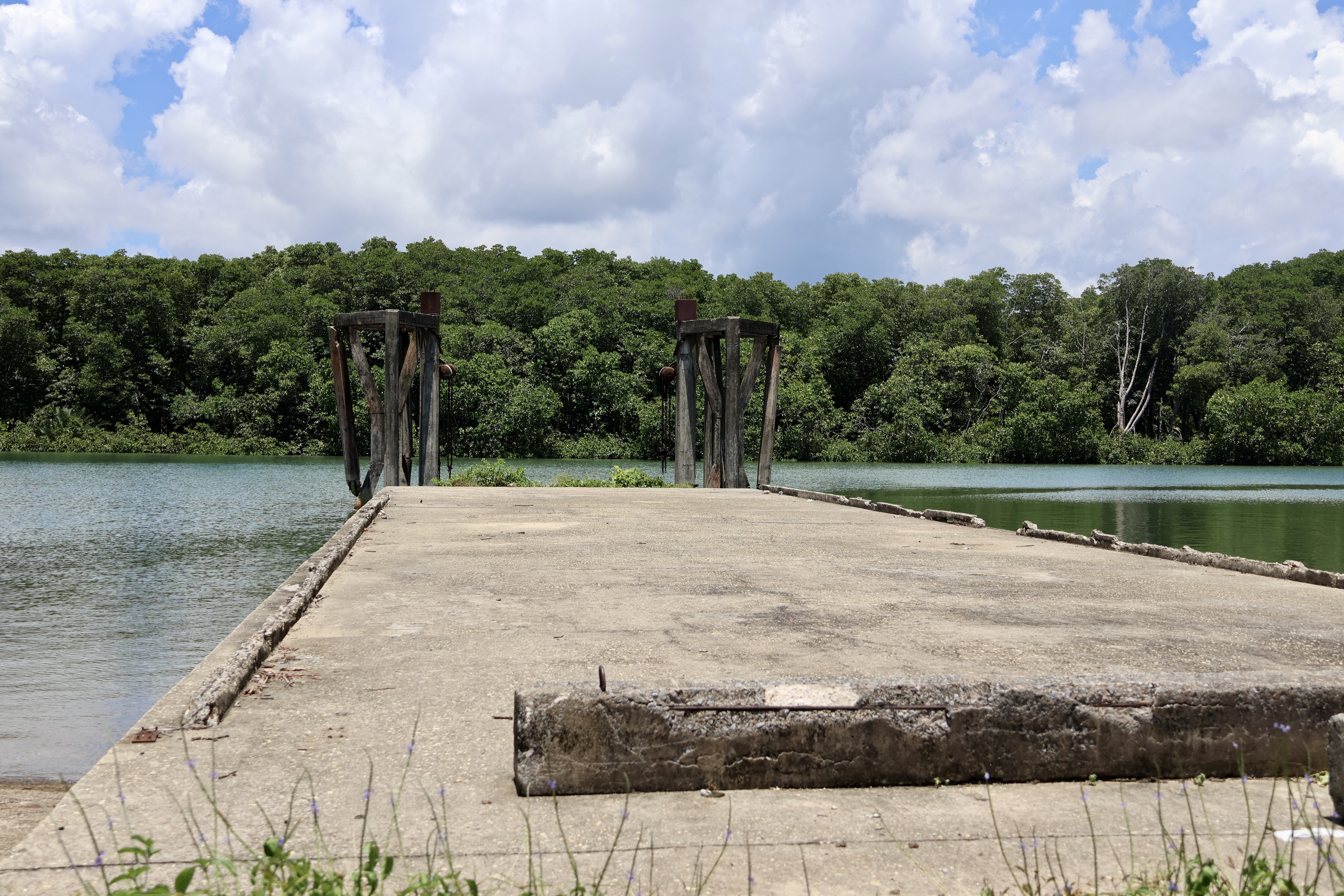
Kampong Danau Jetty

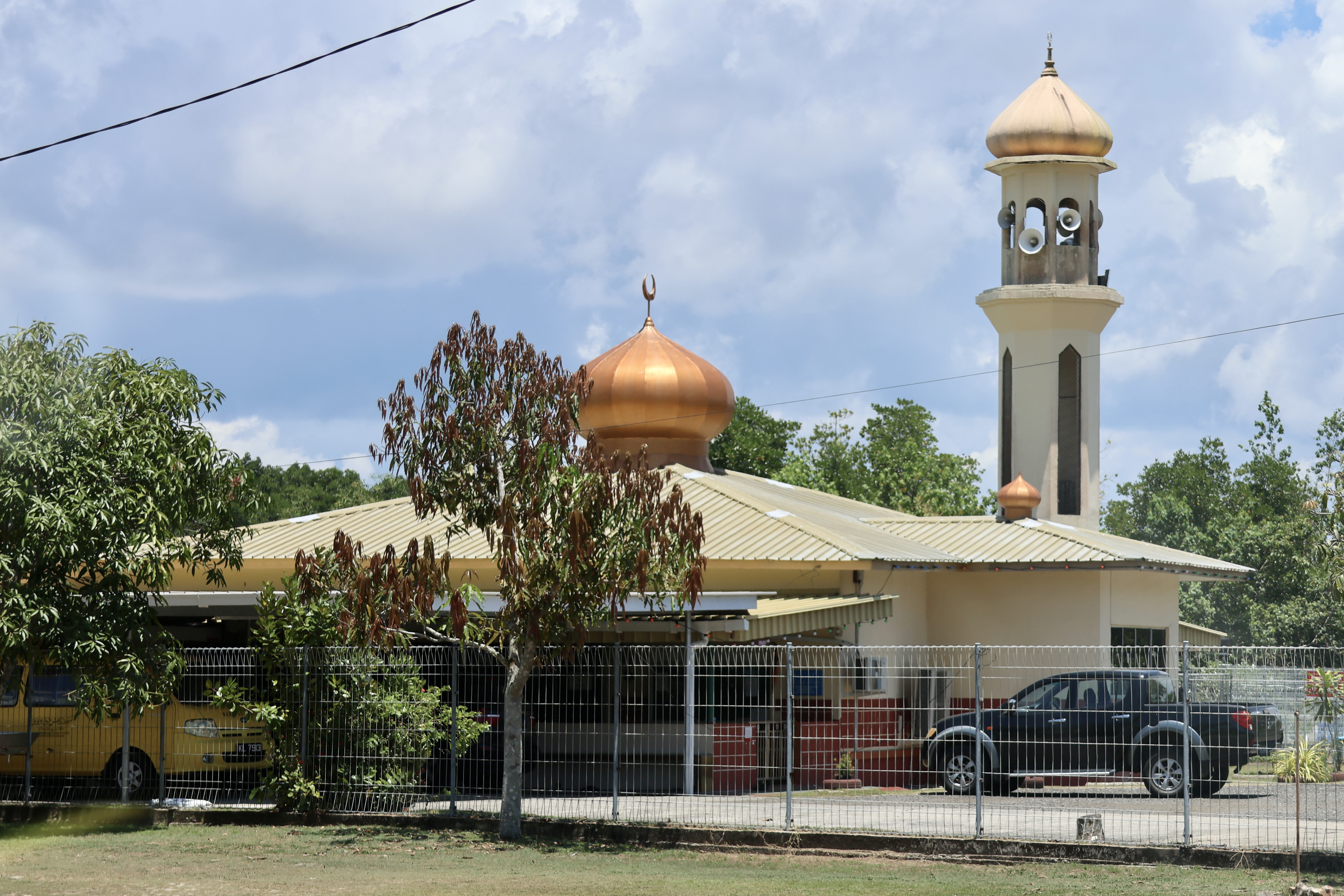
Kampong Danau Mosque

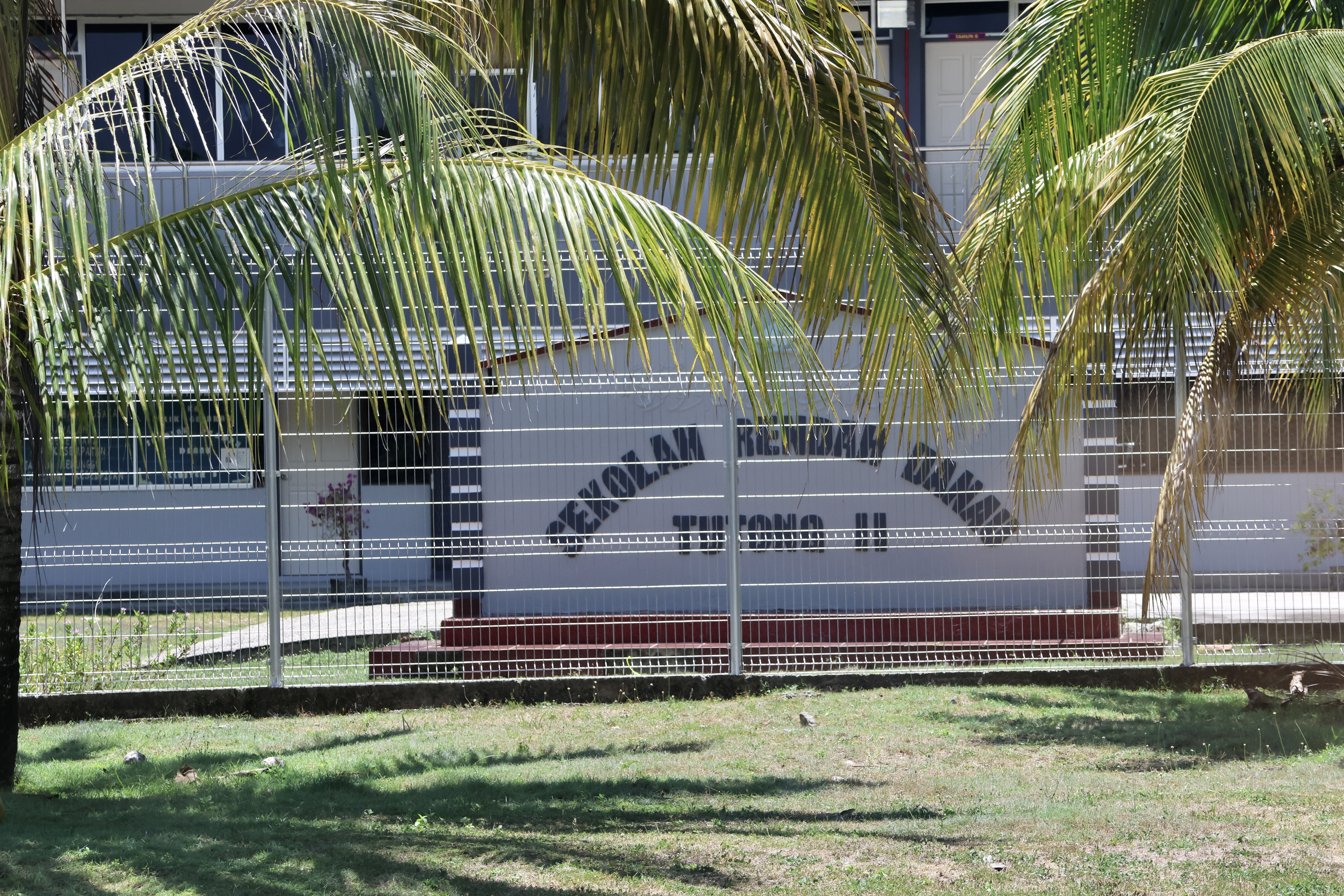
Danau Primary School
