= Kampong Telisai =

Village in Brunei

Telisai
- Village
- Kampong Telisai
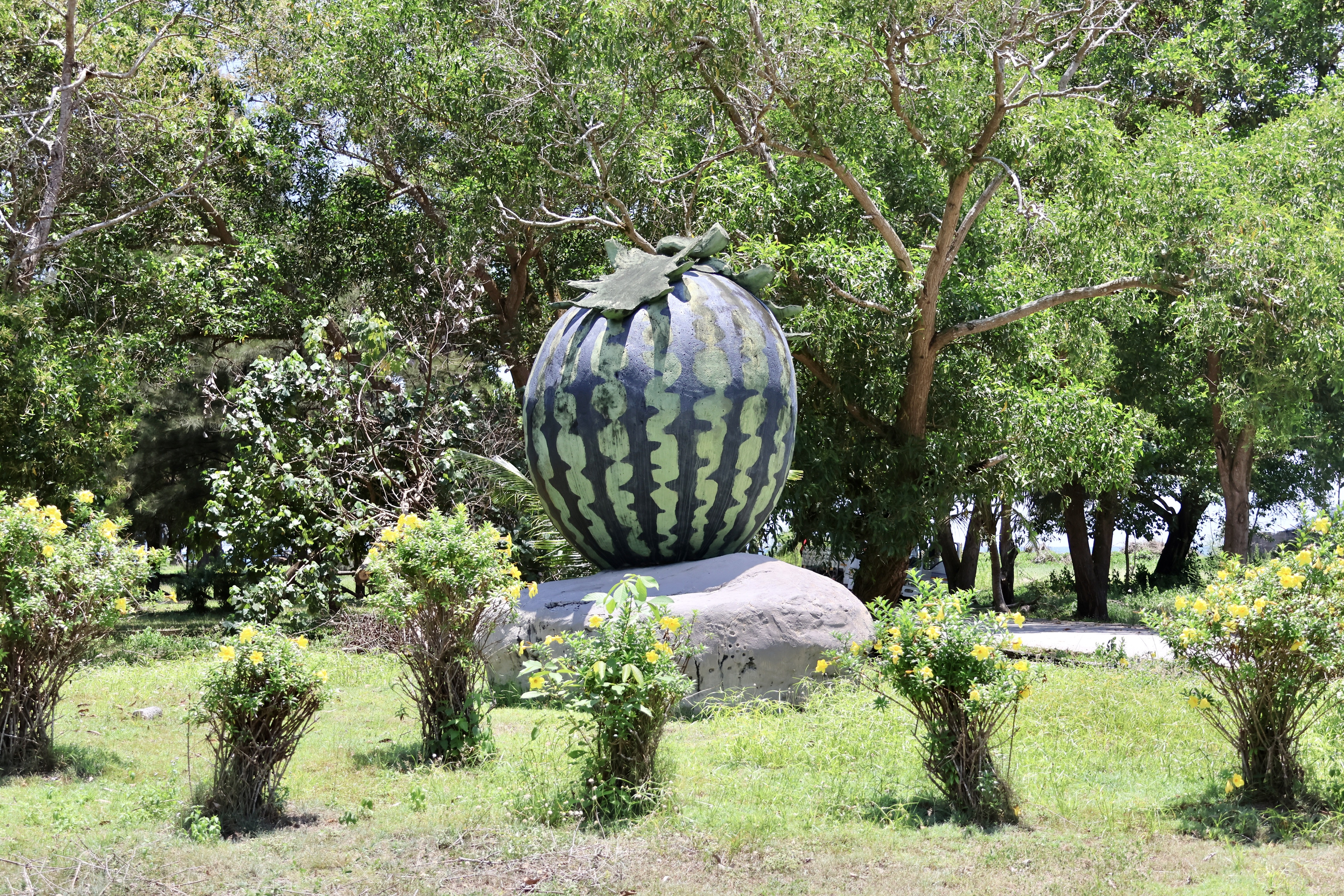
- Tumpuan Telisai Recreational Park

- Location in Brunei
- Coordinates: 4°43′57″N 114°33′28″E
- Country: Brunei
- District: Tutong
- Mukim: Telisai

Government
  - Village head: Sofian Yusof

Population (2016)
  - Total: 2,293
- Time zone: UTC+8 (BNT)
- Postcode: TC1145

Kampong Telisai (Malay: Kampung Telisai), also simply known as Telisai, is a coastal village in Tutong District, Brunei, about 17 kilometres (11 mi) from the district town Pekan Tutong. The village also encompasses the public housing area STKRJ Kampong Telisai. The population was 2,293 in 2016. It is one of the villages within Mukim Telisai. The postcode is TC1145.

== Etymology ==
In the past, local residents have worked on making traditional salt that is produced from the logs found on the beach which are then burned and sprinkled with seawater to obtain the dust that will be cooked until it freezes into salt. The salt is called 'Garam Takang' or 'Sira Takang' (Uson Takang in the Dusun dialect). This process takes quite a long time. Takang salt has a taste that is good enough to be eaten with local rice and some are even eaten alone. Residents around the village and also villagers from other areas would come to the beach to exchange daily items such as rice, sago, vegetables, fish and other necessities with Garam Takang in an open area. under a tree called 'Pokok Telisai' (the tree still exists to this day, the only one still surviving) to take shelter from the heat with its wide and lush leaves.

In the olden days, in the coastal area close to Pokok Telisai, this was a concentration of residents from Tutong or Seria, Belait and also some from the city to be used as a resting place or a temporary stop before continuing their journey to their respective destinations. Due to the journey taking quite a long time, up to 3 to 4 days, it even took up to a week to travel along the coast when the water was low and through the alleys in the forest. That's why they brought enough food supplies for a trip.

It is also used as a focal point for groups for local fishermen who come from Kuala Tutong and Kuala Sungai Penyatang who go to or return from fishing, in addition to trading the catch made by exchanging the necessary goods. Finally, the name Tumpuan Telisai was born which was previously only called 'Pengkalan Telisai' which was then immortalized as the name of a village that had not been named at that time as Kampung Tumpuan Telisai until now before it was changed to Kampung Telisai only.

== Demography ==
The village alongside Danau have reportedly been associated with the Dusun people. As of 2014, the population consists of various ethnic groups with the status of a plural society consisting of the Dusun, Tutong, Kedayan, Brunei and other tribes that came from other districts and then moved and resided after the construction of the Skim Perumahan Perpindahan Rakyat Jati (SPPRJ) Kampong Telisai. The majority of the population are Muslims who are inherited from generation to generation and a small part of them are those who have embraced Islam and there are only a few family groups left who have not yet embraced Islam, especially those who have moved from other villages to resident in this village.

== Administration ==
The Telisai area is divided into two areas, namely the Central Telisai area and the Telisai Pantai area. These two areas seem to be the main pulse of the entire Kampong Telisai area which has housed infrastructure such as a mosque, primary school, police post, post office and also a government clinic, especially in the Telisai Pantai area which is famous for the Tumpuan Telisai Recreational Park with a replica Watermelon (Sekoi) which is built on the junction road into the area. This leisure site is an area to hold various activities such as jogging or driving buggy cars by the residents, especially the youth group who live in the areas of Kampong Telisai with its natural form that is not disturbed.

== Economy ==
The economic resources of the local residents depended only on farming or planting rice, searching for materials from the forest, hunting, fishing and so on.

== Infrastructure ==
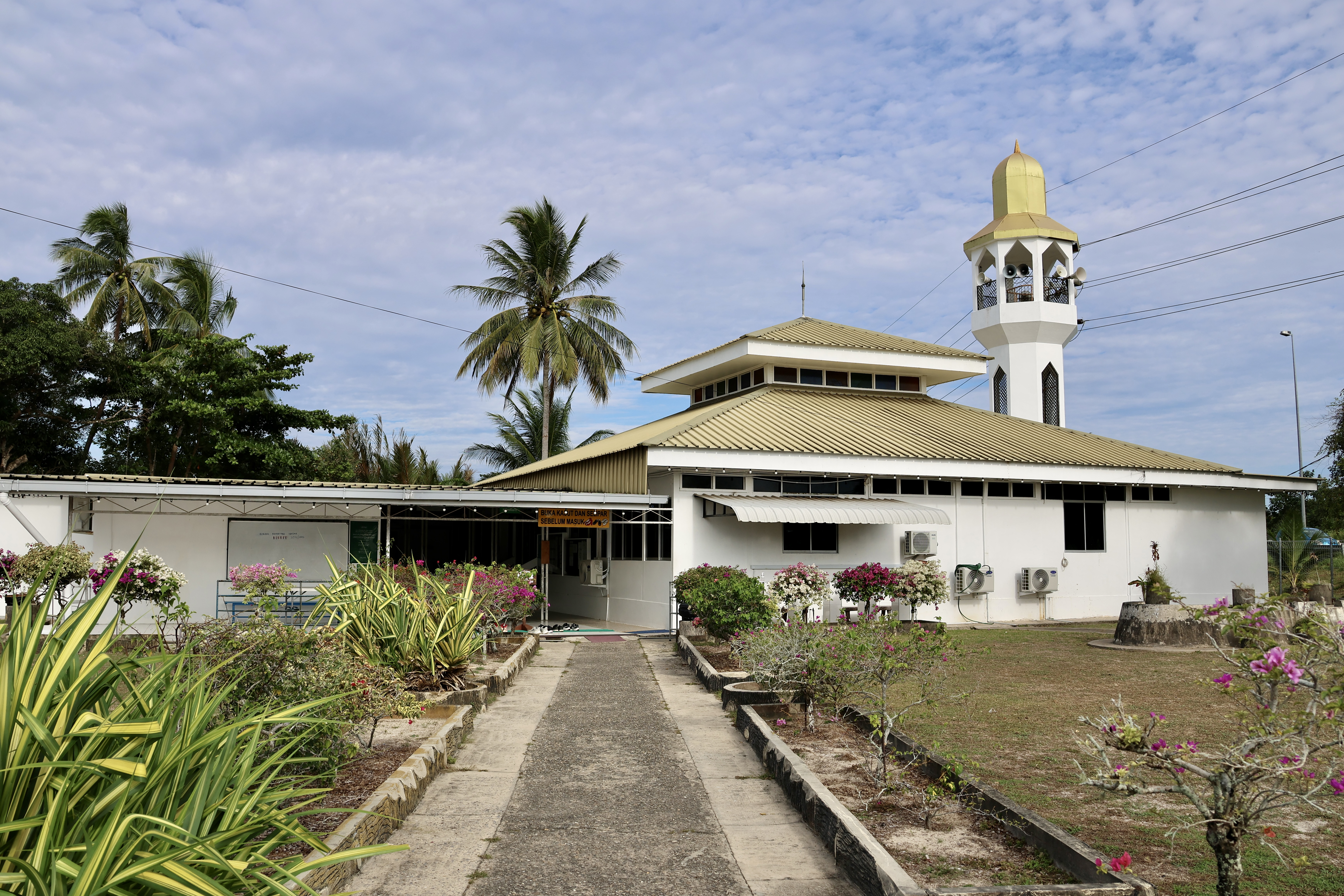
Kampong Telisai Mosque

The buildings house shops, restaurants, tire shops, drug stores, barber shops, hair salons including the Primet Cooperation Company building and a car wash. In this Telisai area there is also a car repair workshop apart from the stall block building and the leisure site area which has been worked together by the Majlis Perundingan Kampung (MPK) Telisai and also the participation of residents who live from all over the Telisai area.

=== Government ===
Telisai Post Office is the post office for the village and its surrounding neighborhood.

=== Education ===
Tumpuan Telisai Primary School is the village primary school, whereas Tumpuan Telisai Religious School is the village school for the primary level of the country's Islamic religious primary education.

=== Places of interest ===
- Kampong Telisai Mosque is the village mosque; it was inaugurated on 30 October 1984 and can accommodate 350 worshippers.
- Tumpuan Telisai Recreational Park is a public beach recreational area on the village's coast with the South China Sea.

== Notable people ==
- Ramli Lahit (born 1950), politician and educator
