= Vehicle registration plates of Brunei =

Brunei Darussalam
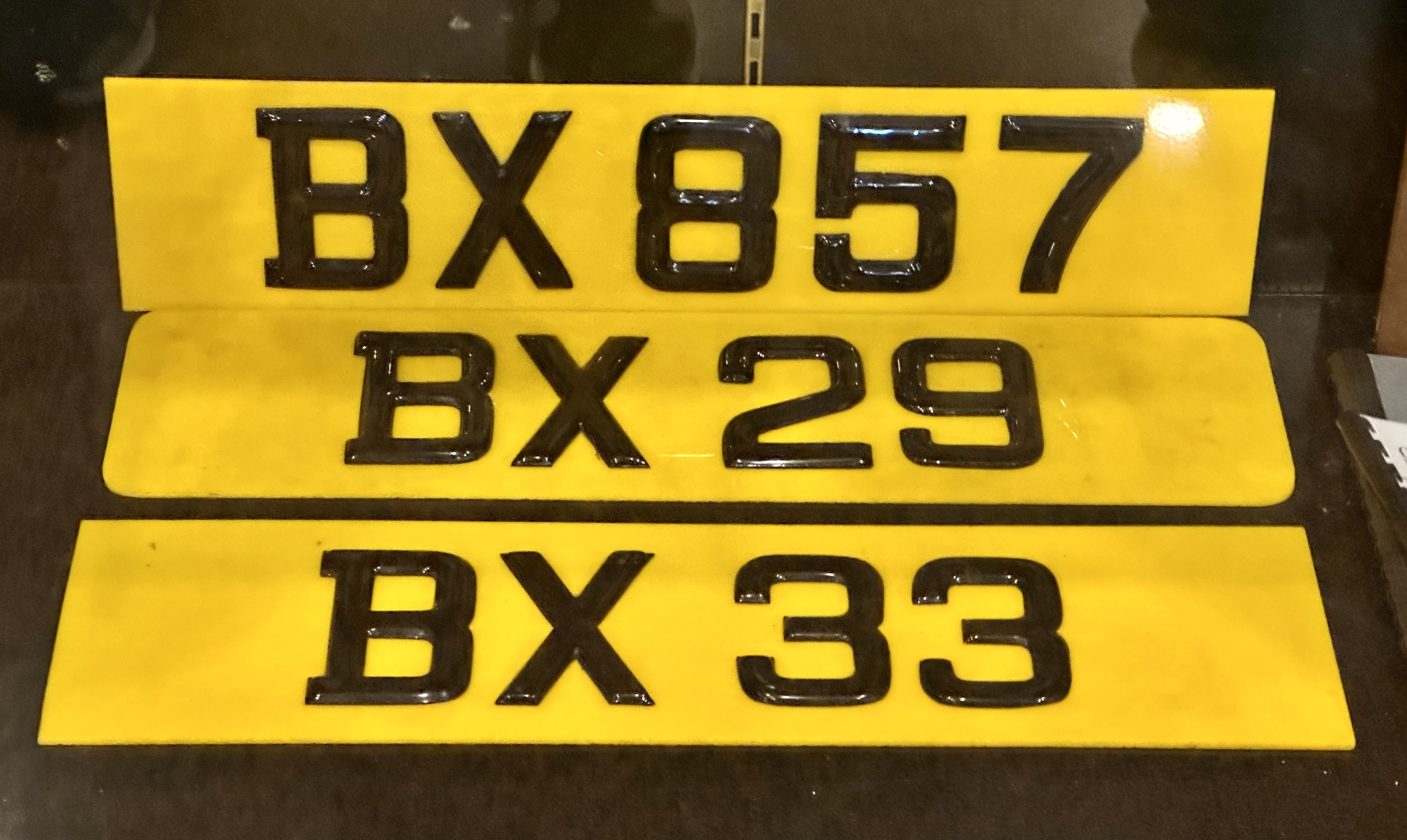
- Country: Brunei
- Country code: BRU

Current series
- Slogan: None
- Serial format: B 1' to 'BZZ 9999', or 'KA 1' to 'KP 9999

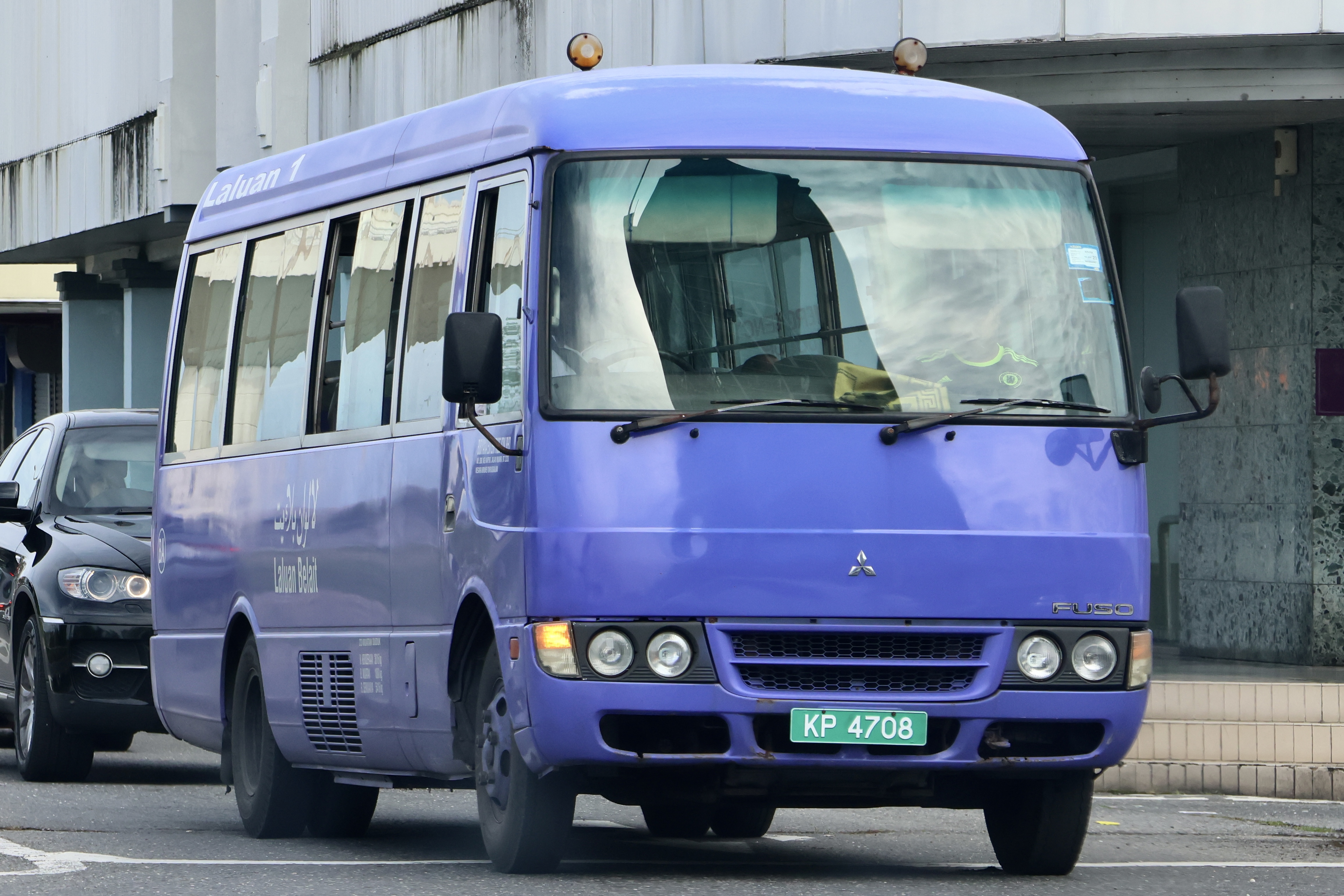
Mitsubishi Fuso Rosa bus with a green vehicle registration plate in Seria.

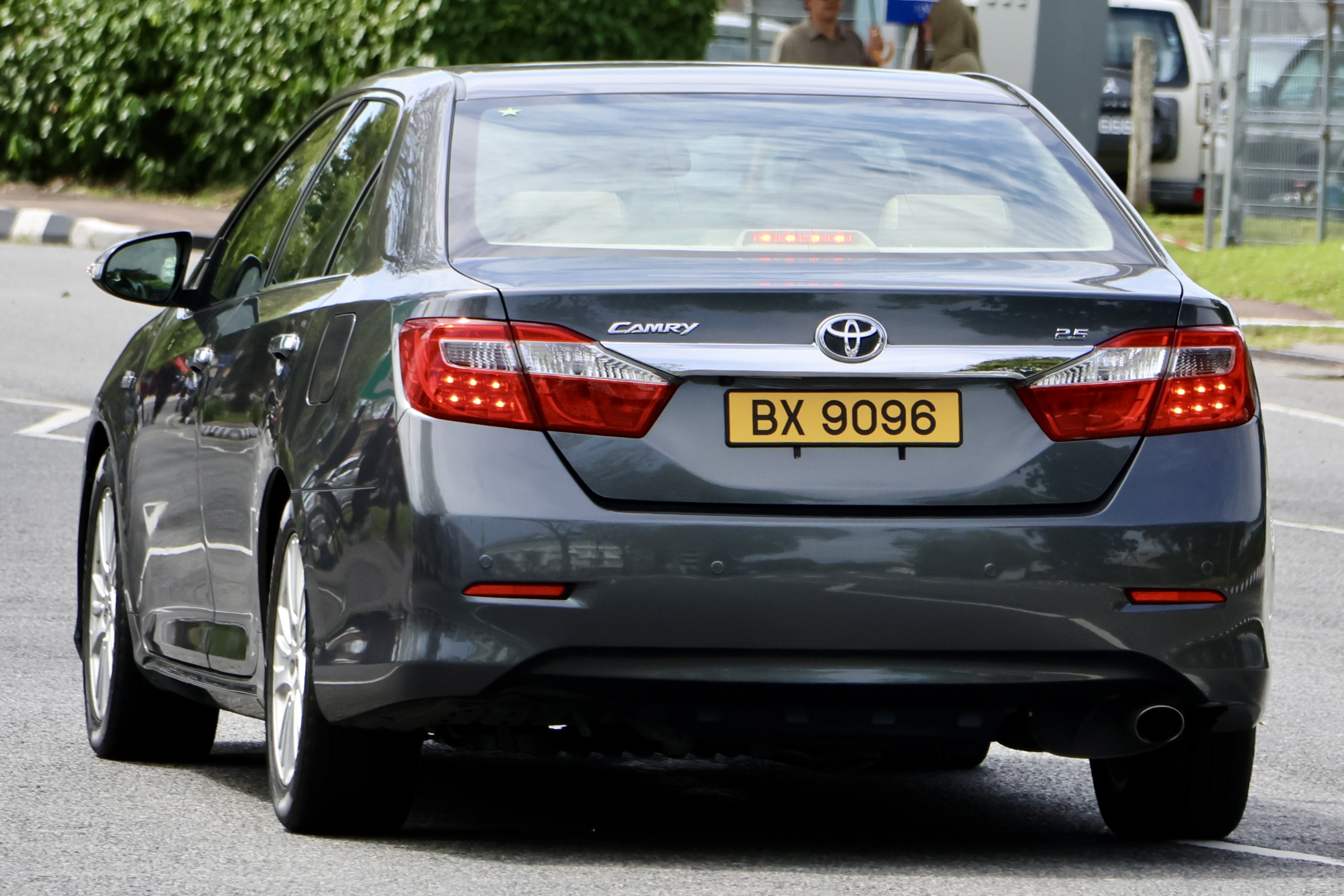
Toyota Camry with a yellow vehicle registration plate in 2024.

Vehicle registration plates are displayed on all motorised road vehicles in Brunei, as required by law. The issue of registration plates is regulated and administered by the Brunei Land Transport Department. All vehicles must also display two of the same registration plates numbers of the same colours at the front and rear of the vehicles. All vehicle registration plates in Brunei, other than those issued to royalty, diplomats and taxis (see below), have white characters on a black background, regardless of the vehicle type.

== Fundamental design ==
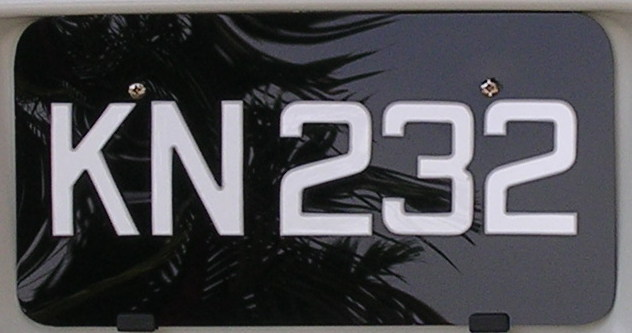
Typical three-numbered Brunei vehicle registration plate.

The most common form of Brunei vehicle registration plates, in use since the introduction of motorised vehicles in the country's British colonial era, typically begin with one or more letters, followed by up to four numerical digits with no leading zeroes. Letters used to be in white or grey on black background. Thus, the configuration of a common Brunei number plate may be in the form of 'BB 1234'.

Possible vehicle registration plate combinations range from 'B 1' to 'BZZ 9999', or 'KA 1' to 'KP 9999'. The first letter is either 'B' for motor vehicles registered with the Brunei-Muara Land Transport Department prior to 2006, or 'K' for vehicles registered with the Kuala Belait Land Transport Department prior to 2006. After 2006, the letter 'K' can be assigned to any vehicle irrespective of the location in which the car are registered. The table below shows special cases and exceptions. Some letters are not used for example: the letters I and O are not used to avoid ambiguity with numbers or other forms of local vehicle registration plates.

second letter	prefix letter B	comments	prefix letter K	comments
—	B	These were the first vehicle registration plates issued in the British protectorate of Brunei	-	There are no vehicle registration plates starting with the single letter K
D	-	There are no vehicle registration plates with BD	KD	For Belait only
E	BE	The first vehicle registration plates issued by the sovereign nation of Brunei	KE	For Belait only
G	BG	BG is reserved for government vehicles only	KG	For Belait only
H	BH		KH	KH was the last vehicle registration plates to be issued exclusively by the Kuala Belait Land Transport Department
J	BJ		KJ	KJ marks the start of vehicle registration plates issued by the Bandar Seri Begawan Land Transport Department (in addition to the Kuala Belait)
P	BP		KP	Last vehicle registration plate with a K prefix
X	BX	Only used for the Vehicles of the 1999 Southeast Asian Games; also used during the royal family wedding bearing yellow background and black font.		
Z	BZ	Also reserved for government vehicles.		

The first series of new, three-digit vehicle registration plates starting from 2009 until onwards are BAA, followed by BAB, BAC, BAE, BAF, BAG, BAH, BAJ, BAK, BAL, BAM, BAN, BAP, BAQ, BAR, BAS, BAT, BAU, BAV, and BAW. Most recent ones after the year 2020 onwards include BAX, BAY, and BAZ.

Shortly after, another new series of vehicle registration plates were released to the public in Brunei Darussalam. They start with the BB* prefix, and are three letters. Today, there are more than five new vehicle registration plate prefixes in the new series, such as BBA, BBB, BBC, BBD, BBE and BBF. Note that new series of vehicle registration plate prefixes starting from BAX until BBF has not have any one or two digit numbers released to the public yet as of January 2024.

The Land Transport Department started creating vehicle registration plates with three-digit alpha prefixes in 2009.

The format is used in virtually all classes of motor vehicles with engines, including, unless stated later:

- Private vehicles (cars, motorcycles, vans, trucks, and other vehicles of similar design).
- Commercial and industrial vehicles (vans, trucks - light or heavy, buses, road-legal vehicles for construction and excavation, and other vehicles of similar design).
- Service vehicles (police cars, ambulances, fire engines, public utility vehicles, and other vehicles of similar design).

The shape and size of Brunei vehicle registration plates on vehicles, with the exception of motorcycles and scooters, are restricted to either 8.5 by 13.5 inches (216 by 343 millimetres) or 21 by 6 inches (533 by 152 millimetres). Vehicular plates on motorcycles are usually smaller, at either 4.25 by 6.75 inches (108 by 171 millimetres) or 8.5 by 3 inches (216 by 76 millimetres). The size of the letters and numbers on the vehicle registration plate is defined to be 3.5 by 2.5 by 0.625 inches (89 by 64 by 16 millimetres) for all vehicles except for motorcycles which is defined to be 1.75 by 2.5 by 0.3125 inches (44 by 64 by 8 millimetres).

== Special cases ==
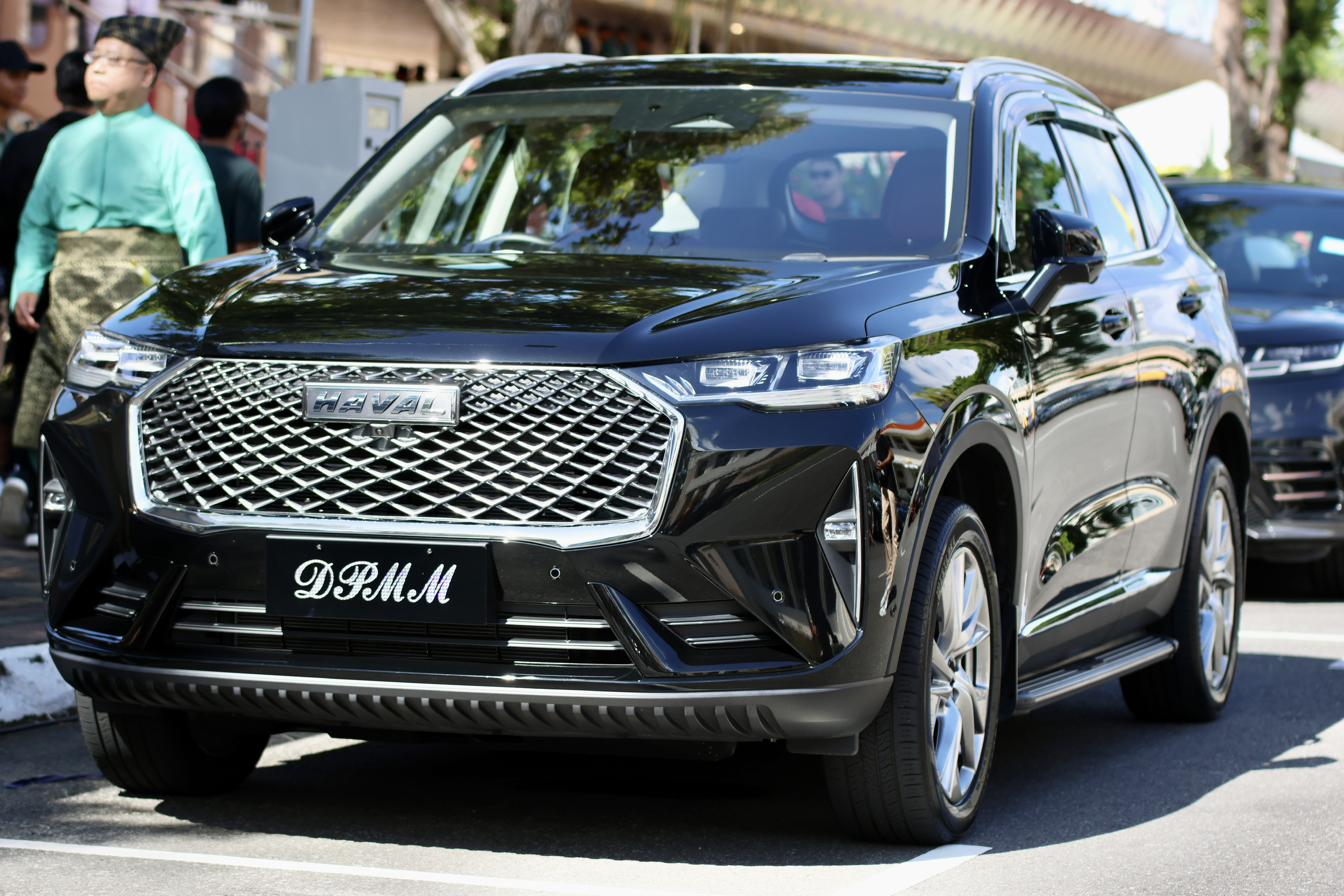
Crown Prince of Brunei's vehicle registration plate on a Haval H6.

=== Royal Family ===
Some of the vehicles of the members of the Brunei Royal Family including the Sultan and the Crown Prince have unique vehicle registration plates. Some of the plates have different colours (e.g. white on red), initials or fancy script.

=== Diplomat car ===
Number 4 DC Indonesia XX-NN-DC, where XX is a sequential number, NN = foreign mission number (e.g. USA = 9), and DC stands for diplomat's car. The vehicle registration plates have a white background with black letters and numbers.

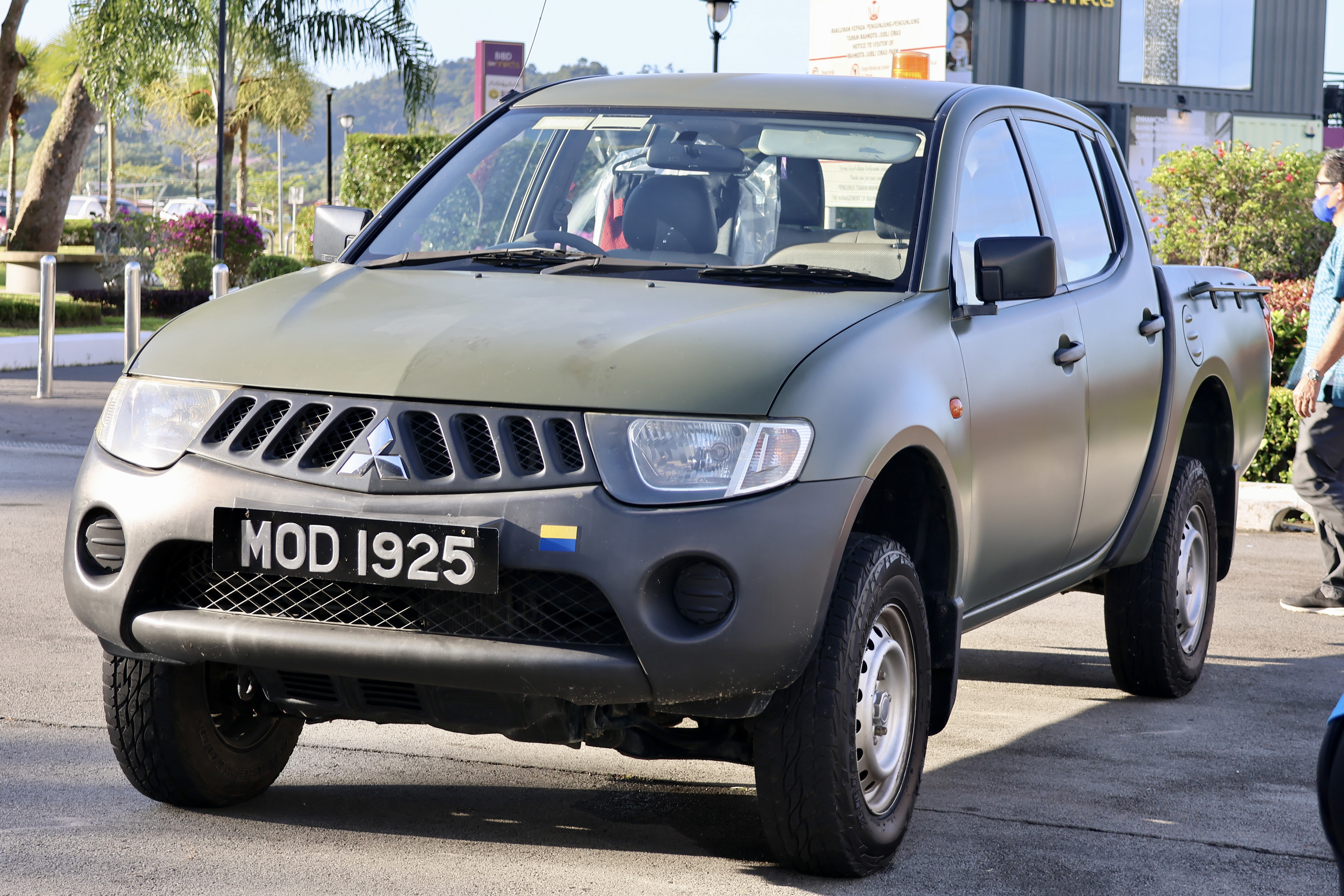
Royal Brunei Land Force Mitsubishi Triton with MOD initials.

=== Military vehicles ===
Military vehicles have a white letters / numbers on black background identical to any private registered car. However, the numbering system is different from private vehicles as all military vehicles are registered with a MOD 1111x number, where MOD stands for Ministry of Defence, 1111 is the number with any leading zeros being omitted and x is a letter denoting which branch of the military it is registered under.

=== Taxis and buses ===
The numbers for taxis and buses are the same as those for private vehicles, but the vehicle registration plates have a green background instead of black background instead. The letters and numbers on the plate is white in colour as with private vehicles.

=== Dealerships ===
Temporary vehicle registration plates are given to car dealerships to enable the car to be transported to the showroom, for test drives, etc. These plates have a white background with red letters and numbers.

=== Foreign Malaysian vehicles ===
Older Brunei number plates bears similarity to Malaysian state of Selangor and Kedah number plates which also begin with 'B' and 'K'. The newer Brunei number plates has font shape and size that can easily differentiate them from Malaysian registered vehicles.
