= Brooketon Colliery =

Coal mine in Brunei

Coordinates: 5.0351°N 115.0557°E

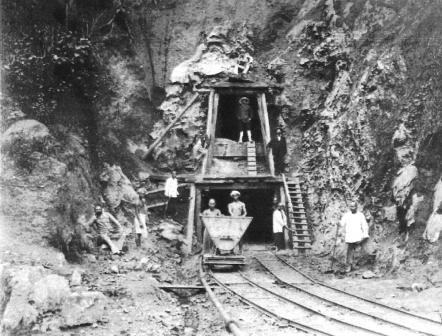
Muara Coal Mine by end of 19th century

Brooketon Colliery, formerly known as Muara Coal Mine, was one of the underground coal mines in Brunei.

== Location ==
The Brooketon Colliery is located in Serasa. It is located to the north of the roundabout where Jalan Muara meets the Muara–Tutong Highway about one and a half miles away from Muara Town centre.

== History ==
Coal was first reported in Brunei Darussalam near Muara as early as 1837. in Serai Pimping. The Muara coalmine was first mined commercially in 1883, when William Cowie was given the concession rights to mine the coal in exchange for $1,200 per year. However, Cowie later sold his rights to Rajah Charles Brooke and the Rajah renamed the mine Brooketon (Brooke Town). Between 1889 and 1924, it was operated by the Sarawak government of Rajah Charles Brooke. Annual exports of coal varied between 10,000 and 25,000 tons annually and in those 33 years of operation, more than 650,000 tons were exported. At first it was opencast until it became harder and underground mining was introduced.

Brooketon Colliery was strategic as it was very near to Muara where then and now there is a safe deep-water anchorage to which the mine was connected via rail. During the time the mine was in operation, there was a wooden rail line that connected Brooketon which is about one and a half mile away from Muara. The rail line is no longer in place.

Politically too, even though he only had economic rights, Brooke became the de facto ruler of the area. The mine employed hundreds of miners and that required him to introduce a police force, post office and roads transforming Muara into an extraterritorial settlement an extension of Sarawak. It was not until 1921 that Muara was "returned" to Brunei.

It closed down in 1924 because of heavy financial losses caused by continuously decreasing coal prices in the world economic recession.

== Current Issues ==
All that remains of the mine today is an overgrown railway, locomotives, mine entrances and an abandoned Morris Minor.

The Museums Department of Brunei wanted to turn the historical 62 hectares coal mine as an open site museum to promote the country's eco-tourism. It is currently already a protected site under the Antiquities and Treasure Trove Act of Brunei Darussalam.
