= Yusof Husain =

Bruneian civil servant (1906–1975)

Yang Dimuliakan Lagi Dihormati Pehin Orang Kaya Digadong Seri Diraja Dato Laila Utama Yusof Husain DK PSNB DPMB POAS PJK
- يوسف حسين
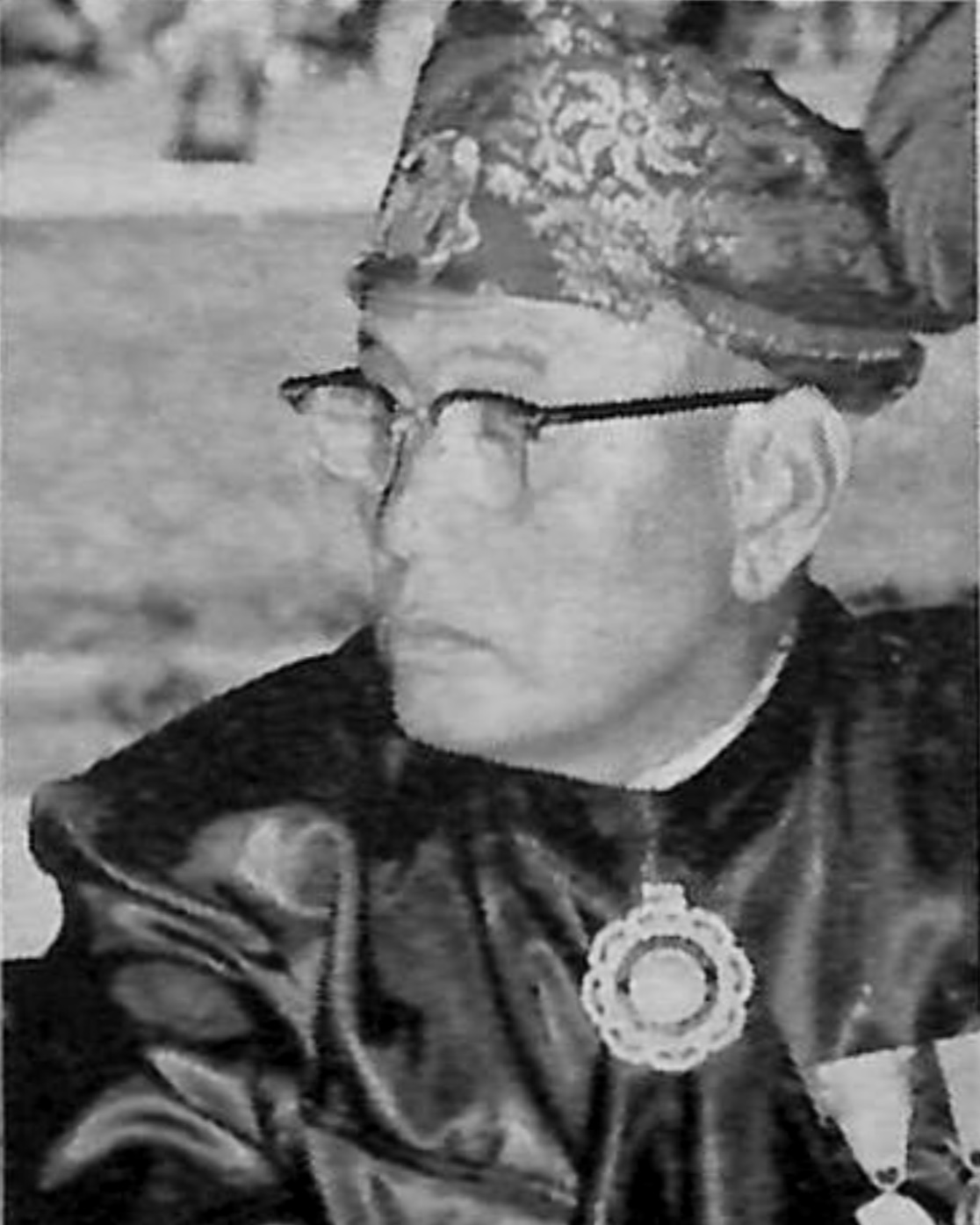
- Yusof, c. 1962
- Born: 1906; Kampong Sungai Kedayan, Kampong Ayer, Brunei
- Died: 5 January 1975 (aged 68–69)
- Occupation: Civil servant
- Known for: Member of Tujuh Serangkai committee from 1953 to 1954
- Children: Hussain; Ahmad

Muhammad Yusof bin Muhammad Husain (Note: His name is commonly spelled as Muhammad Yusof bin Muhammad Husain; however, the Brunei History Centre records it as Muhammad Yusuf bin Mohd. Husain.) (1906–1975) was an aristocrat and civil servant from Brunei. Between 1953 and 1954, he served as a member of the Tujuh Serangkai ("Seven Branches") committee, tasked with gathering feedback from both urban and rural communities on the proposed Bruneian constitution. During the drafting process, the committee provided Sultan Omar Ali Saifuddien III with invaluable advice and produced a comprehensive report.

== Biography ==
Born in 1906 in Kampung Sungai Kedayan, Muhammad Yusof was the son of Pehin Jawatan Dalam Haji Muhammad Husain. He received his early education at Brunei Town Malay School and later continued his studies in Singapore. Over time, he held several significant positions in Brunei's administrative and political landscape, including serving as Ketua Manteri (Head of Manteri) and as a member of various councils and committees. In 1955, he became a member of the District Council, and later, in 1959, he was appointed to the Legislative Council, the Privy Council in 1960, the Succession Council in 1970, and the Public Service Commission from 1962 to 1970.

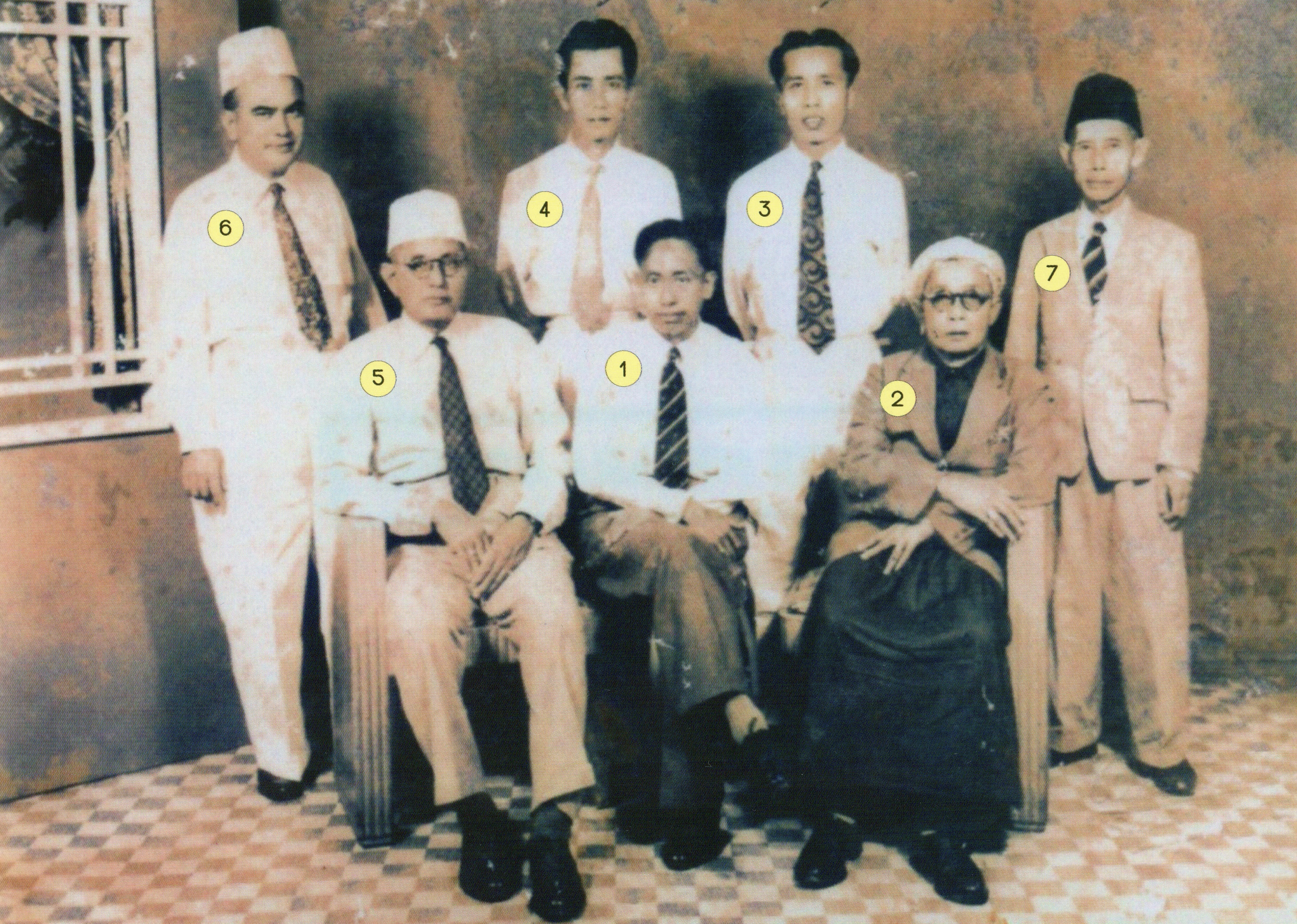
Yusof (no. 5) in a group photograph with the other six members of the Tujuh Serangkai

In 1951, Yusof, along with Noor Abdul Razak, joined Sultan Omar Ali Saifuddien III's pilgrimage to Mecca at their own expense. In July 1953, the sultan formed the Tujuh Serangkai committee, of which he was a member, to design the Bruneian constitution. The committee, which included members from various districts in Brunei, was tasked with collecting public opinions on the proposed constitution. Yusof, representing Belait, worked alongside key figures such as the Chief Kadhi, Pengiran Muhammad Salleh, and committee chairman Pengiran Muda Abdul Kahar. The Tujuh Serangkai undertook a research trip to British Malaya and Singapore in 1954 to study constitutional systems in states such as Johor, Selangor, and Negeri Sembilan. Pengiran Muhammad Yusuf, as the committee's secretary, compiled a 50-page report summarising the findings and recommendations, which was presented to the sultan as part of the constitutional development process.

On 25 May 1959, Yusof represented Brunei's Manteris at a tea gathering at the Civic Centre in Brunei Town to show devotion and appreciation to the sultan for the success of his delegation's recent trip to London. During his speech, Yusof commended the sultan's efforts in reassuring the public and restoring confidence in the country's governance. He highlighted the sultan's commitment to bringing the nation together and strengthening it through cooperation and understanding.

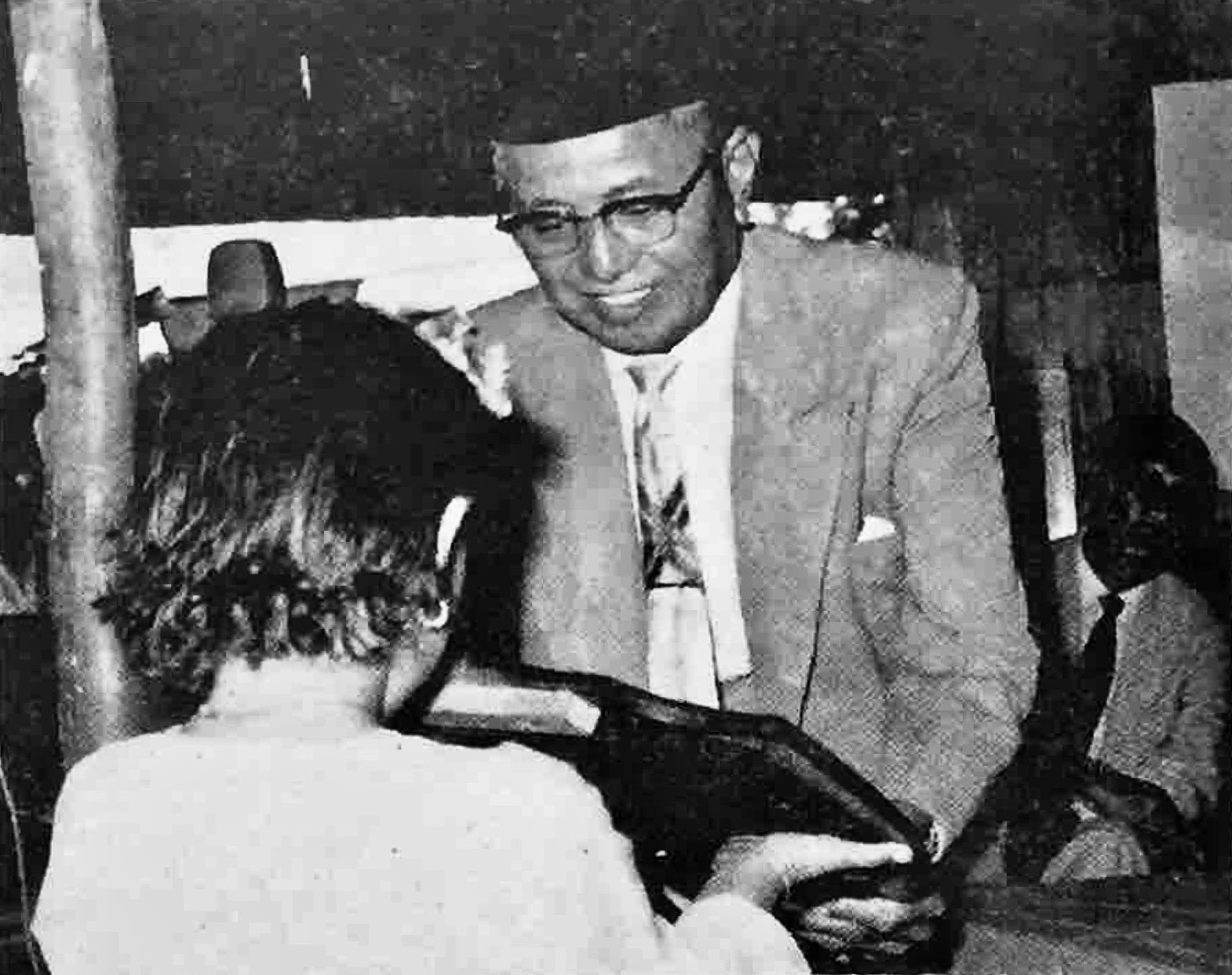
Yusof presenting the Perisai Kedatangan on 2 July 1964

In 1961, Yusof also joined a delegation to the Federation of Malaya, where Pengiran Muda Hashim, as the sultan's personal envoy, presented Brunei's highest honours to Yahya Petra of Kelantan and the Munawir of Negeri Sembilan. Yusof, along with Taha Bakir and Ali Hussein, accompanied the envoy. The delegation returned to Brunei on 6 November 1961. On 2 July 1964, he acted on behalf of the sultan, awarded the Perisai Kedatangan (Arrival Shield) to Pengiran Muda Mahkota Malay School in Kuala Tutong for its outstanding attendance in 1963. At the ceremony, he highlighted the importance of education and community engagement in achieving such success.

Yusof presented the Pintu Gerbang Sempena Peruspaan gateway honouring the coronation ceremony of Sultan Hassanal Bolkiah on 1 August 1968. The gateway was once built in Kampong Sultan Lama, but after the Yayasan Sultan Haji Hassanal Bolkiah Complex was built in October 1993, it was moved a little inward.

Yusof died on 5 January 1975.

== Personal life ==
Yusof had several children who distinguished themselves in various fields. Pehin Orang Kaya Digadong Seri Lela Dato Seri Paduka Haji Hussain served as the Minister of Culture, Youth and Sports from 1986 to 2005, while Dato Paduka Haji Ahmad held the position of Tutong District Officer from 1983 to 1984.

== Titles, styles and honours ==
=== Titles and styles ===
Yusof was honoured with several noble titles throughout his life. On 23 March 1939, he was bestowed the title Pehin Jawatan Dalam Seri Maharaja, styled as Yang Dimuliakan. In 1941, he was promoted to Pehin Orang Kaya Digadong Seri Lela. Eventually, on 31 August 1974, he attained the highest rank within the Manteri's social class, becoming the head of the class with the title Pehin Orang Kaya Digadong Seri Diraja. These two titles are styled as Yang Dimuliakan Lagi Dihormati.

- 23 March 1939 – 1941: Pehin Jawatan Dalam Seri Maharaja
- 1941 – 31 August 1974: Pehin Orang Kaya Digadong Seri Lela
- 31 August 1974 – 5 January 1975: Pehin Orang Kaya Digadong Seri Diraja

=== Honours ===
Yusof has been awarded the following national honours;

- Family Order of Laila Utama (DK; 15 July 1970) – Dato Laila Utama
- Family Order of Seri Utama (DK; 7 September 1964) – Dato Seri Utama
- Order of Setia Negara Brunei First Class (PSNB; 23 September 1967) – Dato Seri Setia
- Order of Seri Paduka Mahkota Brunei Second Class (DPMB; 23 September 1962) – Dato Paduka
- Order of Seri Paduka Mahkota Brunei Third Class (SMB; 23 September 1958)
- Omar Ali Saifuddin Medal (POAS; 1956)
- Meritorious Service Medal (PJK; 1959)
- Coronation Medal (1968)
