= Ahmad Daud =

Bruneian civil servant (1907–1976)

Yang Dimuliakan Pehin Orang Kaya Shahbandar Dato Setia Ahmad Daud احمد داود DSNB POAS PJK MBE
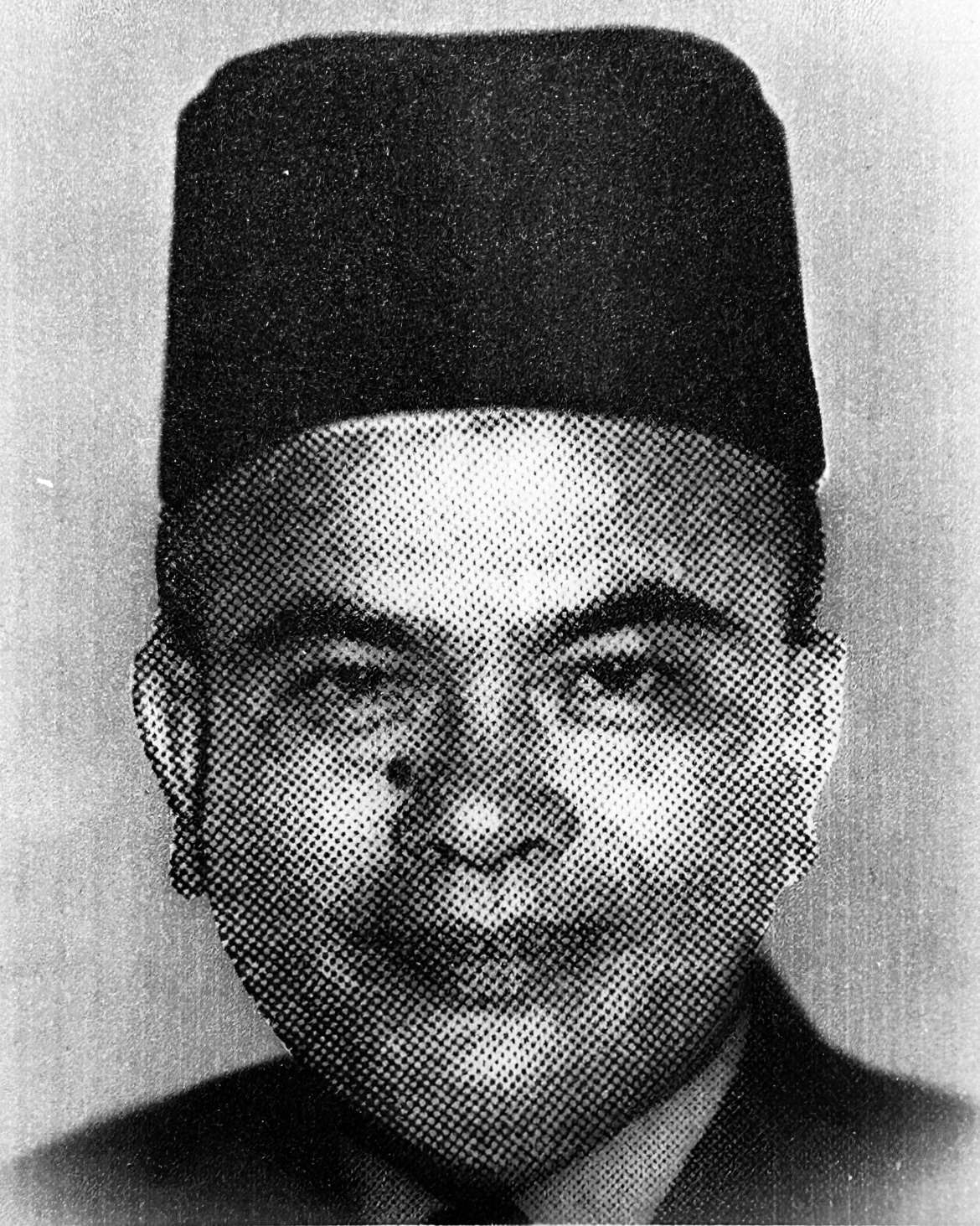
- Pehin Ahmad during the 1959 Bruneian Constitution signing
- Born: 1907; Crown Colony of Labuan
- Died: 18 July 1976 (aged 68–69); Brunei
- Occupations: Civil servant; politician
- Known for: Member of Tujuh Serangkai committee from 1953 to 1954 and Privy Councillor
- Children: Zaini

Ahmad bin Haji Mohd Daud (1907 – 18 July 1976) was a Bruneian aristocrat and civil servant who was the chairman of the Tujuh Serangkai ("seven branches") committee from 1953 to 1954, assigned the duty of gathering opinions on the proposed Constitution of Brunei from both rural and urban residents, producing an extensive report, and offering guidance to Sultan Omar Ali Saifuddien III during the writing process. Additionally, he was a member of the Privy Council in c. 1974.

== Early life ==
Ahmad was born in the Crown Colony of Labuan in 1907. His Indian Muslim grandfather immigrated to North Borneo-Labuan as a trader. He received his education at an English school in Labuan.

== Career ==
Ahmad began his civil career with the Brunei government, starting as a clerk in the Customs Department on 1 January 1925 and later serving as a clerk to British Resident Eric Ernest Falk Pretty in 1928. He served as the Controller of Food Rationing under the Japanese occupation of Brunei in World War II, which lasted from 1941 until 1945. He held various administrative positions, including District Officer of Temburong from 1946 to 1947, Belait from 1948 to 1956, and Brunei–Muara from 1956 to 1960.

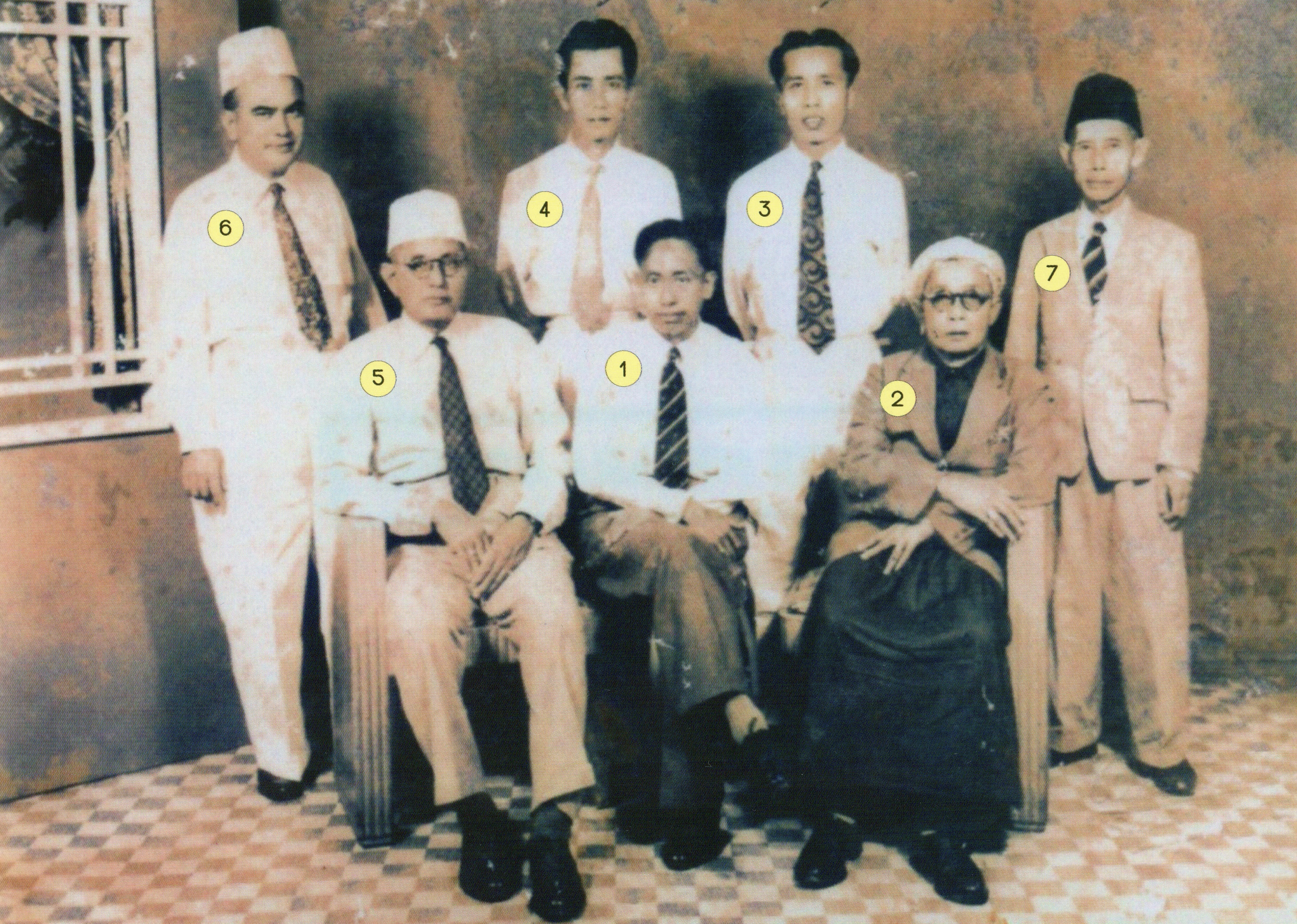
Ahmad (no. 6) in a group photograph with the other six members of the Tujuh Serangkai

Pehin Ahmad joined the Tujuh Serangkai, an assembly set up by the Sultan in July 1953 to gather opinions from the general public across the country in preparation for the formulation of Brunei's formal constitution. Wazirs, Cheteria, Manteri, and State Council members were among the seven appointments tasked with offering counsel on the drafting of the Constitution, the creation of district councils, and the restructuring of the State Council. The committee's fifty-page report, which was turned in on 23 March 1954, summarised feedback from the general public and constitutional analysis. The report was met with unexpected positive reception from the authorities. After the Merdeka Talks, the Sultan led a delegation to London in March 1959, including Pehin Ahmad, to finalise Brunei's constitutional framework, discussing crucial issues like council meetings, elections, and the roles of British officials and advisers.

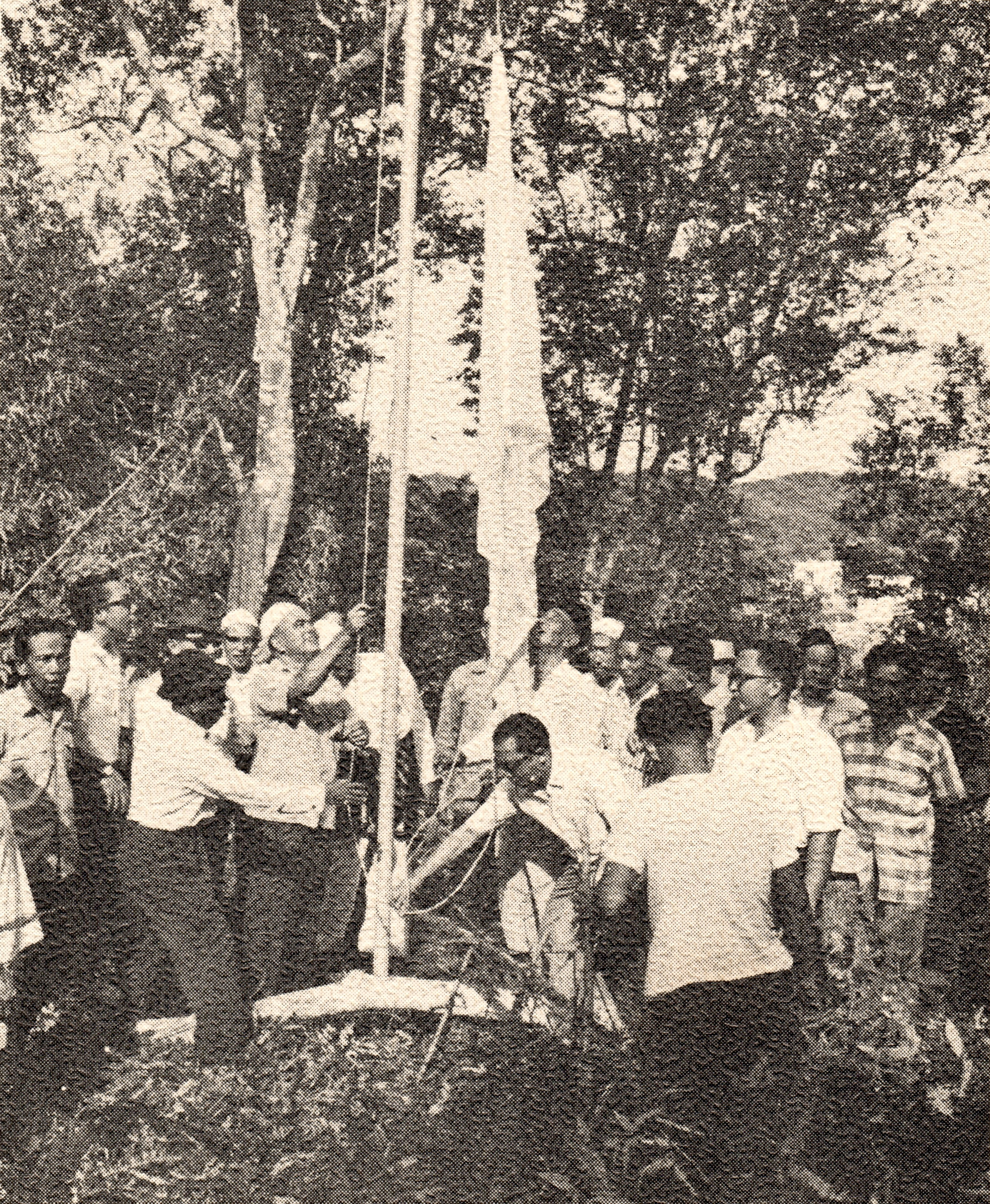
Ahmad raising the yellow flag on Bukit Panggal, Tutong in 1968

He served as one of the District Advisory Council and "Observer" of the State Council until April 1957 and later as an Unofficial member of the State Council from March 1957 to September 1959. Additionally, Ahmad was an unofficial member of the Water Supply and Land Committee from 1957 to 1958, Legislative and Executive Councils from 1959 until August 1962 and was appointed Resettlement Officer from 1961 to 1965. In 1965, he was one of the seven directors of the National Bank of Brunei.

Two groups of people departed for Bukit Panggal and Bukit Sungai Kebun on 1 February 1968. Ahmad raised the yellow flag on Bukit Panggal, while Pehin Muhammad formally raised the red flag on Bukit Sungai Kebun. The traditional Bruneian way of crowning Sultan Hassanal Bolkiah involves raising two flags on top of these two hills.

== Death ==
Ahmad was quite close to Sultan Omar Ali Saifuddien III, and remained loyal to the state until his death on 18 July 1976.

== Personal life ==
Ahmad's spouse descended from the Pehin (Manteri) family, who were members of Brunei's ruling elite. Together they have an only son Zaini (born 1935). When speaking with Zaini, the Sultan was quite direct in saying that Ahmad had no influence over whatever he did during the 1962 Brunei revolt. Naturally, Ahmad was devastated to discover his lone son took part in the rebellion.

== Titles, styles and honours ==
He was bestowed the title of Yang Dimuliakan Pehin Orang Kaya Shahbandar on 17 November 1951. His appointment into the State Council granted him the honorary title of Yang Berhormat. He has been bestowed the following honours:

- Order of Setia Negara Brunei Second Class (DSNB; 24 November 1960) – Dato Setia
- Omar Ali Saifuddin Medal Second Class (POAS; 23 September 1958)
- Meritorius Service Medal (PJK; 23 September 1959)
- Omar Ali Saifuddin Coronation Medal (31 May 1951)
- Honorary Member of the Order of the British Empire (MBE; 1954)
