= Pengiran Muhammad Salleh =

Bruneian religious figure and clergy (1890–1969)

Yang Teramat Mulia Seri Paduka Pengiran Di-Gadong Sahibul Mal Pengiran Muhammad Salleh DK SPMB POAS PJK
- ڤڠيرن محمد صالح
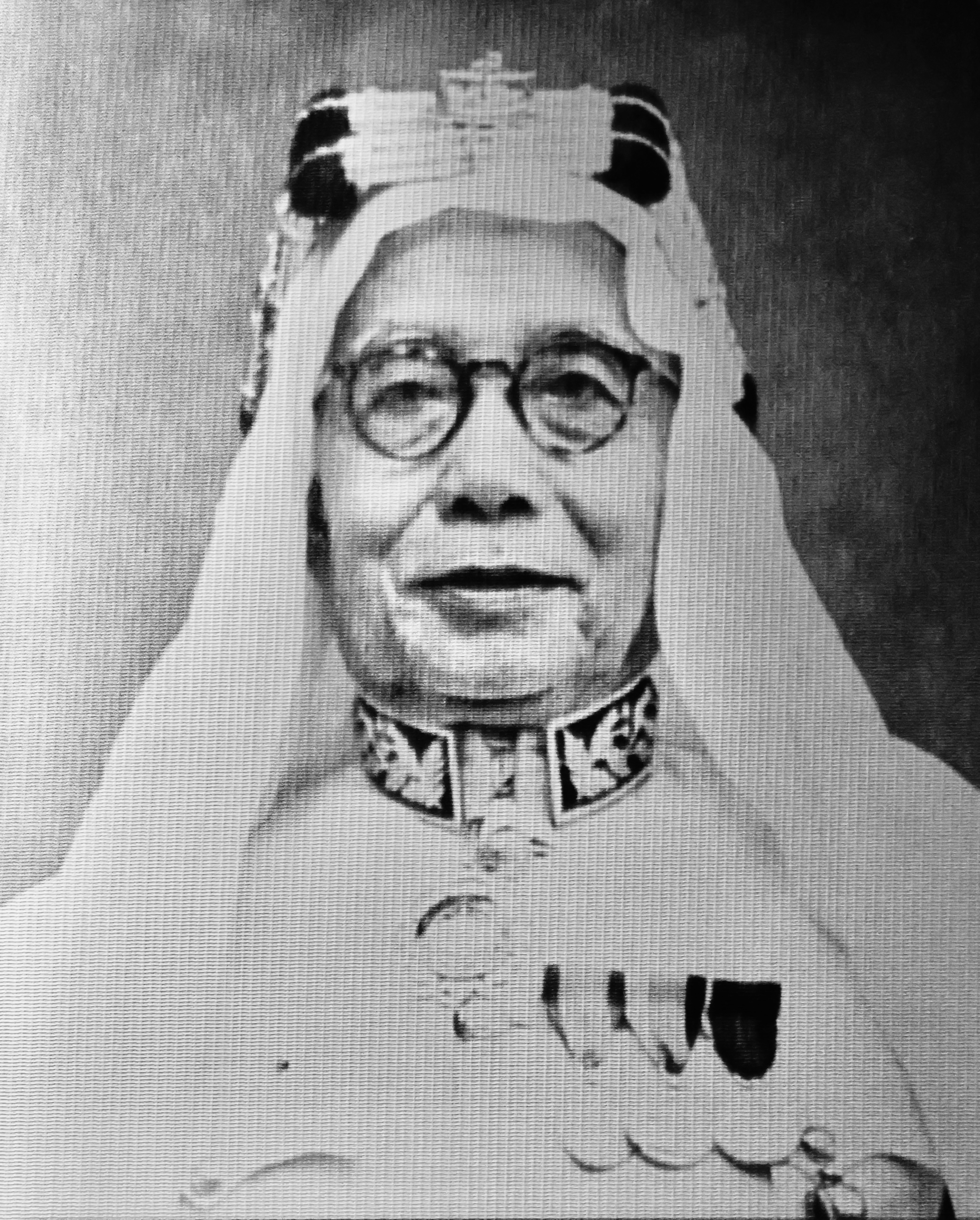
- Pengiran Muhammad Salleh, c. 1959
- Born: 1890; Kampong Pemancha Lama, Kampong Ayer, Brunei
- Died: 22 February 1969 (aged 79); Brunei
- Resting place: Royal Mausoleum, Bandar Seri Begawan, Brunei
- Known for: Member of Tujuh Serangkai committee from 1953 to 1954

Pengiran Muhammad Salleh bin Pengiran Anak Haji Muhammad (Note: The former spelling of his given name is "Pengiran Mohammad Salleh" rather than "Pengiran Muhammad Salleh," while his patronymic is written as "Pengiran Anak Mohammad" instead of "Pengiran Anak Muhammad.") (1890 – 22 February 1969) was a religious figure and noble cleric who held the position of Pengiran Di-Gadong in Brunei. Serving from 1968 to 1969, this title represents the second most senior rank within the wazir class of state officials. In addition, he was a member of the Tujuh Serangkai ("Seven Branches") committee from 1953 to 1954, and Brunei Islamic Religious Council (MUIB) from 1959 to 1969.

He was widely regarded as a devoted religious figure who dedicated much of his life to the development of Islam. A strong advocate for English-language education, he also championed the strict enforcement of Islamic laws, including the prohibition of alcohol consumption for Muslims and the regulation of Khalwat violations.

== Early life and education ==
Pengiran Muhammad Salleh was born in 1890 in Kampong Pemancha Lama, a village within Kampong Ayer. He attended balai ulama to study religious knowledge in Brunei.

== Career ==
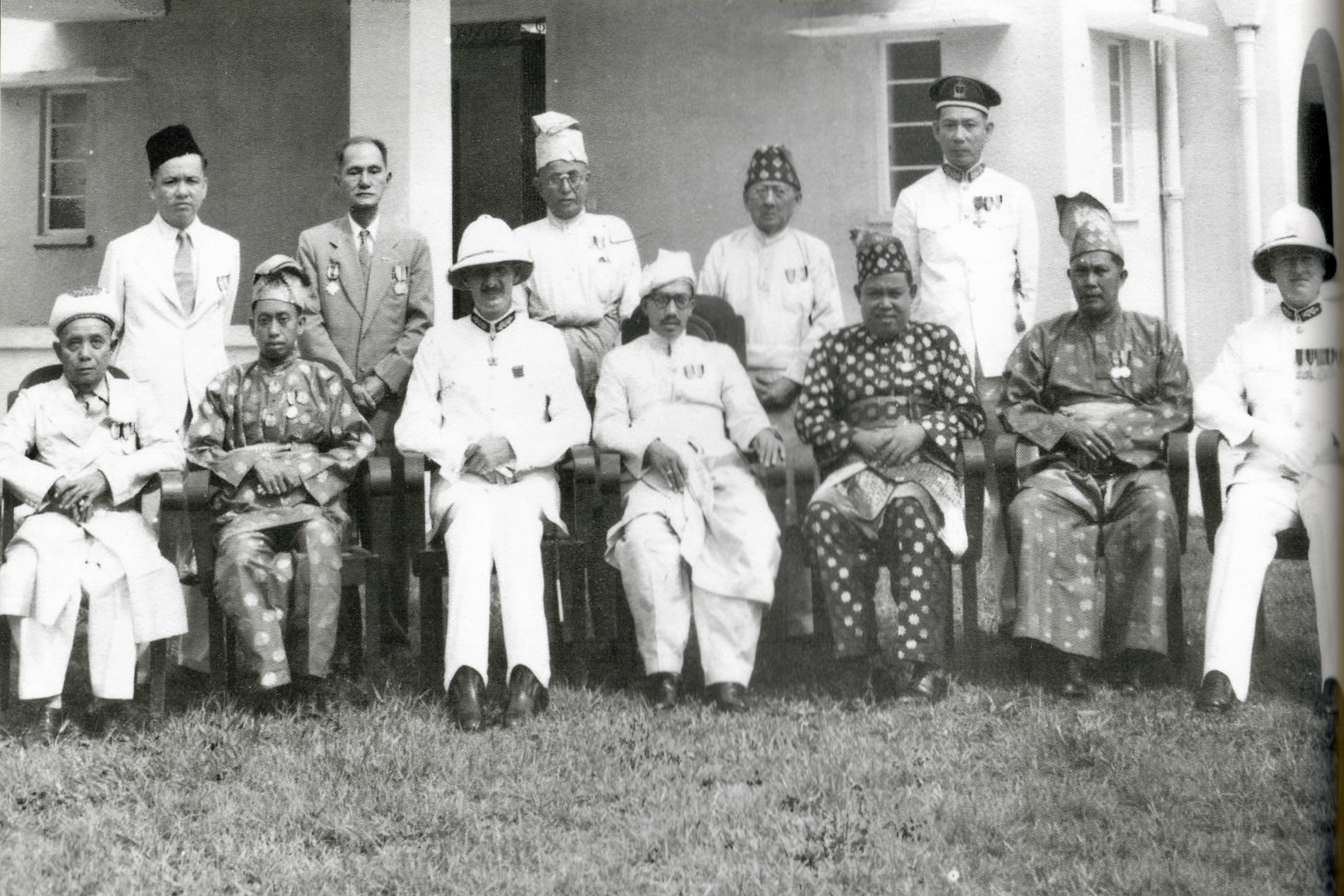
Pengiran Muhammad Salleh (seated first from the left) with other State Council members in 1951

Pengiran Muhammad Salleh played a crucial role in Brunei's religious administration due to his deep religious knowledge, beginning his service as kadi besar on 1 January 1940 during Sultan Ahmad Tajuddin's reign. He was first appointed to the State Council in July 1941 and reappointed in 1946, serving until Brunei's constitution was signed in 1959. A strong advocate for English-language education, he forwarded a request from the nationalist group Barisan Pemuda to the British Resident. He also proposed installing two flagstaffs—one for the Brunei flag and another for the Union Jack—at the Bubungan Dua Belas, a suggestion approved by the State Council. In 1948, he was appointed as an adviser to the Sharia Council.

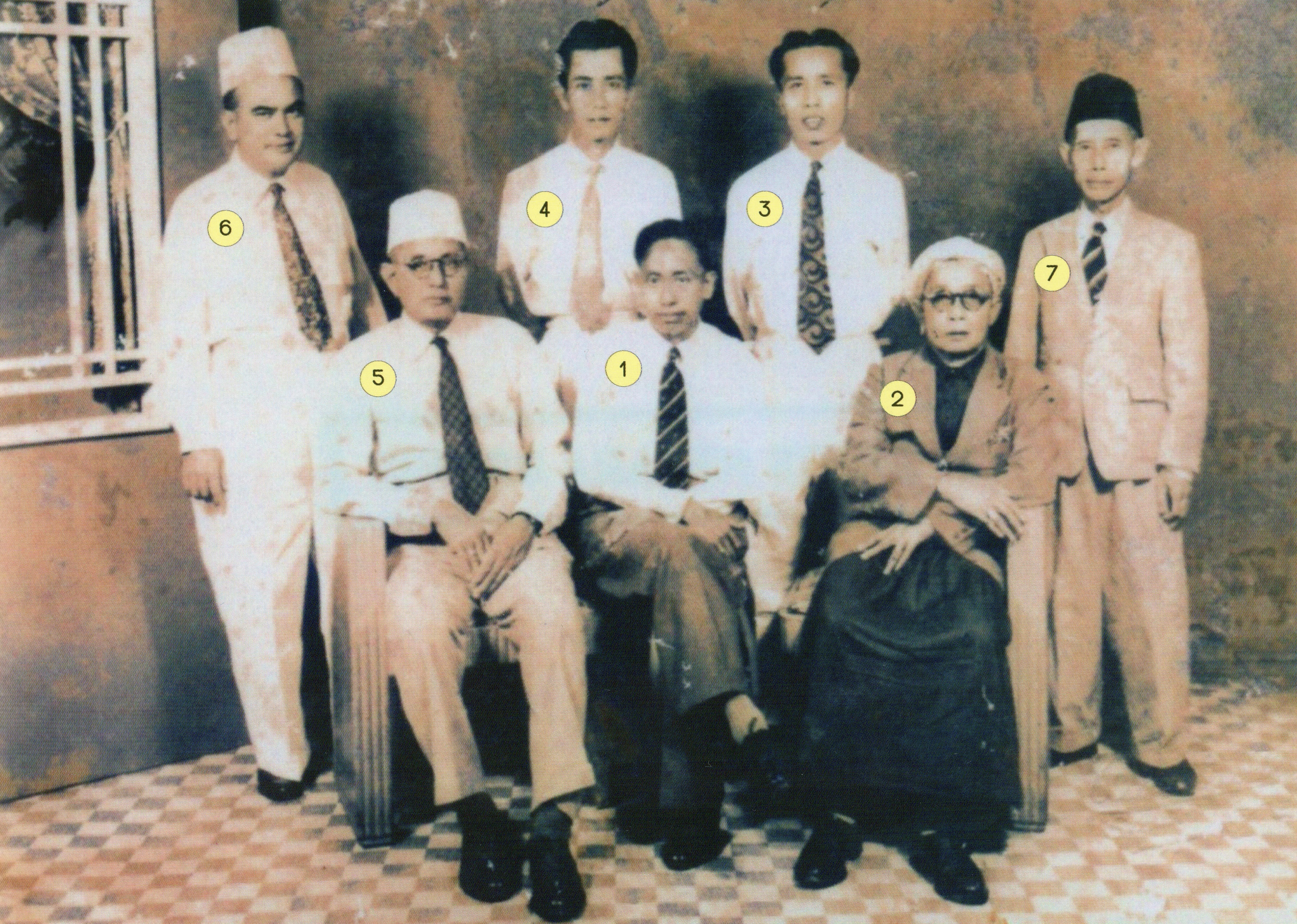
Pengiran Muhammad Salleh (no. 2) in a group photograph with the other six members of the Tujuh Serangkai

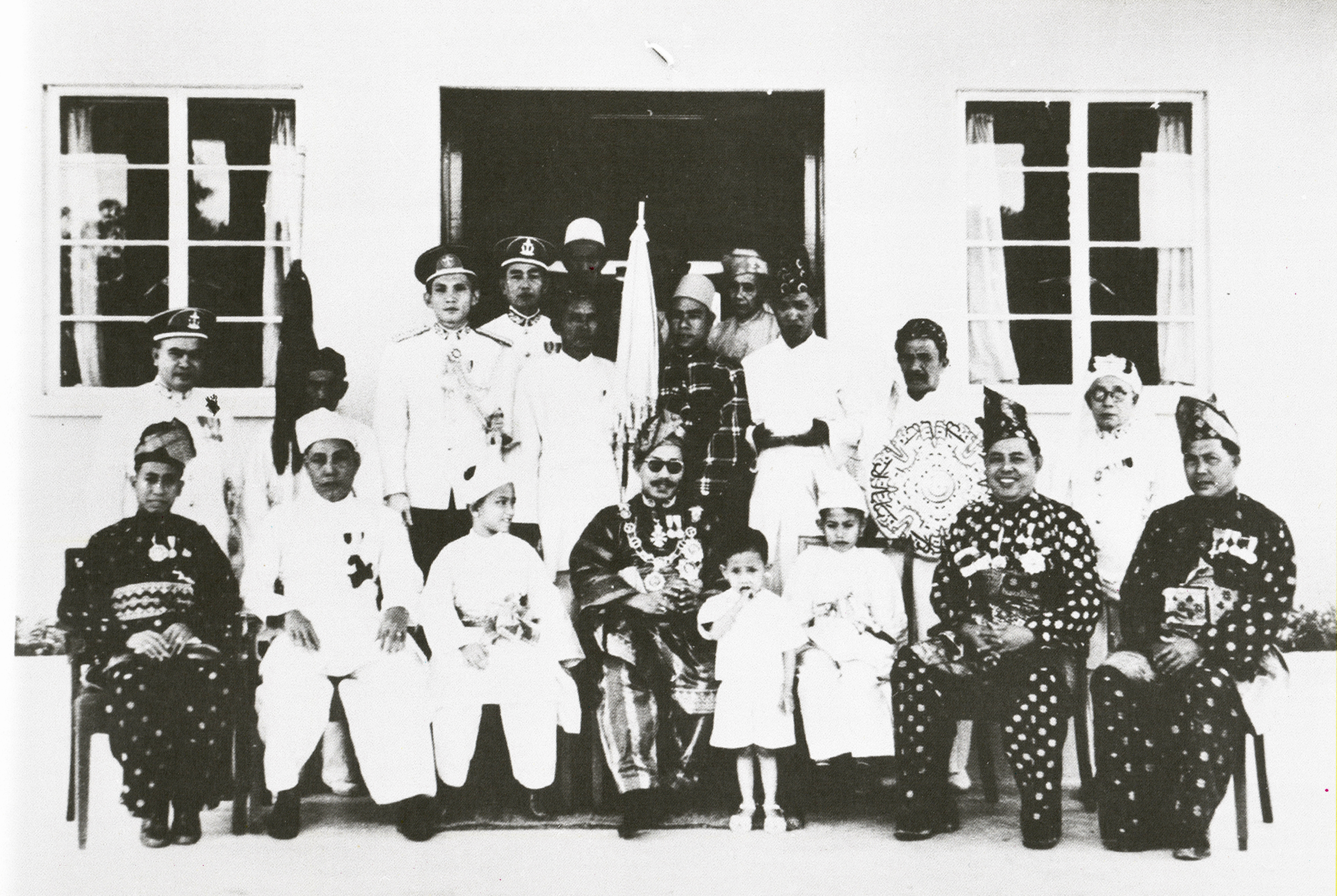
Pengiran Muhammad Salleh (standing first from the right) with Sultan Omar Ali Saifuddien III (centre) and other state dignitaries in 1953

Pengiran Muhammad Salleh, a member of the Tujuh Serangkai, was highly regarded for his fluency in Quranic recitation and deep knowledge of royal customs, as described by Sultan Omar Ali Saifuddien III in Syair Perlembagaan Negeri Brunei. The Tujuh Serangkai was formed in July 1953 as the first step toward drafting Brunei's proposed constitution, with its members, including wazirs, cheteria, manteri, and State Council members, tasked with gathering public opinion. As part of the committee, Pengiran Muhammad Salleh played a key role in compiling public feedback and constitutional analysis into a fifty-page report, which was submitted on 23 March 1954 and received an unexpectedly positive response from the authorities.

In 1955, Pengiran Muhammad Salleh joined the state religious council. He also led the Persatuan Kesatuan Islam Brunei, a religious organisation established in Brunei and Muara (now Brunei–Muara District) on 15 March 1956. Additionally, he was appointed as the district officer of Brunei and Muara on 12 June 1956.

In 1958, he warned that Muslims found guilty of violating Islamic laws would face the heaviest penalties permitted. His statement followed the proposed enforcement of a 1955 law prohibiting Muslims from purchasing and consuming alcohol in coffee shops and eateries. He expressed concern over the increasing violations of Islamic law, emphasising the need to prevent moral decline. Additionally, he stated that laws on Khalwat would also be strictly enforced, as rising cases had led to divorces. The proposal included limiting the number of shops permitted to sell alcohol to non-Muslims.

From 1959 to 1968, Pengiran Muhammad Salleh served as the state religious advisor. On 14 March 1959, during the absence of the sultan, who travelled to London to negotiate a written constitution for Brunei, he and Pengiran Muda Hashim were appointed as regents and began their duties, a role they had previously undertaken several times. On 7 July 1959, he accompanied Sultan Omar Ali Saifuddien III and Tunku Puan Besar Kurshiah during their visit to Kampong Ayer as part of the official state visit by Tuanku Abdul Rahman, the Yang Di-Pertuan Agong, and his wife to Brunei.

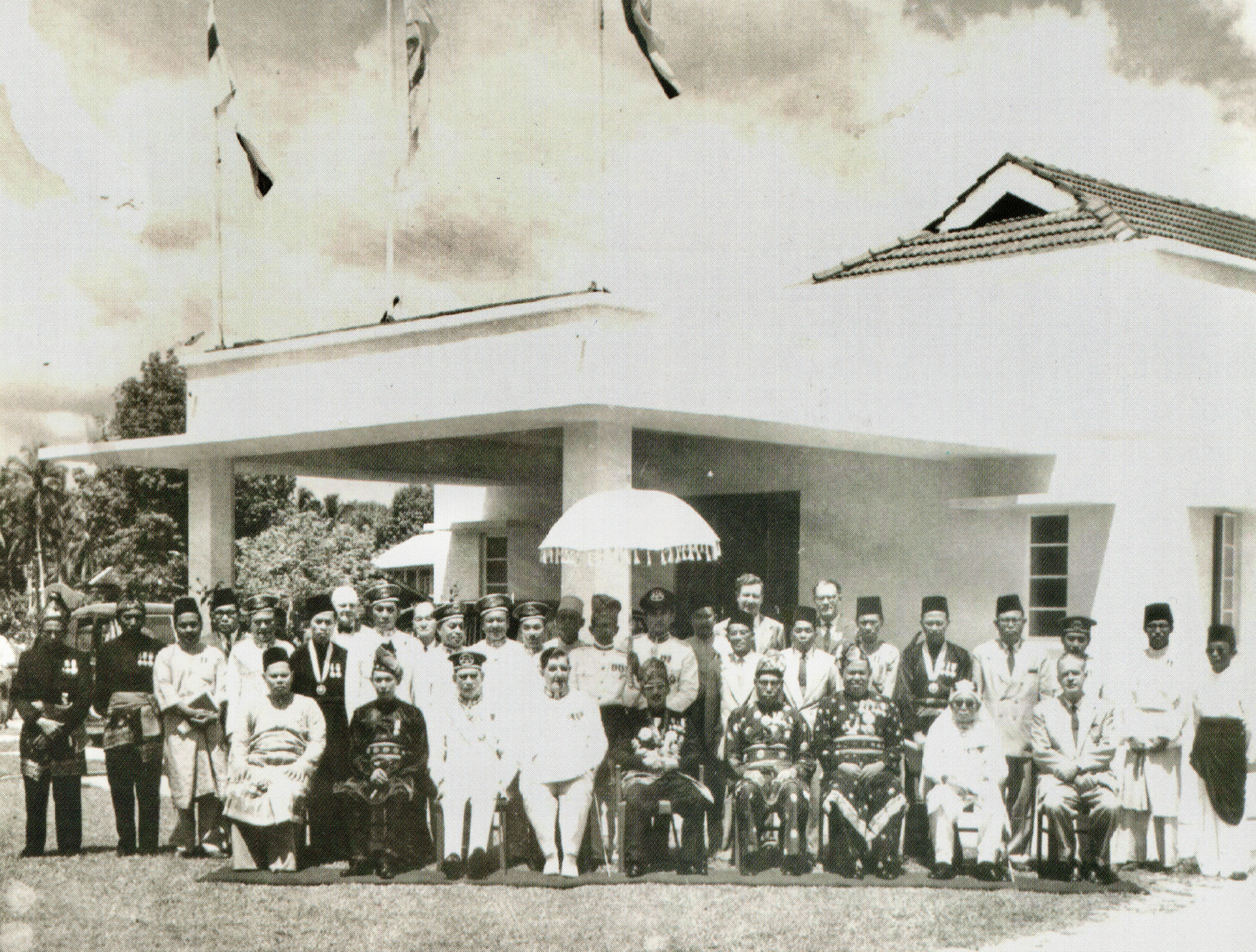
Pengiran Muhammad Salleh (seated second right) with 1959 LegCo members outside the Lapau

Pengiran Muhammad Salleh was among the dignitaries present at the signing of Brunei's written constitution and the new agreement with the United Kingdom at the Lapau on 29 September 1959. The following month, he was appointed to both the MUIB and the Adat Istiadat Council, which were established to oversee matters related to religion, customs, and the state court. He was one of the 20 individuals appointed, with his role as chairman of the newly formed MUIB on 15 October marking the council's creation to align religious laws and governance with the new constitution, succeeding the Sultan's previous position as its chair. Additionally, he became one of the inaugural ex-officio members of the newly established Legislative Council of Brunei (LegCo).

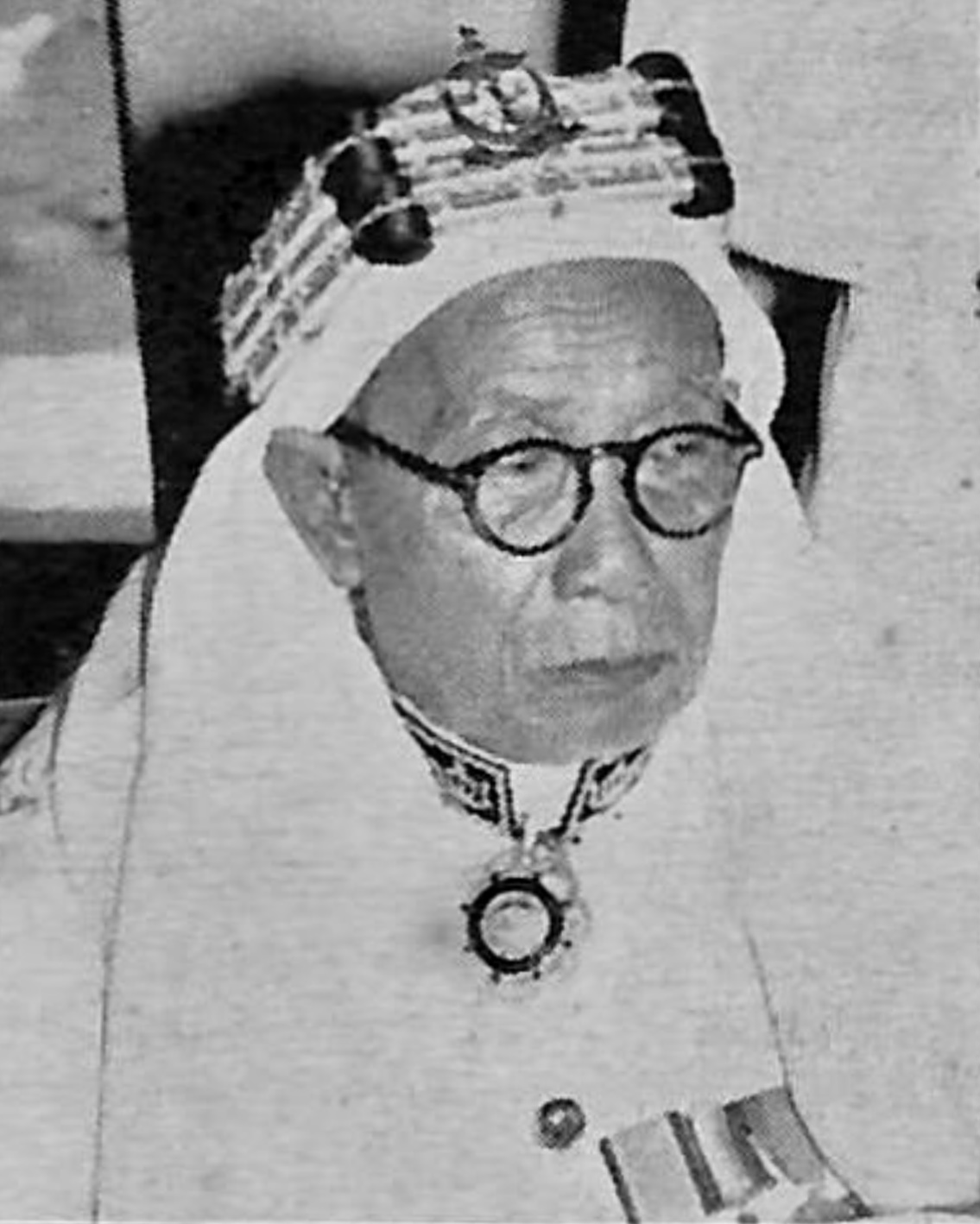
Pengiran Muhammad Salleh, c. 1960

From 1960 to 1966, he continued served as an official member of both the LegCo and the Executive Council. On 23 April 1960, Pengiran Muhammad Salleh was appointed as one of the seven members of the Regency Council. The following month, he was again appointed to the Regency Council, alongside wazirs, ministers, and LegCo members, to oversee the sultan's duties during his holiday in Malaya.

Pengiran Muhammad Salleh and his wife attended the Istiadat Bersiram ceremony for Princess Masna at Istana Darul Hana on 22 July 1961, alongside royal family members, LegCo members, and government officials. He was also present at the instalment ceremony on 14 August at Istana Darul Hana, where Prince Hassanal Bolkiah was officially declared as the new Pengiran Muda Mahkota (Crown Prince).

Pengiran Muhammad Salleh was appointed as a member of the Regency Council, formed during the sultan's pilgrimage in May 1962, with the council chaired by Pengiran Anak Mohamed Alam. Following the Brunei revolt in December, Pengiran Muhammad Salleh, along with other high-ranking officials, reaffirmed their unwavering loyalty to the sultan, vowing to sacrifice everything to combat treason and strongly condemning the rebellion led by A. M. Azahari and his followers, firmly rejecting Azahari's false claims of support from the Bruneian people.

He officiated the opening of Al-Madrasatul Ittihadiah in Kampong Tasek Meradun on 20 January 1966, delivering a speech and leading the recitation of Khatam Al-Quran before the event concluded with prayers and Maghrib prayer for Muslim attendees.

== Death and funeral ==
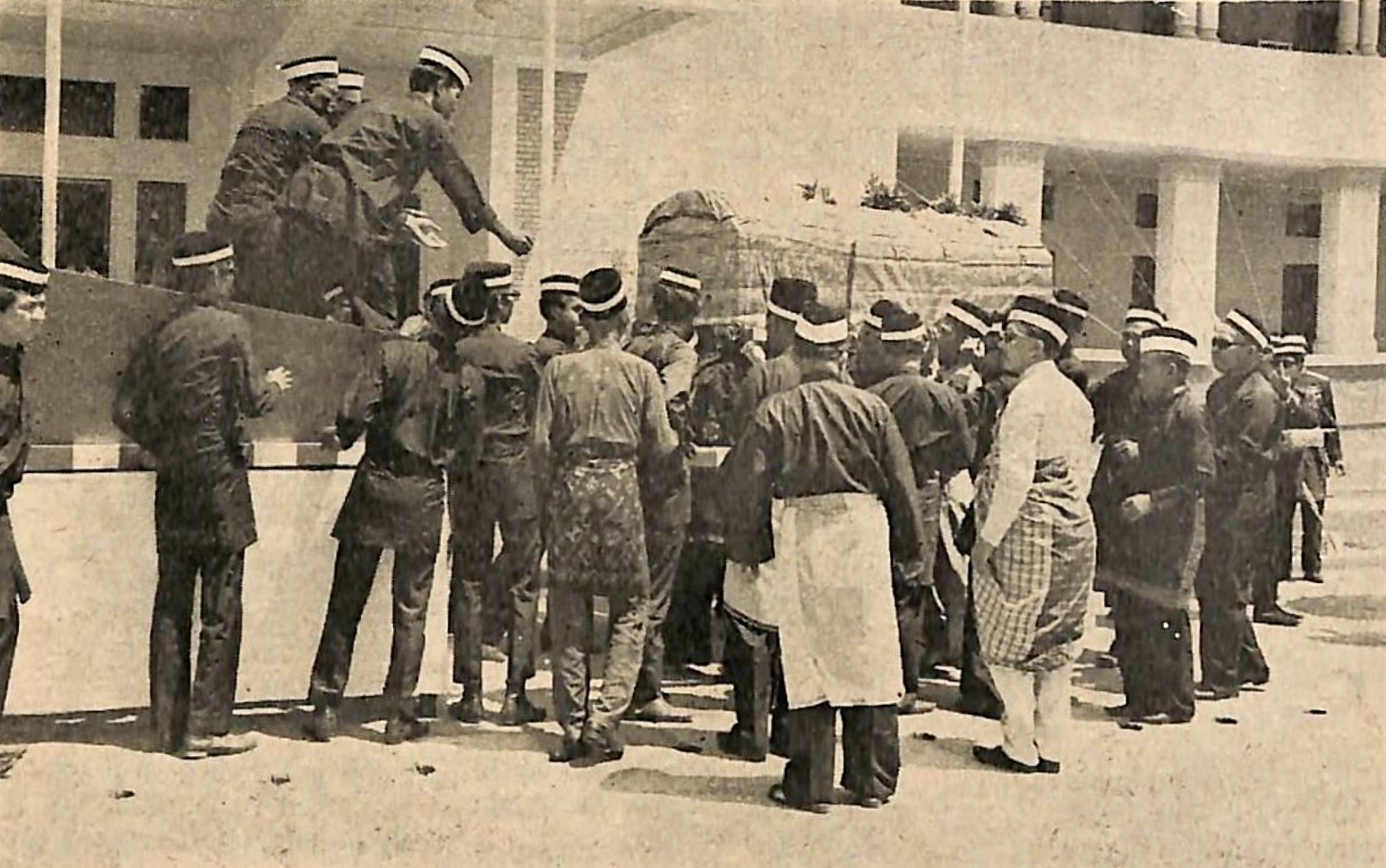
Pengiran Muhammad Salleh's body being placed on the bier in 1969

Pengiran Muhammad Salleh died on Saturday, 22 February 1969, at the age of 79. His death was seen as a significant loss to the progress of religion, the nation, and its people. His funeral was held on the following day, with a state funeral as per Sultan Hassanal Bolkiah's orders. A week-long period of mourning was declared, with flags flown at half-mast and a public holiday announced for Monday, 24 February. The funeral procession began at 11:00 a.m. from the Pengiran Muhammad Salleh's residence, accompanied by various royal and government officials, including the sultan, the British high commissioner, and other dignitaries. The procession made its way to the Royal Mausoleum, where the body was laid to rest. The funeral was marked by a traditional display of royal regalia, with the procession accompanied by ceremonial music. The burial was led by the Pengiran Muhammad Yusuf and other key officials, and the final prayers were recited by Ismail Omar Abdul Aziz.

== Titles, styles and honours ==
=== Titles and styles ===
Personal standard of Pengiran Di-Gadong Sahibul Mal

On 12 August 1958, Pengiran Muhammad Salleh was honoured by Sultan Omar Ali Saifuddien III with the cheteria title of Pengiran Shahbandar Sahibul Bandar, which carries the style Yang Amat Mulia. His final promotion came in the form of the wazir title Pengiran Di-Gadong Sahibul Mal, (Note: After his death, the title was shortened to "Pengiran Di-Gadong." In English, the title translates to "Lord of the Treasury." Pengiran Di-Gadong held the highest authority for state affairs and military matters, and overseeing the nation's wealth.) which was conferred at the Lapau on 9 May 1968, and styled as Yang Teramat Mulia Seri Paduka. (Note: His full title is "Yang Teramat Mulia Seri Paduka Pengiran Di-Gadong Sahibol Mal Haji Muhammad Salleh ibni Al-Marhum Pengiran Anak Haji Muhammad.")

=== Honours ===
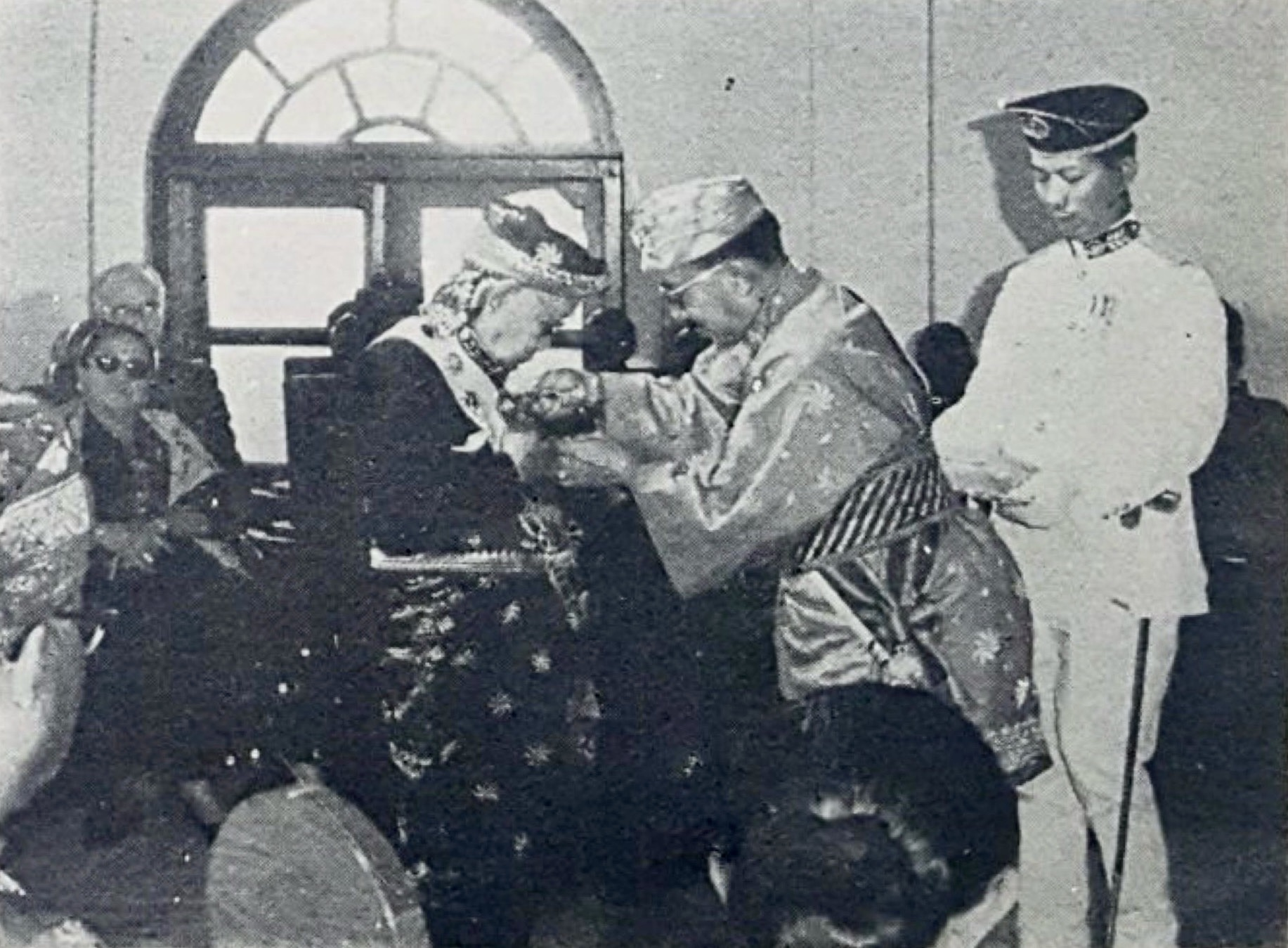
Pengiran Muhammad Salleh being awarded the DK by Sultan Omar Ali Saifuddien III in 1967

Pengiran Muhammad Salleh has been bestowed the following honours:

- Family Order of Laila Utama (DK; 23 September 1967) – Dato Laila Utama
- Family Order of Seri Utama (DK; 23 September 1962) – Dato Seri Utama
- Order of Seri Paduka Mahkota Brunei First Class (SPMB; 7 September 1964) – Dato Seri Paduka
- Order of Seri Paduka Mahkota Brunei Second Class (DPMB; 23 September 1956) – Dato Paduka
- Order of Seri Paduka Mahkota Brunei Third Class (SMB)
- Omar Ali Saifuddin Medal (POAS)
- Meritorious Service Medal (PJK; 23 September 1959)
- Campaign Medal (22 April 1965)
- Omar Ali Saifuddin Coronation Medal (31 May 1951)

=== Things named after him ===
- Pengiran Digadong Haji Mohd Salleh Religious School, a school in Kampong Sungai Kedayan 'B'
- Utama Mohammad Salleh Mosque, mosque named after him in Bangar Town

== Notes ==
Regnal titles
Preceded by Pengiran Anak Muhammad Hassan	Pengiran Temenggong Sahibul Bahar; 1968–1969	Succeeded by Pengiran Anak Khamis
