= State Council (Brunei) =

Former legislature of Brunei

- Majlis Mesyuarat Negeri
- National emblem of Brunei

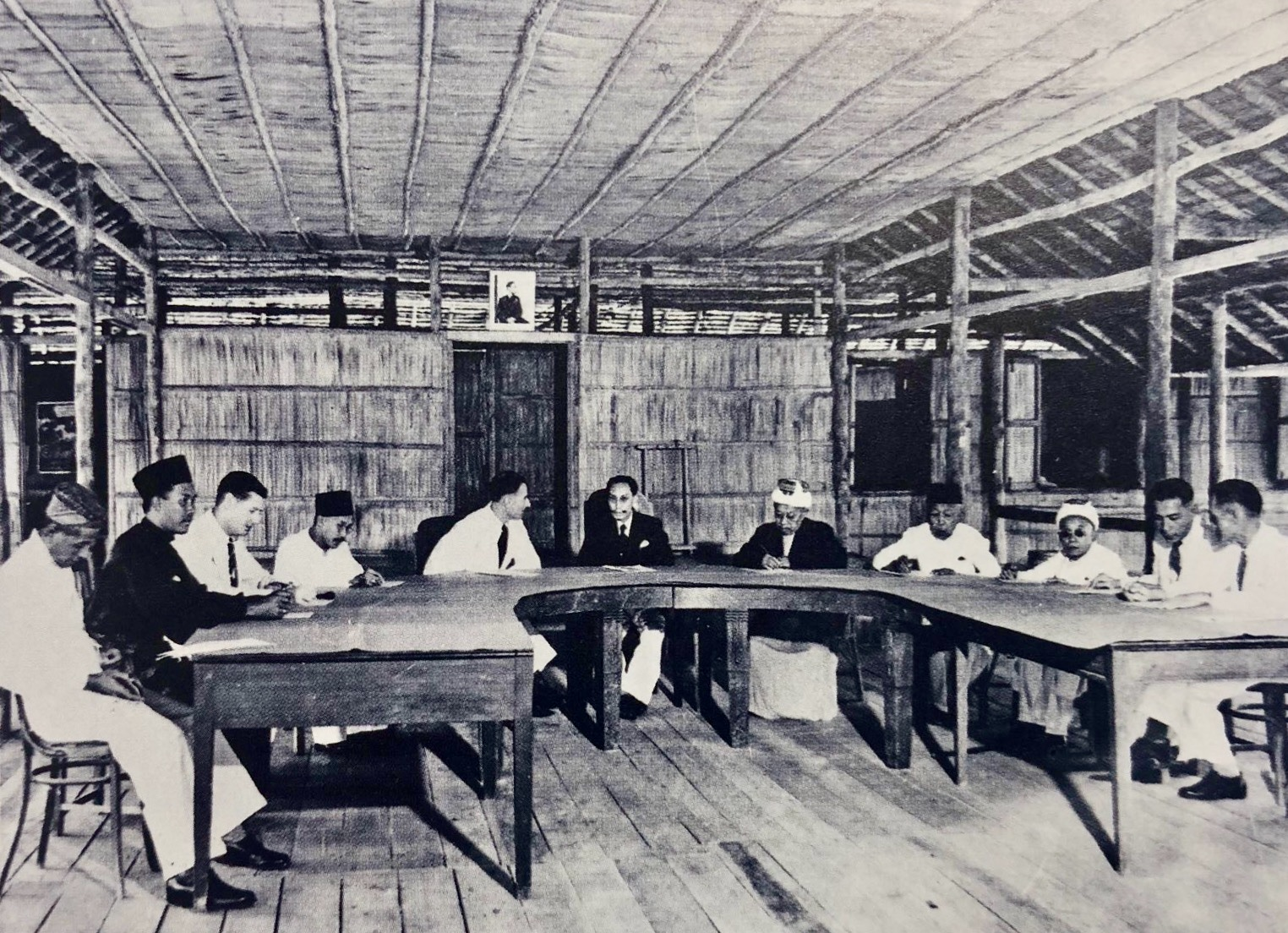
- John Peel and Sultan Ahmad Tajuddin chairing the 1948 State Council
- Type: Unicameral; Advisory body
- Status: Dissolved
- Abbreviation: State Council (SC)
- Appointer: Sultan of Brunei
- Constituting instrument: Supplementary treaty of 1905/1906
- Formation: 1906; 120 years ago
- Abolished: 18 October 1959; 66 years ago
- Succession: Legislative Council; Executive Council; Privy Council

The State Council (SC; Malay: Majlis Mesyuarat Negeri) was established in 1906 as a result of the British Residency system and offered a legislative structure for the administration of a protected state managed by the British government without direct jurisdiction of the Crown. First held in June of 1907, it served as a predecessor to the Constitution of Brunei under Sultan Omar Ali Saifuddien III for over fifty years, until September 1959. The State Council was distinct from the executive and legislative councils characteristic of Crown Colony government, while being a British colonial body.

The Sultan of Brunei maintained his sovereign power and the country was never a colony. Nonetheless, the State Council was important in maintaining the British government's semi-colonial control over the British residents of Brunei. The State Council, according to Sir Frank Swettenham, was a "great safety valve" that gave the angry Malay aristocrats and nobilities an opportunity for debate outside of the traditional meeting with the Sultan and his personal advisors. It has been noted that the State Councils set up on the Malay Peninsula sought to include Kapitan Cina as well as Malay district chiefs in the consultation process.

== Leadership ==
The State Council of Brunei used the same procedures as those implemented in Negeri Sembilan in 1889, as well as in Selangor and Perak in 1877. The council operated mostly under the Resident's direction during British colonial administration, and the Resident had considerable influence over state policies. The majority of the council's work was ceremonial; the resident dictated the topic and, if needed, used force to push through regulations that benefited the colonial interests. Even though council decisions were formally made in the Sultan's name, the Resident frequently predetermined them and confirmed them with little or no discussion. Among the council's duties were writing laws, selecting penghulu (headman) and khadi, distributing political funding and allowances, approving pardon requests, and confirming death sentences.

The Sultan-in-Council has constitutional power over the nation from 1906 forward, regardless of the Sultan's attendance. Official papers, rules, and directives were issued in the Sultan's name following preparation by the Resident and formal ratification by the Sultan. As a result of the Resident's apparent strong grip over Brunei's affairs, the council came to be seen as a rubber stamp for the Resident's orders over time. As one Resident pointed out in 1909, the State Council first convened rarely and for short periods of time because Residents felt these meetings were inefficient due to the elderly age of powerful members and the incapacity of other nobles to offer useful suggestions.

== Functions ==
=== Enactments ===
The legislation for Brunei was developed by the Resident's office and approved by the High Commissioner's office in Malaya before submission to the State Council for assent. Enactments after 1 April 1948 had to be approved by Kuching since the Governor of British Sarawak functioned as Brunei's high commissioner. The Attorney-General of the Straits Settlements re-enacted a measure in 1925 that demonstrated the council's limited authority. It stated that the High Commissioner and the Secretary of State for the Colonies held ultimate authority, and the council was unable to reject an Order in Council imposed by the British government.

Despite previous slowing down strategies the Superior Courts (Authorization) law was eventually ratified by the State Council in 1951, following an ultimatum from the Resident. On 14 November 1951, laws were passed jointly in Sarawak, North Borneo, and Brunei by the British government in an effort to create a unified judiciary throughout British Borneo. All legislation up until the late 1940s was written in English, forcing the Resident to interpret the laws to members who did not know the language. These members were especially cautious of laws that affected customary law.

=== State expenditure ===
The practice that restricted the Resident's ability to spend state funds without authorisation for expenses beyond authorised allocations is first mentioned in the proceedings of 22 December 1922. Due to the State Council's growing workload as Brunei's wealth surged in the late 1940s as a result of oil money, a Finance Committee was established in 1950 to oversee intricate financial processes and consider requests for unusual expenditures. In keeping with its growing role in governance, the council also got power over administrative appointments, pay adjustments, and other standard issues like pensions and land alienation.

=== Judiciary ===
Intermittently serving as a Supreme Court of Appeal, the State Council heard disputes involving religion. It reversed a judgement made on 29 July 1940, by the Chief Kathi, who needed the Sultan's approval before being appointed. The council also went into great depth discussing situations of adultery and disagreements between various social strata, that were considered offences of customary law (adat). It was able to confirm death sentences, as demonstrated by the 1915 case of a Sikh who was found guilty of killing resident E. B. Maundrell. However, these powers were later transferred by the Superior Courts (Authorization) Enactment.

== History ==
=== Establishment and early years ===
In 1888 Brunei was designated as a British protected state. The Supplementary Treaty of 1905/1906 created the role of a British Resident, who had the authority to advise the Sultan on matters involving government administration, becoming the most influential person in the Sultanate. The Resident surpassed the Sultan's 19th century authority by assuming wide and ambiguous administrative responsibilities and essentially taking over day-to-day operations. As the head of the State Council, the Resident had power over the whole executive, judicial, and legislative departments. He appointed four district officers who reported directly to him and oversaw the selection of conventional officials.

The planned topic for the State Council's first meeting, held on 29 June 1907, was Pengiran Bendahara Pengiran Anak Besar Muhammad's list of participants with constitutional rights, which changed dramatically over time. In 1920, Dato Abang Seruji was appointed as Dato Shahbandar by the Sultan after consultations with the High Commissioner and the Resident, while members of the council served until their resignation or death, with the understanding that the Sultan could remove them with the consent of the High Commissioner. From the 1920s to the 1950s, tensions between local and resident elites within the council were fuelled by disputes over representation and governance, worsened by a decision in 1927 to reduce the council's size following objections from Resident Eric Pretty in 1925, which persisted until the early 1950s.

=== Sultan Ahmad Tajuddin (1924–1950) ===
Sultan Ahmad Tajuddin had little power over the British Residents while he was a minor and even when he was crowned in 1940; they generally disregarded his views. As recorded in the council's archive of 16 March 1936, he regularly suggested changes to the council's procedures that would have limited the Resident's authority, such as making members keep notebooks of their decisions and give them early notice of meetings. During the Sultan's absence, he entrusted his chief Wazirs with overseeing the Resident's executive powers. The Sultan showed his displeasure with Brunei's political structure by often skipping council sessions, supposedly in opposition to the Resident's power.

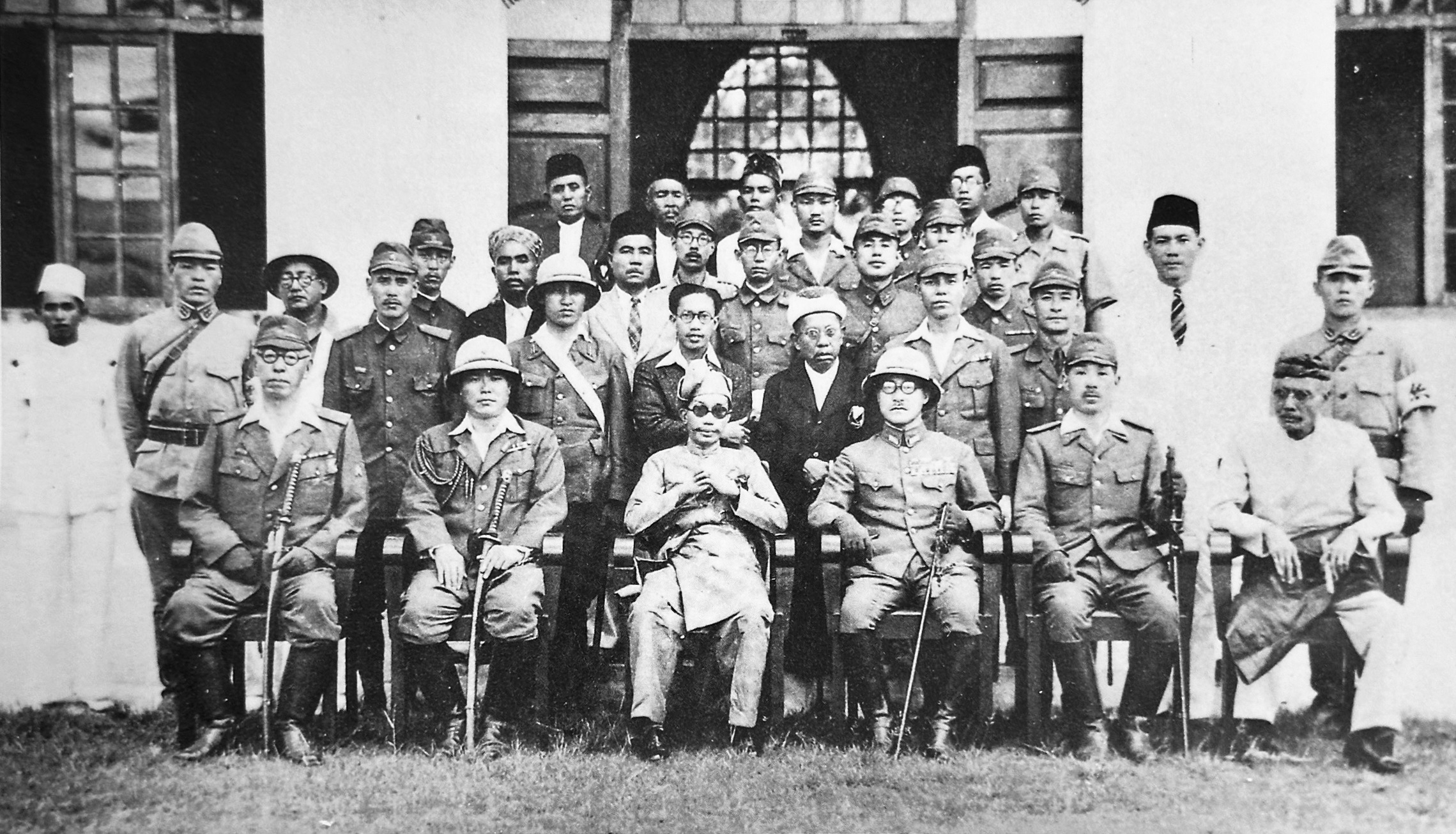
Sultan Ahmad Tajuddin (middle) with Japanese soldiers and administrators between 1941 and 1943

Even though the Sultan was still active in Kuching, he was less and less present at Council sessions after 1940, sometimes apologising to the Resident for his absence on health grounds. Brunei's nationalist views were strengthened by the Japanese occupation of Brunei, which lasted from 1941 to 1945. The Sultan nominated Pengiran Muhammad Salleh as the Chief Kathi on 20 July 1941. The Japanese notion of "Asia for Asians" affected Brunei's thinking. The council met under Japanese occupation even after the Sultan left, speaking in Malay and using the Jawi script, which gave previously excluded individuals a greater say. Members gained confidence and important administrative experience during this brief time, which helped to shape their confidence when the council reopened after the war.

The Sultan highlighted the significance of young Brunei men possessing suitable qualifications not being passed over for government employment by the Resident during the first State Council session following the Japanese occupation. Influential people like Pengiran Muhammad Salleh, who pushed for English education for Bruneians, echoed this call in later meetings. They also brought a letter from the nationalist group Barisan Pemuda (BARIP) to the Resident, requesting that English be taught. The resident recognised that the problem was urgent, but she also mentioned how difficult it was to locate trained personnel. The Chief Kathi's suggestion to place two flagstaffs—one for the Union Jack and one for the flag of Brunei—in the office while the Resident was in attendance was also approved by the Council at this time.

As nationalist feelings spread throughout Southeast Asia and Brunei in the aftermath of World War II, the British government had to exercise caution while dealing with the State Council because they could sense the people's growing political consciousness. Pengiran Muhammad Salleh's appeal against British Captain Blackburne's appointment as Secretary to the Resident and Magistrate on 6 August 1946, was a turning point in the case because of Blackburne's lack of understanding with Malay language and traditions. In response to the protest, the Resident proposed the appointment of a Malayan Civil Service officer, demonstrating a change in policy toward administrative appointments that take local sensibilities into account.

The Bruneian Resident's administration maintained strict financial rules in spite of rising oil revenue. Council members were refused requests for charity or relief, claiming lack of precedent or enough reasoning. Tensions over financial management at that period were highlighted by the frustration and resentment this caused among local members who wanted financial aid. Members in the local community became dissatisfied as a result of the Resident's constant denial of requests for more than predetermined allowances, which was a clear sign of frustration over financial assistance. The Sultan attempted to dispute Resident authority and use the State Council as leverage, but his requests for clearance of costs like as travel expenses to Australia were frequently denied or sent to higher authorities.

Sultan Ahmad Tajuddin nominated Pengiran Muda Tengah (later Sultan Omar Ali Saifuddien III) to the State Council on 7 August 1947. Tensions emerged after the 1948 Brunei-Sarawak Administrative Merger, which surrendered Brunei to the governance of Sarawak, since Bruneians despised Sarawak's historical ties to Brunei. Christopher Dawson and Arthur Grattan-Bellow, among other British officials, acknowledged that there were legal confusions surrounding their jurisdiction over Brunei, especially with regard to procedural problems with Residents passing legislation. They recognised that, until he delegated this authority, the Sultan of Brunei was the only one with the sovereign right to enact laws.

There was worry that laws made without his consent might not be enforceable. After the Sultan died in Singapore in 1950 while on a mission to resolve difficulties with British government, the situation worsened and the British realised they needed to introduce a constitution and restructure the State Council.

=== Sultan Omar Ali Saifuddien III (1950–1959) ===
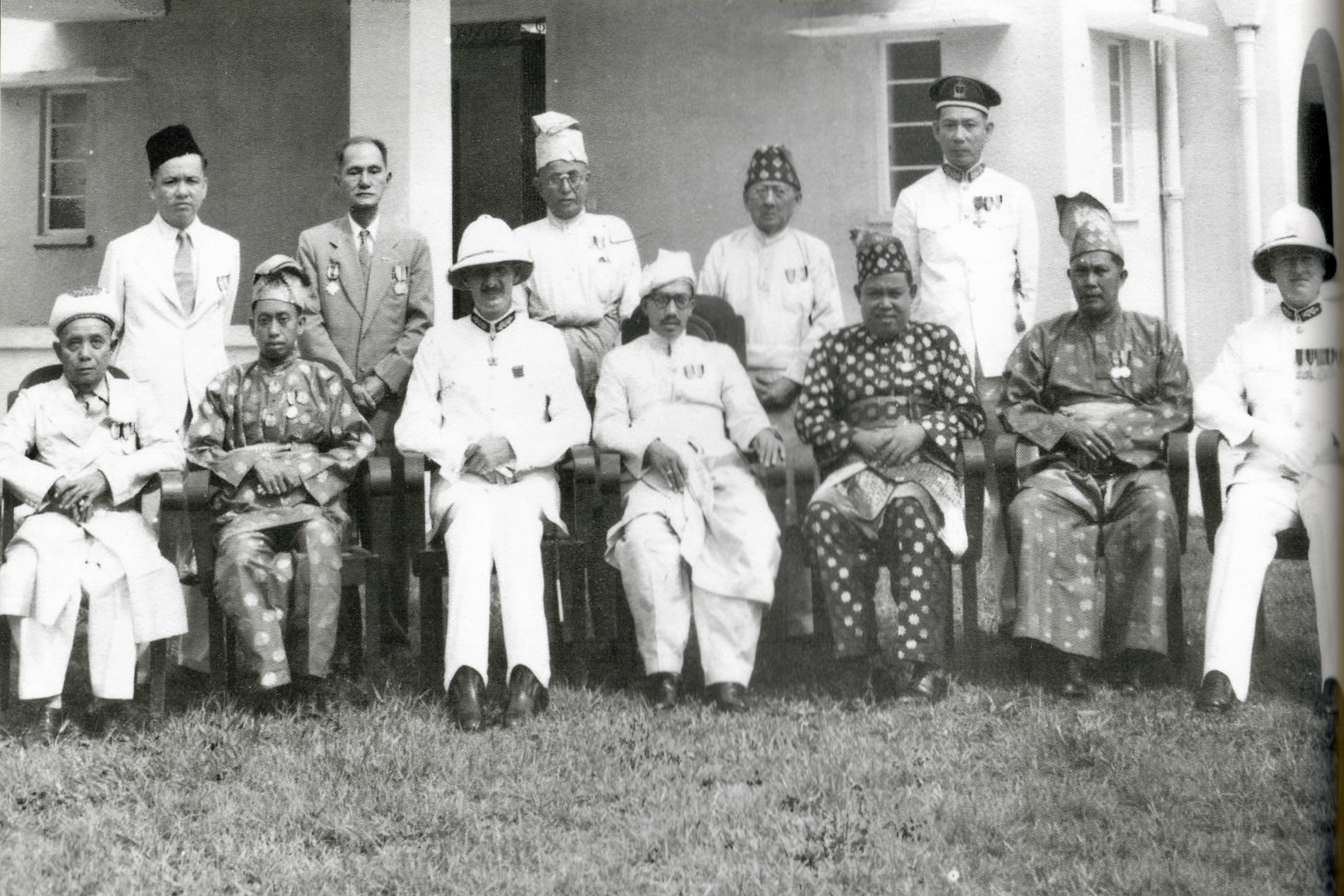
State Council members in 1951

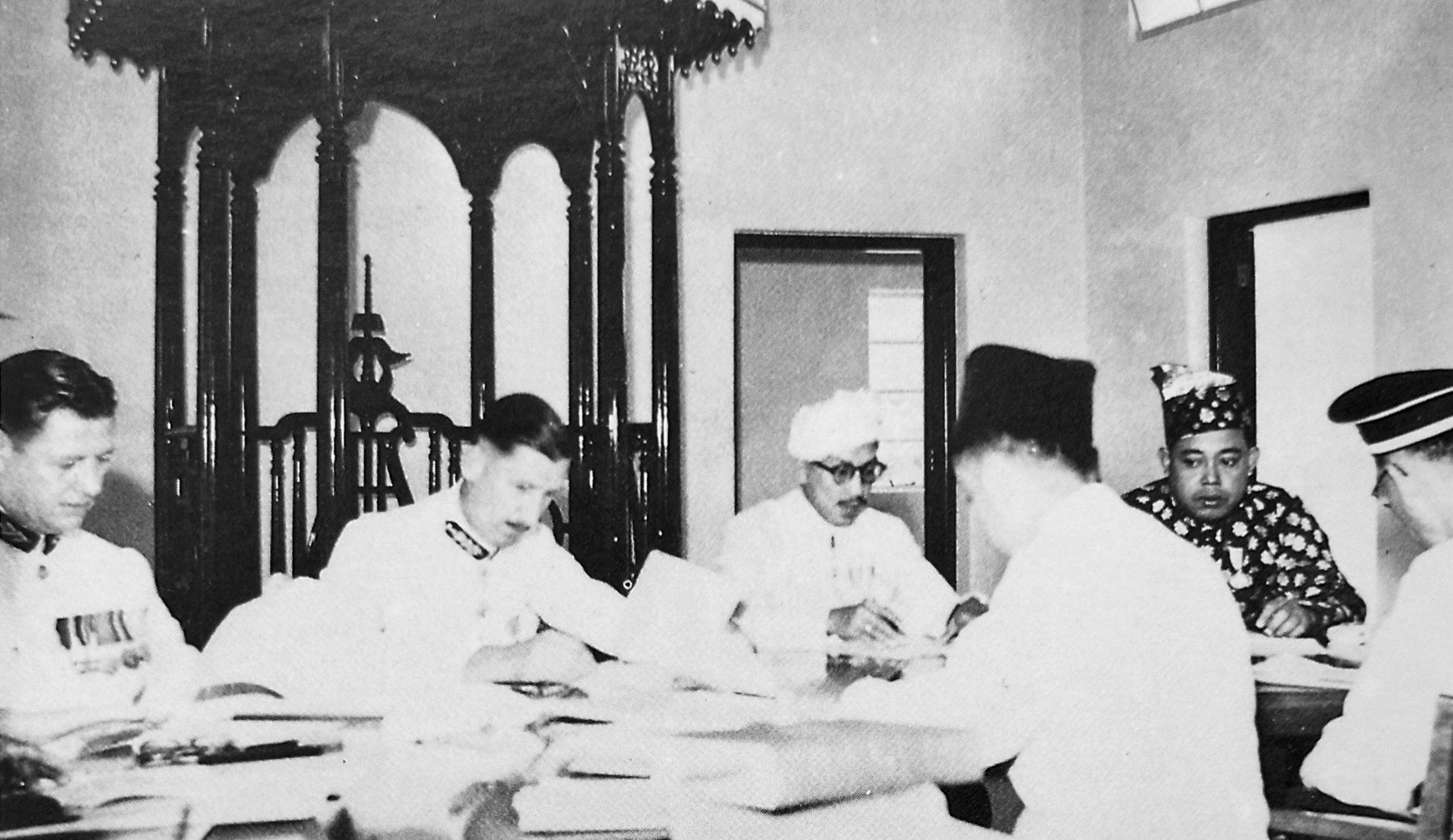
State Council discussions in 1952

Following his brother Sultan Ahmad Tajuddin's death, Sultan Omar Ali Saifuddin III significantly altered the State Council, increasing its power and influence as Brunei entered a new age. During his brother's absence, he assumed control over palace matters and won the backing of the British as a future Sultan who was anticipated to rule Brunei and maintain strong ties with Britain. Influenced by nationalist movements in neighbouring regions such as Indonesia and buoyed by increasing oil revenue, Bruneians started to demand long-overdue social welfare and educational facilities under British post-war reconstruction policies. These demands culminated in public demonstrations against the government upon A. M. Azahari's return in 1952.

The State Council's separation from administrative authority expanded under his rule as a result of more meetings and the Sultan's desire that the council make judgments on controversial issues. The council examined British legislative ideas, claiming numerical superiority, under the influence of nominees nominated by the Sultan, such as Ibrahim Mohammad Jahfar. In the meantime, the British looked for methods to hold onto power while posing as efficient administrators with commitments under treaties. On 30 September 1952, during a council meeting, the Resident's suggestion to give Kuching command over executions and long-term detainees was turned down. The council suggested building an existing jail in Sengkurong and said Brunei should have its own institution.

The State Treasurer Incorporation Enactment, which the British government had introduced in early 1953 to control financial administration and plug loopholes, was met with stiff resistance in the council. In opposition to the enactment, Ibrahim proposed that the Sultan-in-Council examine all financial issues to limit the State Treasurer's unrestricted power. Only the Resident and the State Treasurer supported the proposal, which eventually failed despite the Resident's promises that it sought to document current processes. State Treasurer D. H. Trumble proposed raising the corporate income tax from 20 to 30 percent per cent when he submitted the budget projections for that year in February 1953.

The Sultan's initial five-year development plan, which was unveiled in 1953, encountered difficulties as the council grew more critical of the Commissioner of Development and the government. Bruneians acknowledged the lack of skilled local candidates for numerous occupations, but they were against more foreign labour, believing it would limit their chances of holding government posts. The council posed an important challenge to the creation of the Constitution of Brunei, which took over six years after it was proposed in May 1953. Following 1954, nationalist educators selected as delegates from the recently established District Advisory Councils (DAC) had more influence over the council. In an effort to increase involvement in the legislative process, the Sultan eventually elevated these delegates from their original position as observers to full participation in the State Council.

When the State Council grew in November 1954, prominent educators including Abdul Manan Mohamed, Marsal Maun, and Pengiran Ali dominated as observers. As a result, the council began to operate more like an opposition body, publicly challenging and condemning the policies of the British government. Public meetings allowed observers to openly address the council, occasionally impeding the flow of business. High Commissioner Anthony Abell criticised the difficulty of calling regular meetings of the council and attacked its attempts to remove the Resident from decision-making authority over executive affairs.

The State Council swiftly worked to establish the Brunei Constitution and a new deal with the British government starting in 1954, frequently going against the Sultan's promises to the British government. Resident John Orman Gilbert had difficulties persuading the council to follow recognised norms, which led to his expulsion from Brunei when members criticised him for unnecessary spending. In 1957, at a meeting with the council, Resident Gilbert confirmed that Gadong was reserved for the people of Kampong Ayer who want to move to a different location. With the adoption of Brunei's first written constitution in September 1959, the council period came to an end and the Legislative, Executive, and Privy Councils took its place. However, following a revolt in 1962, the articles of the Constitution were suspended, resulting in continuous emergency government.
