= Constitutional history of Brunei =

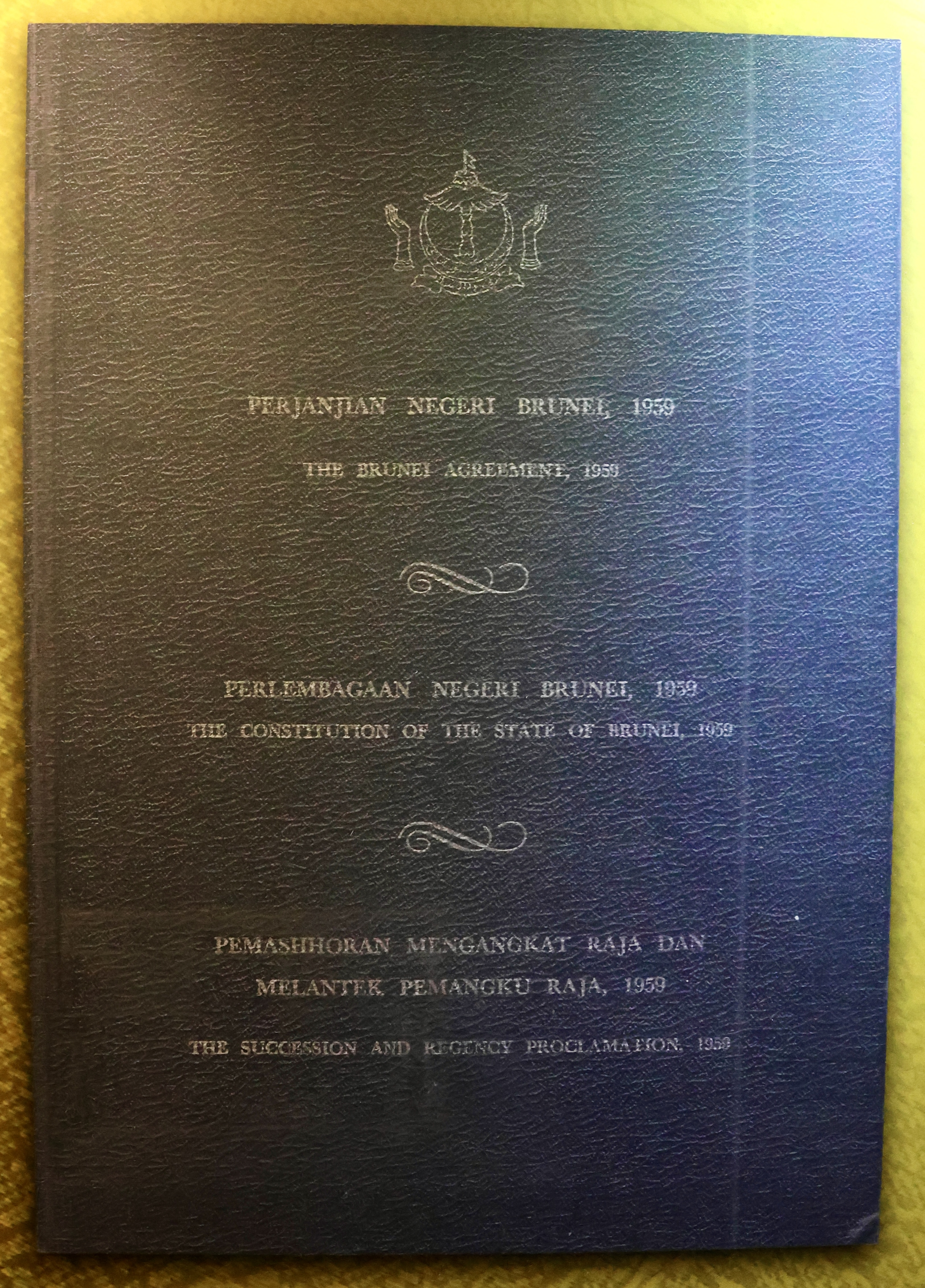
Constitution of Brunei printed on the Brunei History Centre wall

Although Brunei attained full independence on 1 January 1984, it was able to establish autonomous government in 1959. According to the Constitution of Brunei, the Sultan of Brunei has a great deal of political authority and can reject the choices made by the Executive Council as long as he justifies it in writing. The Privy Council, which counsels the Sultan on questions of compassion, constitutional modifications, and honorific designations, the Legislative Council, which is supposed to consist of both elected and appointed members, and District Councils were also formed under the constitution. As the head of state and religion, the Sultan Brunei is in charge of the legislative, executive, and judicial departments of government. Brunei is a unitary state with a constitutional monarchy. Islam is the recognised state religion.

== Early agreements ==
The British colonial stance toward Brunei started to gradually shift in the years following World War II. Brunei's aristocrats began to wonder about their historical ties to the British. Sultan Ahmad Tajuddin's proposal to amend the 1905–1906 Treaty was turned down, but his successor could not have the same request turned down by the British Colonial Office. In 1950, Sultan Omar Ali Saifuddien III took over as the 28th Sultan of Brunei. The country was already a major oil producer and rapidly approaching great wealth. The political instability that had previously been brought about by a dispersed and sometimes self-serving aristocracy, particularly the ancient territorial chiefs, had been removed by the British government introduction of a Western-style administration.

The Colonial Office believed that the notion of creating a Brunei constitution was premature and had little prospect of success for a number of reasons when it was first proposed in the late 1930s. First, it seemed improbable that the governments of North Borneo and Sarawak would voluntarily cede their independence and establish themselves as Crown Colonies. British authorities resisted this notion, even though they thought Sultan Ahmad Tajuddin was a weak monarch who could accept it. Second, the thrifty British government could not afford to assume the financial burden of taking over these governments. Third, another major barrier was the absence of political development in these areas.

The British government was explicitly acknowledged in the Agreement of 1888 and the Supplementary Agreement of 1905–6 to guarantee Brunei's rightful succession to the monarchy. Sultan Omar Ali Saifuddien III desired that an edict that would take effect on the same day as the new Constitution would clearly and unambiguously demonstrate the customs and unwritten law controlling the succession. The Colonial Office showed little interest in substituting a Constitution for the Treaty.

== Tujuh Serangkai ==
The first step towards creating a written constitution for Brunei was for Sultan Omar Ali Saifuddien III to set up a commission to get opinions from people living in each area. The Syair Perlembagaan Negeri Brunei, 'Brunei State Constitution Poem' by the Sultan himself mentions this commission in stanza 17. Due to its seven appointed members, the Jawatankuasa Penasihat Perlembagaan (JKPP), formerly known as the Jawatankuasa Menyiasat Perlembagaan (JKMP), is also known as Tujuh Serangkai ("seven branches") in July 1953. The Sultan has shown his care for the people's ideas and his desire to take them into consideration despite his absolute authority by taking the initiative to organise this committee. Their responsibilities included gathering public opinion on a proposed Constitution, creating a thorough report, and offering the Sultan advice on forming district councils and restructuring the State Council in addition to drafting the Constitution.

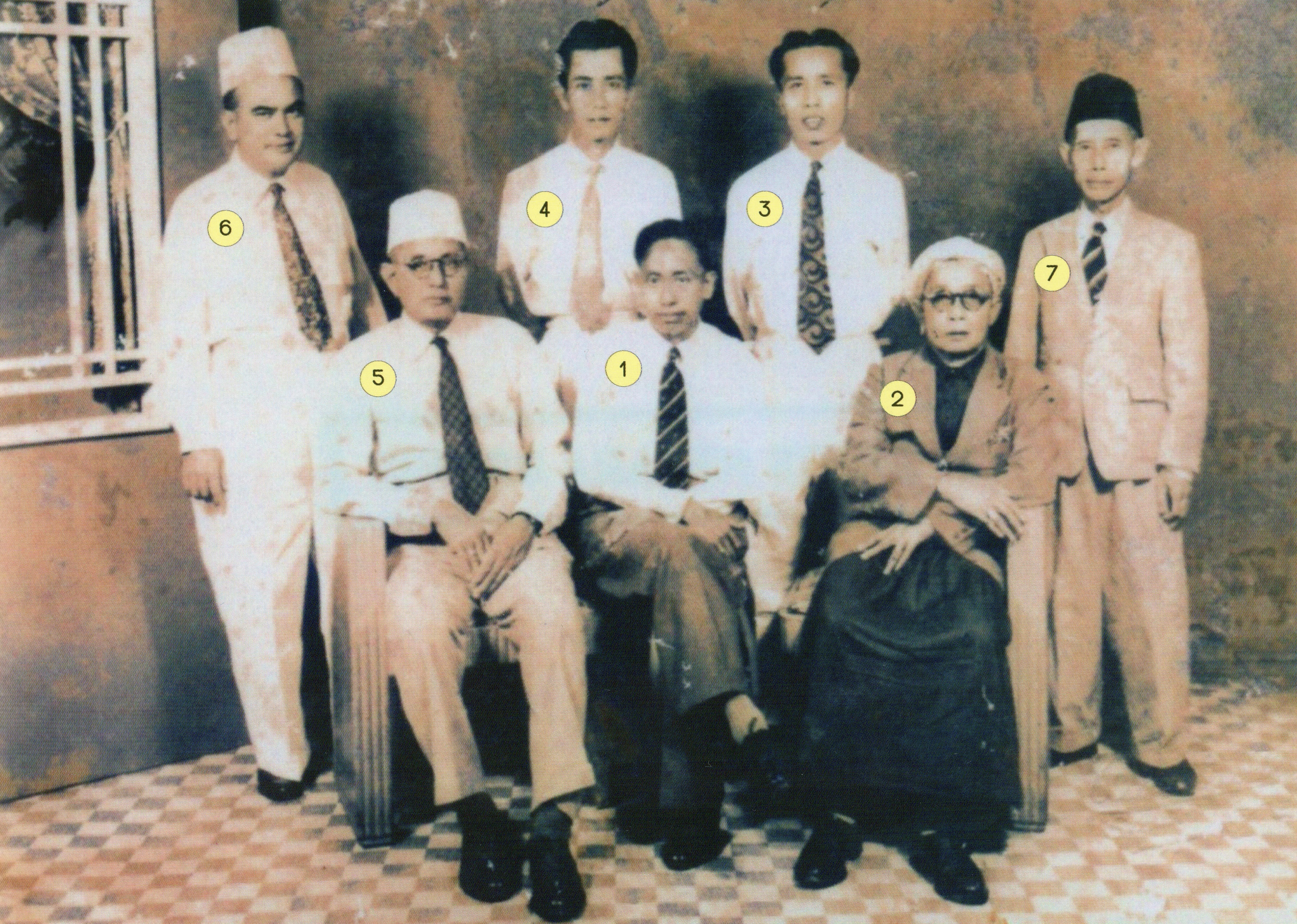
Tujuh Serangkai members in a group photo

The people appointed to the seven positions of the Tujuh Serangkai listed by B. A. Hussainmiya and Nicholas Tarling (2011) include Wazirs, Pengiran-Pengiran, Pehin-Pehin, State Council members, and other persons. The members are:

- Chairman: Pengiran Maharaja Lela Pengiran Muda Abdul Kahar bin Pengiran Bendahara Pengiran Anak Haji Muhammad Yassin
- Secretary: Pengiran Muhammad Yusuf bin Pengiran Abdul Rahim
- Pengiran Haji Muhammad Salleh bin Pengiran Anak Muhammad
- Pengiran Muhammad Ali bin Pengiran Haji Muhammad Daud
- Pehin Orang Kaya Digadong Seri Diraja Dato Laila Utama Haji Muhammad Yusof bin Pehin Jawatan Dalam Haji Muhammad Hussain
- Pehin Orang Kaya Shahbandar Haji Ahmad bin Haji Mohd. Daud
- Abu Bakar bin Jambol

On the primary assignment given to the Tujuh Serangkai members by Sultan Omar Ali Saifuddien III, it is to gather the perspectives and ideas of every Bruneian citizen on the proposed Constitution of the Sultan. Differentiate between those who reside in rural and urban regions. They also have the responsibility of compiling an extensive report founded on the ideas and viewpoints of the people. They are also tasked with serving as advisors to the Sultan throughout the drafting of the Constitution.

From 13 to 19 July 1953, Belait District hosted the inaugural Tujuh Serangkai visit. From 27 July to 7 August 1953, Tutong District was the location of the second visit. From 13 to 19 August 1953, the group proceeded to Temburong District. Visits to Muara and Brunei Districts was place from 1 September to 5 October 1953, to wrap off the tour. Following the district visits, a report was written outlining the support and agreement of the populace with Sultan Omar Ali Saifuddien III's constitutional ambitions. Stanzas 18 and 19 of the Syair Perlembagaan Negeri Brunei honour the Tujuh Serangkai's historic tour of the whole State of Brunei, which demonstrated the government's commitment to granting the Sultan's wish for a written Constitution.

Citizens used the committee as a platform to voice their complaints about the administration in addition to expressing their political goals. As per usual, the nationalist educators took center stage and made their demands loudly known, particularly using their go-to nationalist catchphrase, "Brunei for Bruneians." The government benefited greatly from the gatherings as they allowed the younger, educated population to express their true opinions and acted as a "safety valve" for pent-up emotions.

On order to research and contrast the constitutions of the states on the Malay Peninsula, the Tujuh Serangkai conducted surveys in each state in 1954. During this investigation, which lasted for about two weeks in January, the members traveled to Johore, Selangor, Kelantan, Negeri Sembilan, Pahang, Singapore, and Kedah, according to a number of sources, including Mohd Jamil Al-Sufri (1992) and B. A. Hussainmiya (1995). Under Sultan Omar Ali Saifuddien III, Brunei's own constitution was drafted with significant guidance from their results.

On 23 March 1954, the Tujuh Serangkai sent Sultan Omar Ali Saifuddien III a 50-page Malay report. The Secretary of the committee, Pengiran Mohd Yusuf, wrote this paper in Malay summarising the results of surveys carried out in Brunei's districts and the constitutional analysis of the Malay Peninsula states. The committee's unanimous conclusions surprised the authorities, who considered the report to be "sound and moderate in tone."

== Drafting and proposals ==
During the constitution-making process in Brunei, the initial draft prepared by Sir Anthony Abell and his team initially aligned with the aspirations of the local Malay constitutional committee but also safeguarded Brunei's sovereignty. Discussions between British Resident John Orman Gilbert, Abell, the Sultan and his two Wazirs (Pengiran Bendahara and Pengiran Pemancha) on 16 to 17 December 1954, in Istana Darul Hana, resulted in minor revisions before submission to the Colonial Office, where they were reportedly unanimously approved. However, by mid-1955, Sultan Omar Ali Saifuddien III began demanding changes to ensure his Wazirs' roles in the Legislative and Executive Councils, which disrupted the British plans for Brunei's legislative reorganisation. This conflict escalated tensions and complicated the constitution-making process significantly.

The creation of Menteri Besar was suggested as a replacement for the British Resident by the Constitutional Committee, which reflected the ambitions of Brunei's politically engaged Malays. The Sultan first acknowledged with the British that the move would require some time because there was not a qualified local candidate. He also believed Abell's assurances that controversial issues from earlier offers would not be consisted of into the new constitution. If the Sultan had had his way, a constitution that included committee suggestions like moving authority from a Resident to a Menteri Besar might have been finished within two years after his declaration. The Partai Rakyat Brunei (PRB), which expressed nationalist goals and called for a say in government, complicated things in 1956 and presented fresh difficulties for the British throughout the drafting process.

A. M. Azahari's PRB, which promoted independence via constitutional routes while upholding the Sultan's position as a constitutional monarch, was well-liked in Brunei in 1956. Though colonial leaders sympathized with the PRB's objectives, they saw the organisation's demands for equal wages, workers' welfare, ministerial government, and general elections as too extreme. Because of this resistance, Sultan Omar Ali Saifuddien III became more adamant in his opposition to British recommendations, which resulted in significant additions and deletions from the draft constitution in order to preserve his local power.

== London negotiations ==
=== 1957 Brunei Negotiations ===
In order to discuss the constitution with the British Government, Sultan Omar Ali Saifuddien III dispatched a mission to London in 1957. The final day of negotiations were moved from their original 27 September date to 30 September date. The Sultan took part in three sessions held at the Colonial Office: Sir Alan Lennox-Boyd, Secretary of State for the Colonies, convened the first meeting on 11 September; John Martin chaired the second meeting on 27 September; and the Sultan participated in the third meeting on 30 September.

The Rang Undang-Undang Perlembagaan Negeri Brunei, 'Brunei State Constitution Bill', which was written in Brunei House in Singapore by Panglima Bukit Gantang, was the main focus of the 1957 London Negotiations. The nomination of the Menteri Besar, the State Secretary, and the National Finance Officer were important subjects. The British, however, proposed delaying these plans until six months after the Constitution went into effect. The High Commissioner's Reserved Power should not be removed from the constitution, according to the British. The three territories of Borneo were to be united, while Sultan Omar Ali Saifuddien III wanted to lessen British influence and write Brunei's own constitution. Ultimately, the Sultan's hopes for Brunei's constitutional autonomy were not entirely realised by the negotiations.

In Brunei, constitutional talks focused only on the Sultan and the British government, in contrast to Malaya where parties such as the Alliance Party and State Sultans were participating in the negotiations. The PRB, under the leadership of Azahari, argued for a constitutional monarchy with elected officials but was left out of negotiations. Azahari attempted to interact with British authorities in 1957, but the Sultan's resistance prevented the PRB's suggestions from being taken seriously. As a result, Azahari accused the British of ignoring the ambitions of the people and would lead up to the 1962 Brunei revolt.

=== 1958 Brunei Negotiations ===
The 1957 London negotiations were brought back up in Brunei in 1958. At a meeting held at Istana Darul Hana on 27 October, Sultan Omar Ali Saifuddien III and Sir Anthony Abell discussed the results of the London negotiations. Finalising the main ideas from the 1957 discussions was the goal. Subsequently, on 2 November 1958, a special conference presided over by the advisor to the Sultan decided to send a team headed by the Sultan personally to London for more constitutional talks. Due to their knowledge of laws and positions as advisors on constitutional issues, Dato Panglima Bukit Gantang and Neil Lawson were selected to go with the group.

=== 1959 Brunei Negotiations ===
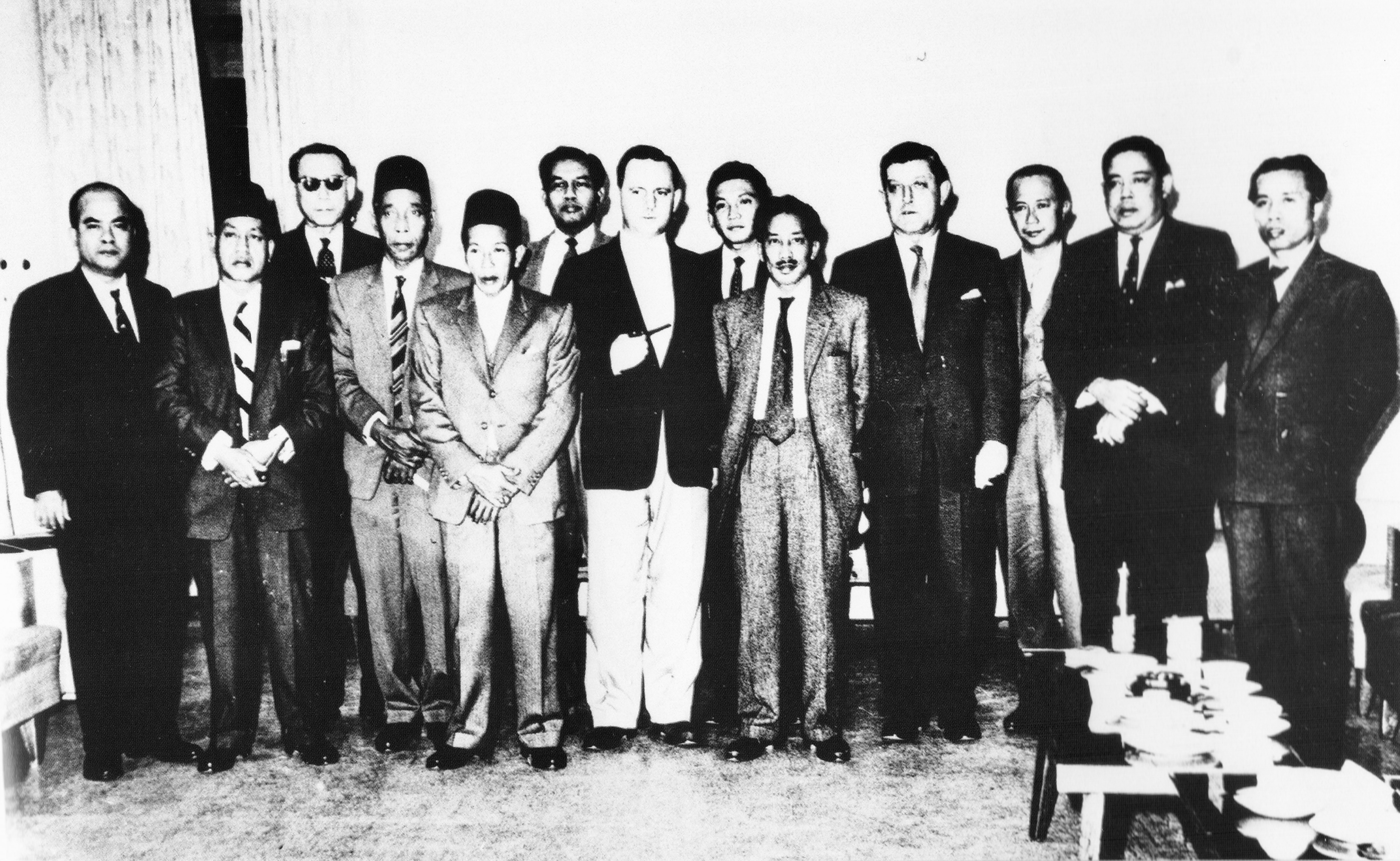

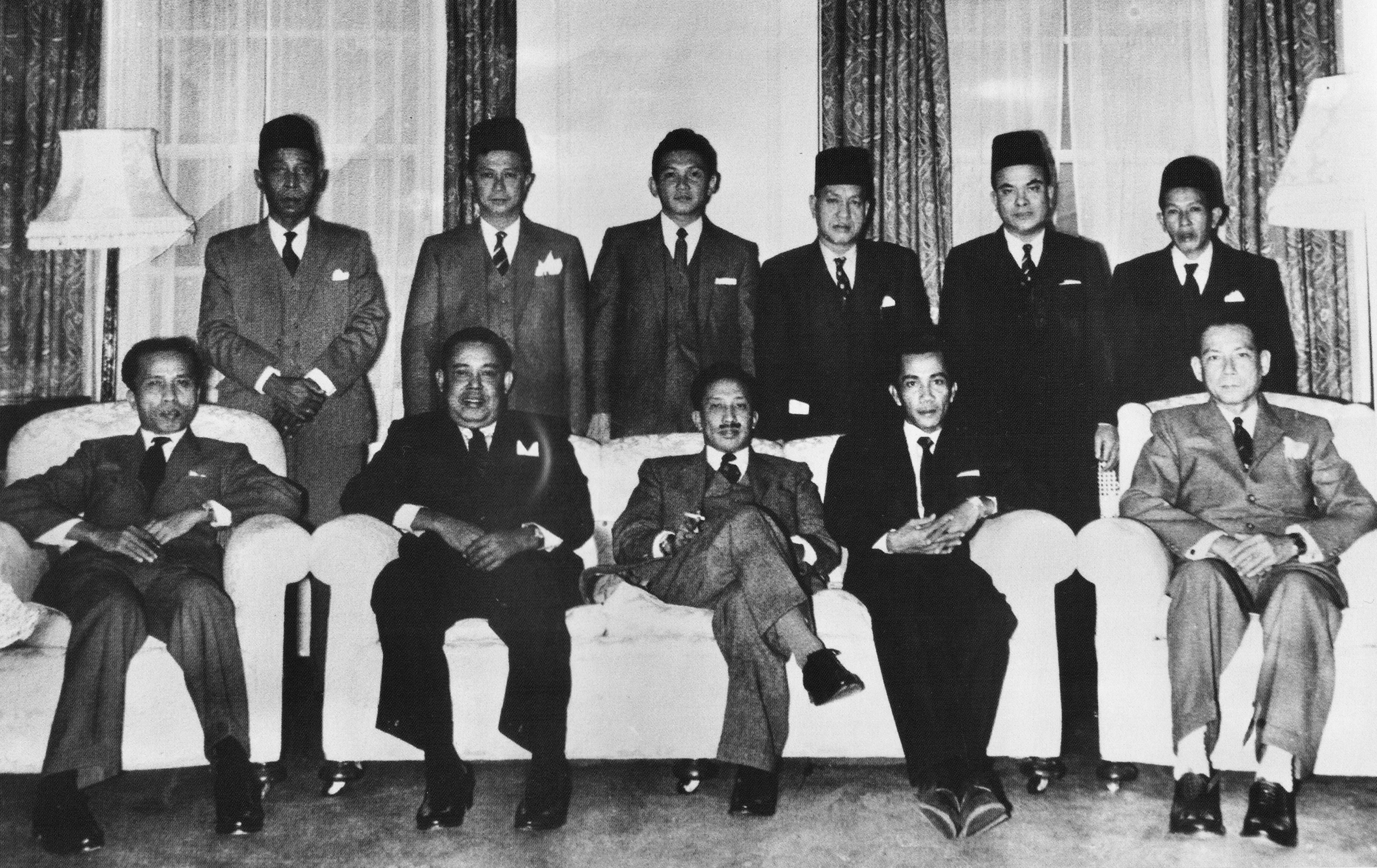
Delegation members of the 1959 Brunei Negotiations

After the Merdeka Talks, British officials focused on resolving Brunei's constitutional issues and called the Sultan to London in early 1959 to finalise the Constitution with the Colonial Secretary. Sultan Omar Ali Saifuddien III led a delegation of 10 individuals to London for constitutional negotiations, departing on 14 March via Singapore. The delegation included key figures such as:

- Pengiran Pemancha Pengiran Anak Haji Mohamed Alam ibni Pengiran Bendahara Pengiran Anak Haji Abdul Rahman
- Pehin Datu Perdana Manteri Dato Laila Utama Haji Ibrahim bin Mohammad Jaafar
- Pehin Orang Kaya Shahbandar Haji Ahmad bin Haji Mohd. Daud
- Pengiran Muhammad Yusuf bin Pengiran Abdul Rahim
- Marsal bin Maun
- Pengiran Mohamed Ali bin Pengiran Haji Mohamed Daud
- Pehin Jawatan Dalam Dato Setia Haji Mohamed Noor bin Pehin Orang Kaya Laksamana Haji Abdul Razak
- Pehin Orang Kaya Laksamana Haji Mohamed Taha bin Pehin Orang Kaya Ratna Diraja Hussain
- Pengiran Haji Abu Bakar Pengiran Pemancha Pengiran Anak Muhammad Salleh II
- Pehin Orang Kaya Sanggamara Seri Diraja Mohd Abbas Al-Sufri bin Pehin Datu Perdana Manteri Dato Laila Utama Haji Ibrahim

These delegates were instrumental in the negotiations that took place between 23 March and 6 April, with the goal of completing Brunei's constitutional framework. Numerous important issues concerning Brunei's future constitution were discussed during negotiations in London in 1959 between the Sultan and Lennox-Boyd for the British. These included council meetings, elections, the appointment of British legal officials and advisers, the functions of the State Secretary and Menteri Besar, chapters on guidance, the authority of the High Commissioner, defence and international affairs, and current agreements.

On 6 April 1959, a first agreement was reached as a result of the negotiations, which was a major step towards Brunei's constitution being implemented. Syair Perlembagaan Negeri Brunei honours this occasion in stanza 294. The result of the agreement that addressed key demands of the 1954 Brunei Constitutional Committee, including the introduction of a Menteri Besar and phased implementation steps starting with his appointment by 1 July.

== Promulgation of the Constitution ==
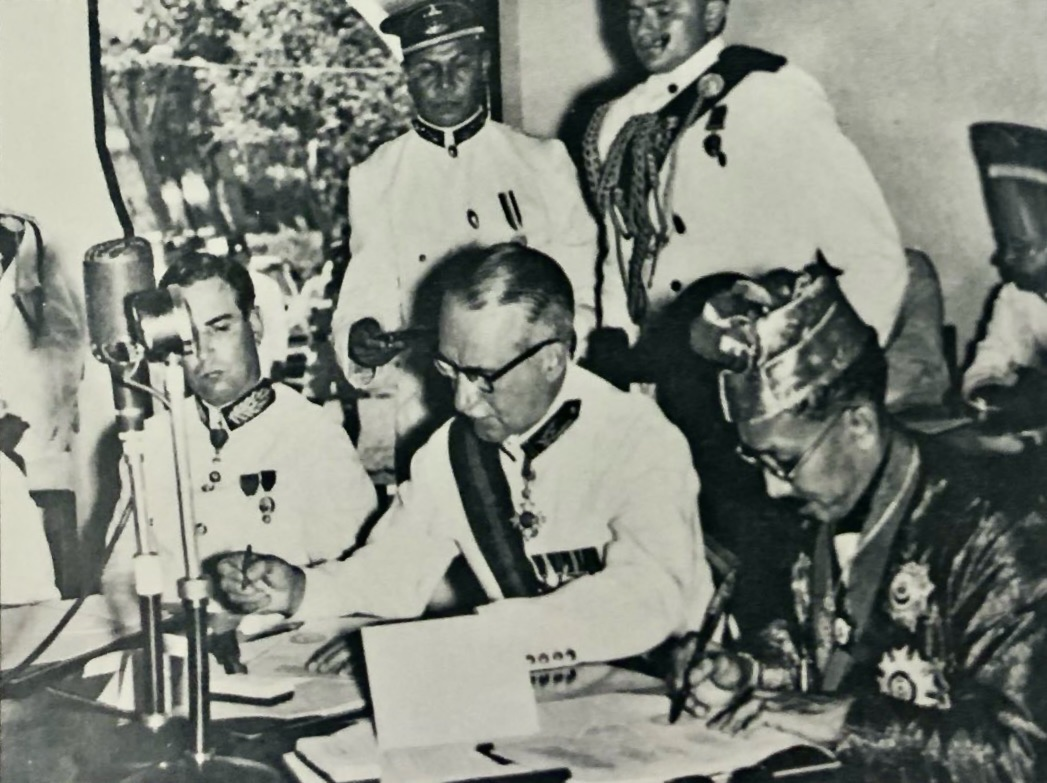
Signing of the 1959 Brunei Agreement and the constitution by Sir Robert Scott and Sultan Omar Ali Saifuddien III, in the presence of Derek Jakeway (left), at Old Lapau

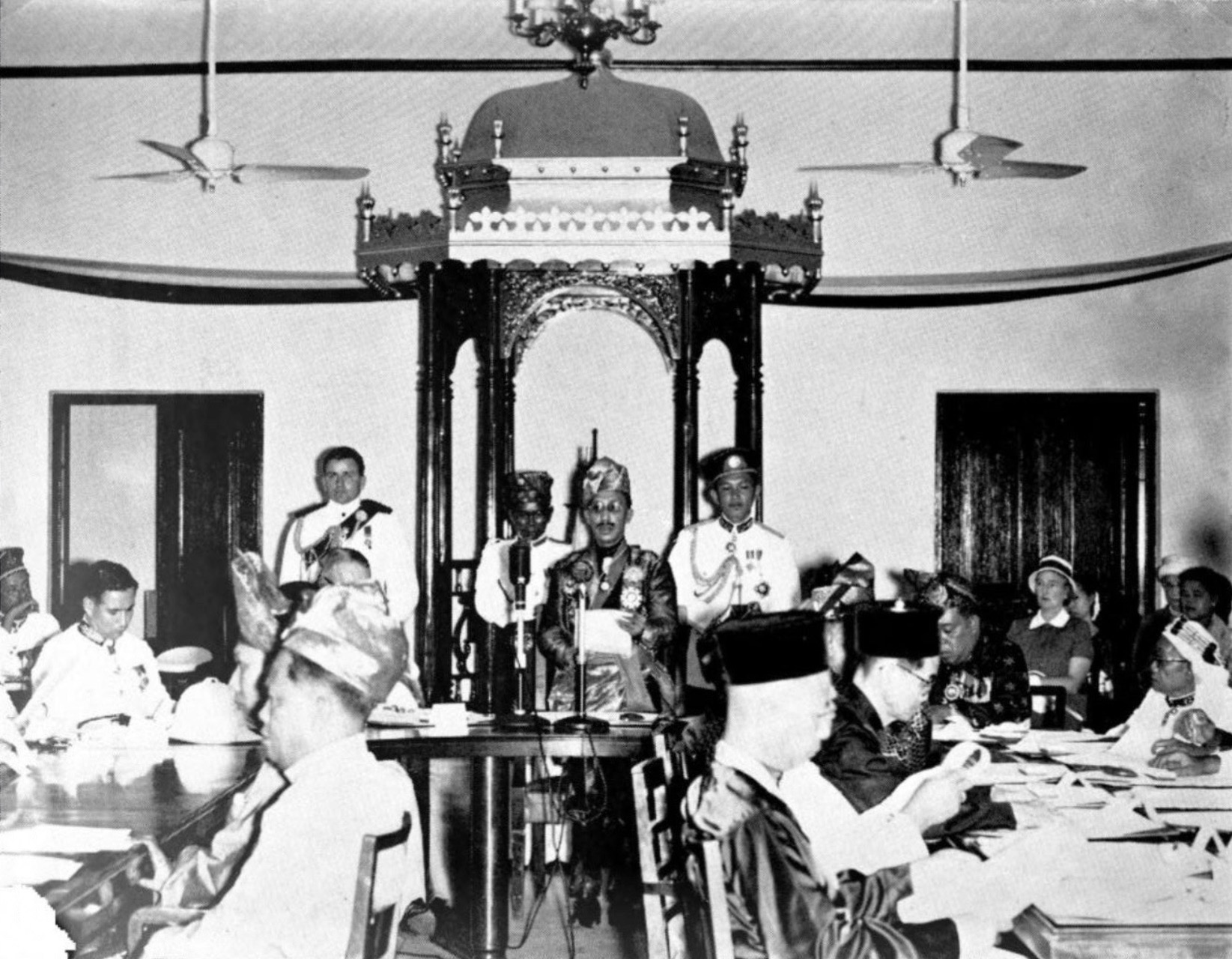
Sultan Omar Ali Saifuddien III giving a titah during the new Brunei Constitution signing ceremony

British officials focused on resolving Brunei's constitutional issues and called the Sultan to London in early 1959 to finalise the Constitution with the Colonial Secretary. Talks from 3 March to 6 April 1959 resulted in an agreement that addressed key demands of the 1954 Brunei Constitutional Committee, including the introduction of a Menteri Besar and phased implementation steps starting with his appointment by 1 July.

After around six years of constitutional negotiations and facing numerous challenges, the governments of Brunei and Britain came to an agreement. Sultan Omar Ali Saifuddien III eventually consented to the ratification of Brunei's first written constitution on 29 September 1959. The signing and proclamation of the 1959 Constitution of Brunei took place on the same day. Following the Sultan's discussion with the Religious Advisor, the date was decided upon. The Constitutional document was signed in Brunei the day before the deadline, which was 30 September, during the consultation in London. In Lapau (present day Old Lapau), Brunei Town, the constitutional document was signed.

On behalf of Brunei, Sultan Omar Ali Saifuddien III had signed the contract. While Sir Robert Scott represented the British Government. Following the signing, the Sultan said that his legislation will be administered in accordance with his orders. Generally speaking, the goal of the 1959 Brunei State Constitution was to replace the British government's 1888 rule over Brunei. Furthermore, it revoked the 1888 and 1905–06 agreements between Brunei and the British. The country took control of the domestic administration and reclaimed its position as a sovereign nation by signing the constitutional documents in 1959.

A new era of turbulent politics in Brunei began to set in with the 1959 Constitution and the amended Brunei-British Treaty. New political players competing for power were presented by the scheduled elections for District Councils and nominations to the Legislative Council. This resulted in a competition between the radical politicians of the PRB, including A. M. Azahari, Salleh Masri, and Abdul Hapidz, and the conservative pengiran "palace party." The Sultan sought to postpone the elections past the two-year period specified by the Constitution, claiming things like the necessity to amend nationality laws, since he thought the PRB may win power.

== Amendments ==
The 1971, 1984, and most recent 2004 amendments to the Constitution are among the significant changes made to it since its inception in 1959. In actuality, all of the revisions made to the Constitution since its adoption in 1959 were included in a newly updated version that was released in 2004.

=== 1971 ===
A draft agreement was the result of discussions in November 1970 between Sultan Hassanal Bolkiah and his entourage and Anthony Royle. A new Anglo-Brunei Agreement modifying the 1959 Agreement was finalised and signed in Bandar Seri Begawan on 23 November 1971, by the Sultan and Anthony Royle, representing the British government, after additional consultations in early 1971. This new Anglo–Brunei Agreement established the Joint Standing Consultative Council for Brunei Defence, also known as the Brunei Defence Council, with members including the High Commissioner and a British officer typically the defence attaché stationed in Brunei. Representation from Brunei on the council was determined by the Sultan.

The Anglo–Brunei Agreement of 1971 stipulated that officials from Brunei and the United Kingdom would counsel their respective governments on topics of security and defence. They would confer with one another to determine how best to respond to outside threats or attacks against Brunei. Brunei would pay for the British government's pledge to keep its Royal Gurkha Rifles battalion in Brunei. Even though the battalion's retention was not part of the 1971 Agreement, Article III (a) stated that Brunei was required to provide facilities for the British Forces Brunei in the country so they might train or exercise with the Sultan's approval, as well as to keep forces to protect internal order and act as the first line of defence.

The British government stopped providing advice on Brunei's internal affairs as part of the 1971 Agreement. Nonetheless, as stated in Article II of the Agreement, it continued to be in charge of Brunei's foreign relations, giving the British monarch the authority to enact laws pertaining to such areas. Significant changes were also made to the High Commissioner's position; from being "Her Majesty's High Commissioner," they became "British High Commissioners," with no advising authority or say in how the state is run. However, they were still eligible to be nominated as a regular member of the Privy Council.

=== 1984 ===
With effect from 1 January 1984, the constitution was revised to include provisions that recognised Brunei's position as a sovereign nation-state that is totally independent. Five councils that the Sultan designates provide guidance and support. The Sultan himself is one of the nine members of the Council of Ministers, or cabinet, which supports the government's operations. In addition to serving as Prime Minister, the Sultan is also the Minister of Defence and the Minister of Finance.

=== 2004 ===
Following the Sultan's speech, a high-level committee was formed to evaluate the Constitution; although its results were not made public, they were submitted in 2000. In his 2004 birthday speech, Sultan Hassanal Bolkiah proposed the constitutional amendments that would fortify the monarchy and enhance governmental-citizen ties through official consultation mechanisms. The 1959 Constitution was substantially modified in 2004 when the number of Legislative Council representatives was increased from 33 to 45, with the Sultan appointing two-thirds of them.

On 16 August 2004, is the start date of the Constitution (Amendment and Suspension) (Amendment) Order, 2004. The suspension of the provisions of Brunei's Constitution's Part VI and VII, which relate to the Legislative Council, will end on the commencement of the order and will no longer be in effect. The 2004 revisions made the 1959 Constitution, which needed the Legislative Council's approval before legislation could be passed, essentially ineffective and granted the Sultan legal immunity from both criminal and civil lawsuits. In addition, the Sultan was granted absolute authority to issue any decree that he saw appropriate in the emergency order.

On 29 September, during the legislature's session at the International Convention Centre, Berakas, the Sultan in his capacity as Head of State, ratified the Constitution of Brunei Darussalam (Amendment) Proclamation. This makes it possible for the Legislative Council to be reestablished. According to Hazair Abdullah on 30 September 2004, the Constitution Amendments and the Legislative Council's resurrection would inspire and drive the nation's public service to reach new heights of performance and efficiency. The legislative process was prioritised as a way for the people to participate in the growth of the state, even if the number of participants was restricted. It was portrayed as an official venue for discussing problems and voicing opinions.
