= Mukim Sungai Kedayan =

Mukim of Brunei

Coordinates: 4.8888°N 114.9374°E

- Mukim
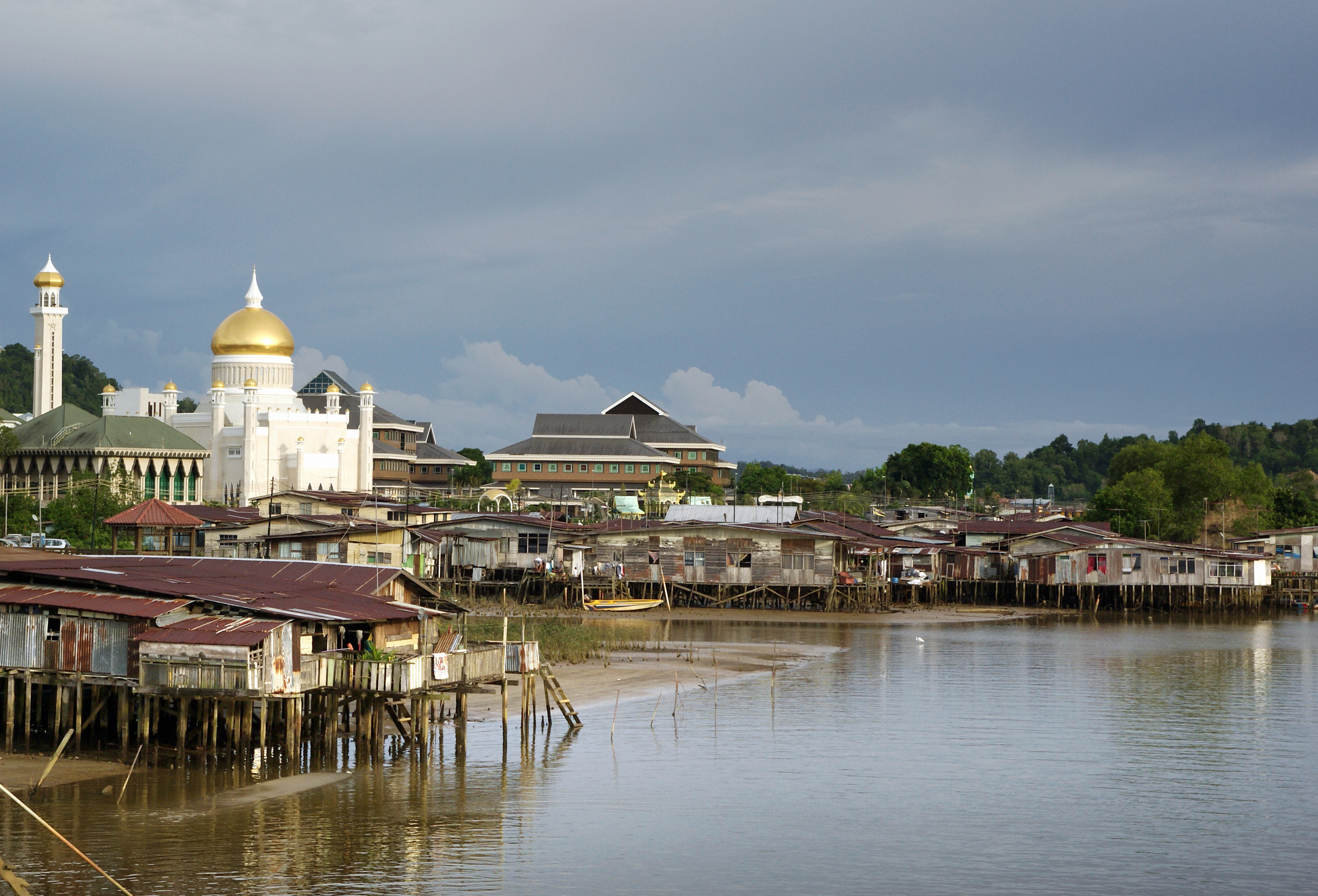
- Settlements in Mukim Sungai Kedayan before the urban redevelopment project

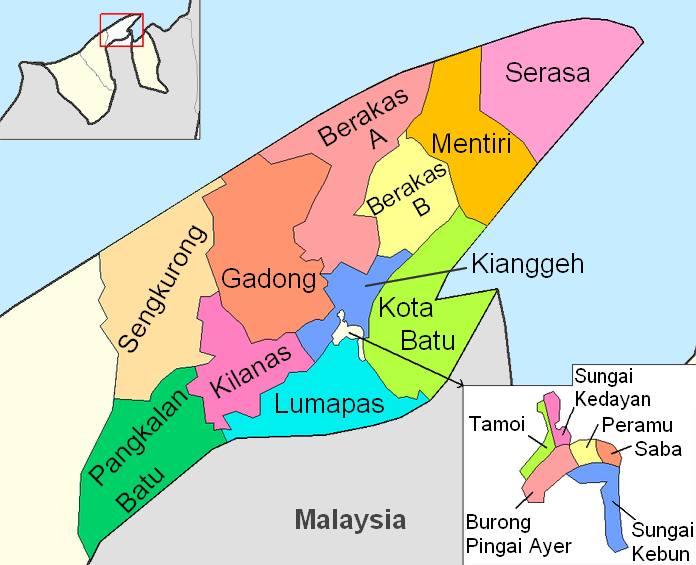
- Sungai Kedayan is in pink.
- Country: Brunei
- District: Brunei-Muara

Government
  - Penghulu: Raimi Rashid (Acting)

Population (2021)
  - Total: 241
- Time zone: UTC+8 (BNT)
- Postcode: BNxx11

Mukim Sungai Kedayan was a mukim in Brunei-Muara District, Brunei. It was located within Kampong Ayer, the historical stilt settlements on the Brunei River in the capital Bandar Seri Begawan. The population was 230 in 2016.

== Etymology ==
The name of the mukim could be named after the village it formerly encompasses, Kampong Sungai Kedayan. The wealthy traders used to reside in Kampong Sungai Kedayan, and the majority of senior government officials came from there.

== History ==
Kampong Ujong Bukit and Kampong Sungai Kedayan, which is also referred to as Kampong Pandai Emas, are the first communities with expertise in Bruneian native copper companies. As per the folklore, Kampong Pandai Emas is where Brunei's gold industry originated, whereas Kampong Ujong Bukit is where silver and copper originated.

At the time of its completion in early 1970, the File Bridge brought great ease and enjoyment to the people living in Kampong Ayer. The boundary between Kampong Ujong Tanjung and Kampong Sungai Kedayan is indicated by this bridge. Kampong Tamoi Ujong, which faces the bank of Kampong Bakut China, and Kampong Pengiran Pemancha Lama are two of the settlements that may be crossed over the bridge. Kampong Sungai Kebun as per the oral tradition of the ancients, this village marked the commencement of henna tree farming history. At that time, Kampong Ayer residents purchased becca leaves for use in wedding rituals. The Bepacar custom is one of the traditions and customs (applied to the bride and groom) of the Kampong Ayer community during that period.

Notices listing the villages to be demolished were published in the beginning of 2014, and within a few months, demolition work on the villages started in phases, beginning with Kampong Sumbiling Lama, Kampong Bukit Salat, Kampong Sungai Kedayan, and Kampong Ujong Tanjong. Every home in the villages on the list had been demolished by the end of 2014.

== Demographics ==
As of 2016 census, the population was 230 with 59.1% males and 40.9% females. The mukim had 74 households occupying 73 dwellings. The entire population lived in urban areas.

== Administration ==
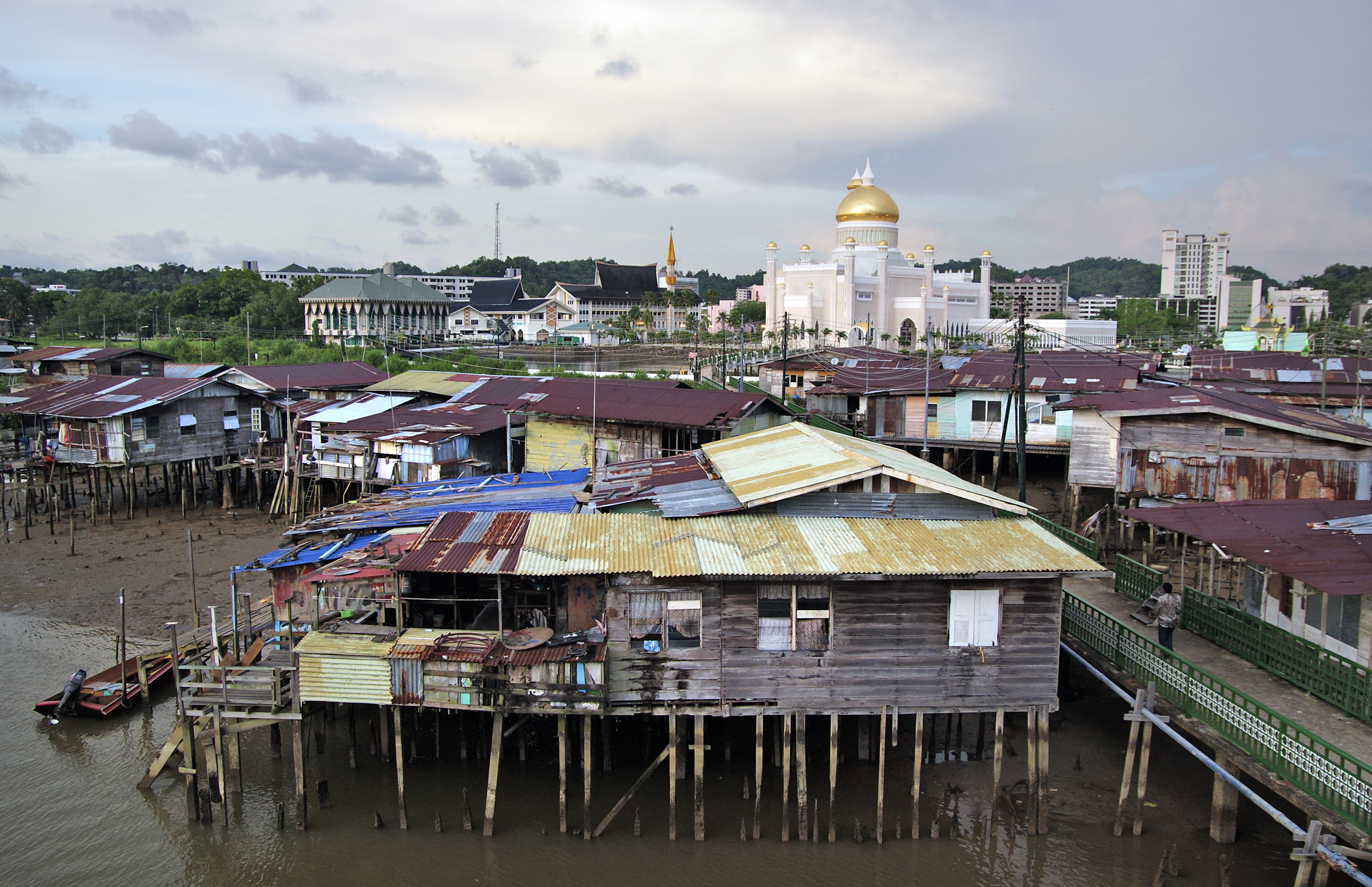
Kampong Sungai Kedayan in 2009

Majority of the villages in the mukim no longer exists; as of 2016, the only populated village is Kampong Sumbiling Lama. This is due to an urban regeneration project undertaken by the government in mid-2010s which involved redeveloping parts of the river banks of Kedayan River adjacent to the city centre into an urban park (now known as Taman Mahkota Jubli Emas). The area had been occupied by the aforementioned villages, hence to make way for the project the residents had been relocated. As of 2021, the mukim consists of the following villages:

Settlements	Population (2021)	Ketua kampung (2024)
Kampong Sumbiling Lama	241	Haji Mayalin bin Haji Saat
Kampong Ujong Tanjong	0	—N/a
Kampong Sungai Kedayan 'A'	0	—N/a
Kampong Sungai Kedayan 'B'	0	—N/a
Kampong Bukit Salat	0	—N/a

== Places of interest ==
- Istana Darussalam (Darussalam Palace) former official residence of the Sultan of Brunei, Omar Ali Saifuddien III, before its relocation to Istana Darul Hana.
- Taman Mahkota Jubli Emas (Golden Jubilee Crown Park) is a recreational park by the river, officially opened in conjunction with the Golden Jubilee of the Sultan of Brunei.
