= Pengiran Anak Besar =

Bruneian nobility (1928–2016)

Pengiran Anak Besar ڤڠيرن انق بسر
- Pengiran Babu Raja
- Pengiran Anak Besar in 2015
- Born: Besar binti Metassan; 24 September 1928; Brunei
- Died: 16 October 2016 (aged 88); Raja Isteri Pengiran Anak Saleha Hospital, Bandar Seri Begawan, Brunei
- Burial: Royal Mausoleum, Bandar Seri Begawan, Brunei
- Spouse: Mohamed Alam bin Abdul Rahman (m. 1943; died 1982)
- Issue: List: Yusof; Saleha; Zariah; Puteh; Ja'afar; Rokiah; Damit; Mastura; Fatimah
- House: Bolkiah
- Father: Metassan bin Ismail Apong
- Mother: Piut binti Muhammad Tajuddin Gador
- Religion: Sunni Islam

Besar binti Metassan (24 September 1928 – 16 October 2016) was a member of the Bruneian royal family and the mother of Queen Saleha, the queen consort of Sultan Hassanal Bolkiah.

== Early life ==
Besar was born on 24 September 1928 to Pengiran Anak Metassan bin Pengiran Anak Ismail Apong and Pengiran Anak Piut binti Pengiran Anak Muhammad Tajuddin Gador.

== Marriage and issue ==
In 1943, Besar married Pengiran Pemancha Pengiran Anak Mohamed Alam ibni Pengiran Bandahara Pengiran Anak Abdul Rahman. Together they had nine children, 37 grandchildren, and 29 great-grandchildren as of 2016.

=== Issue ===
- Pengiran Anak Mohammad Yusof (24 June 1948 – 13 December 2004); married Princess Nor'ain and had issue
- Pengiran Anak Saleha (born 7 October 1946); married Sultan Hassanal Bolkiah and has issue
- Pengiran Anak Zariah (3 October 1947 – 6 October 2026); married Prince Mohamed Bolkiah and has issue
- Pengiran Anak Rokiah (born 17 July 1950); married Pengiran Anak Apong bin Pengiran Bendahara Pengiran Muda Hashim
- Pangiran Anak Puteh (born 19 January 1951); married Kamilah binti Abdullah and has issue
- Pengiran Anak Ja'afar (born 1951)
- Pengiran Anak Damit (6 May 1956 – 19 August 2007); married Pengiran Muhammad Ayub bin Pengiran Maharaja Anakanda Pengiran Ahmad
- Pengiran Anak Mastura (6 January 1960 – 26 July 2016); married Pengiran Yura Perkasa bin Pengiran Setia Negara Pengiran Mohd. Yussof and had issue
- Pengiran Anak Fatimah (born 9 April 1962)

== Royal duties ==
Besar was active in community and welfare initiatives in Brunei. She would also attend several other royal ceremonies and events, such as a Khatam al-Quran ceremony in 2008 and the Hari Raya Aidilfitri open house at the Bukit Kayangan Hall in 2014

== Death ==
Besar died on 16 October 2016 at Raja Isteri Pengiran Anak Saleha Hospital at the age of 88. Her remains were taken to her home in Taman Seri Alam, Beribi, Bandar Seri Begawan before being interred at the Royal Mausoleum. Members of the royal family and government officials attended the ceremony.

== Titles, styles, and honours ==
Styles of Pengiran Anak Besar
- Reference style: Yang Teramat Mulia
- Alternative style: Her Royal Highness

=== Titles and styles ===
Sultan Hassanal Bolkiah granted her the title of Pengiran Babu Raja which translates to Queen mother.

- Yang Amat Mulia Pengiran Anak Besar binti Pengiran Anak Metassan
- Yang Teramat Mulia Pengiran Babu Raja Pengiran Anak Besar binti Pengiran Anak Metassan

=== Honours ===
- Family Order of Laila Utama (DK) – Dato Laila Utama
- Order of Paduka Seri Laila Jasa Second Class (DSLJ) – Datin Seri Laila Jasa
- Sultan Hassanal Bolkiah Medal (PHBS)

=== Things named after her ===
- Jalan Pengiran Babu Raja, a road in Bandar Seri Begawan
