= Pengiran Anak Mohammad Yusof =

Bruneian prince (1948–2004)

Mohd. Yusof محمد يوسف
- Pengiran Maharaja Lela Sahibul Kahar
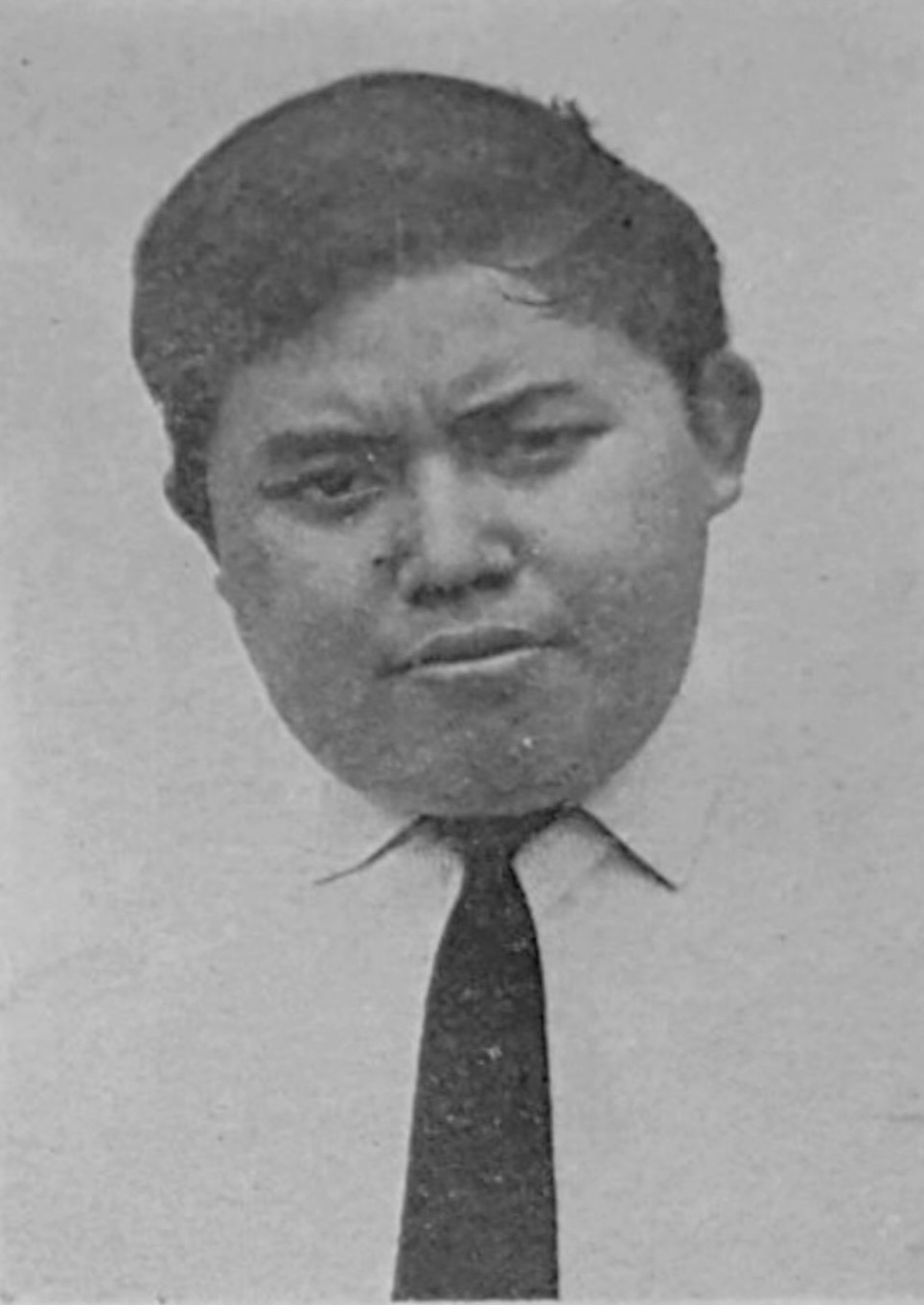
- Yusof in 1967

Chief of Adat Istiadat Negara
- In office 1 December 1981 – 31 March 2000
- Monarch: Hassanal Bolkiah
- Preceded by: Mohamed Alam bin Abdul Rahman
- Succeeded by: Abdul Aziz bin Abu Bakar
- Born: 24 June 1948; Kampong Sumbiling Lama, Brunei Town, Brunei
- Died: 13 December 2004 (aged 56); Kampong Telanai, Bandar Seri Begawan, Brunei
- Burial: Royal Mausoleum, Bandar Seri Begawan, Brunei
- Spouse: Princess Nor'ain (m. 1967)
- Issue: List: Abdul Hadi Bolkiah; Abdul Jabbar; Abdul Kadir; Hurma Raiha'anatul Bolkiah; Siti Radhiah; Siti Khadija; Wahidah Widadul Bolkiah; Hafiyyah
- House: Bolkiah
- Father: Mohamed Alam bin Abdul Rahman
- Mother: Besar binti Metassan
- Religion: Sunni Islam

Mohammad Yusof bin Mohamed Alam (24 June 1948 – 13 December 2004) was a member of the Bruneian royal family. He was the brother of Queen Saleha and the husband of Princess Nor'ain. Yusof was also a civil servant who served as the Chief of Jabatan Adat Istiadat Negara, or Department of State Customs, and was a member of several state councils.

== Early life ==
Mohammad Yusof was born on 24 June 1948 in Kampong Sumbiling Lama, Brunei Town to Pengiran Anak Mohamed Alam bin Pengiran Anak Abdul Rahman and Pengiran Anak Besar binti Pengiran Anak Metassan.

== Education ==
Yusof began his education at the school set up for royal children at Istana Darul Hana. He then attended Gurney English School in Kuala Lumpur, Sultan Omar Ali Saifuddien College in Bandar Seri Begawan, and Victoria Institution in Kuala Lumpur. He continued his education at Stafford House Tutorial College in London.

== Marriage and issue ==
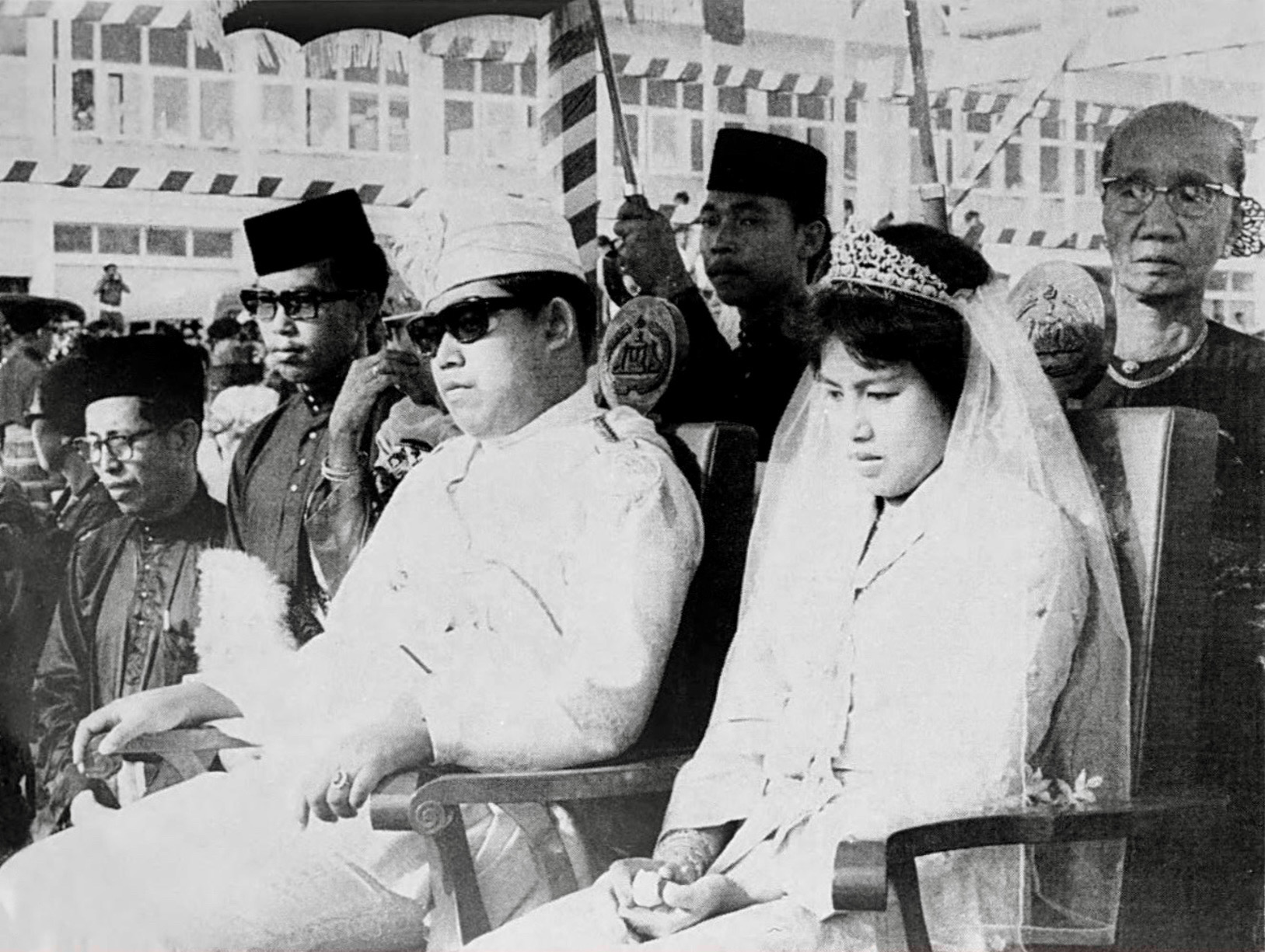
Wedding parade of Yusof and Nor'ain in 1967

In August 1967, Yusof married Princess Nor'ain in a two week long celebration.

Yusof's father, Pengiran Anak Mohamed Alam, and Nor'ain's mother, Queen Damit, were siblings making them first cousins. Two of his siblings also married the siblings of his wife. His sister, Queen Saleha married Sultan Hassanal Bolkiah in 1965 and his sister, Zariah, married Prince Mohamed in 1970.

Yusof and Nor'ain had eight children all of whom have the style of Yang Amat Mulia and the title of Pengiran Anak.

- Abdul Hadi Bolkiah (born 8 April 1972)
- Abdul Jabbar (born 4 February 1974)
- Abdul Kadir (born 16 January 1976); married Norashikin binti Johari
- Hurma Raiha'anatul Bolkiah (born 12 February 1978)
- Siti Radhiah (born 27 June 1980); married Pengiran Mohammad Ezul Hazrin bin Pengiran Zohaini
- Siti Khadija (born 9 September 1981)
- Wahidah Widadul Bolkiah (born 23 August 1982)
- Hafiyyah (born 22 October 1989); married Pengiran Muhammad Aizat bin Pengiran Yasmin

== Career ==
In July 1968, he became a member of the Cheteria after which he was responsible for managing and observing royal ceremonies in order to ensure its accordance to tradition and customs.

From April 1970 to August 1971, Yusof served as the Deputy Controller of the Department of Immigration and National Registration. He was then appointed as the Deputy Chairman of the National Customs and Excise Department before being promoted to Chairman on 1 December 1981. He retired as the chairman on 30 March 2000.

In 1971, Yusof became a member of the Jabatan Adat Istiadat Negara or Department of State Customs. On 1 December 1981, he was appointed as the Chief (Yang Di-Pertua) of the department. He retired on 31 March 2000.

Mohammad Yusof also served on the Privy Council, Syariah Council, and Succession Council.

== Death ==
On 13 December 2004, Yusof died at his home in Kampong Telanai. Abdul Aziz Juned alongside members of the royal family carried out the prayers at his home. His body was brought to and buried at the Royal Mausoleum.

== Titles, styles, and honours ==
Styles of Mohd. Yusof bin Mohd. Alam
- Reference style: Yang Amat Mulia
- Alternative style: His Highness

=== Titles and styles ===
In 1968, Yusof was granted the Cheteria title of Pengiran Maharaja Lela Sahibul Kahar

- 24 June 1948 - 26 July 1968: Yang Amat Mulia Pengiran Anak Mohammad Yusof bin Pengiran Anak Mohamed Alam
- 26 July 1968 - 13 December 2004: Yang Amat Mulia Pengiran Maharaja Lela Sahibul Kahar Pengiran Anak Mohammad Yusof bin Pengiran Anak Mohamed Alam

=== Honours ===
Personal standard of Pengiran Maharaja Lela Sahibul Kahar

=== National ===
- Family Order of Laila Utama (DK; 1 January 1972) – Dato Laila Utama
- Family Order of Seri Utama (DK; 15 July 1970) – Dato Seri Utama
- Order of Setia Negara Brunei Third Class (SNB; 1969)
- Sultan Hassanal Bolkiah Medal (PHBS; 15 July 1971)
- Pingat Bakti Laila Ikhlas (PBLI; 15 February 1999)
- Meritorious Service Medal (PJK; 24 February 1987)
- Long Service Medal (PKL; 18 February 1993)
- Proclamation of Independence Medal (1997)
- Coronation Medal (1 August 1968)
- Sultan of Brunei Silver Jubilee Medal (5 October 1992)

=== Foreign ===
- Egypt:
  - Grand Cordon of the Order of the Nile (17 December 1984)
- Selangor:
  - Sultan Salahuddin Silver Jubilee Medal (3 September 1985)

Political offices
Preceded by Pengiran Anak Mohamed Alam	Chief of Adat Istiadat Negara; 1 December 1981 – 31 March 2000	Succeeded by Pengiran Anak Abdul Aziz
