= Princess Nor'ain of Brunei =

Bruneian princess (born 1950)

Princess Nor'ain
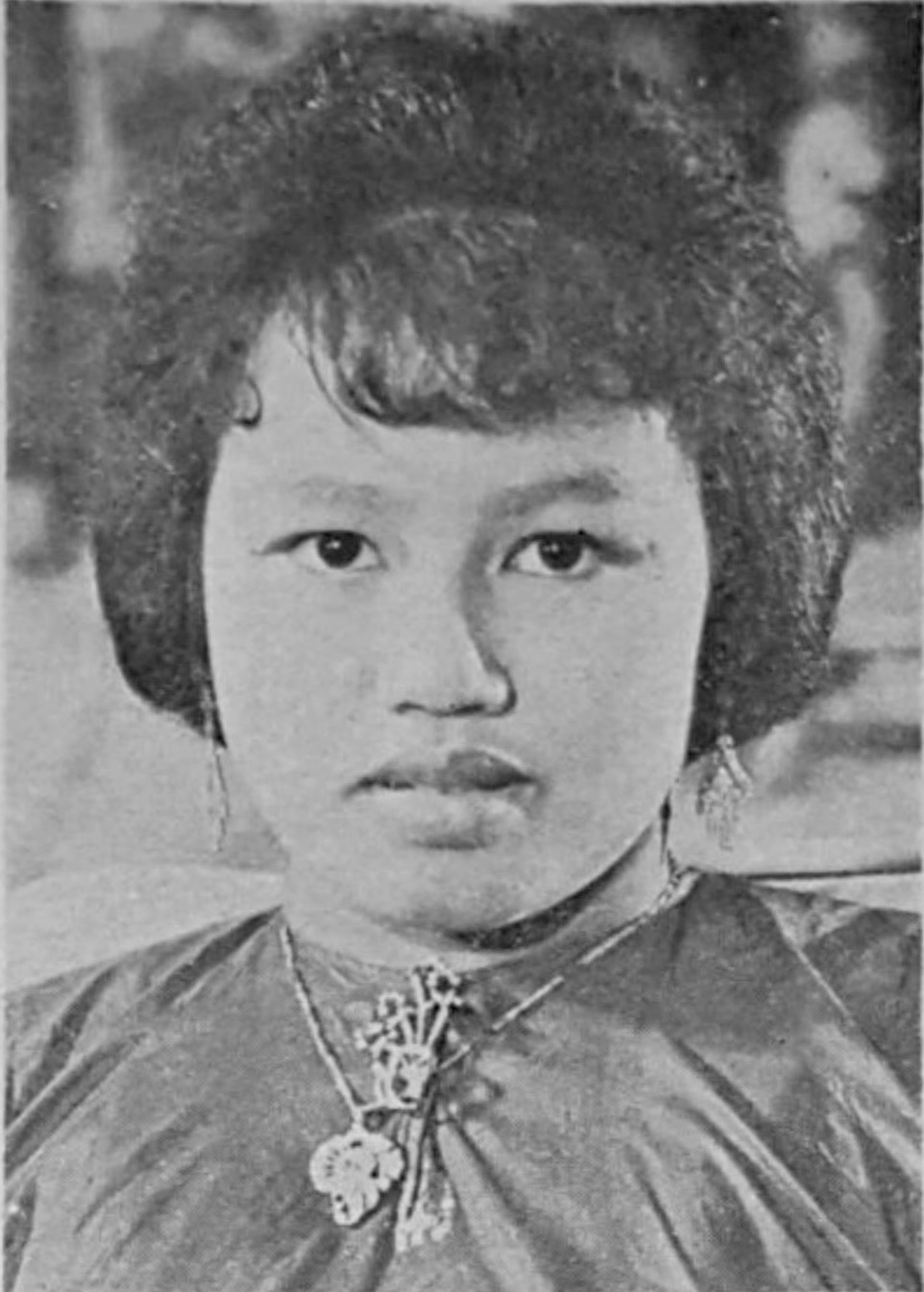
- Nor'ain in 1967
- Born: Nor'ain binti Omar Ali Saifuddien; 19 May 1950 (age 76); Istana Darussalam, Brunei Town, British Protectorate of Brunei
- Spouse: Mohd. Yusof Mohd. Alam (m. 1967)
- Issue: Abdul Hadi Bolkiah; Abdul Jabbar; Abdul Kadir; Hurma Raiha'anatul Bolkiah; Siti Radhiah; Siti Khadija; Wahidah Widadul Bolkiah; Hafiyyah
- House: Bolkiah
- Father: Omar Ali Saifuddien III
- Mother: Damit binti Abdul Rahman
- Religion: Sunni Islam

Nor'ain binti Omar Ali Saifuddien III (born 19 May 1950) is a member of the royal family of Brunei. She is the daughter of Sultan Omar Ali Saifuddien III and the sister of Sultan Hassanal Bolkiah.

== Early life ==
Princess Nor'ain was born on 19 May 1950 at Istana Darussalam to Sultan Omar Ali Saifuddien III and Queen Damit. She has nine siblings including Hassanal Bolkiah.

== Education ==
Nor'ain began her education privately at the school set up for the royal family at Istana Darul Hana. She later attended the Raja Isteri Girls' High School and then continued her education in England.

== Marriage and issue ==
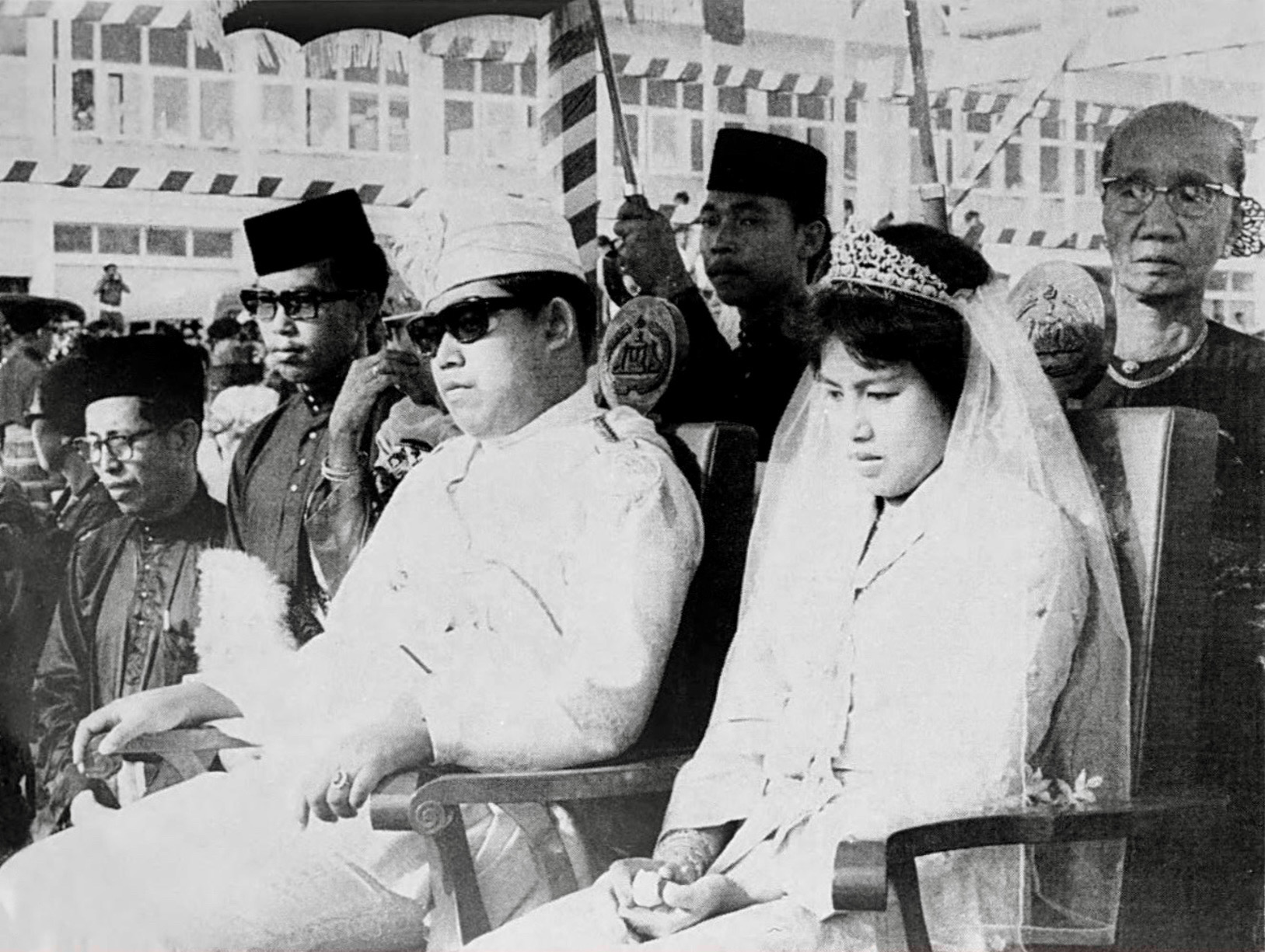
Wedding parade of Nor'ain and Yusof in 1967

In August 1967, Princess Nor'ain married Pengiran Anak Mohammad Yusof bin Pengiran Anak Mohamed Alam in a two week long celebration.

Nor'ain's mother, Queen Damit, and Yusof's father, Pengiran Anak Mohamed Alam, were siblings making them first cousins. Two of her siblings also married the siblings of her husband. Her brother, Hassanal Bolkiah, married Queen Saleha of Brunei in 1965 and her sister, Zariah, married Prince Mohamed Bolkiah in 1970.

Nor'ain and Yusof had eight children all of whom have the style of Yang Amat Mulia and the title of Pengiran Anak.

- Abdul Hadi Bolkiah (born 8 April 1972)
- Abdul Jabbar (born 4 February 1974)
- Abdul Kadir (born 16 January 1976); married Norashikin binti Johari
- Hurma Raiha'anatul Bolkiah (born 12 February 1978)
- Siti Radhiah (born 27 June 1980); married Pengiran Mohammad Ezul Hazrin bin Pengiran Zohaini
- Siti Khadija (born 9 September 1981)
- Wahidah Widadul Bolkiah (born 23 August 1982)
- Hafiyyah (born 22 October 1989); married Pengiran Muhammad Aizat bin Pengiran Yasmin

== Royal duties ==
In 1975, Princess Nor'ain became the Deputy Commandant of the new Women's Police Unit of the Royal Brunei Police Force. In October 2008, she presented prizes to the RBPF's Inter Women Branch Shooting Competition and in February 2017 she attended the opening of the new RBPF headquarters.

== Titles, styles, and honours ==
Styles of Princess Nor'ain
- Reference style: Yang Teramat Mulia
- Alternative style: Her Royal Highness

=== Titles and styles ===
Her full title and style is Yang Teramat Mulia Paduka Seri Pengiran Anak Puteri Nor'ain binti Omar Ali Saifuddien Sa'adul Khairi Waddien It is usually translated in English as Her Royal Highness Princess Nor'ain of Brunei.

=== Honours ===
- Royal Family Order of the Crown of Brunei (DKMB)
- Family Order of Laila Utama (DK; 28 October 1970)
- Sultan Hassanal Bolkiah Medal (PHBS; 1 August 1968)
- Proclamation of Independence Medal (1 January 1984)
- Sultan of Brunei Silver Jubilee Medal (5 October 1992)
- Sultan of Brunei Golden Jubilee Medal (5 October 2017)
