= Family Order of Laila Utama =

Honor of the Sultanate of Brunei

Awarded by the Sultan of Brunei
- Type: Order of chivalry
- Established: 1954
- Country: Brunei
- Eligibility: Members of the Brunei royal family, foreign dignitaries, and other distinguished individuals
- Status: Currently constituted
- Sovereign: Hassanal Bolkiah

Precedence
- Next (higher): Royal Family Order of the Crown of Brunei
- Next (lower): Family Order of Seri Utama

The Most Esteemed Family Order of Laila Utama (Malay: Darjah Kerabat Laila Utama Yang Amat Dihormati) is the highest order of Brunei. It was established on 1 March 1954 by Sultan Omar Ali Saifuddien III. The order carries the post-nominal letters "DK I" as well as the title "Dato Laila Utama".

== Description ==
Before 1975, Sultan Omar Ali Saifuddien III painted bust was the centerpiece of the order's design. Then a star and crescent moon took the place of the bust. All of the emblems are made of gold or silver with enamel accents. The post-nominal letters "DK I" are associated with the order. The right to use the title "Dato Laila Utama" is included in the order.

== Recipients ==
Awards were given to members of the Royal Family, princes from other countries, chiefs of state, and other deserving individuals.

=== Ordinary recipients ===
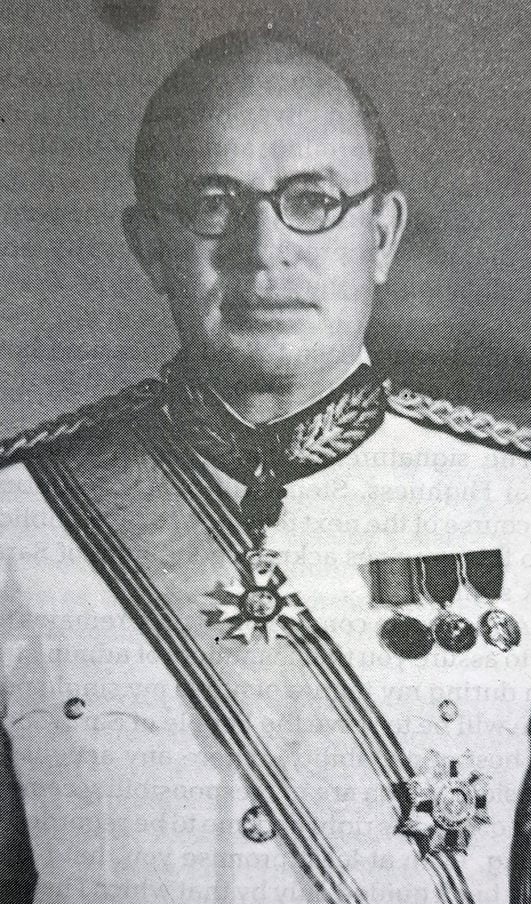
Abell wearing his sash in the 1950s

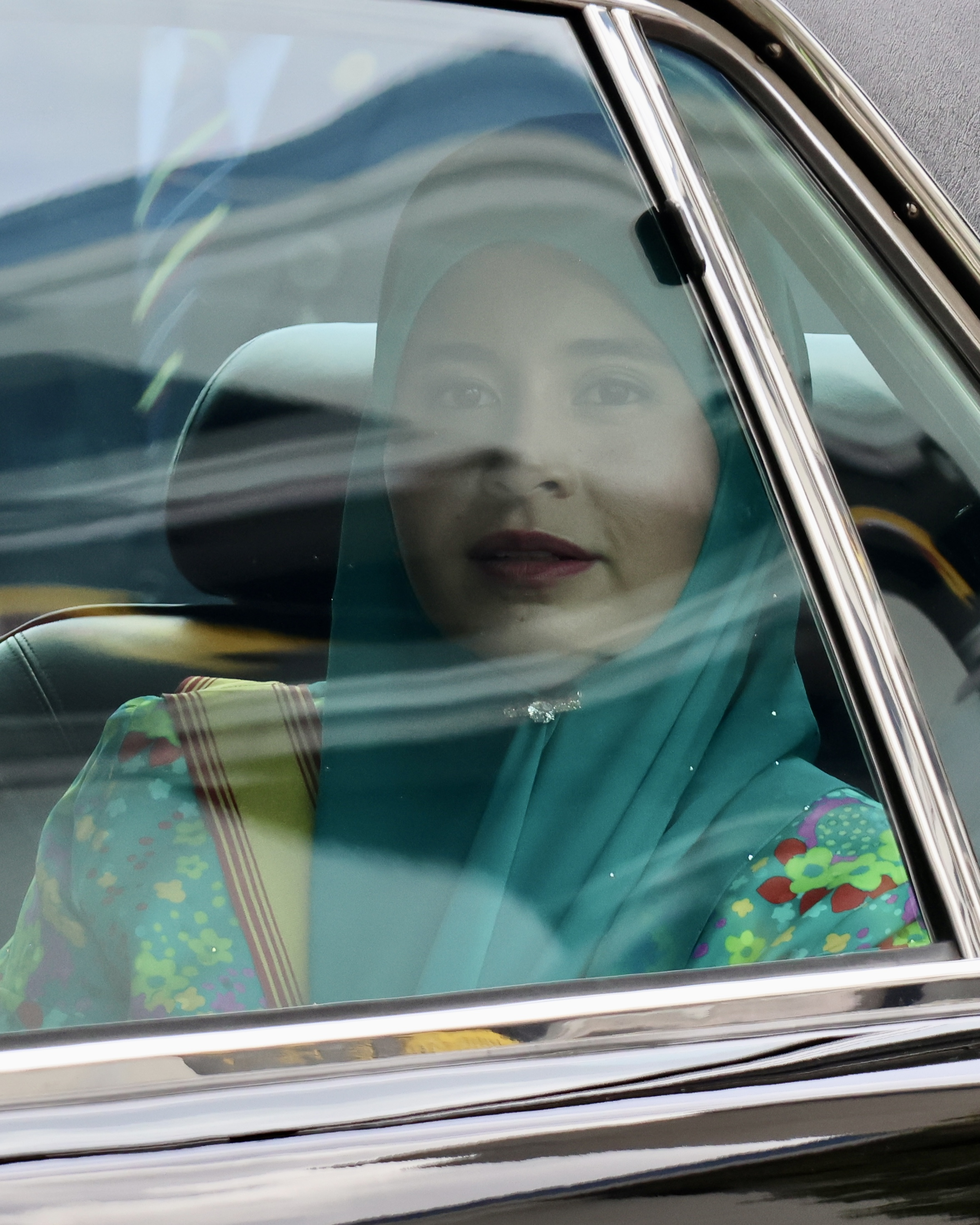
Crown Princess Sarah wearing her sash in 2024

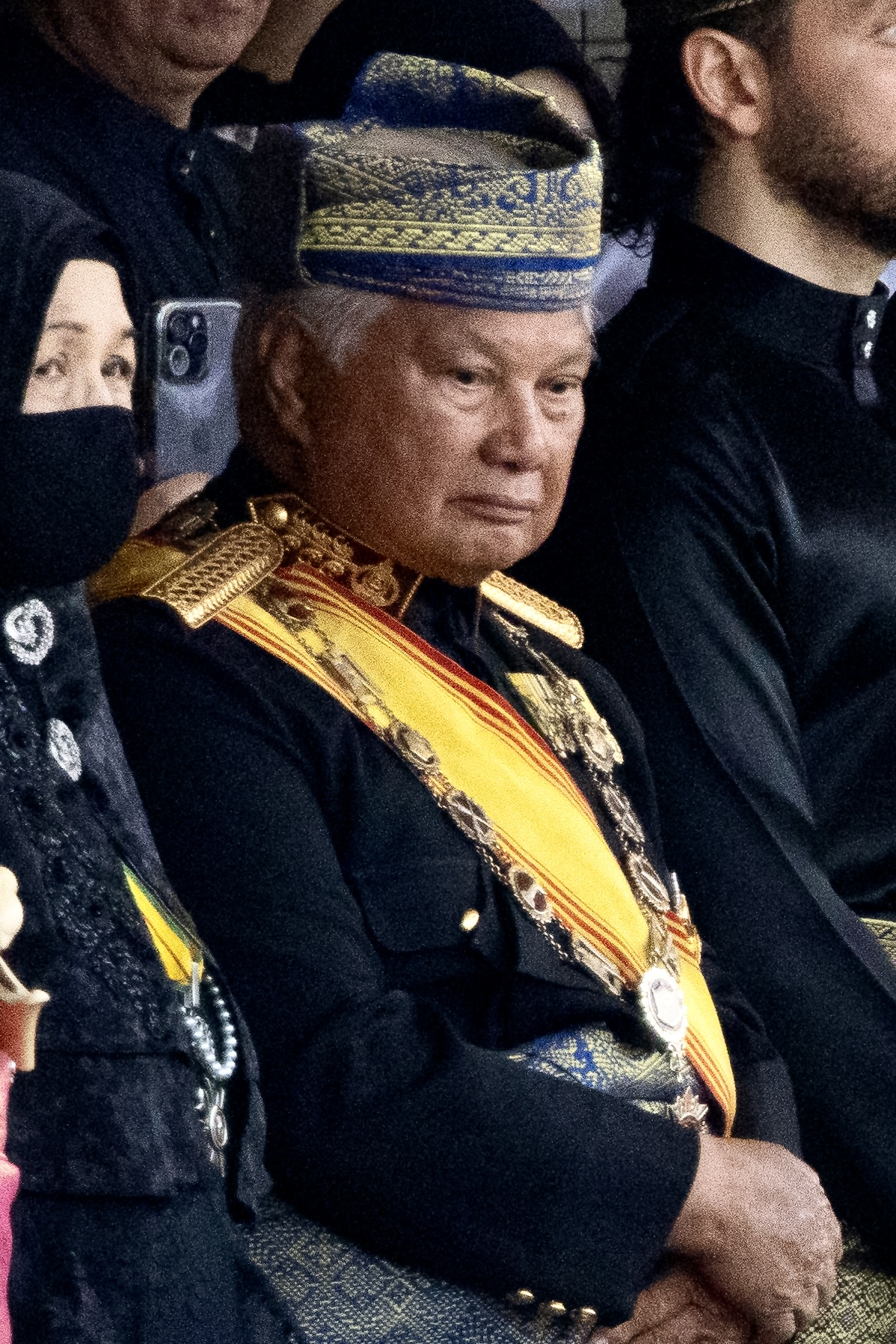
Pengiran Bahrin wearing his sash in 2024

- 1954: Sultan Omar Ali Saifuddien III
- 1954: Pengiran Anak Damit
- 1954: Sultan Hassanal Bolkiah
- 1954: Prince Mohamed Bolkiah
- 1954: Anthony Abell
- 1967: Pengiran Muhammad Salleh
- 1967: Pengiran Muda Hashim
- 1967: Pengiran Anak Mohamed Alam
- 1968: Pengiran Muhammad Yusuf
- 1968: Pengiran Mohammed Abdul Rahman Piut
- 1968: Pengiran Anak Khamis
- 1970: Prince Sufri Bolkiah
- 1970: Prince Jefri Bolkiah
- 1970: Princess Masna
- 1970: Princess Nor'ain
- 1970: Pengiran Anak Saleha
- 1970: Yusof Husain
- 1972: Pengiran Anak Zariah
- 1972: Isa Ibrahim
- 1972: Abbas Al-Sufri
- 1972: Pengiran Anak Mohammad Yusof
- 1972: Pengiran Anak Besar
- 1972: Pengiran Anak Abdul Aziz
- 1972: Pengiran Abdul Momin
- 1972: Pengiran Abdul Momin Ismail
- 1972: Pengiran Mokhtar Puteh
- 1972: Abdul Rahman Taha
- 1985: Pengiran Anak Muhammad Bey Muntassir
- 1990: Mazuin Hamzah
- 2005: Sarah, Crown Princess of Brunei
- 2010: Pengiran Faizah
- Princess Nor Ehsani
- Pengiran Anak Abdul Rahim
- Pengiran Anak Idris
- Pengiran Bahrin
- Pengiran Norhayati

=== Honorary recipients ===
- 1957: Tuanku Abdul Rahman, Yang di-Pertuan Agong of Malaysia
- 1958: Hisamuddin, Sultan of Selangor
- 1958: Abu Bakar, Sultan of Pahang
- 1958: Putra, Raja of Perlis
- 1958: Ibrahim, Sultan of Kelantan
- 1958: Ismail, Crown Prince of Johor
- 1959: Tunku Abdul Rahman, Prime Minister of Malaysia
- 1960: Yusof Ishak, Yang di-Pertuan Negara of Singapore (later President)
- 1961: Yahya Petra, Sultan of Kelantan
- 1968: Tuanku Ja’afar, Yang di-Pertuan Besar of Negeri Sembilan
- 1972: Elizabeth II, Queen of the United Kingdom
- 1972: Prince Philip, Duke of Edinburgh
- 1972: Peter Gautrey, British High Commissioner to Brunei
- 1972: Iskandar, Sultan of Johor
- 1980: Ahmad Shah, Sultan of Pahang
- 1984: Noor, Queen Consort of Jordan
- 1987: Zanariah, Raja Permaisuri Agong of Malaysia
- 1988: Fidel V. Ramos, President of the Philippines
- 1988: Suharto, President of Indonesia
- 1988: Siti Hartinah, First Lady of Indonesia
- 1990: Sirikit, Queen Consort of Thailand
- 1990: Sirindhorn, Princess of Thailand
- 1990: Lee Kuan Yew, Prime Minister of Singapore
- 1990: Sir Ti-Liang Yang, Chief Justice of the Supreme Court of Hong Kong
- 1996: Charles III, King of the United Kingdom, as Prince of Wales
- 1997: Tun Dr. Mahathir Mohamad, Prime Minister of Malaysia
- 2000: Princess Basma bint Talal of Jordan
- 2001: Gloria Macapagal Arroyo, President of the Philippines
- 2001: Prince Al Waleed bin Talal Al Saud
- 2004: Queen Silvia of Sweden, Queen Consort of Sweden
- 2004: Leonid Kuchma, President of Ukraine
- 2006: Susilo Bambang Yudhoyono, President of Indonesia
- 2010: Tun Abdullah Ahmad Badawi, Prime Minister of Malaysia
- 2010: Dato' Sri Haji Mohammad Najib Razak, Prime Minister of Malaysia
- 2013: Willem-Alexander of the Netherlands, as Prince of Orange
- 2013: Queen Máxima of the Netherlands, as Princess of Orange
- 2014: Tun Pehin Sri Haji Abdul Taib Mahmud, Yang di-Pertua Negeri of Sarawak
- 2015: Joko Widodo, President of Indonesia
- 2019: Tunku Azizah Aminah, Raja Permaisuri Agong of Malaysia
- 2022: Lee Hsien Loong, Prime Minister of Singapore
- 2025: Vjosa Osmani, President of Kosovo
- 2025: Prabowo Subianto, President of Indonesia
- 2026: Anwar Ibrahim, Prime Minister of Malaysia
- Hosni Mubarak, President of Egypt
- Raja Perempuan Tengku Anis
- Idris Talog Davies

== See also ==
- Family Order of Seri Utama
