= Prince Mohamed Bolkiah =

Bruneian prince (born 1947)

Mohamed Bolkiah محمد بولكيه
- Pengiran Perdana Wazir Sahibul Himmah Wal-Waqar
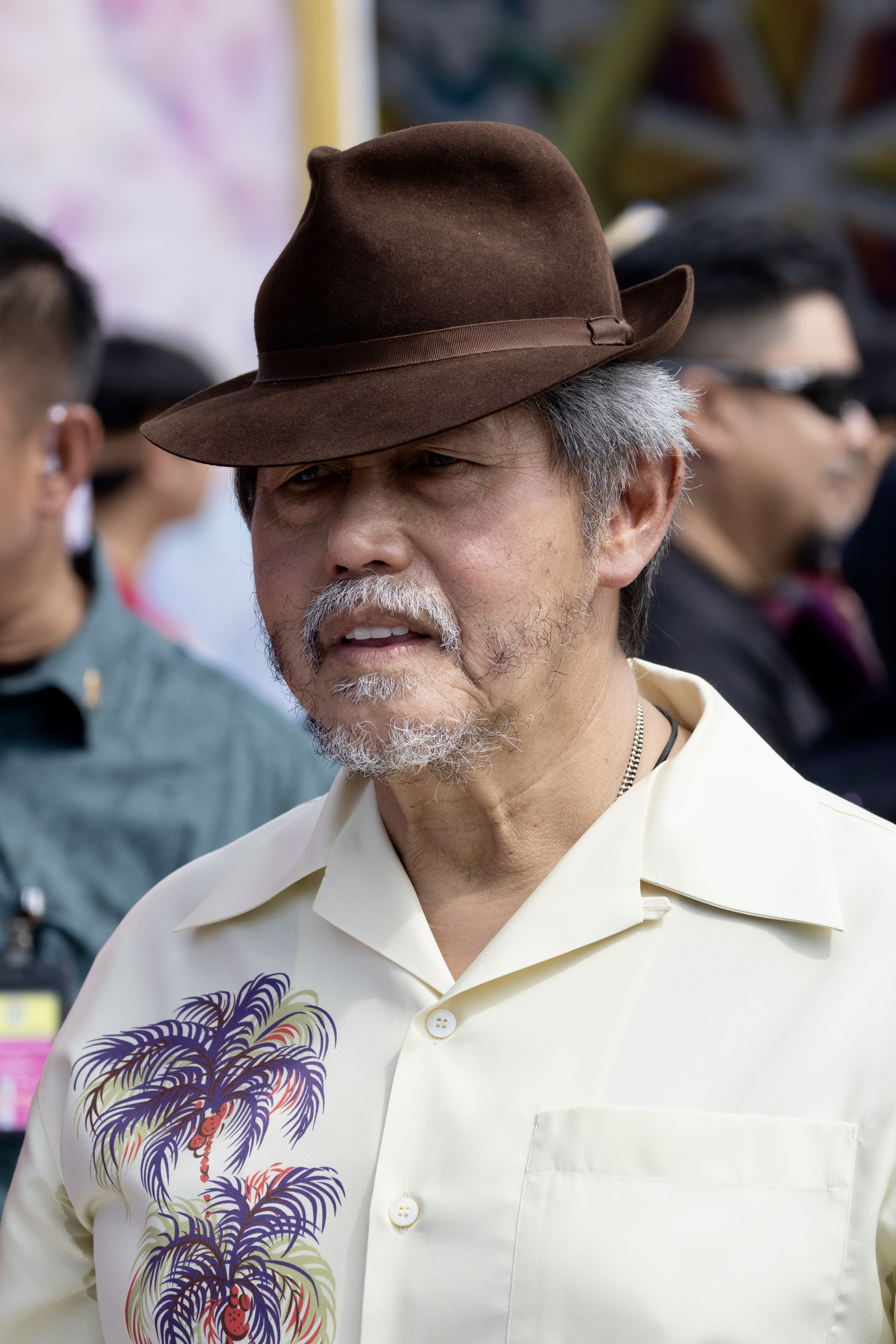
- Mohamed Bolkiah in 2024

1st Minister of Foreign Affairs and Trade
- In office 1 January 1984 – 22 October 2015
- Monarch: Hassanal Bolkiah
- Deputy: Zakaria Sulaiman; Ali Mohammad Daud
- Preceded by: Office established
- Succeeded by: Hassanal Bolkiah
- Born: 27 August 1947 (age 79); Istana Darussalam, Brunei Town, Brunei
- Spouse: Pengiran Anak Zariah (m. 1970; died 2026)
- Issue: List: Pengiran Anak Taiyibah Qalbul Bolqiah; Pengiran Muda Abdul Qawi; Pengiran Anak Ruqiyah Mataul Bulqiah; Pengiran Muda Abdul Fattaah; Pengiran Muda Abdul Mu'min; Pengiran Anak Mansurah Izzul Bolkiah; Pengiran Muda Omar Ali; Pengiran Anak Khaliilah Khalilatul Bolqiah; Pengiran Anak Naafi'ah Khairul Bulqiah; Pengiran Muda Abdul Muqtadir
Regnal name
- Pengiran Muda Mohamed Bolkiah ibni Al-Marhum Sultan Haji Omar Ali Saifuddien Sa’adul Khairi Waddien
- House: Bolkiah
- Father: Sultan Omar Ali Saifuddien III
- Mother: Pengiran Anak Damit
- Religion: Islam
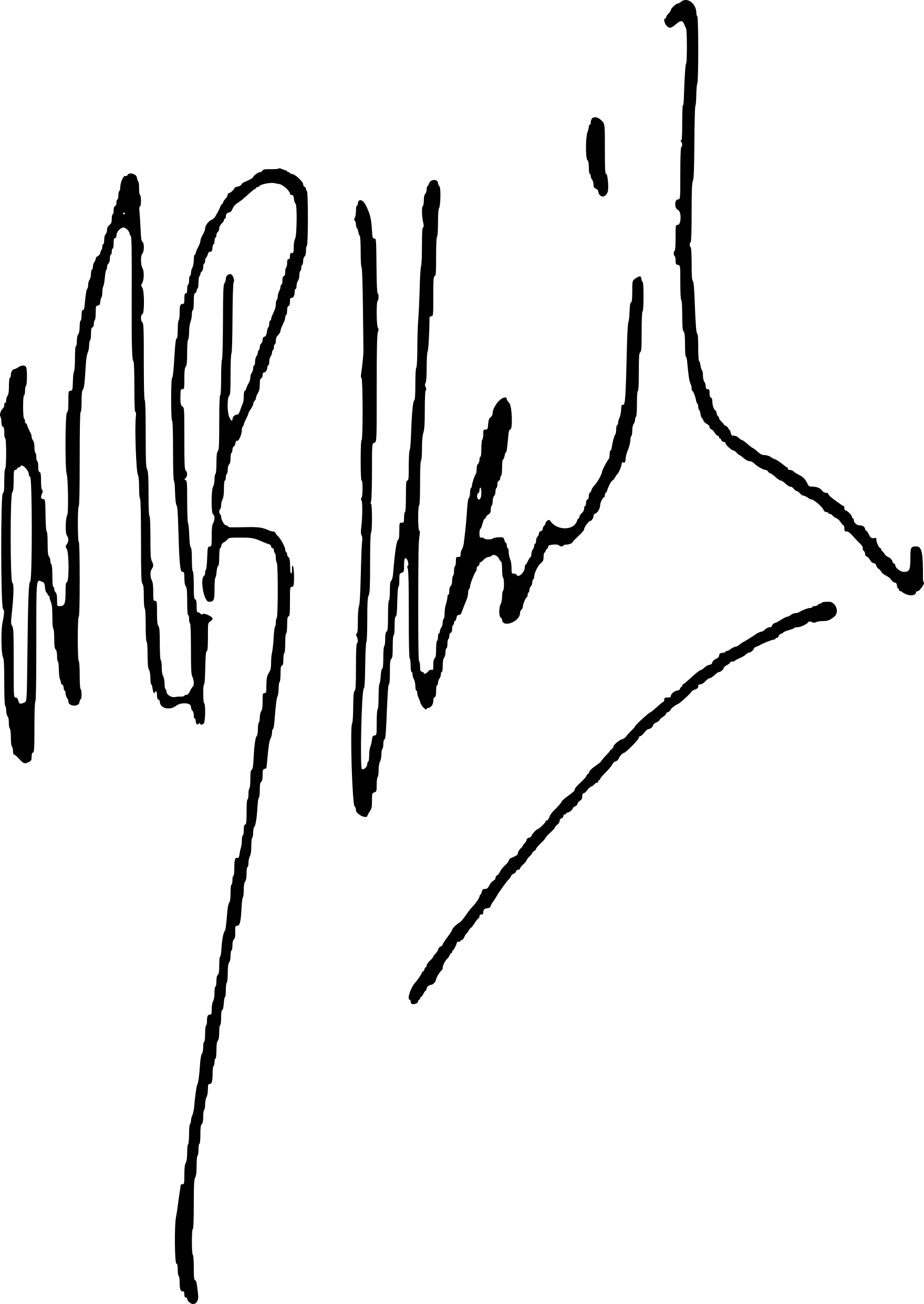
- Signature

Mohamed Bolkiah ibni Omar Ali Saifuddien III (born 27 August 1947) is a member of the royal family of Brunei. He is the second son of Omar Ali Saifuddien III, the 28th Sultan of Brunei, and Raja Isteri (Queen) Pengiran Anak Damit. After Brunei's independence in 1984, he became the country's first foreign minister, serving from 1 January 1984 until 22 October 2015, alongside the second Minister of Foreign Affairs and Trade, Lim Jock Seng.

== Early life and education ==
Pengiran Muda (Prince) Mohamed Bolkiah was born on 27 August 1947 at Istana Darussalam, Brunei Town (now called Bandar Seri Begawan). He is the second son of Sultan Omar Ali Saifuddien III, the 28th Sultan of Brunei, and his wife, Raja Isteri Pengiran Anak Damit. Among his siblings are the current Sultan Hassanal Bolkiah, Prince Sufri Bolkiah, Prince Jefri Bolkiah, Princess Masna, Princess Nor'ain, Princess Amal Umi Kalthum Al-Islam, Princess Amal Rakiah, Princess Amal Nasibah and Princess Amal Jefriah.

In an interview, Abdul Ghani bin Jamil disclosed that Sultan Hassanal Bolkiah, Prince Mohamed Bolkiah, Princess Masna Bolkiah, Princess Nor'ain, Queen Saleha, Pengiran Muda Abdul Rahman, Pengiran Anak Yusof, Pengiran Anak Puteh, Pengiran Anak Ja'afar, and Pengiran Muda Apong were students at the Istana Darul Hana Surau.

Afterwards in 1960, he attended his secondary education with his brother Hassanal Bolkiah at Victoria Institution in Kuala Lumpur, Malaysia until 1963. From 1964 until 1965, he studied his GCE 'A' Levels at Omar Ali Saifuddien College, Brunei. From there, he would then be enrolled into Sandhurst Military Academy, United Kingdom. He was commissioned as a junior lieutenant in the Irish Guards, in 1967.

== Perdana Wazir ==
Since 1906, Mohamed Bolkiah was appointed by his father, Sultan Omar Ali Saifuddien III, as Pengiran Temenggong Sahibol Bahar, on 29 September 1967. He became a wazir upon receiving the title, surpassing both the Pengiran Anak Mohamed Alam and Pengiran Muda Hashim in importance. In keeping with protocol, the ceremony to install the new wazir took place at the Istana Darul Hana Throne Room. He was chosen to serve on the Privy Council the same year.

Upon Sultan Hassanal Bolkiah's coronation, all traditional ministerial positions were filled. In February 1970, he was bestowed with the new title of Pengiran Perdana Wazir Sahibul Himmah Wal-Waqar, head of the traditional Brunei wazirs, meaning "eyes and ears" of the ruler, by his brother. On 23 September 1974, he was appointed as the honorary police commissioner of the Royal Brunei Police Force (RBPF).

== Ministerial career ==
Immediately following the independence of Brunei on 1 January 1984, Mohamed Bolkiah was appointed Minister of Foreign Affairs and Trade. In an effort to fortify its global Islamic identity, Brunei joined the Organisation of Islamic Cooperation (OIC) in January 1984 in addition to ASEAN and the UN. As soon as Brunei gained independence, it also joined the Commonwealth, whose goal is to advance world peace and order, something that the Bruneian administration actively pursued. Only until that same year, he was the President of the National Bank of Brunei (NBB).

Speaking at the ASEAN ministerial summit in Singapore in June 1982, Mohamed Bolkiah said that Brunei, a tiny nation, "gives considerable emphasis to the concept of non-interference." Any attempt by one member state to meddle in another's domestic affairs would be detrimental to the cohesiveness and sustainability of the ASEAN. He added that ASEAN always reached decisions by agreement, which is just how Brunei would like to operate. It was in line with the nation's customs. Brunei was undoubtedly at ease and felt like they belonged in their new local surroundings.

During the early 1960s until Brunei's independence and ASEAN membership in 1984, Bruneian passports were not accepted for travel to Indonesia or other communist nations. The friendship that President Suharto consistently extended to Brunei changed the country's relationship with Indonesia and gave Brunei the confidence in its independence that was uncommon in the 1950s and early 1960s, according to him.

The Malaysian Foreign Minister Ghazali Shafie invited Mohamed Bolkiah and Brunei's Attorney General to attend the 37th United Nations Assembly in September 1982. The objective was to examine closely how the United Nations General Assembly operates in New York as it gets ready to become independent. Mohamed Bolkiah was in New York in 1983 for the 38th United Nations General Assembly. At the 39th United Nations General Assembly on 21 September 1984, Brunei formally became a member of the UN in an effort to solidify its standing within the global organisation.

Mohamed Bolkiah was able to formally announce Brunei's intention to join ASEAN only in June 1983. But nonetheless, Mohamed Bolkiah said, he was feeling his way carefully. Six weeks before to gaining independence, in November 1983, the Bruneian government officially announced that Brunei would join ASEAN as its sixth member on 7 January 1984. ASEAN's unambiguous track record of unity and cooperation struck Mohamed Bolkiah as unusual. Indeed, Brunei's best insurance policy was to join ASEAN right away, as "the five founding states would be obliged to be restrained in political intent towards their new regional partner," suited the Sultanate's security interests.

Prince Mohamed Bolkiah was reported to have primary authority over QAF Holdings. During the cabinet reshuffle on 22 October 2015, he was replaced by his elder brother, the Sultan himself. In spite of this, he continues to meet foreign dignitaries and participate in royal ceremonies and national events.

Raja Reza was granted permission to meet Mohamed Bolkiah on 3 November 2022, at the Balai Penghadapan, Bukit Kayangan, Bandar Seri Begawan. During their meeting, they discussed a range of topics, including the bilateral relationship between Brunei and Malaysia, the current cooperation between the two countries, and efforts to encourage more foreign direct investment (FDI) from Malaysia to this nation in the future.

== Personal life ==
=== Family ===
On 9 July 1970, Mohamed Bolkiah married his first cousin, Yang Teramat Mulia (HRH) Pengiran Anak Isteri Pengiran Anak Hajah Zariah binti Al-Marhum Pengiran Pemancha Pengiran Anak Haji Mohamed Alam, the sister of Pengiran Anak Hajah Saleha, the Raja Isteri (Queen). Their marriage lasted for 56 years until her death on 6 October 2026. Together they had 10 children whom are;

Name	Birth	Marriage		Their children
Name	Birth	Date	Spouse	Their children
Pengiran Anak Hajah Taiyibah Qalbul Bolqiah	11 June 1972	4 April 2004	Pengiran Haji Mohammad Hakimmuddin bin Pengiran Haji Hashim	Pengiran Wajeeh Al-Bolkiah
Pengiran Anak Hajah Taiyibah Qalbul Bolqiah	11 June 1972	4 April 2004	Pengiran Haji Mohammad Hakimmuddin bin Pengiran Haji Hashim	Pengiran Qaiyimah Nurul Bolkiah
Pengiran Muda Abdul Qawi	27 January 1974	27 June 2013	Tengku Amalin A’ishah Putri binti Almarhum Sultan Ismail Petra of Kelantan	Pengiran Anak Tengku Afeefah Musyafaah Bolkiah Putri
Pengiran Muda Abdul Qawi	27 January 1974	27 June 2013	Tengku Amalin A’ishah Putri binti Almarhum Sultan Ismail Petra of Kelantan	Pengiran Anak Tengku Azzahra Iffatul Bolkiah Putri
Pengiran Muda Abdul Qawi	27 January 1974	27 June 2013	Tengku Amalin A’ishah Putri binti Almarhum Sultan Ismail Petra of Kelantan	Pengiran Anak Tengku Zaafirah Muizzah Bolkiah Putri
Pengiran Muda Abdul Qawi	27 January 1974	27 June 2013	Tengku Amalin A’ishah Putri binti Almarhum Sultan Ismail Petra of Kelantan	Pengiran Anak Tengku Abdul Muhaimin Bolkiah Petra
Pengiran Anak Hajah Ruqiyah Mataul Bulqiah	2 May 1976	None		
Pengiran Muda Dr. Abdul Fattaah	8 March 1982	10 September 2018	Dayangku Elina Zuraidah binti Pengiran Kamaluddin	None
Pengiran Muda Abdul Mu'min	17 July 1984	None		
Pengiran Anak Mansurah Izzul Bolkiah	1 October 1986	None		
Pengiran Muda Omar Ali	28 November 1988	None		
Pengiran Anak Khaliilah Khalilatul Bolqiah	19 July 1990	None		
Pengiran Anak Naafi'ah Khairul Bulqiah	27 May 1992	None		
Pengiran Muda Abdul Muqtadir	—N/a	None		

== Books ==
- Bolkiah, Mohamed (2000). Time and the River. Brunei Darussalam: Brunei Press. ISBN 9789991732039.
- Bolkiah, Mohamed (2007). Remember, Remember.....The 8th of December. Brunei Press.
- Bolkiah, Mohamed (2008). A Southeast Asian Community: More Than a Matter of Geography. ISEAS Publishing. ISBN 9789812307866.
- Bolkiah, Mohamed (2013). Association. Brunei Press.
- Bolkiah, Mohamed (2016). Sana'a to San Jose' 1984 - 2015: the first 30 years of Brunei Darussalam's modern foreign affairs Mohamed Bolkiah. ISBN 9789991732466.
- Bolkiah, Mohamed (2019). Action Point. Brunei Press. ISBN 9789991798264.

== Titles, styles and honours ==
Styles of Prince Mohamed Bolkiah
- Reference style: His Royal Highness
- Spoken style: Your Royal Highness
- Alternative style: Duli Tuanku

Personal standard of Pengiran Perdana Wazir Sahibul Himmah Wal-Waqar

=== Titles and styles ===
- 27 August 1947 – 29 September 1967: Yang Teramat Mulia Paduka Seri Duli
- 29 September 1967 – 6 February 1970: Yang Teramat Mulia Seri Paduka Duli Pengiran Temenggong Sahibul Bahar
- Since 6 February 1970: Duli Yang Teramat Mulia Paduka Seri Pengiran Perdana Wazir Sahibul Himmah Wal-Waqar

=== Military ranks ===
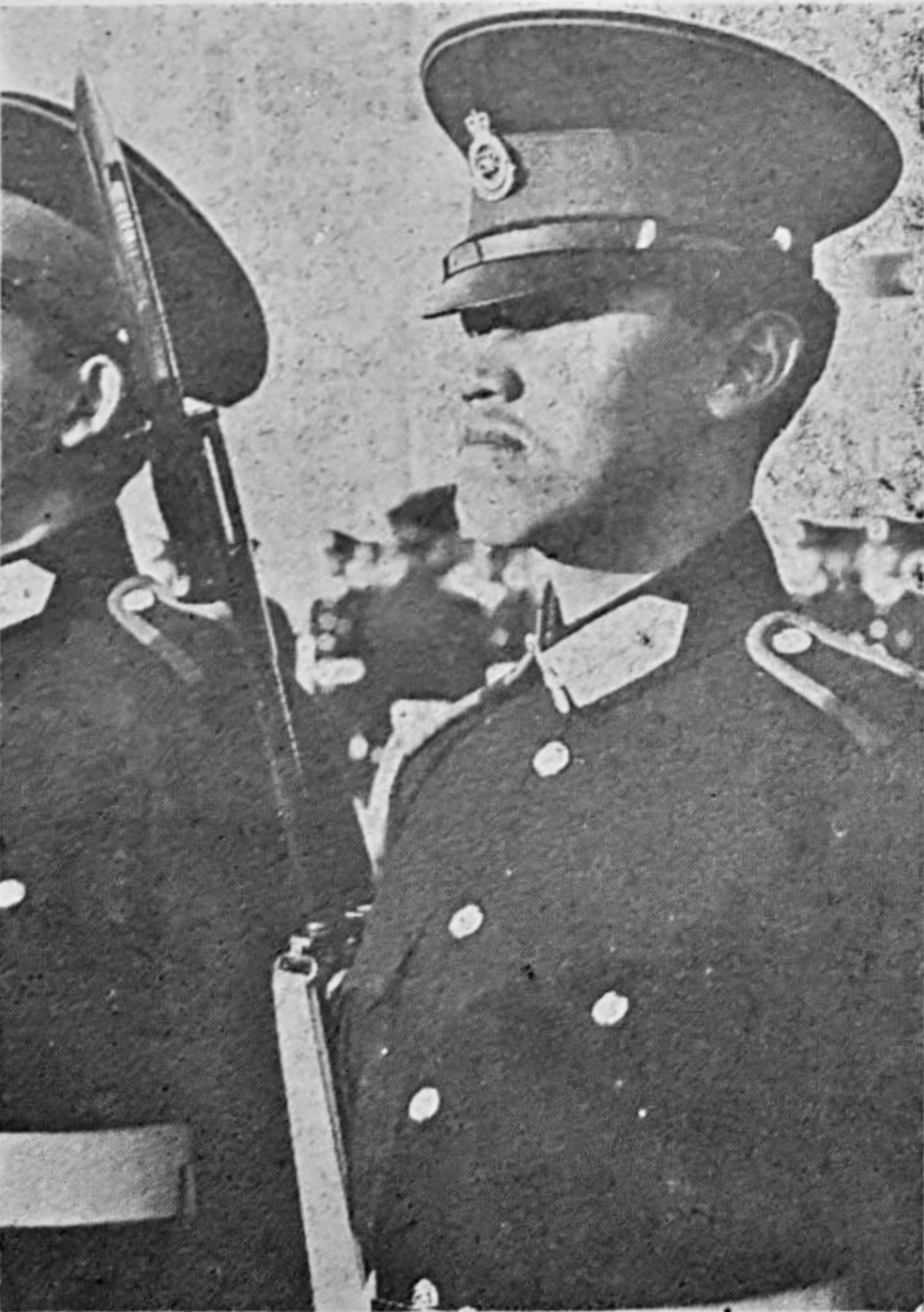
First Lieutenant Mohamed Bolkiah in the Irish Guards at Sandhurst, 1967

Brunei

- Royal Brunei Land Force
  - 1 November 1970: Honorary Lieutenant Colonel, Royal Brunei Malay Regiment
  - 1 September 1972: Honorary Colonel, Royal Brunei Malay Regiment

United Kingdom

- British Army
  - 1 March 1968: Honorary Second Lieutenant, Irish Guards
  - 15 November 1971: Honorary Lieutenant, Irish Guards

=== Things named after him ===
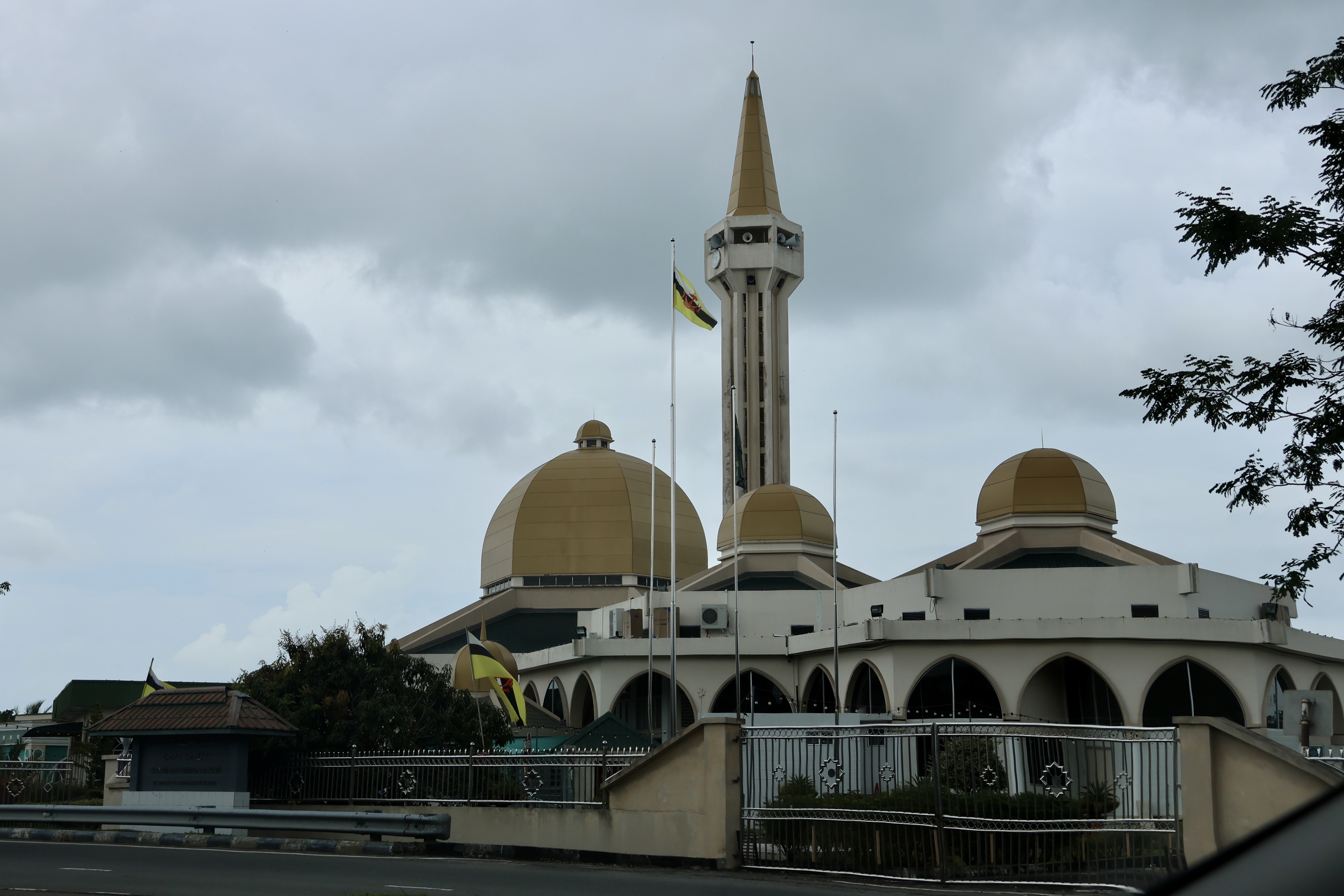
Mohamed Bolkiah Mosque

- Mohamed Bolkiah Mosque, a mosque in Kampong Serusop.
- Pengiran Muda Mohammed Bolkiah Religious School, a religious school in Temburong District.
- Jalan Mohamad Bolkiah, a road in Tutong Camp.

=== Honours ===
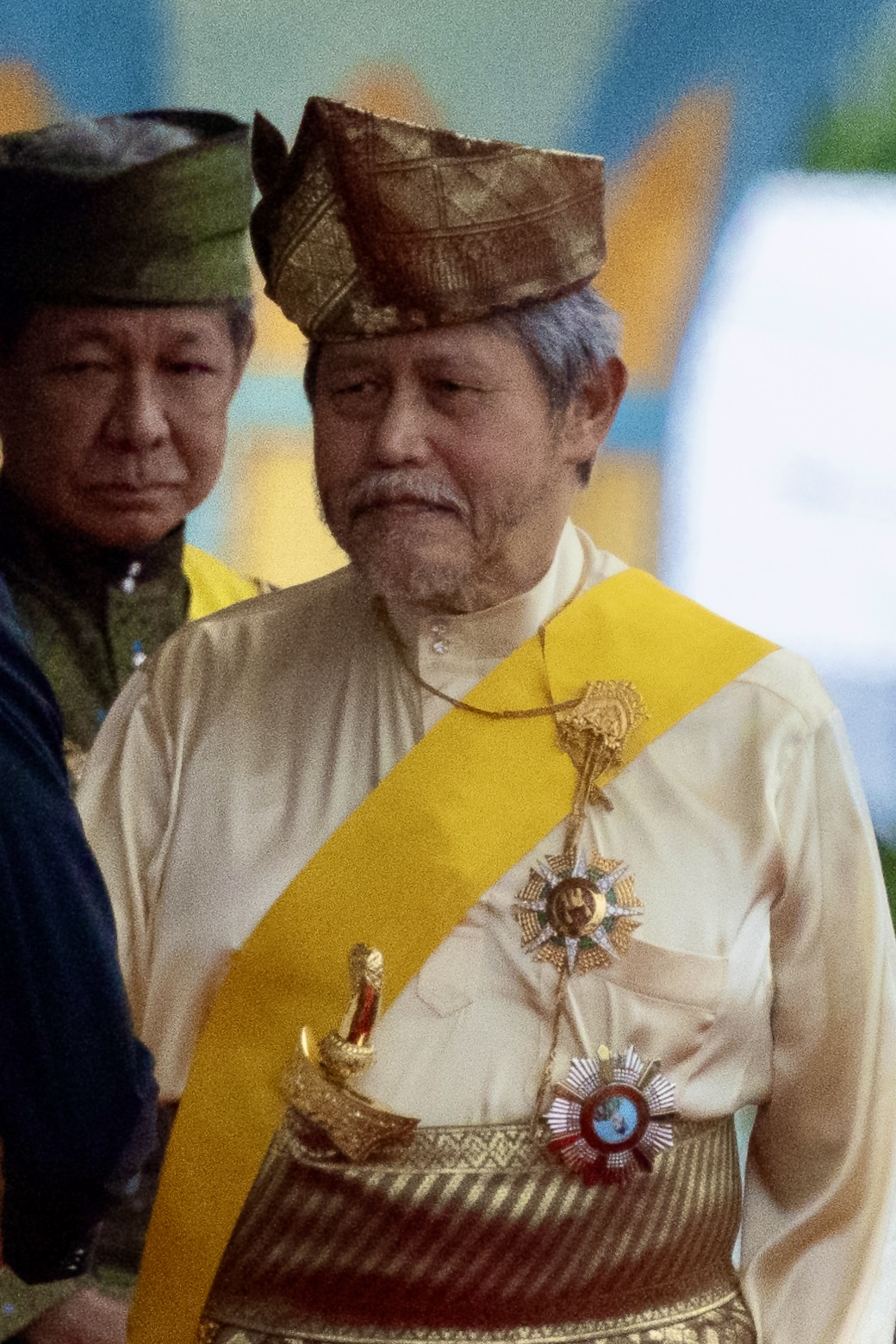
Mohamed Bolkiah wearing his ceremonial dress

Mohamed Bolkiah has received the following national honours;

- Royal Family Order of the Crown of Brunei (DKMB)
- Family Order of Laila Utama (DK; 24 January 1964) – Dato Laila Utama
- Family Order of Seri Utama (DK; 23 September 1962) – Dato Seri Utama
- Sultan Hassanal Bolkiah Medal (PHBS; 1 August 1968)
- Omar Ali Saifuddin Medal (POAS)
- Pingat Bakti Laila Ikhlas (PBLI; 1975)
- Meritorious Service Medal (PJK; 1954)
- Proclamation of Independence Medal (1997)
- Coronation Medal (1 August 1968)
- Sultan of Brunei Silver Jubilee Medal (5 October 1992)
- Sultan of Brunei Golden Jubilee Medal (5 October 2017)
- National Day Silver Jubilee Medal (23 February 2009)
- Royal Brunei Armed Forces Silver Jubilee Medal (31 May 1986)
- General Service Medal (Armed Forces)
- General Service Medal (Police)
- Police 75 Years Medal (1996)

In addition, he has received several foreign honours:

- Japan:
  - Grand Cordon of the Order of the Rising Sun (2009)
- Malaysia:
  - Royal Family Order of Kelantan (DK; 24 October 2022)
  - Knight Grand Commander of the Order of the Crown of Johor (SPMJ) – Dato'
  - Grand Knight of the Order of Sultan Ahmad Shah (SSAP) – Dato' Sri
  - Grand Knight of the Order of Cura Si Manja Kini (SPCM) – Dato' Seri
  - Companion of the Order of Sultan Salahuddin Abdul Aziz Shah (SSA)
  - Sultan Salahuddin Silver Jubilee Medal (3 September 1985)
- United Kingdom:
  - Honorary Knight Grand Cross of the Order of St Michael and St George (GCMG) – Sir (17 September 1998)
  - Honorary Commander of the Royal Victorian Order (CVO; 29 February 1972)
  - Queen Elizabeth II Silver Jubilee Medal (1977)
- Germany:
  - Grand Cross of the Order of Merit of the Federal Republic of Germany (16 November 1985)
- South Korea:
  - Grand Gwanghwa Medal of the Order of Diplomatic Service Merit
- Thailand:
  - Knight Grand Cross of the Order of the White Elephant (PCh (KCE))
  - Knight Grand Cordon of the Order of the Crown of Thailand (MVM (KGCT))
- Philippines:
  - Grand Cross of the Order of the Golden Heart (GCrGH; 1 August 2007)

Political offices
Preceded by Office established	1st Minister of Foreign Affairs and Trade; 1 January 1984 – 22 October 2015	Succeeded by Hassanal Bolkiah
Prince Mohamed Bolkiah House of Bolkiah Born: 27 August 1947
Preceded by Abdul Wakeel	Succession to the Bruneian throne 7th position	Succeeded by Abdul Qawi
Regnal titles
Preceded by Hashim Jalilul Alam Aqamaddin	Pengiran Temenggong Sahibul Bahar; 1967–1970	Succeeded by Pengiran Mohammed
Preceded by Post created	Pengiran Perdana Wazir Sahibul Himmah Wal-Waqar; 1970–present	Incumbent
