= Pingat Hassanal Bolkiah Sultan =

Honorary medal of Brunei

Sultan Hassanal Bolkiah Medal Pingat Hassanal Bolkiah Sultan
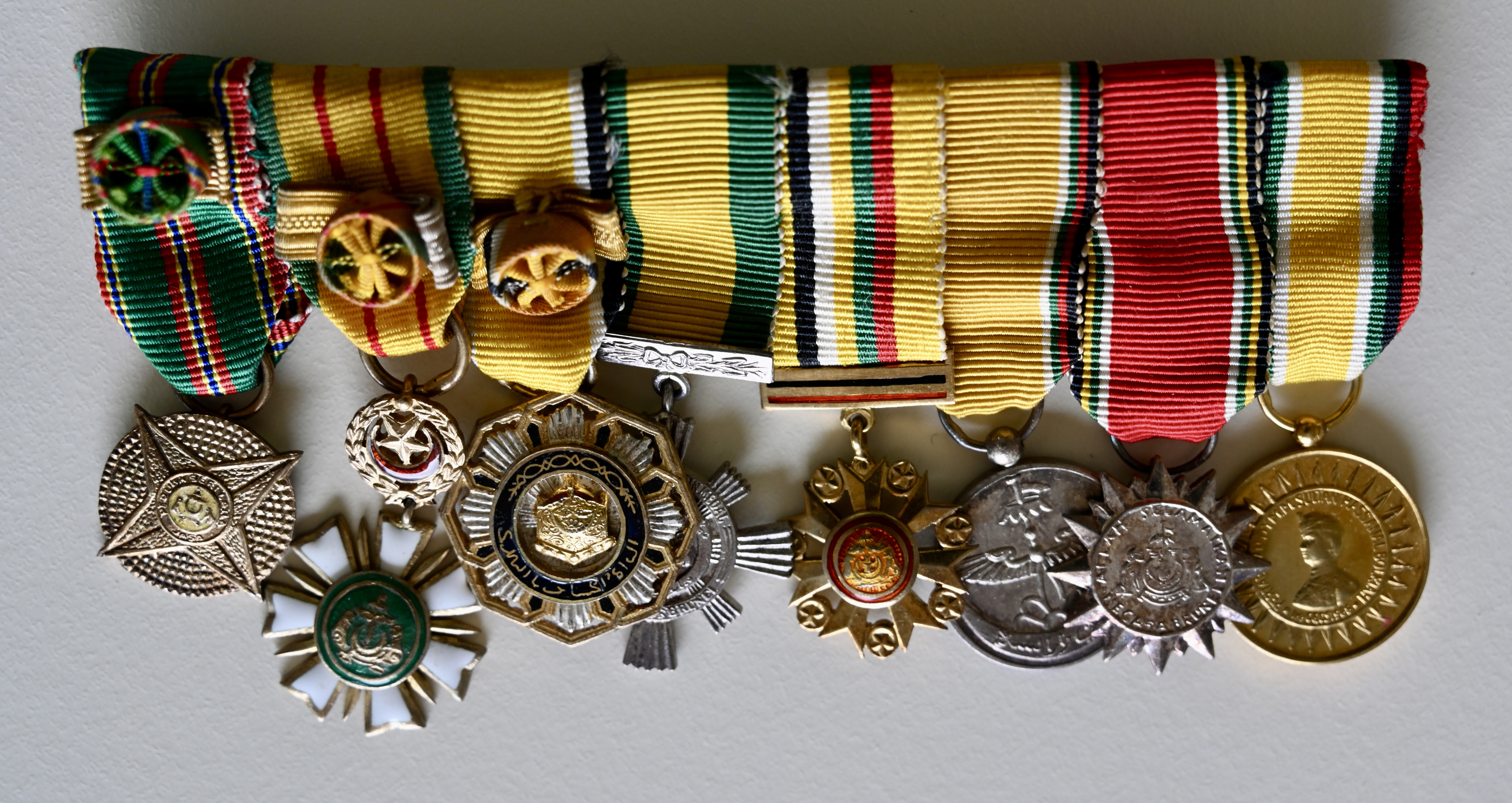
- PHBS (4th from right)

Awarded by the Sultan of Brunei
- Type: State
- Country: Brunei
- Ribbon
- Classes: First Class; Second Class
- Post-nominals: PHBS

The Pingat Hassanal Bolkiah Sultan (Sultan Hassanal Bolkiah Medal) is an honorary medal of Brunei. The award is subdivided into two classes: the first class Darjah Pertama and the second class Darjah Kedua.

The Sultan was receptive to the proposal and expressed his excitement when a former classmate of his from Class '64 of Sultan Omar Ali Saifuddien College proposed a reunion supper. The Sultan personally agreed to present each of his old pupils with the PHBS at the banquet.

== Description ==
The first class medal included a small badge that matched a silver-gilt and enamel item.

== Recipients ==
- Crown Prince Al-Muhtadee Billah
- Queen Saleha
- Prince Mohamed Bolkiah
- Prince Jefri Bolkiah
- Prince Sufri Bolkiah
- Prince Abdul Mateen
- Princess Muta-Wakkilah Hayatul
- Princess Masna
- Princess Majeedah Nuurul
- Princess Hafizah Sururul
- Pengiran Anak Abdul Aziz
- Pengiran Anak Besar
- Pengiran Anak Hashim
- Pengiran Anak Idris
- Pengiran Anak Mohamed Alam
- Pengiran Anak Mohammad Yusof
- Pengiran Abdul Momin (born 1923)
- Pengiran Abu Bakar Umar
- Pengiran Abu Bakar Salleh
- Pengiran Asmalee
- Pengiran Bahrin
- Pengiran Ibnu Basit
- Pengiran Jaya
- Pengiran Mohammed Abdul Rahman Piut
- Pengiran Mokhtar Puteh
- Pengiran Muhammad Ali
- Pengiran Umar
- Abdul Aziz Juned
- Abdul Hamid Bakal
- Abdul Rahman Taha
- Abu Bakar Apong
- Abu Bakar Jambol
- Judin Asar
- Jocklin Kongpaw
- Isa Ibrahim
- Zain Serudin
- Badaruddin Othman
- Abbas Al-Sufri
- Zakaria Sulaiman
- Hussain Mohammad Yusof
- Abidin Abdul Rashid
- Lim Jock Seng
- Lim Teck Hoo
- Lim Cheng Choo
- Goh King Chin
- Sulaiman Damit
- Ismail Omar Abdul Aziz
- Eusoff Agaki Ismail
- Nawawi Taha (revoked)
- Mariam Abdul Aziz
- Abdu'r Rahmani
- Ariffin Abdul Wahab
- Musa Yakub
- Kefli Razali
- Marianne Elisabeth Lloyd-Dolbey
- James Richard Henry Burns
- George Edwin Coster
- Idris Talog Davies
