= Pengiran Anak Mohamed Alam =

Bruneian legislative speaker (1918–1982)

Yang Teramat Mulia Seri Paduka Pengiran Pemancha Sahibul Rae' Wal Mashuarah Pengiran Anak Mohamed Alam DK SPMB DSNB OBE POAS PHBS PJK
- ڤڠيرن انق محمد عالم
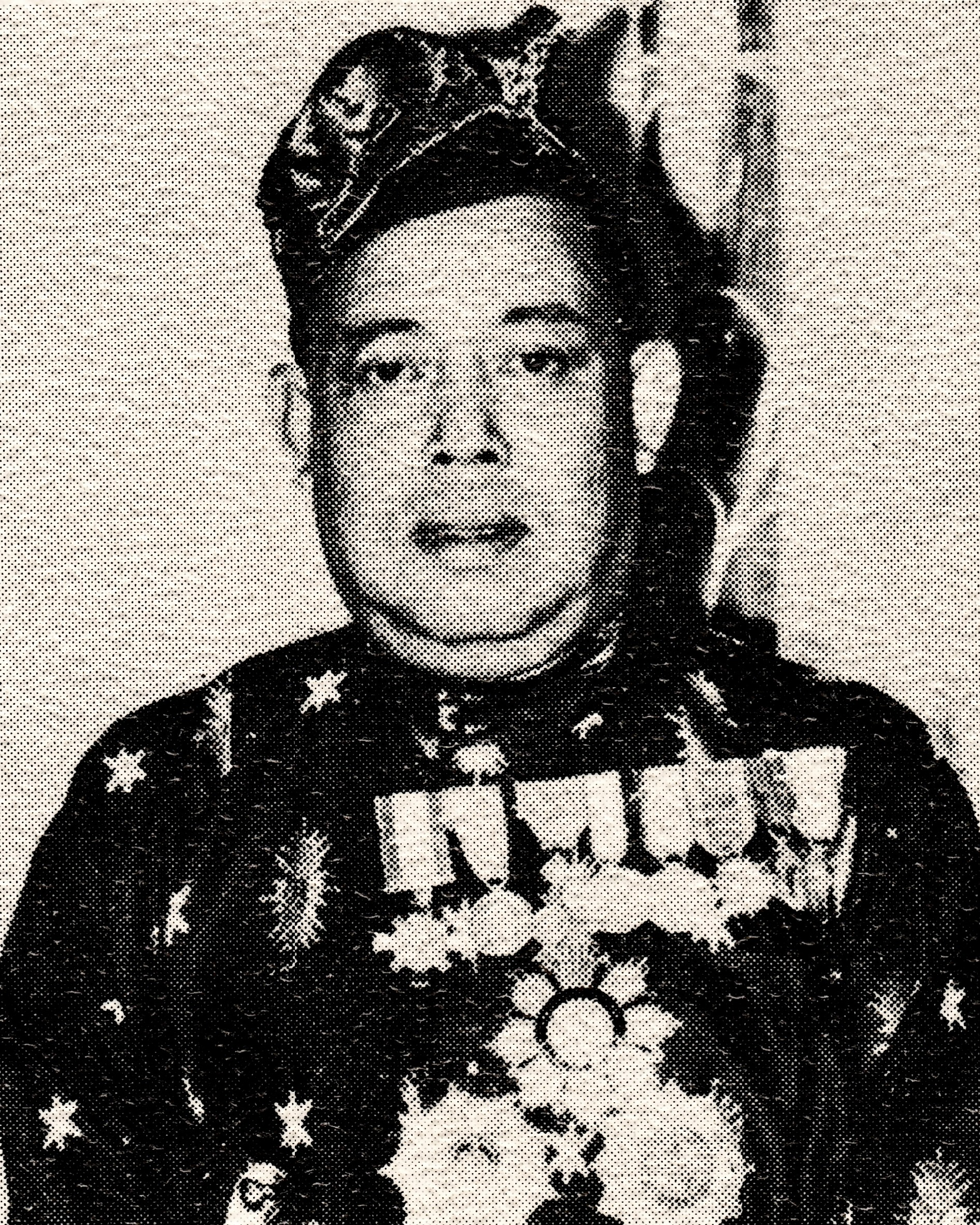
- Pengiran Anak Mohamed Alam in 1968

4th Speaker of the Legislative Council of Brunei
- In office 14 July 1971 – 30 November 1974
- Monarch: Hassanal Bolkiah
- Menteri Besar: Pengiran Muhammad Yusuf; Pengiran Abdul Momin
- Preceded by: Ibrahim Mohammad Jahfar
- Succeeded by: Pengiran Abu Bakar

1st Chief of Adat Istiadat Negara
- In office 1 July 1954 – 30 November 1981
- Preceded by: Office established
- Succeeded by: Pengiran Anak Mohammad Yusof

Personal details
- Born: 18 October 1918 Kampong Pengiran Bendahara Lama, Brunei Town, Brunei
- Died: 14 December 1982 (aged 64) Bandar Seri Begawan, Brunei
- Resting place: Royal Mausoleum, Bandar Seri Begawan, Brunei
- Spouse: Pengiran Anak Besar (m. 1943)
- Children: 9; including Pengiran Anak Mohammad Yusof, Pengiran Anak Puteh, and Queen Saleha
- Relatives: Pengiran Muda Hashim (brother); Queen Damit (sister)
- Education: Malay College Kuala Kangsar
- Occupation: Civil servant; magistrate

Pengiran Anak Mohamed Alam (Note: The alternate spelling of his given name is "Pengiran Muda Muhammad Alam" or "Pengiran Anak Mohammad Alam" rather than "Pengiran Anak Mohamed Alam.") (18 October 1918 – 14 December 1982) was a civil servant and noble magistrate who held the position of Pengiran Pemancha in Brunei. Serving from 1950 until 1982, this title marked him as the third most senior rank within the wazir class of state officials. He served as Brunei's first chief of Adat Istiadat Negara from 1954 to 1981 before assuming the role of the fourth speaker of the Legislative Council of Brunei (LegCo) from 1971 to 1974. Notably, he was the father of Queen Saleha, the raja isteri (queen consort) to Sultan Hassanal Bolkiah, and the maternal grandfather of Al-Muhtadee Billah, the Crown Prince of Brunei.

== Early life and education ==
Pengiran Anak Mohamed Alam was born on 18 October 1918 in Kampong Pengiran Bendahara Lama, Brunei Town, now known as Bandar Seri Begawan. He was the son of Pengiran Anak Abdul Rahman, who served as Pengiran Bendahara for 25 years until his death during the Japanese occupation, and Pengiran Fatimah. As the son of a wazir, he belonged to a distinguished family and was the brother of Pengiran Muda Hashim, Pengiran Anak Omar Ali, Pengiran Anak Siti Kula, Pengiran Anak Mohammad, and Pengiran Anak Damit. He was also the great-grandson of Sultan Hashim Jalilul Alam Aqamaddin.

He began his early education informally at the Brunei Town Malay School. Between 1932 and 1936, then-Prince Omar Ali Saifuddien, at the age of eighteen, enrolled at the Malay College Kuala Kangsar in Perak, British Malaya, accompanied by his two cousins, Pengiran Anak Mohamed Alam and Pengiran Anak Abdul Kahar.

== Career ==
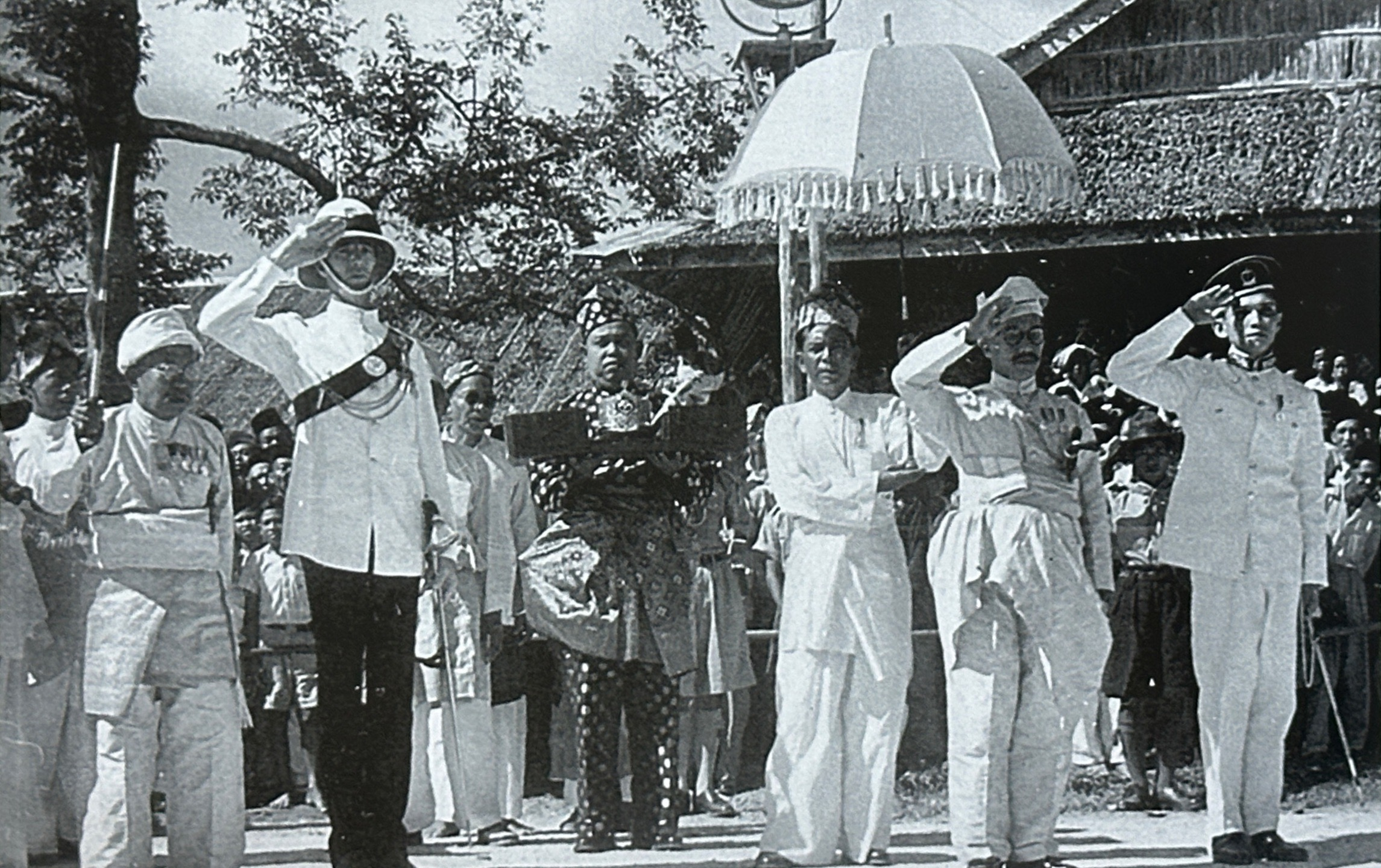
Pengiran Anak Mohamed Alam (third from the left) holding the crown during the 1951 coronation of Omar Ali Saifuddien III

Pengiran Anak Mohamed Alam began his career as a clerk at the Land Office in 1937 before transferring to the Judicial Department in 1940 and becoming a magistrate in 1948. In 1950, he was appointed district officer in Temburong. The following year, he was part of the Bruneian delegation that accompanied Sultan Omar Ali Saifuddien III on his hajj pilgrimage in Mecca. On 1 July 1954, he became the head of the Department of Customs, Religion, and Welfare, the predecessor of today's Jabatan Adat Istiadat Negara. On 28 February 1955, he became a member of the State Council followed by being a part of the Land Committee, State Financial Authority, and State Pension Authority in 1957.

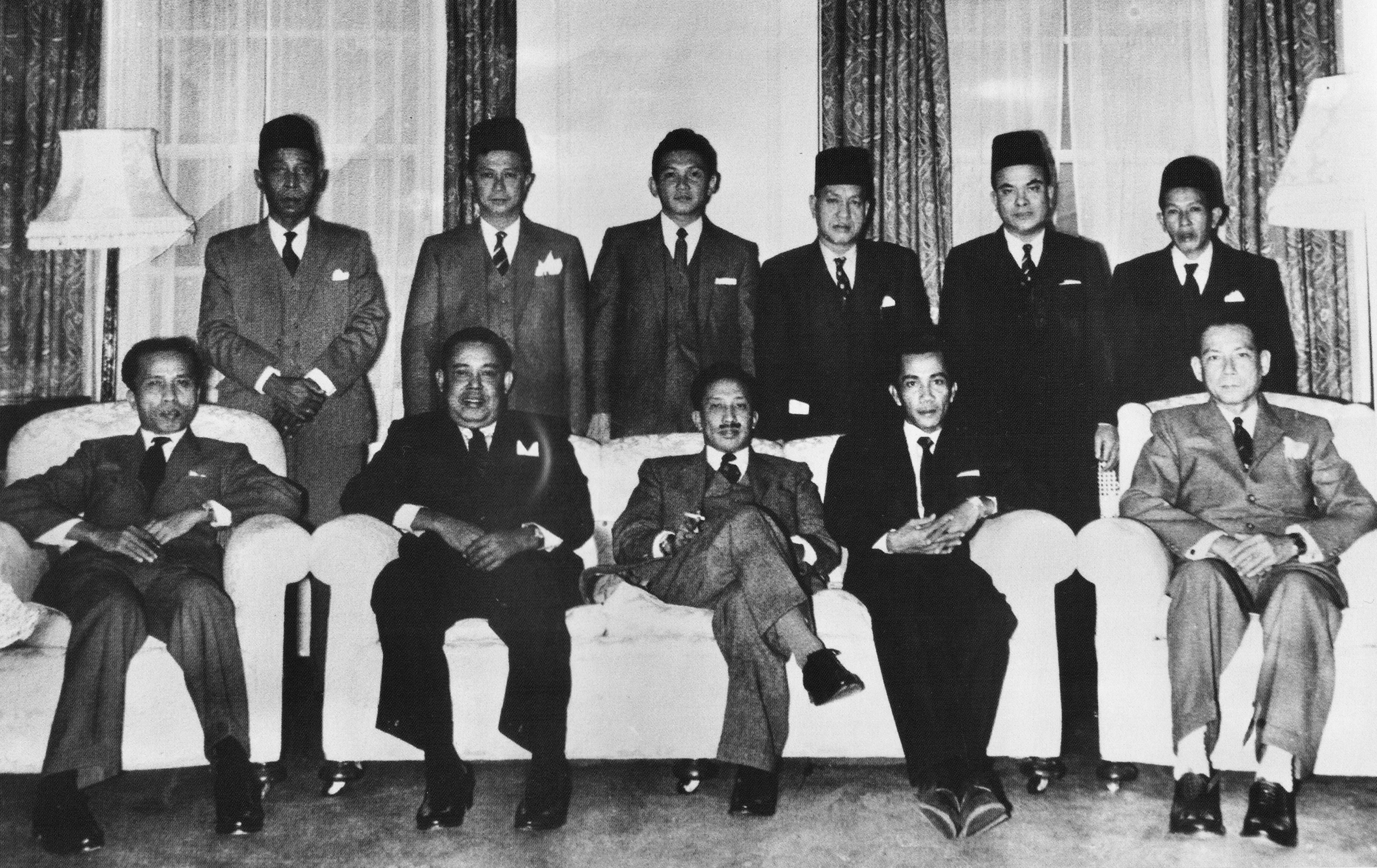
Pengiran Anak Mohamed Alam (seated second from the left) with the 1959 constitutional delegation in London

In June 1959, Pengiran Anak Mohamed Alam was appointed chairman of the grand committee responsible for organising the royal visit of Tuanku Abdul Rahman, the Yang di-Pertuan Agong, to Brunei. Later in September, he officiated the opening of Panchor Murai Malay School. On 14 March, he was part of Brunei's constitutional delegation to London, led by the sultan and involving key figures from the State Council following the signing of Brunei's constitution.

Pengiran Anak Mohamed Alam was among the dignitaries who attended the signing of Brunei's written constitution and the new agreement with the United Kingdom at the Lapau on 29 September 1959. The following month, he was appointed a member of both the Islamic Religious Council and the Adat Istiadat Council, which were established to oversee matters related to religion, customs, and the state court. He was among the 20 individuals appointed, with Pengiran Muhammad Salleh as president of the council. Additionally, he became one of the inaugural ex-officio members of the newly established LegCo. In December, he attended the Lembaga Penasihat Haji conference in the Federation of Malaya and returned to Brunei the following week.

On 1 January 1960, his office was renamed, making him the head of the Department of Customs and Social Welfare. In April, Pengiran Anak Mohamed Alam was part of the delegation accompanying the sultan of Brunei to Kuala Lumpur for the funeral ceremony of Tuanku Abdul Rahman. The following month, he was appointed a member of the Regency Council, alongside wazirs, ministers, and council members, to carry out the sultan's duties during his holiday in Malaya. In early September, he visited Seria to officiate the opening of the new building for Chung Ching Middle School as the sultan's representative. In October, he and Ahmad Daud made an official visit to Japan. He was among the distinguished figures who accompanied the sultan to Kuala Lumpur in December 1960 for the coronation of Hisamuddin of Selangor, and during the sultan's absence, he was appointed one of the regents.

His office was renamed for the last time and this made him the chief of Adat Istiadat Negara on 1 January 1961. Pengiran Anak Mohamed Alam officially opened the review grade for headmasters of Malay schools in Brunei on 10 January, emphasising the course's role in improving education and hoping for positive results, while also holding a moment of silence in memory of James Pearce. While the sultan was in Malaya, he was among the people appointed to serve as acting sultan together in May. He attended the instalment ceremony on 14 August in Istana Darul Hana, where Prince Hassanal Bolkiah was officially declared as the new Pengiran Muda Mahkota (Crown Prince). He officially opened the Boon Pang Theatre in Brunei Town on 20 September, with a screening of the film Hang Jebat. He was among the distinguished guests who witnessed Brunei Malay Regiment's first-ever military parade at Padang Besar on 9 November, alongside other state officials.

In May 1962, a Regency Council was established while the sultan was performing the hajj, with Pengiran Anak Mohamed Alam playing a key role in overseeing its functions. Later that year, on 21 November, he officially inaugurated the Kampong Panchor Murai Mosque. Following the Brunei revolt in December, Pengiran Anak Mohamed Alam, alongside other high-ranking officials, reaffirmed their unwavering loyalty to the sultan. They vowed to sacrifice everything to combat treason and strongly condemned the rebellion led by A. M. Azahari and his followers, firmly rejecting Azahari's false claims that the uprising had the support of the Bruneian people.

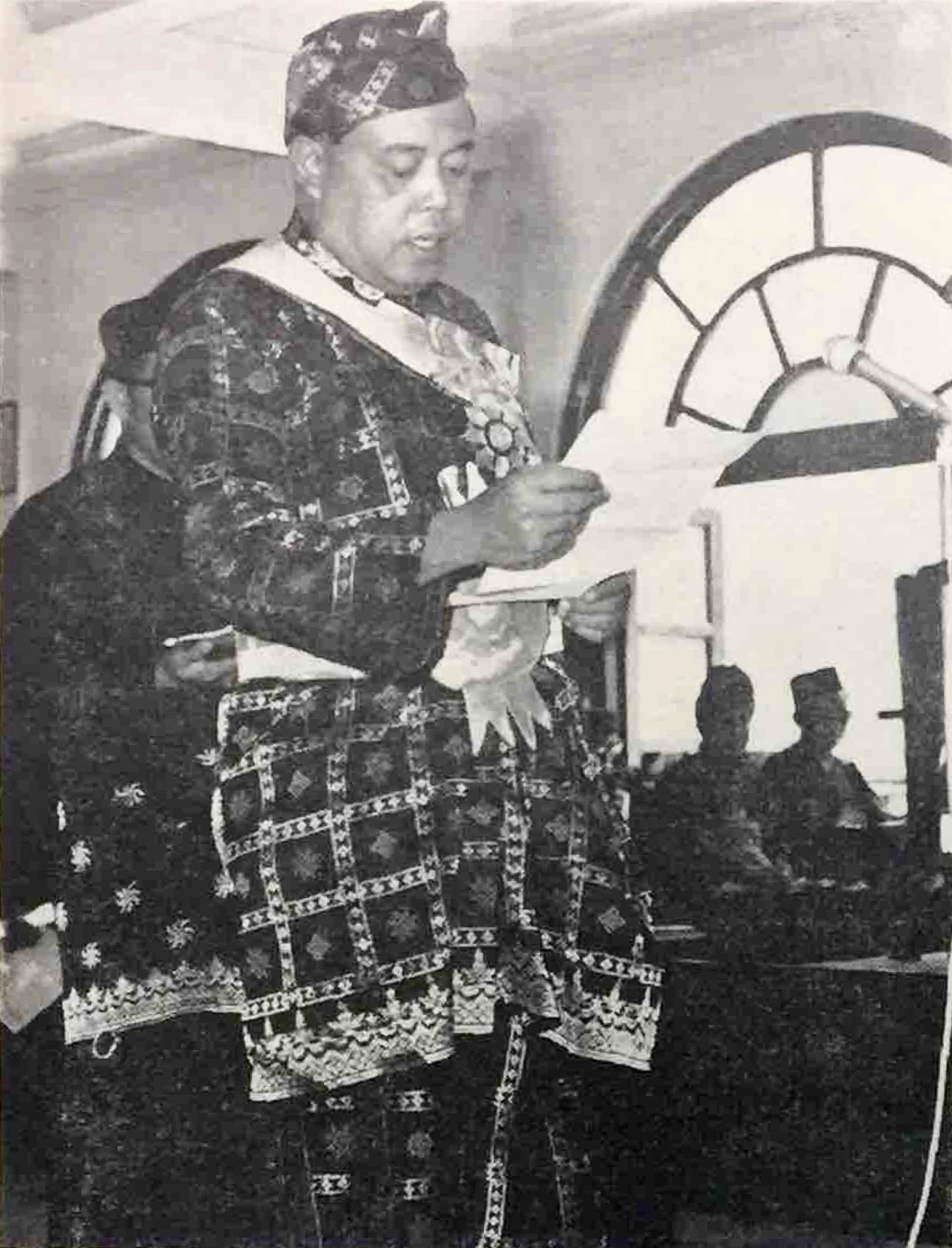
Pengiran Anak Mohamed Alam speaking at a court ceremony at Istana Darul Hana in 1964

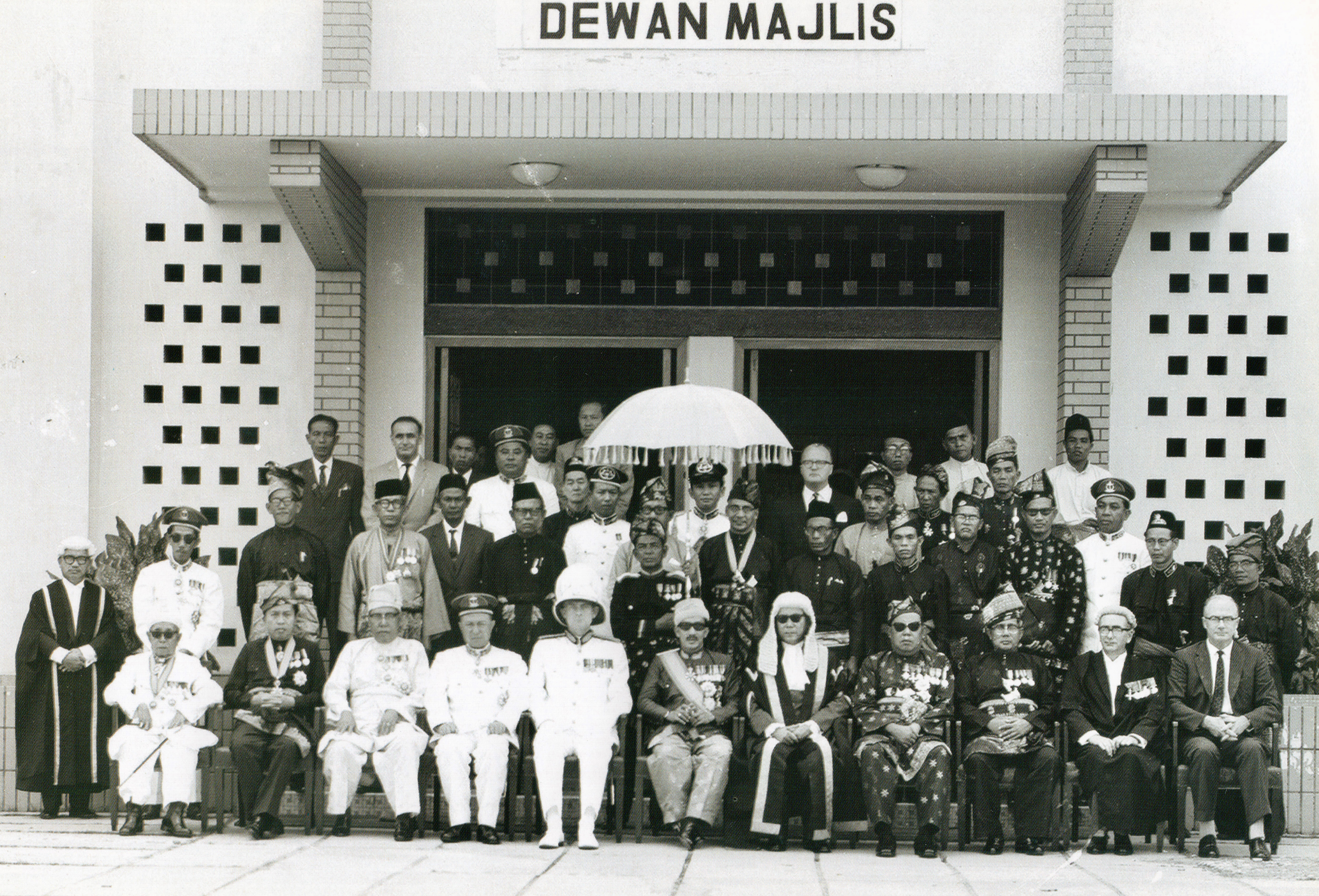
Pengiran Anak Mohamed Alam (seated fourth from the left) with the 1963 legislative council members

Pengiran Anak Mohamed Alam was appointed regent in February 1963 during the sultan's absence, as the ruler traveled to Kuala Lumpur with other members of the royal family. In June, he was designated as the sultan's deputy while the sultan was abroad for final negotiations on Brunei's entry into the Malaysian Federation. The following year, in April, he was appointed acting sultan once again when the sultan departed for the United Kingdom as part of a two-month world tour.

On 14 April 1965, Pengiran Anak Mohamed Alam, the sultan's deputy, officially opened the LegCo session at Dewan Kemasyarakatan in Brunei Town, delivering the sultan's speech from the throne. He had been appointed deputy sultan during the absence of the sultan, who left Brunei on 25 June for a journey to the United Kingdom, Europe, and the United States. On 29 July, Pengiran Anak Saleha, the eldest daughter of Pengiran Anak Mohamed Alam, married Crown Prince Hassanal Bolkiah, with the royal wedding celebrated through festivities across Brunei. He and his wife returned to Brunei on 17 October 1965 after accompanying the crown prince and his wife, who were departing for further studies. On 11 December, Pengiran Anak Mohamed Alam, on behalf of the sultan, presented a shield to Puni Malay School in Temburong, commending the school for earning the sultan's approbation.

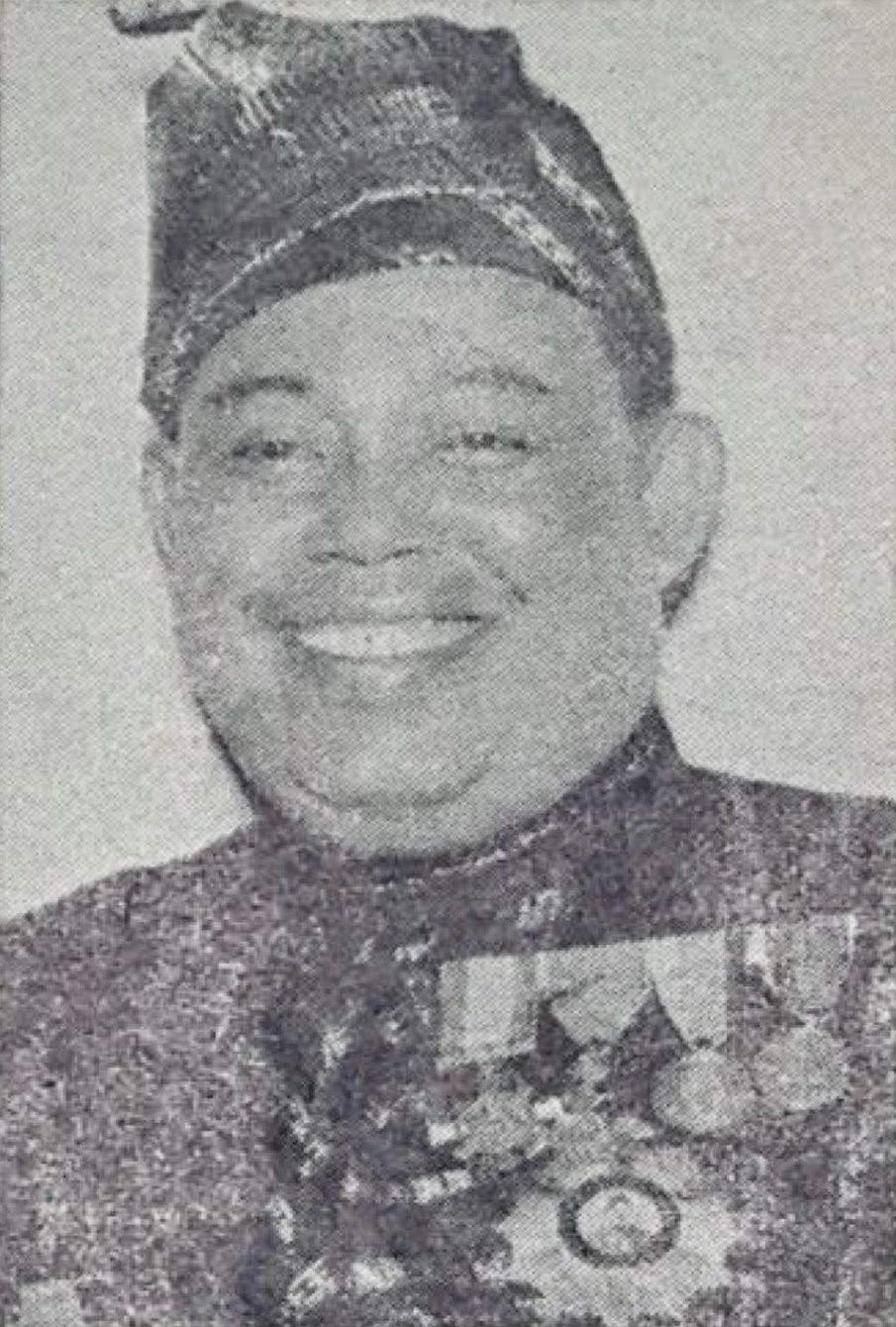
Pengiran Anak Mohamed Alam, c. 1966

Pengiran Anak Mohamed Alam and Pengiran Muhammad Yusuf represented the sultan of Brunei at the coronation of Yang Di-Pertuan Agong, Tuanku Ismail Nasiruddin Shah, in Kuala Lumpur on 10 April 1966. As the personal representative of the sultan, he officiated the opening of the Brunei Museum Exhibition at Dewan Kemasyarakatan on 22 May, where he delivered the sultan's speech welcoming the event. A royal betrothal ceremony was held on 23 August between Princess Nor'ain, the daughter of the sultan, and Pengiran Anak Mohammad Yusof, son of Pengiran Anak Mohamed Alam, at both Istana Darul Hana and his residence. Later that month, on 25 August, as the sultan departed Brunei for the United Kingdom, he assumed the role of deputy sultan, overseeing the administration in his absence.

After 17 years in power, Sultan Omar Ali Saifuddien III voluntarily abdicated on 4 October 1967, allowing his 21-year-old eldest son, Crown Prince Hassanal Bolkiah, to assume the throne. That night, Pengiran Anak Mohamed Alam announced the abdication on Radio Brunei. The following year, he was entrusted with organising the coronation ceremonies of Sultan Hassanal Bolkiah in 1968.

On 14 July 1971, Pengiran Anak Mohamed Alam was appointed speaker of the LegCo, a role he held until 30 November 1974. He announced the death of his sister, Paduka Suri Seri Begawan Raja Pengiran Anak Damit, on 13 September 1979. His tenure as chief of Adat Istiadat Negara concluded on 30 November 1981, when he was succeeded by his son, Pengiran Anak Mohammad Yusof.

On 14 December 1982, Pengiran Anak Mohamed Alam died at the age of 69 at his residence near Istana Darul Hana, Jalan Tutong. He was laid to rest at the Royal Mausoleum in Jalan Tutong.

== Personal life ==
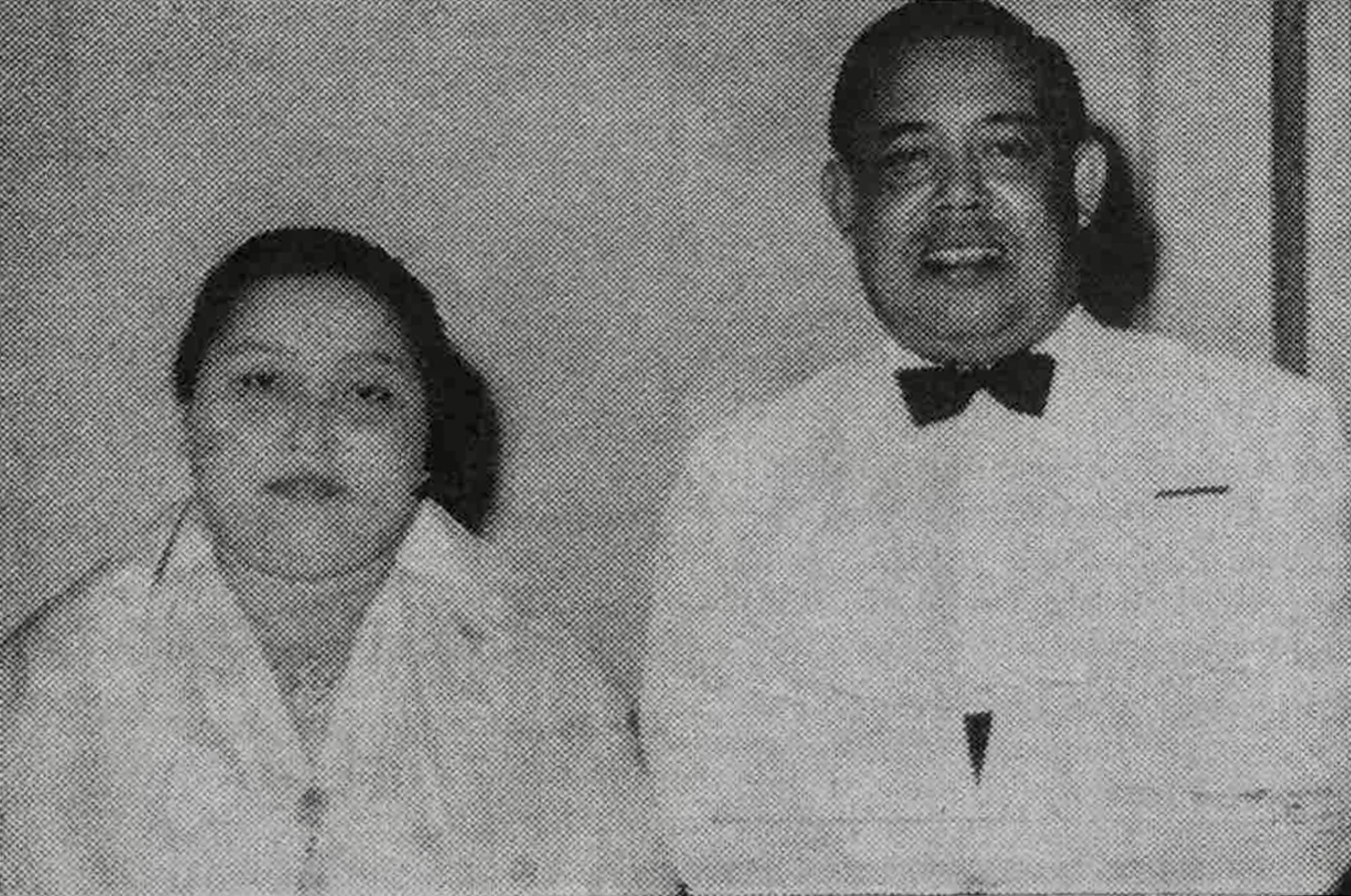
Pengiran Anak Besar (left) and Pengiran Anak Mohamed Alam (right) in 1965

Pengiran Anak Mohamed Alam married Pengiran Anak Besar in 1943, who later became known as Pengiran Babu Raja (Queen Mother). Together, they had nine children.

Their eldest son, Pengiran Anak Mohammad Yusof (24 June 1948 – 13 December 2004), was married to Princess Nor'ain. Another son, Pengiran Anak Puteh (born 19 January 1951), served as Brunei's ambassador to the United States and Japan, while Pengiran Anak Ja'afar became the executive chairman of Jati Transport.

Their eldest daughter, Pengiran Anak Saleha (born 7 October 1946), married Sultan Hassanal Bolkiah, making Pengiran Anak Mohamed Alam the father-in-law of the sultan and the brother-in-law of Sultan Omar Ali Saifuddien III. Another daughter, Pengiran Anak Zariah was married to Prince Mohamed Bolkiah.

Pengiran Anak Rokiah married Pangiran Anak Apong. Pengiran Anak Damit was married to Pangiran Haji Muhammad Ayub. Pengiran Anak Mastura (6 January 1960 – 26 July 2016) was married to Pengiran Haji Yura Perkasa, the son of Pengiran Muhammad Yusuf. The youngest of their children, Pengiran Anak Fatimah, completed the family.

== Titles, styles and honours ==
=== Titles and styles ===
Personal standard of Pengiran Pemancha Sahibul Rae' Wal Mashuarah

On 27 July 1950, Pengiran Anak Mohamed Alam was honoured by Sultan Omar Ali Saifuddien III with the wazir title of Pengiran Pemancha Sahibul Rae' Wal Mashuarah, (Note: After his death, the title was shortened to "Pengiran Pemancha." In English, the title translates to "Lord of Counsel." Pengiran Pemancha held the highest authority in matters of adat istiadat, customs, and state laws, and the authority to validate any action deemed necessary, should it be considered appropriate.) bearing the style Yang Teramat Mulia Seri Paduka. (Note: His full title is "Yang Teramat Mulia Seri Paduka Pengiran Pemancha Sahibul Rae' Wal-Mashuarah Pengiran Anak Haji Mohamed Alam ibni Pengiran Bendahara Pengiran Anak Abdul Rahman.")

=== Honours ===
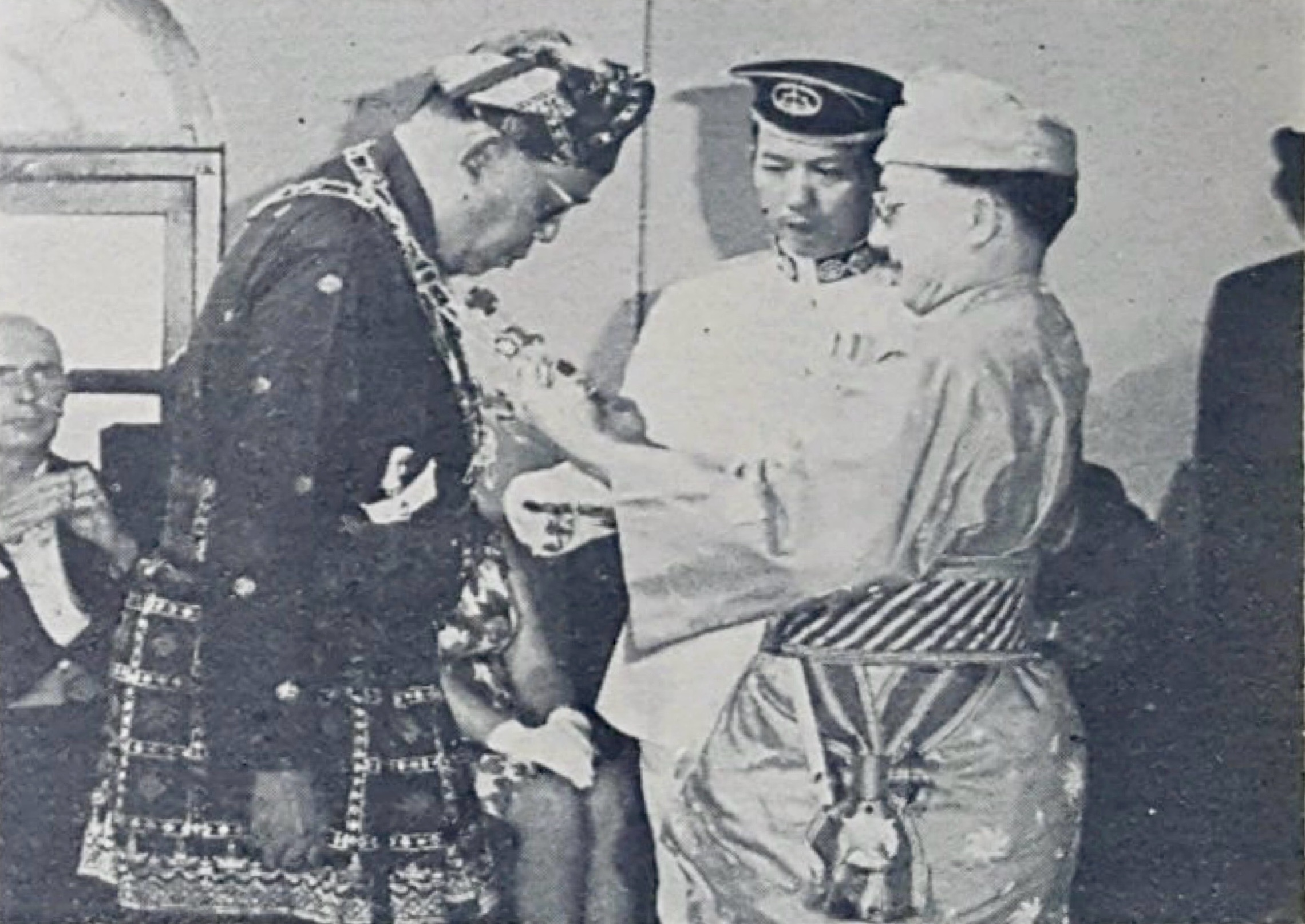
Pengiran Anak Mohamed Alam being awarded the DK by Sultan Omar Ali Saifuddien III in 1967

Pengiran Anak Mohamed Alam has been bestowed the following honours:

National

- Family Order of Laila Utama (DK; 23 September 1967) – Dato Laila Utama
- Order of Seri Paduka Mahkota Brunei First Class (SPMB; 23 September 1963) – Dato Seri Paduka
- Order of Seri Paduka Mahkota Brunei Second Class (DPMB; 23 September 1956) – Dato Paduka
- Order of Setia Negara Brunei Second Class (DSNB; 24 November 1960) – Dato Setia
- Sultan Hassanal Bolkiah Medal (PHBS)
- Omar Ali Saifuddin Medal (POAS)
- Meritorius Service Medal (PJK; 23 September 1959)
- Omar Ali Saifuddin Coronation Medal (31 May 1951)
- Coronation Medal (1 August 1968)
- Campaign Medal

Foreign

- Queen Elizabeth II Coronation Medal (2 June 1953)
- Honorary Officer of the Order of the British Empire (OBE; 1956)

=== Things named after him ===
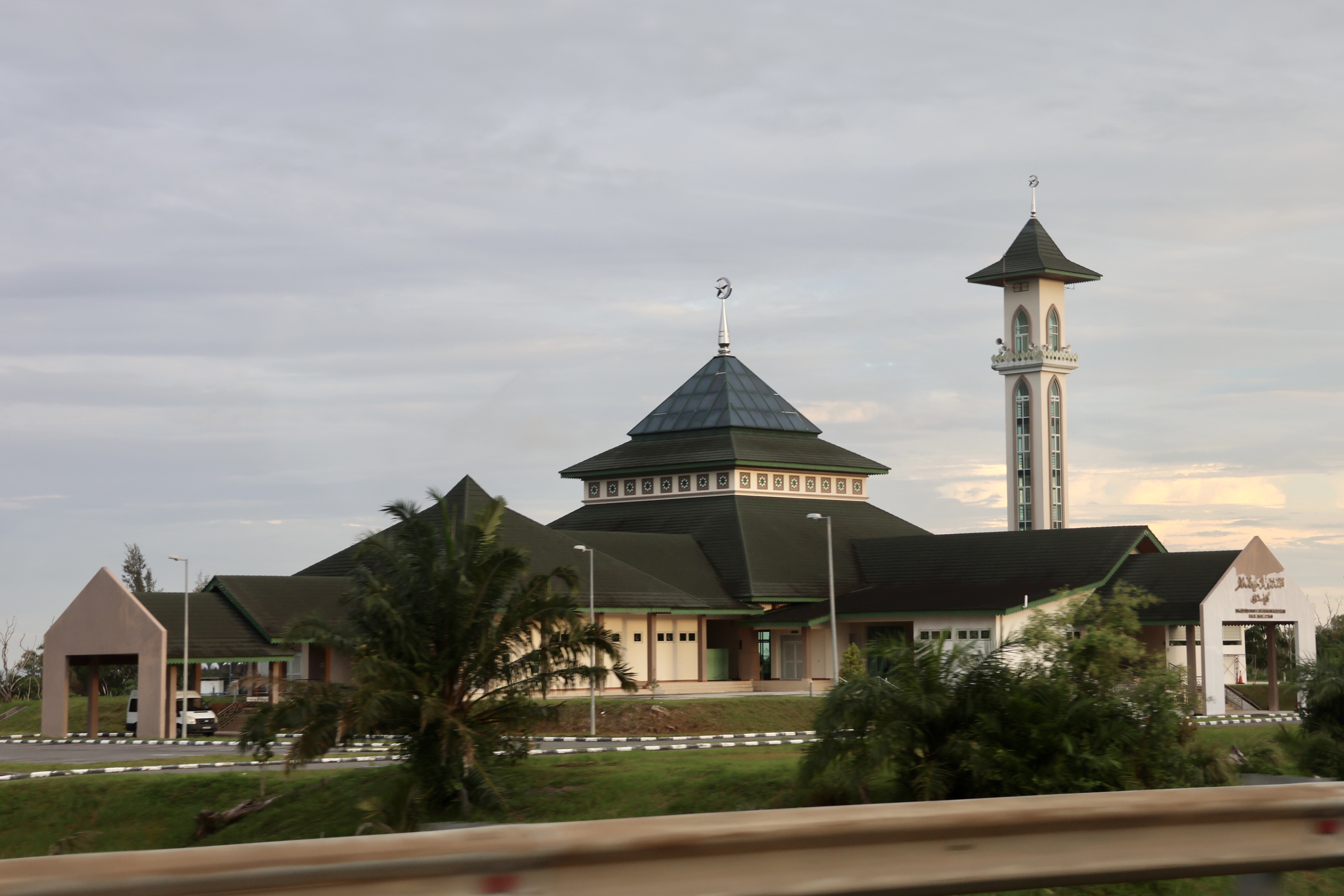
Pengiran Anak Haji Mohamed Alam Mosque

- Jalan Pemancha, a road in Bandar Seri Begawan.
- Jalan Pemancha, a road in Kuala Belait.
- Pengiran Anak Haji Mohamed Alam Mosque, mosque built in Kampong Sengkarai.
- Muhammad 'Alam Primary School, school in Seria.

== Sources ==
- Dewan Bahasa dan Pustaka Brunei (1968). Perpuspaan Ogos 1968 (in Malay).

Political offices
Preceded by Ibrahim Mohammad Jahfar	4th Speaker of the Legislative Council of Brunei; 14 July 1971 – 30 November 1974	Succeeded by Pengiran Abu Bakar
Preceded by Office established	1st Chief of Adat Istiadat Negara; 1 July 1954 – 30 November 1981	Succeeded by Pengiran Anak Mohammad Yusof
Regnal titles
Preceded by Pengiran Anak Muhammad Yasin	Pengiran Pemancha Sahibul Rae' Wal-Mashuarah; 1950–1982	Succeeded by vacant
