= Queen Saleha of Brunei =

Queen of Brunei since 1967

Saleha
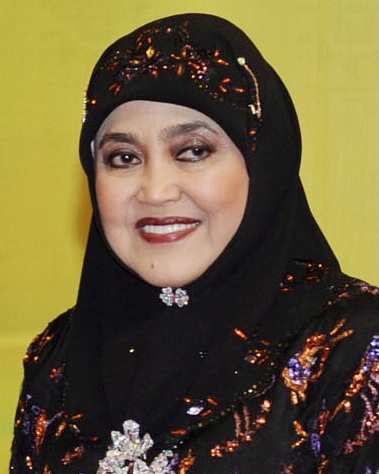
- Saleha in 2013

Queen consort of Brunei
- Tenure: 5 October 1967 – present
- Coronation: 1 August 1968
- Predecessor: Pengiran Anak Damit
- Born: Saleha binti Mohamed Alam; 7 October 1946 (age 80); Sumbiling, Brunei Town, British Protectorate of Brunei
- Spouse: Hassanal Bolkiah (m. 1965)
- Issue: Princess Rashidah; Princess Muta-Wakkilah; Crown Prince Al-Muhtadee Billah; Princess Majeedah; Princess Hafizah; Prince Abdul Malik
- House: Bolkiah
- Father: Mohamed Alam ibn Abdul Rahman
- Mother: Besar binti Metassan
- Religion: Sunni Islam

Saleha binti Mohamed Alam bin Abdul Rahman (born 7 October 1946) is Queen of Brunei as the wife of Sultan Hassanal Bolkiah.

== Early life and education ==
Queen Saleha was born on 7 October 1946 in Brunei Town to Pengiran Anak Mohamed Alam ibn Pengiran Anak Abdul Rahman and Pengiran Anak Besar binti Pengiran Anak Metassan. Saleha is the oldest of their nine children.

Saleha began her education privately at the school set up for the royal family at Istana Darul Hana. She later attended the Raja Isteri Girls' High School. After her marriage, she traveled with her husband to the United Kingdom so that he could attend Royal Military Academy Sandhurst. While there Saleha studied at Cygnets School and became fluent in English.

== Marriage and issue ==
On 29 July 1965, Saleha married Hassanal Bolkiah, then the Crown Prince of Brunei. The Akad Nikah ceremony was performed at Omar Ali Saifuddien Mosque with a celebration that evening at Istana Darul Hana. Three days of events followed with banquets at Istana Darul Hana and Istana Edinburgh.

Saleha's father, Pengiran Anak Mohammad Alam, and the sultan's mother, Queen Damit, were siblings making them first cousins. Two of her siblings also married the siblings of her husband. Her brother, Mohammad Yusof, married Princess Nor'ain in 1967 and her sister, Zariah, married Prince Mohamed Bolkiah in 1970.

Queen Saleha and Sultan Hassanal Bolkiah had two sons and four daughters. She lives together with her children and their families at Istana Nurul Iman.

- Princess Rashidah Sa'adatul (born 26 July 1969)
- Princess Muta-Wakkilah Hayatul (born 12 October 1971)
- Crown Prince Al-Muhtadee Billah (born 17 February 1974)
- Princess Majeedah Nuurul (born 16 March 1976)
- Princess Hafizah Sururul (born 12 March 1980)
- Prince Abdul Malik (born 30 June 1983)

The Sultan went on to marry Mariam Abdul Aziz in 1981 and Azrinaz Mazhar Hakim in 2005. He has four children from his second marriage and two children from his third. Both marriages ended in divorce so Saleha is the only wife he is still married to.

== Royal duties ==
Saleha serves as the patron of several organisations, such as the Brunei Darussalam Women's Council, Brunei Shell Women Association (PWBS), the Women Graduates' Association (PSW), the Women's Institute (WI), PERTIWI, PEKERTI, the Girl Guides Association of Brunei Darussalam, the Brunei Government Senior Officers Wives Welfare Association (BISTARI).

She also hosts the wives of heads of state, ambassadors, and other foreign dignitaries when they are in Brunei.

== Hobbies and interests ==
Saleha has a fish pond, a bird park, and a fruit garden because she enjoys the outdoors. Reading is one of her pastimes, in addition to playing traditional Bruneian games like pasang and congkak in addition to badminton.

== Titles, styles, and honours ==
Styles of Queen Saleha
- Reference style: Duli Yang Maha Mulia
- Alternative style: Her Majesty

=== Title and style ===
Brunei has a complex system of titles. Saleha's current style and title can be translated as Her Majesty Queen Saleha.

- 7 October 1946 – 29 July 1965: Yang Amat Mulia Pengiran Anak Saleha binti Pengiran Pemancha Pengiran Anak Mohamed Alam
- 29 July 1965 – 5 October 1967: Yang Teramat Mulia Duli Pengiran Isteri Anak Saleha binti Pengiran Pemancha Pengiran Anak Mohamed Alam
- 5 October 1967 – present: Kebawah Duli Yang Maha Mulia Paduka Seri Baginda Raja Isteri Pengiran Anak Saleha binti Almarhum Pengiran Pemancha Pengiran Anak Haji Mohamed Alam

=== Honours ===
==== National ====
- Royal Family Order of the Crown of Brunei (DKMB; 15 August 1982)
- Family Order of Laila Utama First Class (DK)
- Sultan Hassanal Bolkiah Medal (1 August 1968)
- Sultan of Brunei Silver Jubilee Medal (5 October 1992)
- Sultan of Brunei Golden Jubilee Medal (5 October 2017)
- Proclamation of Independence Medal (1 January 1984)

==== Foreign ====
- Indonesia:
  - 1st Class of the Star of Mahaputera
- Johor:
  - Recipient of the Royal Family Order of Johor (DK)
- Jordan:
  - Grand Cordon of the Supreme Order of the Renaissance (13 May 2008)
- Malaysia:
  - Honorary Recipient of the Order of the Crown of the Realm (19 August 2019)
- Kelantan:
  - Recipient of the Royal Family Order of Kelantan (DK; 7 March 1999)
- Netherlands:
  - Knight Grand Cross of the Order of the Netherlands Lion (21 January 2013)
- Selangor:
  - Recipient of the Royal Family Order of Selangor (DK)
- South Korea:
  - Member of the Grand Order of Mugunghwa
- Sweden:
  - Member of the Order of the Seraphim (8 February 2004)
- Thailand:
  - Dame Grand Cross of the Order of Chula Chom Klao (12 November 1988)
  - King Rama IX 60th Accession to the Throne Celebrations Medal (12 June 2006)
- Ukraine:
  - 1st Class of the Order of Princess Olga (8 March 2004)

== Issue ==
Name	Birth	Death	Marriage		Children
Name	Birth	Death	Date	Spouse	Children
Pengiran Anak Puteri Hajah Rashidah Sa'adatul Bolkiah	26 July 1969		15 August 1996	Pengiran Maharaja Setia Laila Di-Raja Sahibul Irshad Pengiran Anak Haji 'Abdul Rahim bin Pengiran Indera Mahkota Pengiran Anak Dr. Kemaluddin Al-Haj	Pengiran Anak Raheemah Sanaul Bolkiah
Pengiran Anak Puteri Hajah Rashidah Sa'adatul Bolkiah	26 July 1969		15 August 1996	Pengiran Maharaja Setia Laila Di-Raja Sahibul Irshad Pengiran Anak Haji 'Abdul Rahim bin Pengiran Indera Mahkota Pengiran Anak Dr. Kemaluddin Al-Haj	Pengiran Anak Hariisah Widadul Bolqiah
Pengiran Anak Puteri Hajah Rashidah Sa'adatul Bolkiah	26 July 1969		15 August 1996	Pengiran Maharaja Setia Laila Di-Raja Sahibul Irshad Pengiran Anak Haji 'Abdul Rahim bin Pengiran Indera Mahkota Pengiran Anak Dr. Kemaluddin Al-Haj	Pengiran Anak 'Abdul Raqiib
Pengiran Anak Puteri Hajah Rashidah Sa'adatul Bolkiah	26 July 1969		15 August 1996	Pengiran Maharaja Setia Laila Di-Raja Sahibul Irshad Pengiran Anak Haji 'Abdul Rahim bin Pengiran Indera Mahkota Pengiran Anak Dr. Kemaluddin Al-Haj	Pengiran Anak 'Abdul Haseeb
Pengiran Anak Puteri Hajah Rashidah Sa'adatul Bolkiah	26 July 1969		15 August 1996	Pengiran Maharaja Setia Laila Di-Raja Sahibul Irshad Pengiran Anak Haji 'Abdul Rahim bin Pengiran Indera Mahkota Pengiran Anak Dr. Kemaluddin Al-Haj	Pengiran Anak Raqeeqah Raayatul Bolqiah
Pengiran Anak Puteri Hajah Muta-Wakkilah Hayatul Bolkiah	12 October 1971		None		
Pengiran Muda Mahkota Pengiran Muda Haji Al-Muhtadee Billah	17 February 1974		9 September 2004	Pengiran Anak Isteri Pengiran Anak Sarah binti Pengiran Haji Salleh Ab-Rahaman	Pengiran Muda Abdul Muntaqim
Pengiran Muda Mahkota Pengiran Muda Haji Al-Muhtadee Billah	17 February 1974		9 September 2004	Pengiran Anak Isteri Pengiran Anak Sarah binti Pengiran Haji Salleh Ab-Rahaman	Pengiran Anak Muneerah Madhul Bolkiah
Pengiran Muda Mahkota Pengiran Muda Haji Al-Muhtadee Billah	17 February 1974		9 September 2004	Pengiran Anak Isteri Pengiran Anak Sarah binti Pengiran Haji Salleh Ab-Rahaman	Pengiran Muda Muhammad Aiman
Pengiran Muda Mahkota Pengiran Muda Haji Al-Muhtadee Billah	17 February 1974		9 September 2004	Pengiran Anak Isteri Pengiran Anak Sarah binti Pengiran Haji Salleh Ab-Rahaman	Pengiran Anak Faathimah Az-Zahraa Raihaanul Bolkiah
Pengiran Anak Puteri Hajah Majeedah Nuurul Bolkiah	16 March 1976		10 June 2007; Divorced 7 December 2023	Pengiran Khairul Khalil bin Pengiran Syed Haji Jaafari	Pengiran Anak 'Abdul Hafeez
Pengiran Anak Puteri Hajah Majeedah Nuurul Bolkiah	16 March 1976		10 June 2007; Divorced 7 December 2023	Pengiran Khairul Khalil bin Pengiran Syed Haji Jaafari	Pengiran Anak Raihaanah Hanaa-Ul Bolqiah
Pengiran Anak Puteri Hajah Hafizah Sururul Bolkiah	12 March 1980		20 September 2012	Pengiran Anak Haji Muhammad Ruzaini bin Pengiran Dr. Haji Mohammad Yakub	Pengiran Anak Muhammad Za'eem
Pengiran Anak Puteri Hajah Hafizah Sururul Bolkiah	12 March 1980		20 September 2012	Pengiran Anak Haji Muhammad Ruzaini bin Pengiran Dr. Haji Mohammad Yakub	Pengiran Anak Muhammad 'Aamir
Pengiran Anak Puteri Hajah Hafizah Sururul Bolkiah	12 March 1980		20 September 2012	Pengiran Anak Haji Muhammad Ruzaini bin Pengiran Dr. Haji Mohammad Yakub	Pengiran Anak 'Abdul Hakeem
Pengiran Anak Puteri Hajah Hafizah Sururul Bolkiah	12 March 1980		20 September 2012	Pengiran Anak Haji Muhammad Ruzaini bin Pengiran Dr. Haji Mohammad Yakub	Pengiran Anak 'Abdul Aleem
Pengiran Muda 'Abdul Malik	30 June 1983		9 April 2015	Pengiran Raabi'atul Adawiyyah binti Pengiran Haji Bolkiah	Pengiran Anak Muthee'ah Raayatul Bolqiah
Pengiran Muda 'Abdul Malik	30 June 1983		9 April 2015	Pengiran Raabi'atul Adawiyyah binti Pengiran Haji Bolkiah	Pengiran Anak Fathiyyah Rafaahul Bolqiah
Pengiran Muda 'Abdul Malik	30 June 1983		9 April 2015	Pengiran Raabi'atul Adawiyyah binti Pengiran Haji Bolkiah	Pengiran Anak Khaalishah Mishbaahul Bolqiah
Pengiran Muda 'Abdul Malik	30 June 1983		9 April 2015	Pengiran Raabi'atul Adawiyyah binti Pengiran Haji Bolkiah	Pengiran Anak Nabeelah Najmul Bolkiah

== See also ==
- Raja Isteri Pengiran Anak Saleha Hospital
- Raja Isteri Pengiran Anak Hajah Saleha Bridge
- Raja Isteri Pengiran Anak Saleha Secondary School

Queen Saleha of Brunei House of Bolkiah Born: 7 October 1947
Royal titles
Preceded by Pengiran Anak Damit	Queen consort of Brunei; 1967–present	Incumbent
