= Istana Darussalam =

Palace in Brunei

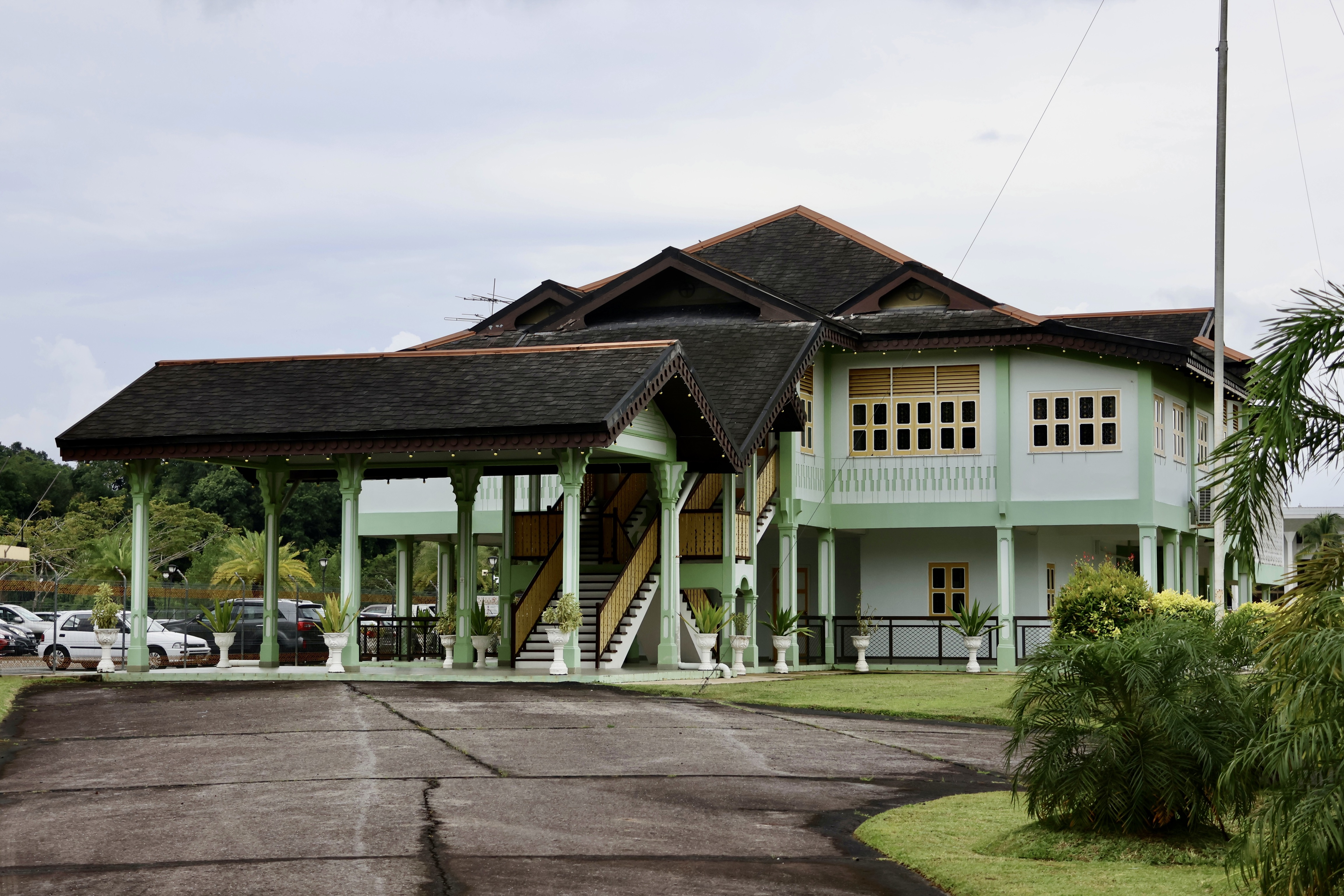
- Istana Darussalam in 2022
- Interactive map of the Istana Darussalam area

General information
- Type: Residence
- Architectural style: Malay vernacular architecture
- Location: Jalan Istana Darussalam, Kampong Sumbiling Lama, Bandar Seri Begawan, Brunei–Muara, Brunei
- Coordinates: 4.8920903°N 114.9371379°E
- Construction started: 1940s
- Completed: 1947; 79 years ago
- Cost: B$7,000

Technical details
- Material: concrete and wood
- Size: 0.76 acres (0.31 ha)

The Istana Darussalam (English: Darussalam Palace) is the former residence of Omar Ali Saifuddien III and birthplace of Sultan of Brunei, Hassanal Bolkiah. The palace is located at Jalan Darussalam, Kampong Sumbiling Lama, Brunei–Muara District, Brunei. The building has become a tourist attraction and currently under the protection of the Antiquities and Treasure Trove Act of the Museums Department.

== Design and construction ==
Istana Darussalam is located on the banks of the Kedayan River, is an illustration of the finest indigenous Malay structure of the time. It was first constructed from wood in 1947, and later, concrete was used to replace certain wooden pillars and beams. The structure is green and brown and has a distinctive Malay home architecture. The royal structure still stands in stunning contrast to the neighbourhood's collection of village homes. It covers an estimated area of 0.76 acres (0.31 ha) and cost approximately B$7,000 to build.

The royal entry from the Kedayan River to Istana Darussalam doorway is the Darussalam Jetty. It serves as a historical space to display and honour the history of the palace, one of the city's most significant landmarks and the site of the monarchy's past.

== History ==
The palace began construction in the 1940s. Several national festivities have taken place at this palace, including notably when Sultan Hassanal Bolkiah was born there on 15 July 1946, Prince Mohamed Bolkiah on 29 August 1948, and Princess Masna on 6 September 1948. In 1947, the lower part of the building was used as a private office by then Sultan Omar Ali. The royal family no longer uses the building, although every Friday, representatives of the Omar Ali Saifuddien Mosque hold the tahlil ritual there. When the royal family relocated from Istana Darussalam to Istana Darul Hana in 1951, Omar Ali's guests were temporarily housed there while he attended Malay College in Malaysia.

Pengiran Anak Damit, who was 55 years old, died at the Istana Darussalam on 13 September 1979, at 13:20. On 7 September 1986, Omar Ali died at the palace and later buried at Royal Mausoleum. The Public Works Department of the Ministry of Development currently maintains the palace, including several others with significant historical and cultural value.

== See also ==
- Politics of Brunei
- Bandar Seri Begawan
- Istana Nurul Iman
