= Pengiran Anak Muhammad Yasin =

Bruneian nobility (died 1951)

Yang Teramat Mulia Seri Paduka Pengiran Pemancha Sahibul Rae' Wal Mashuarah Pengiran Anak Muhammad Yasin ڤڠيرن انق محمد يسٓ OBE
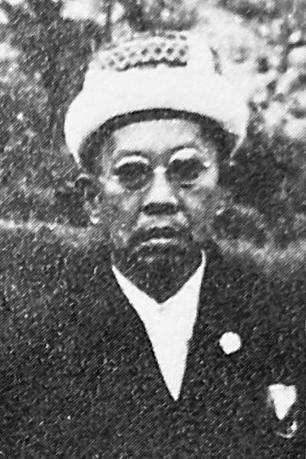
- Pengiran Anak Muhammad Yasin, c. 1948
- Died: 1951
- Burial place: Royal Mausoleum, Bandar Seri Begawan, Brunei
- Spouse: Pengiran Nor Alam
- Children: Pengiran Muda Abdul Kahar; Pengiran Anak Kemaluddin; Pengiran Ahmad
- Parents: Pengiran Tua Omar Ali (father); Pengiran Anak Tengah (mother)
- Relatives: Omar Ali Saifuddin II (great-grandfather); Pengiran Abu Bakar (brother-in-law); Pengiran Anak Abdul Rahim (grandson); Pengiran Anak Idris (grandson); Pengiran Anak Muhammad Bey Muntassir (grandson)

Pengiran Anak Muhammad Yasin bin Pengiran Tua Omar Ali (Note: The alternate spelling of his given name is "Pengiran Anak Mohamed Yassin" or "Pengiran Anak Mohammed Yasin" rather than "Pengiran Anak Muhammad Yasin," while his patronymic is written as "Pengiran Omarali" instead of "Pengiran Tua Omar Ali.) (died 1951) was a Bruneian nobleman who held the position of Pengiran Pemancha in Brunei. Serving from 1914 until 1950, and later becoming the Pengiran Bendahara from 1950 to 1951, these titles marked him as the third and first most senior rank within the wazir class of state officials respectively. He has served under the reign of Sultan Muhammad Jamalul Alam II, Ahmad Tajuddin and Omar Ali Saifuddien III.

He served as joint regent of Brunei alongside Pengiran Bendahara Pengiran Anak Abdul Rahman during Ahmad Tajuddin's minority from 11 September 1924 to 19 September 1931. The two were referred to as "the two wicked uncles" and were alleged to have exerted a negative influence on the young sultan. Accusations include impeding his overseas education, arranging a concubine for him at thirteen, and fostering such an atmosphere of fear that he cooked his own meals in soda water to avoid poisoning.

== Career ==
Pengiran Anak Muhammad Yasin was installed as the new Pengiran Pemancha in July 1914, in accordance with traditional adat customs. His appointment was marked by a formal ceremony attended by state noblemen. Significantly, the elderly Pengiran Anak Abdul Rahman was present to provide guidance on the correct ceremonial procedures, being the only individual who still remembered them in detail. The installation formed part of a broader revival of historic titles initiated by the sultan, a move that was met with widespread approval.

On 15 February 1919, during the presentation of a silver cup from the British Court of Directors to Sultan Muhammad Jamalul Alam II, Pengiran Anak Muhammad Yasin, together with Pengiran Anak Abdul Rahman, formally represented the sultan in a state capacity. They arrived with full ceremonial honours, including a black umbrella and sword bearer, in keeping with Bruneian custom. Pengiran Anak Muhammad Yasin took part in welcoming the British envoys, attended the State Council meeting at the Lapau Kajang, and was seated to the left of the sultan during the proceedings. After the sultan's address, Pengiran Anak Abdul Rahman delivered a speech of thanks on behalf of Brunei's chiefs and people. This was followed by an expression of agreement and additional gratitude from Pengiran Anak Muhammad Yasin, reinforcing the solemnity and decorum of the traditional state ceremony.

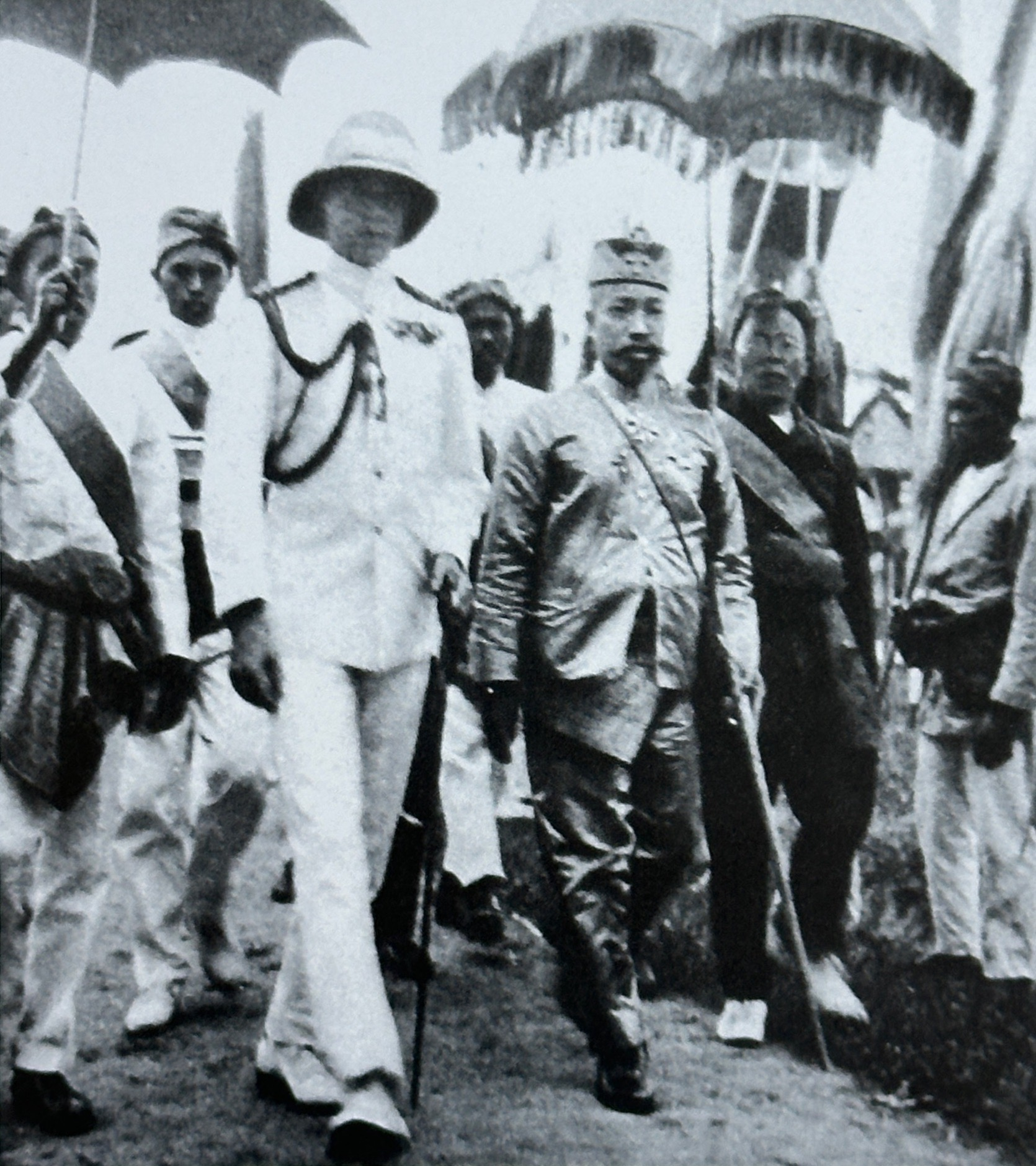
Prince of Wales (left) and Muhammad Jamalul Alam II (middle) in 1922

On 10 June 1921, Pengiran Anak Muhammad Yasin, together with Pengiran Anak Abdul Rahman, accompanied the sultan on a formal visit to Governor Sir Laurence Guillemard in Brunei, during the presentation of the sultan's honorary knighthood insignia. Following the death of Muhammad Jamalul Alam II on 19 September 1924, Pengiran Anak Muhammad Yasin was proclaimed joint regent alongside Pengiran Anak Abdul Rahman during the minority of the late sultan's 12-year-old son and heir, Ahmad Tajuddin. In this capacity, they jointly received F. Richards, Secretary to the High Commissioner for the Malay States and Brunei, during his official visit to the Lapau Kajang on 19 October 1925. Pengiran Anak Muhammad Yasin continued to fulfil his ceremonial and administrative duties, accompanying the young sultan on a visit to Labuan on 11 August 1927 and later receiving Sir Hugh Clifford during his official visit to Brunei in May 1928.

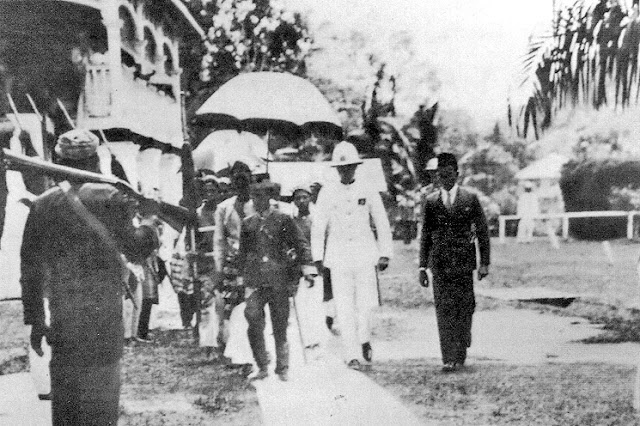
Ahmad Tajuddin and McKerron in 1930

On 19 September 1931, following Sultan Ahmad Tajuddin's assumption of full sovereignty, Pengiran Anak Muhammad Yasin took part in the official reception held at the Lapau in Brunei Town after the installation ceremony. He was among several distinguished figures present, including Pengiran Muda Omar Ali Saifuddien and the British Resident, Patrick McKerron. On 15 February 1932, he and Pengiran Anak Abdul Rahman attended a luncheon at Government House with Eric Ernest Falk Pretty, Thomas Carey, and other officials. Later that year, when the sultan departed for London to pursue his studies, both Pengiran Anak Muhammad Yasin and Pengiran Anak Abdul Rahman resumed their roles as joint regents, overseeing the affairs of state during the sultan's absence. On 4 August 1933, the two regents, along with Pengiran Muda Omar Ali Saifuddien, attended a formal dinner at Government House, joined by the sultan, Pengiran Anak Besar Bagol, and other British and local officials as part of a series of social functions for visiting dignitaries. In July 1936, Pengiran Anak Muhammad Yasin became the head of Persatuan Sahabat Pena Brunei, a non-political organisation founded before the Second World War to promote intellectual and social engagement. The association was one of several formed by educated youths surrounding the crown prince, Pengiran Muda Omar Ali Saifuddien.

On 17 March 1940, during the coronation of Ahmad Tajuddin, Pengiran Anak Muhammad Yasin played a key ceremonial role by presenting the plumed yellow crown to Pengiran Anak Abdul Rahman, who then placed it on the sultan's head—an act that symbolised the formal investiture of royal authority. Later that year, in September, both Pengiran Anak Abdul Rahman and Pengiran Anak Muhammad Yasin demonstrated their support for the regional war effort by each donating $10 to the Singaporean war fund. Following the country's liberation from the Japanese in 1945, only three official vehicles remained in Brunei. Of these, one was reserved for the sultan, while the other two were allocated to Pengiran Muda Omar Ali Saifuddien and Pengiran Anak Muhammad Yasin, underscoring their continued prominence and trusted positions in the state's post-war leadership.

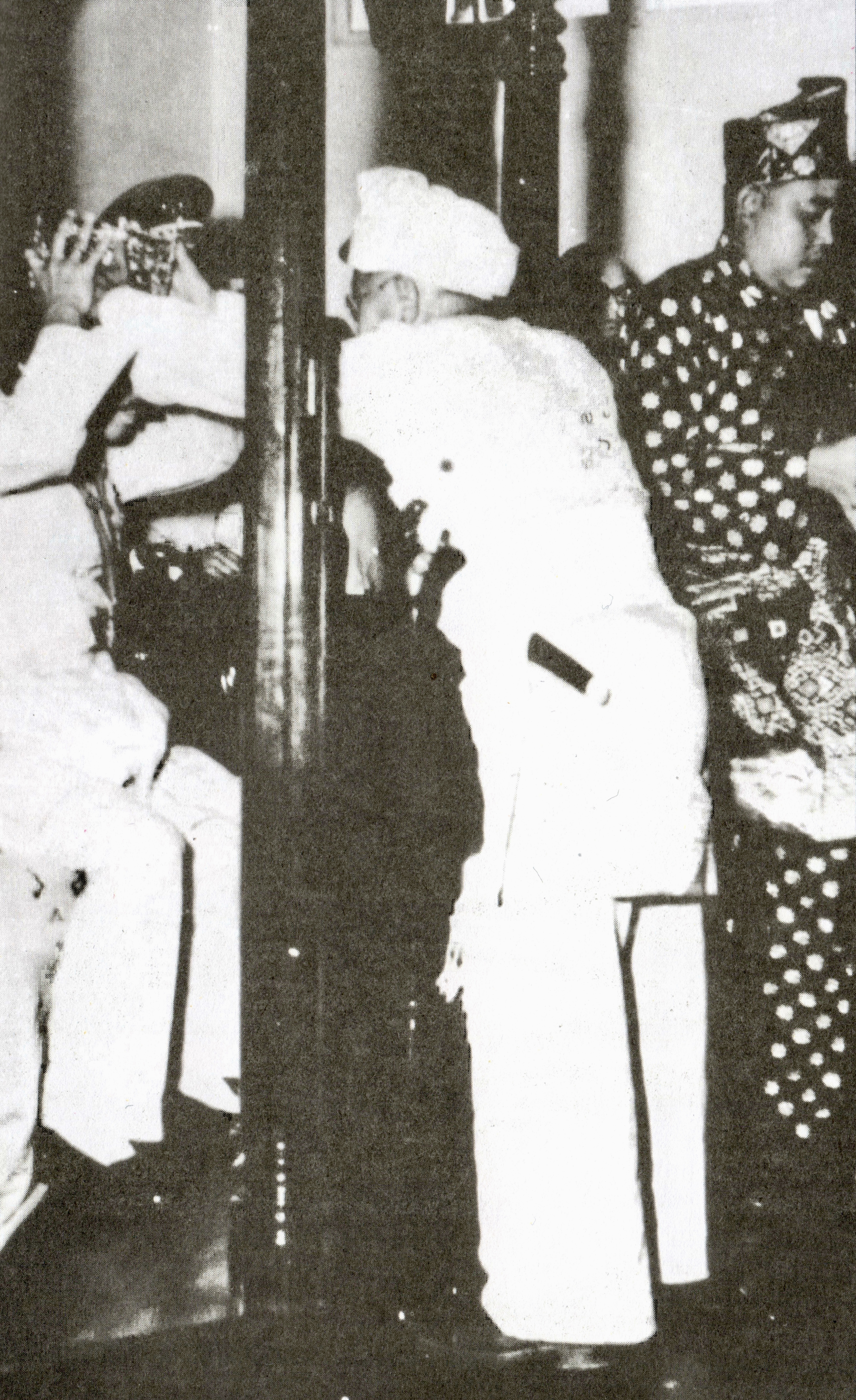
Pengiran Anak Muhammad Yasin crowning Omar Ali Saifuddien in 1950

On 6 June 1950, following the sudden death of Ahmad Tajuddin two days earlier—who had left no male heir—Pengiran Anak Muhammad Yasin formally proclaimed Omar Ali Saifuddien III as the new sultan of Brunei during a solemn ceremony at the Lapau. Less than a year later, on 31 May 1951, he played a central role in the coronation of the new monarch by placing the crown upon Sultan Omar Ali Saifuddien III's head, symbolising the formal commencement of his reign and reaffirming the continuity of Brunei's royal tradition. He died in 1951 and was later buried at the Royal Mausoleum in Brunei Town.

== Personal life ==
Pengiran Anak Muhammad Yasin was born into a noble family. His father, Pengiran Tua Omar Ali, was the son of Pengiran Pemancha Pengiran Anak Muhammad Salleh I, while his mother, Pengiran Babu Raja Pengiran Anak Tengah, was the daughter of Pengiran Maharaja Lela Pengiran Anak Abdul Kahar. His paternal great-grandfather was Sultan Omar Ali Saifuddin II. Pengiran Anak Muhammad Yasin later married Pengiran Nor Alam, (Note: During the Japanese occupation, his wife was an active member of the Brunei Malay Women's Association, which focused on improving women's welfare, particularly in education.) and together they had several children.

Among his children was Pengiran Muda Abdul Kahar, a civil servant who chaired the Tujuh Serangkai ("seven branches") committee from 1953 to 1954. Another son, Pengiran Anak Kemaluddin, served as Brunei's state religious affairs officer from 1962 to 1970. He later became the speaker of the Legislative Council of Brunei (LegCo), holding the position from 1981 to 1984 and again from 2004 to 2011. Another son, Pengiran Ahmad, was a member of the cheteria, a noble class in Brunei.

Pengiran Anak Muhammad Yasin was the brother-in-law of Sultan Muhammad Jamalul Alam II through his sister, Pengiran Anak Siti Fatimah, who became the raja isteri (queen consort) to the sultan.

== Titles, styles and honours ==
=== Titles and styles ===
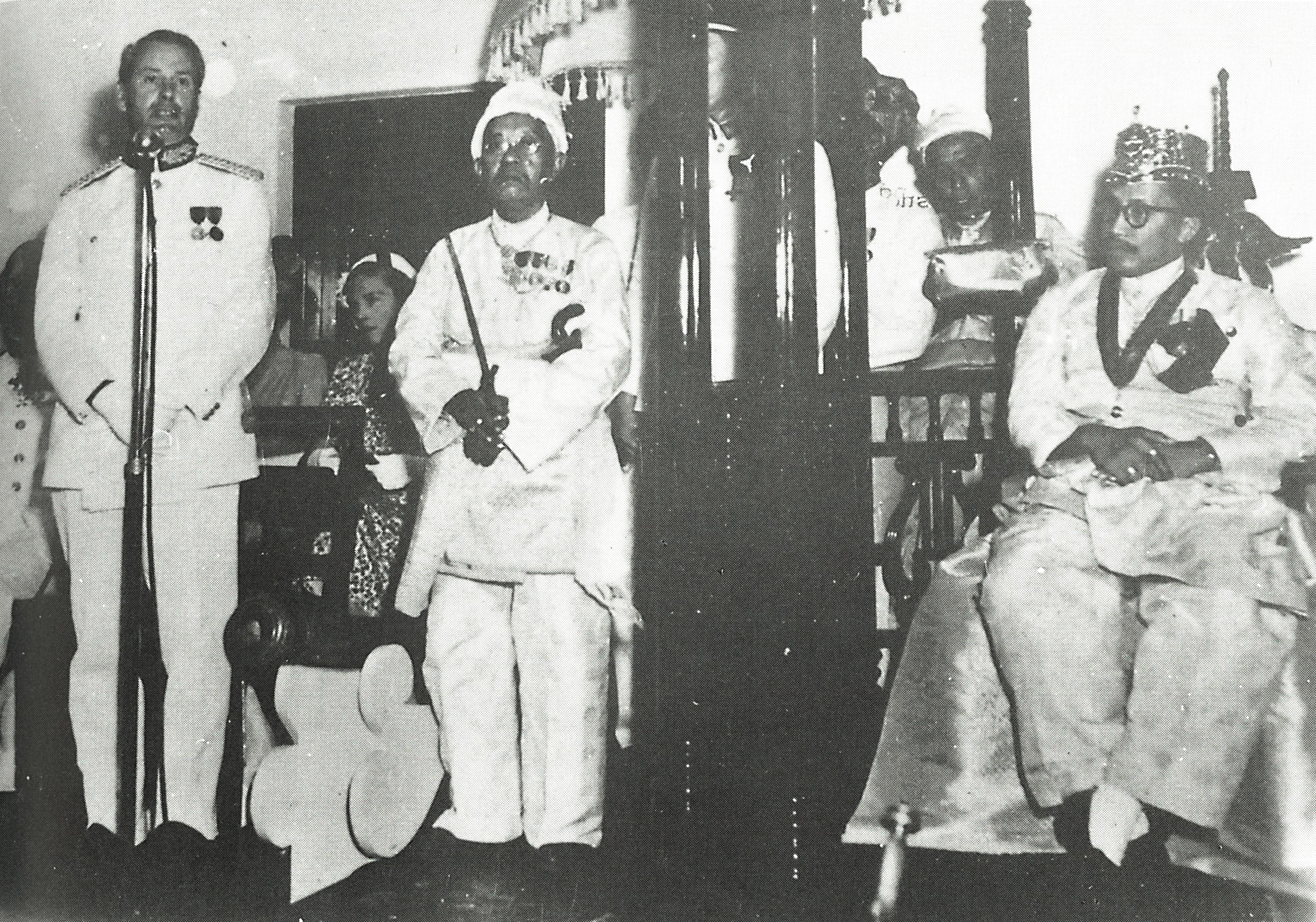
Pengiran Anak Muhammad Yasin (centre) is seen wearing his ceremonial uniform during the coronation of Omar Ali Saifuddien III in 1951

In July 1914, Pengiran Anak Muhammad Yasin was honoured by Muhammad Jamalul Alam II with the wazir title of Pengiran Pemancha Sahibul Rae' Wal Mashuarah. (Note: After his death, the title was shortened to "Pengiran Pemancha." In English, the title translates to "Lord of Counsel." Pengiran Pemancha held the highest authority in matters of adat istiadat, customs, and state laws, and the authority to validate any action deemed necessary, should it be considered appropriate.) He was later elevated to the title of Pengiran Bendahara in 1950. (Note: After his death, the title was shortened to "Pengiran Bendahara." In English, the title translates to "Prime Minister." Pengiran Bendahara held the highest authority in matters of governance, the judiciary, and Islamic affairs, serving as regent in the sultan's absence.) Each of these titles carries the style Yang Teramat Mulia Seri Paduka.

=== Honours ===
Pengiran Anak Muhammad Yasin has been bestowed the following honours:

- Honorary Officer of the Order of the British Empire (OBE; 1951)
- Omar Ali Saifuddin Coronation Medal (31 May 1951)
- King George VI Coronation Medal (1937)
- King George V Silver Jubilee Medal (1935)

== Notes ==
Regnal titles
Preceded by Pengiran Anak Muhammad Salleh	Pengiran Pemancha Sahibul Rae' Wal-Mashuarah; 1914–1950	Succeeded by Pengiran Anak Mohamed Alam
Preceded by Omar Ali Saifuddien III	Pengiran Bendahara Seri Maharaja Permaisuara; 1950–1951	Succeeded by Pengiran Muda Hashim
