= Pengiran Muda Abdul Kahar =

Bruneian nobility (1922–1957)

Yang Amat Mulia Pengiran Maharaja Lela Pengiran Muda Abdul Kahar ڤڠيرن مودا عبدالكهار SMB
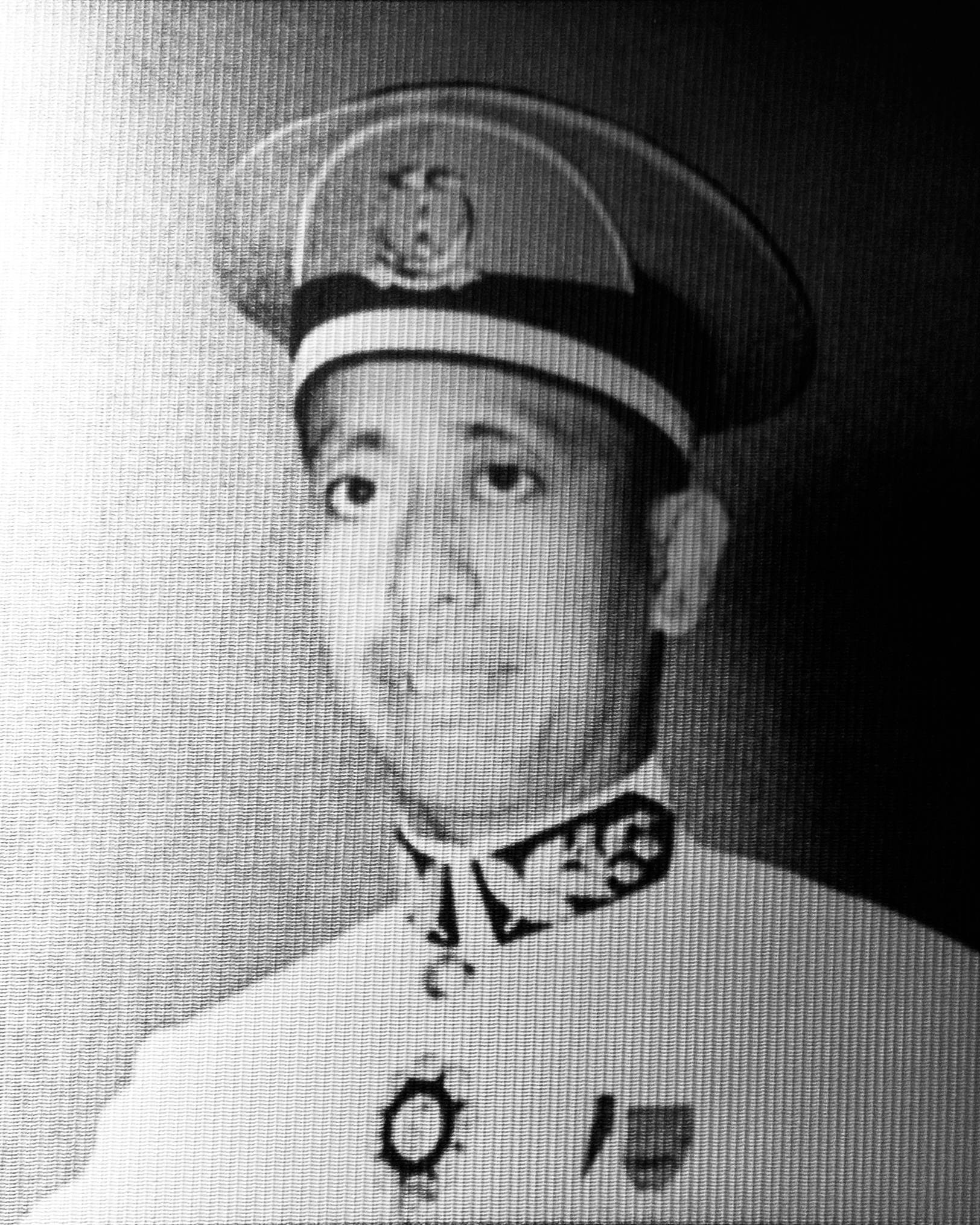
- Pengiran Muda Abdul Kahar prior to 1957
- Born: Pengiran Anak Abdul Kahar bin Pengiran Anak Muhammad Yassin; 1922; Kampong Sumbiling Lama, Brunei Town, Brunei
- Died: 16 April 1957 (aged 34–35); Singapore General Hospital, Singapore
- Known for: Chairman of Tujuh Serangkai committee from 1953 to 1954
- Children: Pengiran Anak Idris; Pengiran Ahmad Mahdi Al-Sufri; Pengiran Hairani
- Parents: Pengiran Anak Muhammad Yasin (father); Pengiran Nor Alam (mother)
- Relatives: Pengiran Anak Kemaluddin (brother); Pengiran Anak Abdul Rahim (nephew); Pengiran Anak Muhammad Bey Muntassir (nephew); Dayangku Najibah Eradah (granddaughter)

Pengiran Muda Abdul Kahar (1922 – 16 April 1957) was a nobleman and civil servant from Brunei who served as the chairman of the Tujuh Serangkai ("seven branches") committee from 1953 to 1954, tasked with gathering the perspectives of Bruneian citizens, both rural and urban, on the proposed Constitution of Brunei, compiling a comprehensive report, and advising Sultan Omar Ali Saifuddien III during its drafting. Additionally, he was the appointed head of the Cheteria from 1951 to 1957.

== Early life and education ==
Born in 1922 in Kampong Sumbiling Lama of Brunei Town as Pengiran Anak Abdul Kahar, he was the son of a nobleman named Pengiran Bendahara Pengiran Anak Muhammad Yasin bin Pengiran Tua Omar Ali. He has a brother named Pengiran Anak Kemaluddin.

He received his early education at the palace, and attended the Labuan English School, to become the first Bruneian to pass the Senior Cambridge Examination. From 1932 to 1936, Prince Omar Ali Saifuddien, who was eighteen at the time, enrolled in the Malay College Kuala Kangsar in Perak, British Malaya, along with two of his cousins, Pengiran Anak Mohamed Alam and Pengiran Anak Abdul Kahar.

== Career ==
The Tujuh Serangkai, a committee that was formed by the Sultan in July 1953 to collect popular opinion throughout the nation, was the first step in drafting Brunei's codified constitution. The seven appointees, including Wazirs, Cheteria, Manteri and State Council members, were assigned to provide advice on the writing of the Constitution, the establishment of district councils, and the reformation of the State Council. The committee, led by Pengiran Muda Abdul Kahar, summarised public comments and constitutional analysis in a 50-page report that was submitted on 23 March 1954. The report was surprisingly well received by the authorities. He later worked as a civil servant as the deputy collector of land revenue, and a member of the Land Committee in 1957.

== Death and funeral ==
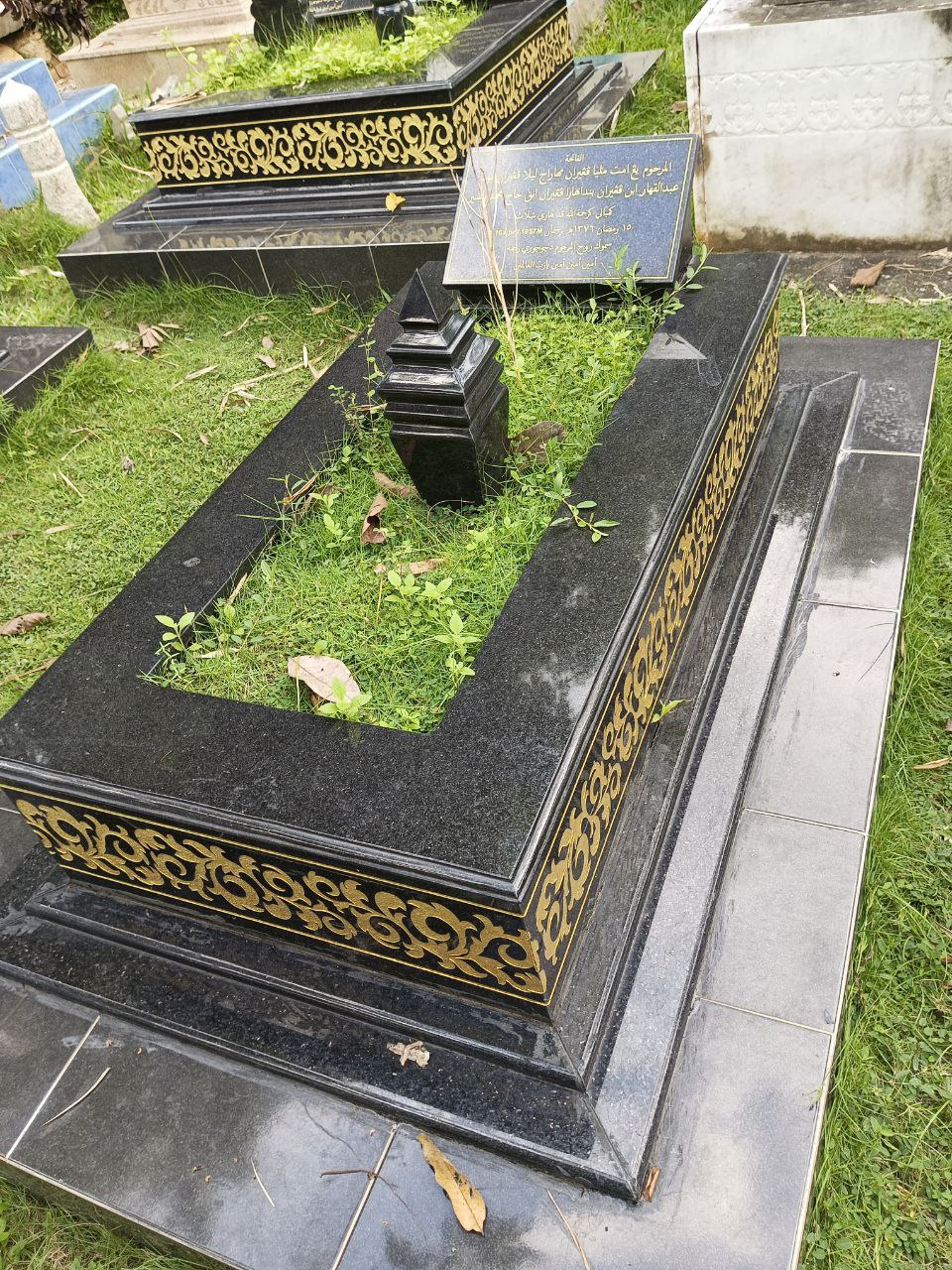
Grave of Pengiran Muda Abdul Kahar at the Royal Mausoleum Jalan Tutong

Pengiran Muda Abdul Kahar became unwell on 15 April 1957, while on holiday in Singapore with his family. He was brought to the Singapore General Hospital that same evening and died the next evening, 16 April 1957, at the age of 35. As soon as Brunei learned of his passing, the Sultan commanded that the national flag be flown at half mast, and it would stay that way until his remains were interred. In order to return his body to Brunei, his younger brother Pengiran Anak Kamaluddin, Pehin Orang Kaya Di-Gadong, and Pehin Khatib Haji Alihussain boarded an aircraft on Wednesday, 17 April.

The Persekutuan Seruan Islam se-Malaya's Singapore Branch, in collaboration with the Chief Kathi of Singapore, Tuan Haji Ali, and a number of Bruneians who were in Singapore at the time, including Pengiran Anak Kamaluddin, Pehin Orang Kaya Di-Gadong, and Pehin Khatib Haji Alihussain, handled the logistics of moving and preserving his body. On 17 April, at 7:30 a.m., a Malayan Airways aircraft transported his remains from the Singapore International Airport and touched down in Brunei Airport at 12:52 p.m. Before he left, a number of individuals paid their respects to his remains, including Abdul Aziz (representing William Goode), Burhanuddin al-Helmy, Abdul Hamid Jumat's wife, and representatives of the United Malay National Organisation.

The remains have been transported to Brunei by his children, his brother, Pehin Orang Kaya Di-Gadong, and Pehin Khatib Haji Alihussain. John Orman Gilbert; Pengiran Muda Hashim and Pengiran Anak Mohamed Alam; members of the Royal Family; government officials; members of the State Council and Partai Rakyat Brunei; dignitaries from various nations; representatives from Kuala Belait and Seria; and others were among the approximately two thousand people who had gathered in various locations when the plane touched down at the airport.

Following the Sultan's visit to his corpse, two motor perahu bearing the names "Sultan" and "Awang Semaun" transported him, together with state dignitaries, to the Royal Mausoleum in line with state customs. Prayers were led by Kathi Besar Pengiran Muhammad Salleh after his body was placed to rest. After 4 p.m., the funeral was over.

== Personal life ==
Pengiran Muda Abdul Kahar was married, and together they have three children.

- Pengiran Anak Haji Idris (born January 1948), married to Princess Amal Umi Kalthum Al-Islam in 1972.
- Pengiran Haji Ahmad Mahdi Al-Sufri, father of Dayangku Najibah Eradah.
- Pengiran Datin Paduka Hajah Hairani

== Titles, styles and honours ==
=== Titles and styles ===
Pengiran Muda Abdul Kahar was bestowed by Sultan Omar Ali Saifuddien III the noble title of Yang Amat Mulia Pengiran Maharaja Lela Sahibul Kahar on 9 May 1951, styled as Yang Amat Mulia. With this appointment, he rose to the top of the Cheteria aristocratic hierarchy and became head of the group, ranking only behind the Wazirs.

=== Honours ===
- Order of Seri Paduka Mahkota Brunei Third Class (SMB)
- Omar Ali Saifuddin Coronation Medal (31 May 1951)

=== Things named after him ===
- Jalan Maharaja Lela, a road in Kuala Belait
