= Royal Mausoleum (Brunei) =

Mausoleum of the sultans of Brunei

- Kubah Makam Diraja (Malay) كوبه مقام دراج (Jawi)
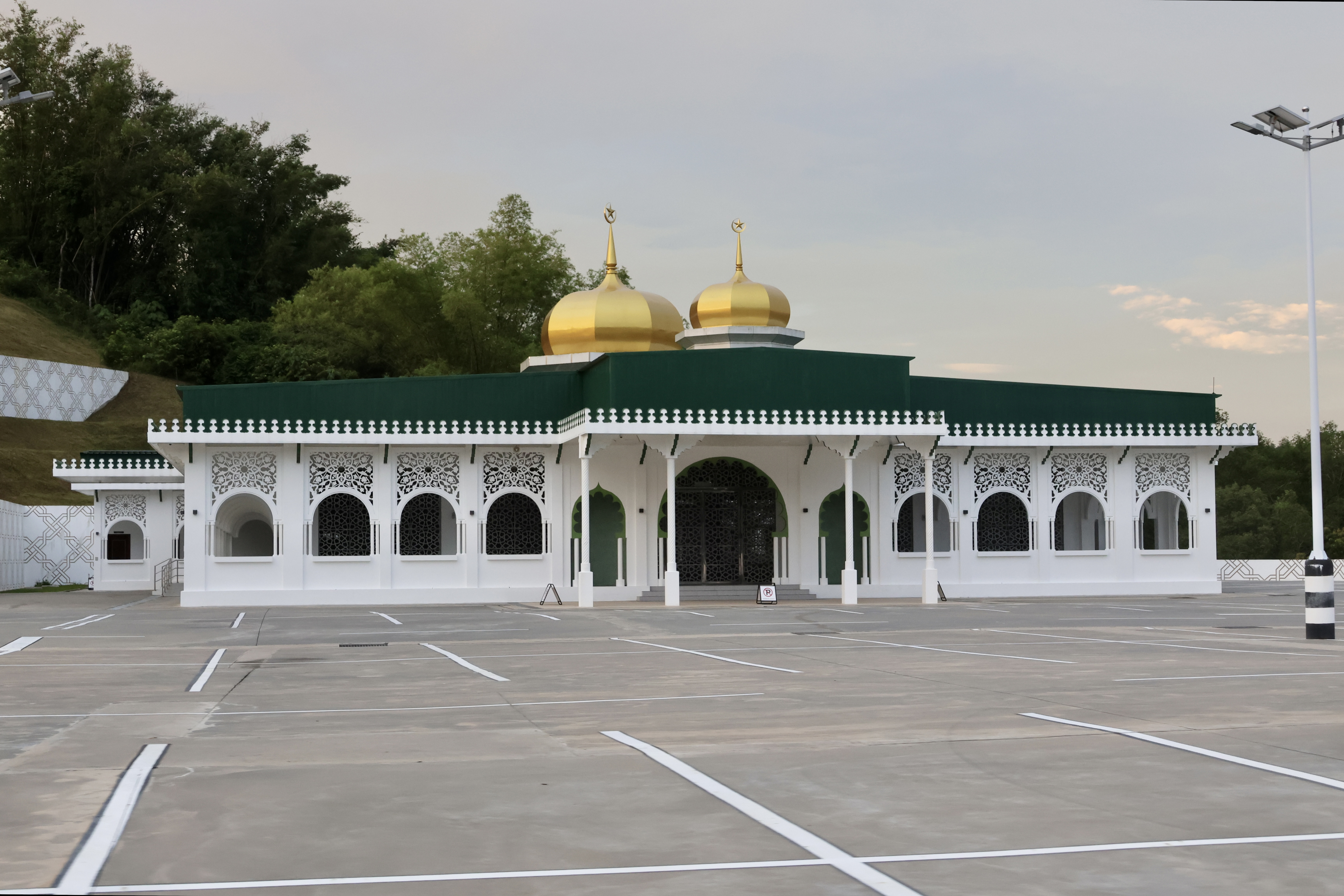
- The mausoleum in 2023

Religion
- Affiliation: Islam
- Branch/tradition: Sunni
- Ownership: Government of Brunei

Location
- Location: Batu Satu, Bandar Seri Begawan, Brunei
- Interactive map of Royal Mausoleum
- Coordinates: 4°53′08″N 114°56′04″E

Architecture
- Type: Mausoleum
- Style: Islamic architecture

The Royal Mausoleum (Malay: Kubah Makam Diraja) in Batu Satu, Bandar Seri Begawan, is a significant historical and cultural landmark in Brunei. Located along the Brunei River, it lies beyond Kampong Ayer and on the route from Bandar Seri Begawan to the Istana Nurul Iman. This site serves as the final resting place for several Bruneian sultans and members of the royal family, with Sultan Omar Ali Saifuddin I, who died in 1795, being the first monarch interred here.

Although the mausoleum holds immense significance in Brunei's monarchical history—particularly during the 19th and 20th centuries—and in its interactions with the British, it remains relatively off the main tourist trail and is less visited by foreign tourists. Despite this, it is a notable destination for domestic visitors, offering a peaceful setting with ample parking and a refreshment shop for convenience.

== Notable burials ==
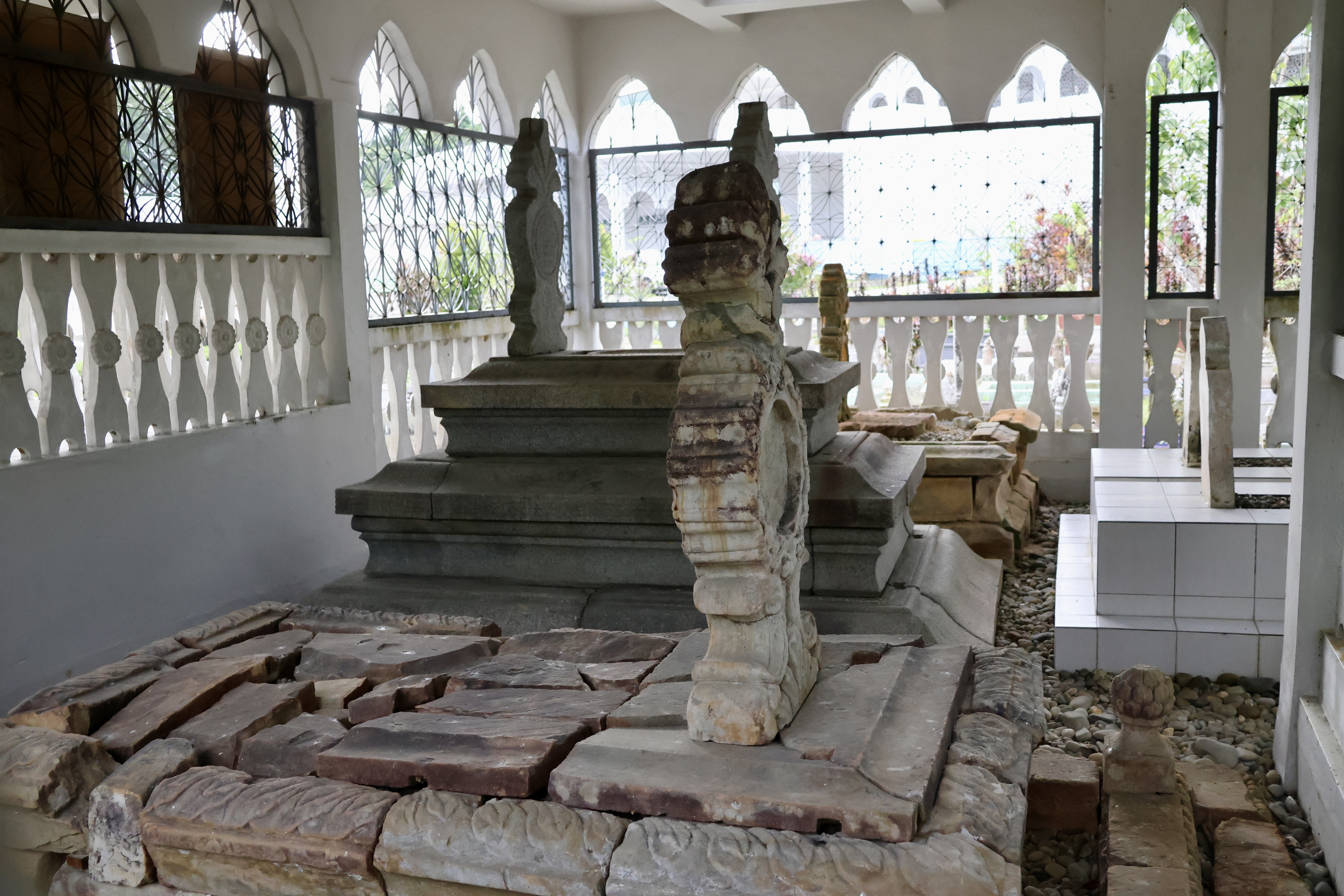
Tombs of Muhammad Tajuddin, Pengiran Anak Khadijah and Omar Ali Saifuddin II in 2024

The graves of several Brunei sultans are designated as ancient monuments and historical sites under the Antiquities and Treasure Trove (Ancient Monuments and Historical Sites) Order, 2007. Sultan Omar Ali Saifuddin I is among the earliest recognised rulers, buried at Makam Besar, Makam Diraja. Other sultans interred at Makam Damit, Makam Diraja include Sultan Muhammad Tajuddin, Sultan Muhammad Kanzul Alam, Sultan Muhammad Jamalul Alam I, and Sultan Omar Ali Saifuddin II. Later monarchs are buried inside the mausoleum, such as Sultan Hashim Jalilul Alam Aqamaddin, Sultan Muhammad Jamalul Alam II, Sultan Ahmad Tajuddin, and Sultan Omar Ali Saifuddien III. Meanwhile, the alleged tomb of Sultan Abdul Momin is not gazetted in the order.

=== Inside the mausoleum ===
- Pengiran Anak Siti Fatimah (died 1947), consort to Muhammad Jamalul Alam II
- Pengiran Anak Damit (1924–1979), consort to Omar Ali Saifuddien III
- Pengiran Muda Abdul Azim (1982–2020), son of Hassanal Bolkiah
- Pengiran Anak Besar (1928–2016), Pengiran Babu Raja until 2016
- Pengiran Muda Hashim bin Abdul Rahman (1907–1998), Pengiran Bendahara from 1952 to 1977
- Pengiran Anak Mohamed Alam (1918–1982), legislative speaker from 1971 to 1974
- Pengiran Mohammad bin Abdul Rahman Piut (1906–1976), Pengiran Temenggong from 1971 to 1976
- Pengiran Anak Mohammad Yusof (1948–2004), chief of Adat Istiadat Negara from 1981 to 2000
- Pengiran Anak Muhammad Bey Muntassir (1956–2009), Pengiran Sura Negara from 1981 to 2009

=== Outside the mausoleum ===
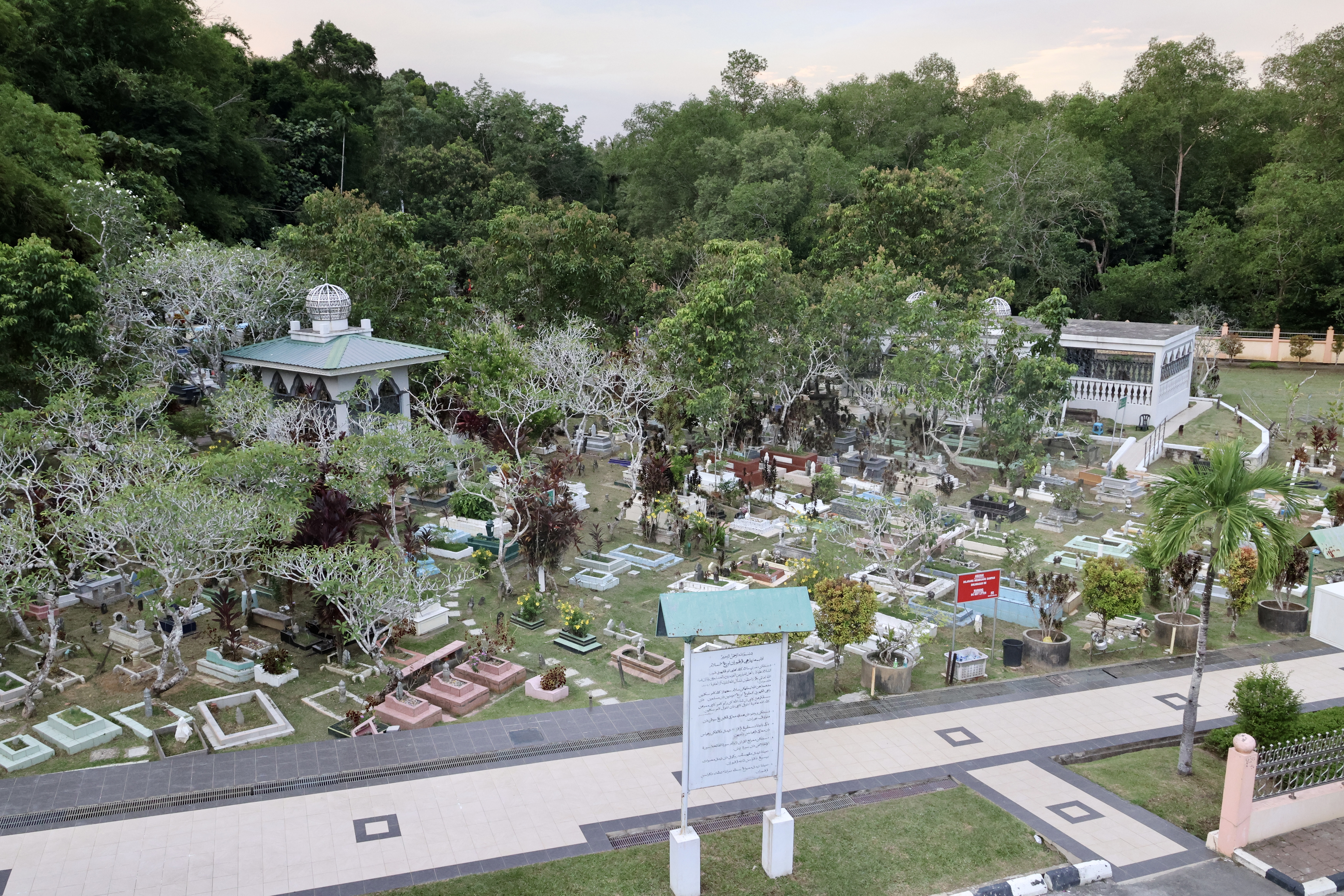
Outdoor burial ground in 2023

- Pengiran Chendera Kesuma (died 1862), consort to Hashim Jalilul Alam Aqamaddin
- Pengiran Anak Khadijah (died 1875), consort to Abdul Momin
- Pengiran Anak Muhammad Yasin (died 1951), Pengiran Bendahara from 1950 to 1951.
- Pengiran Anak Safar (died 1964), member of Privy Council
- Pengiran Anak Khamis (died 1986), Pengiran Di-Gadong from 1971 to 1986
- Pengiran Muhammad Salleh (1890–1969), Pengiran Di-Gadong from 1968 to 1969
- Pengiran Abu Bakar bin Salleh (1907–1974), legislative speaker from 1959 to 1962
- Ismail Omar Abdul Aziz (1911–1994), State Mufti of Brunei
- Besar Sagap (1914–1988), composer of Allah Peliharakan Sultan
- Pengiran Muda Abdul Kahar (1922–1957), member of Tujuh Serangkai
- Pengiran Jaya (1925–2009), commissioner of police from 1975 to 1983
- Pengiran Anak Siti Saerah (1928–2013), daughter of Sultan Ahmad Tajuddin
- Pengiran Anak Kemaluddin Al-Haj (1929–2012), legislative speaker from 1971 to 1974
- Pengiran Anak Abdul Wahab (1930–2017), member of Privy Council

== Gallery ==
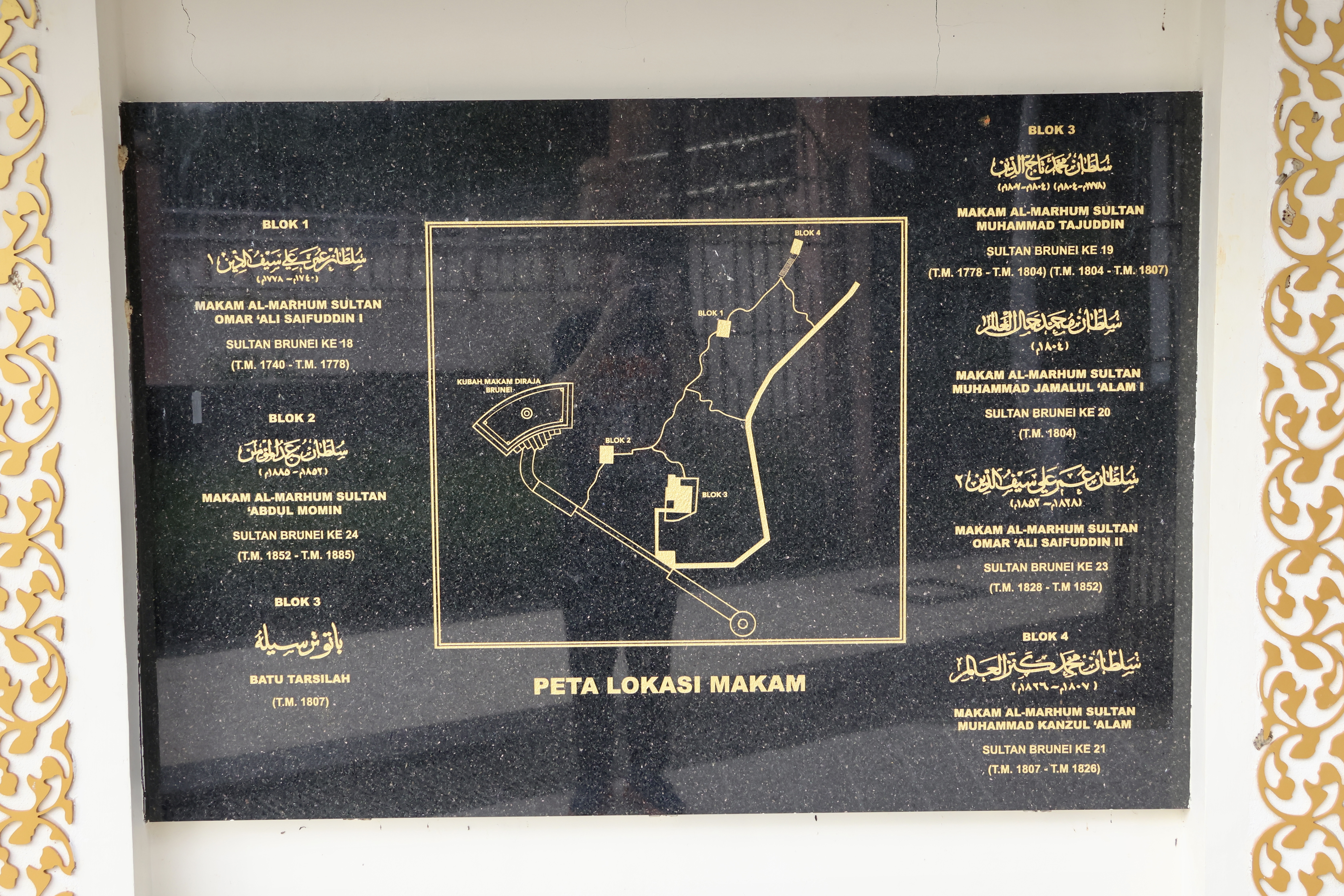
Layout of the burial ground

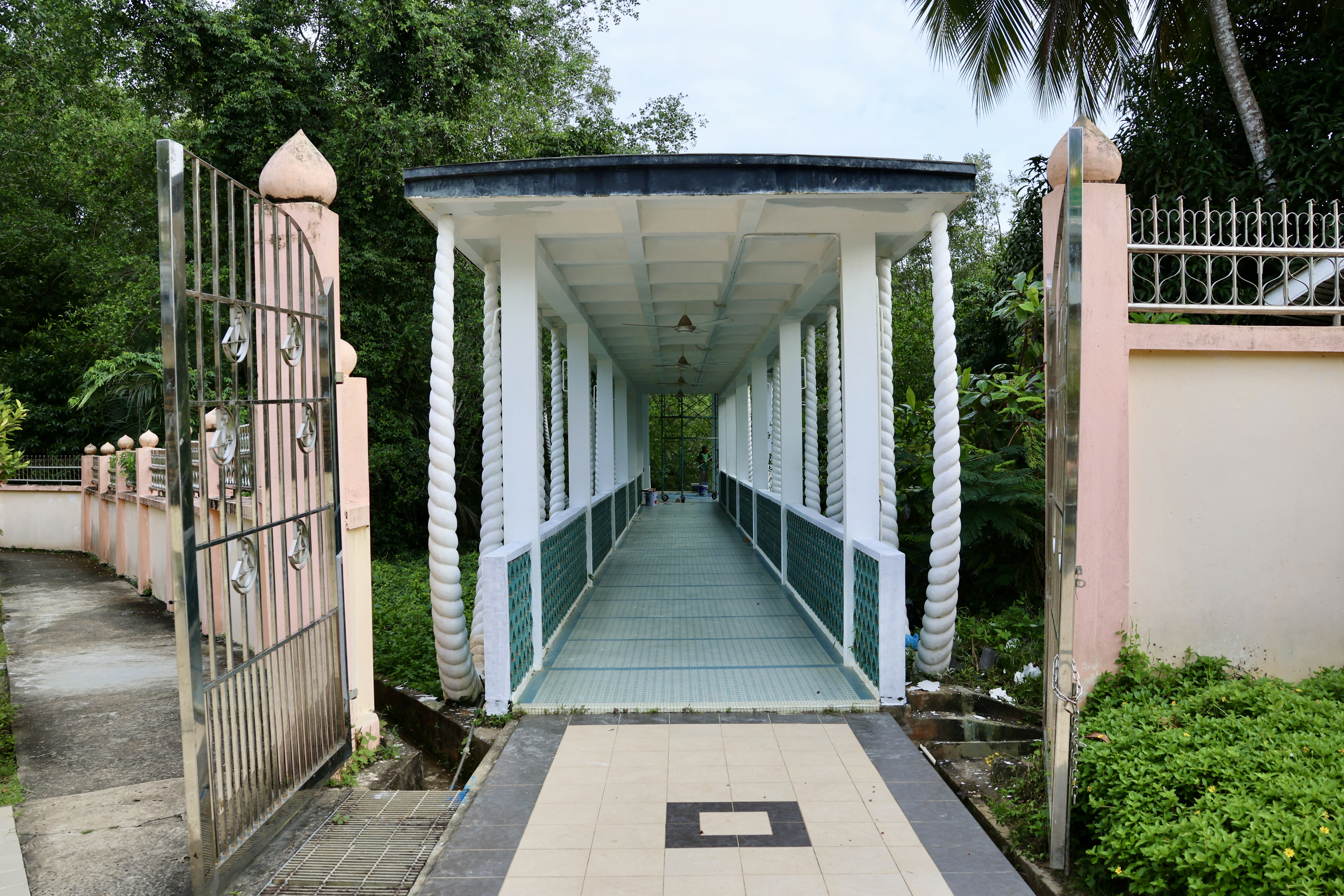
Mausoleum's jetty

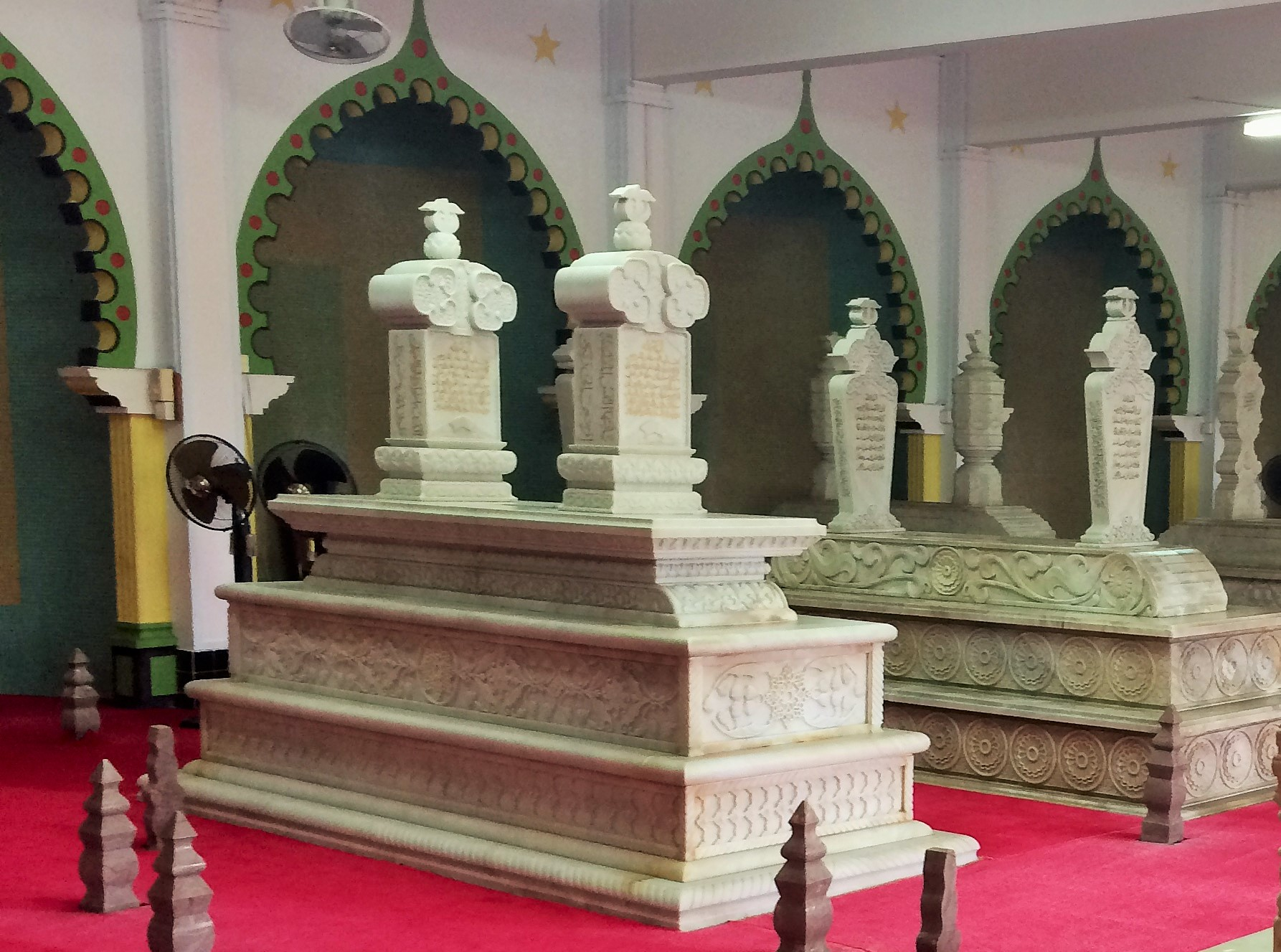
Interior of the mausoleum

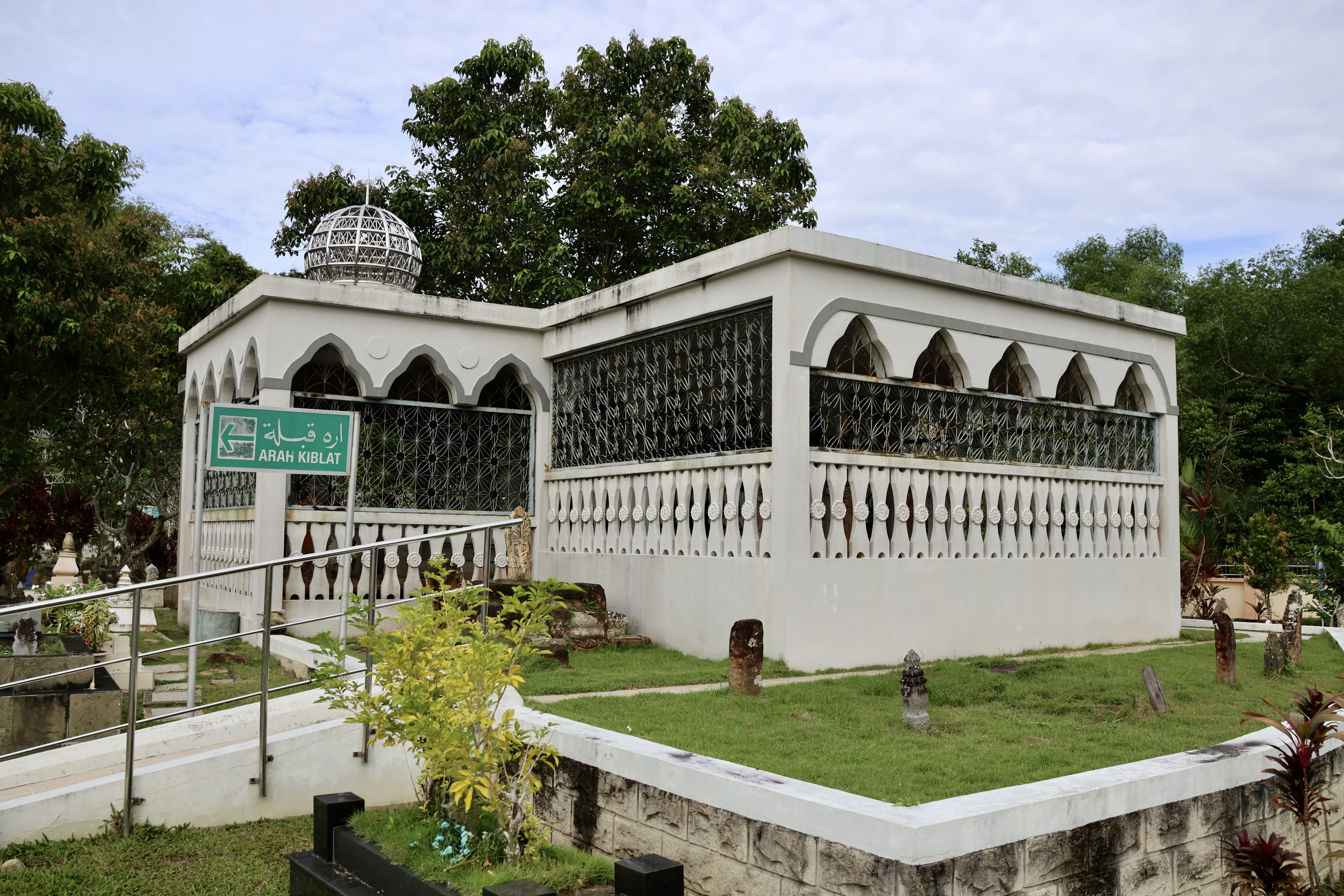
Exterior of block 3

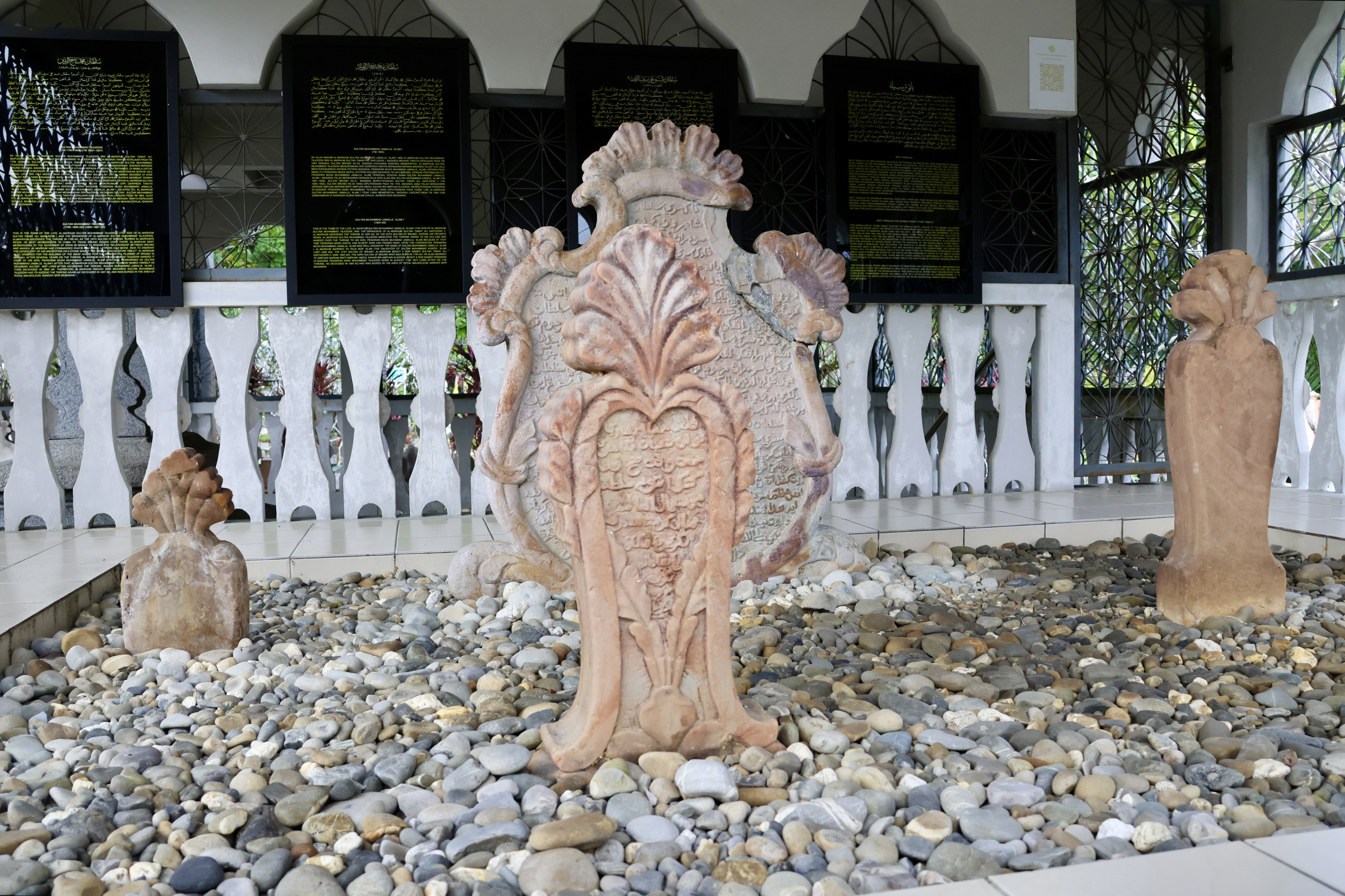
Interior of block 3

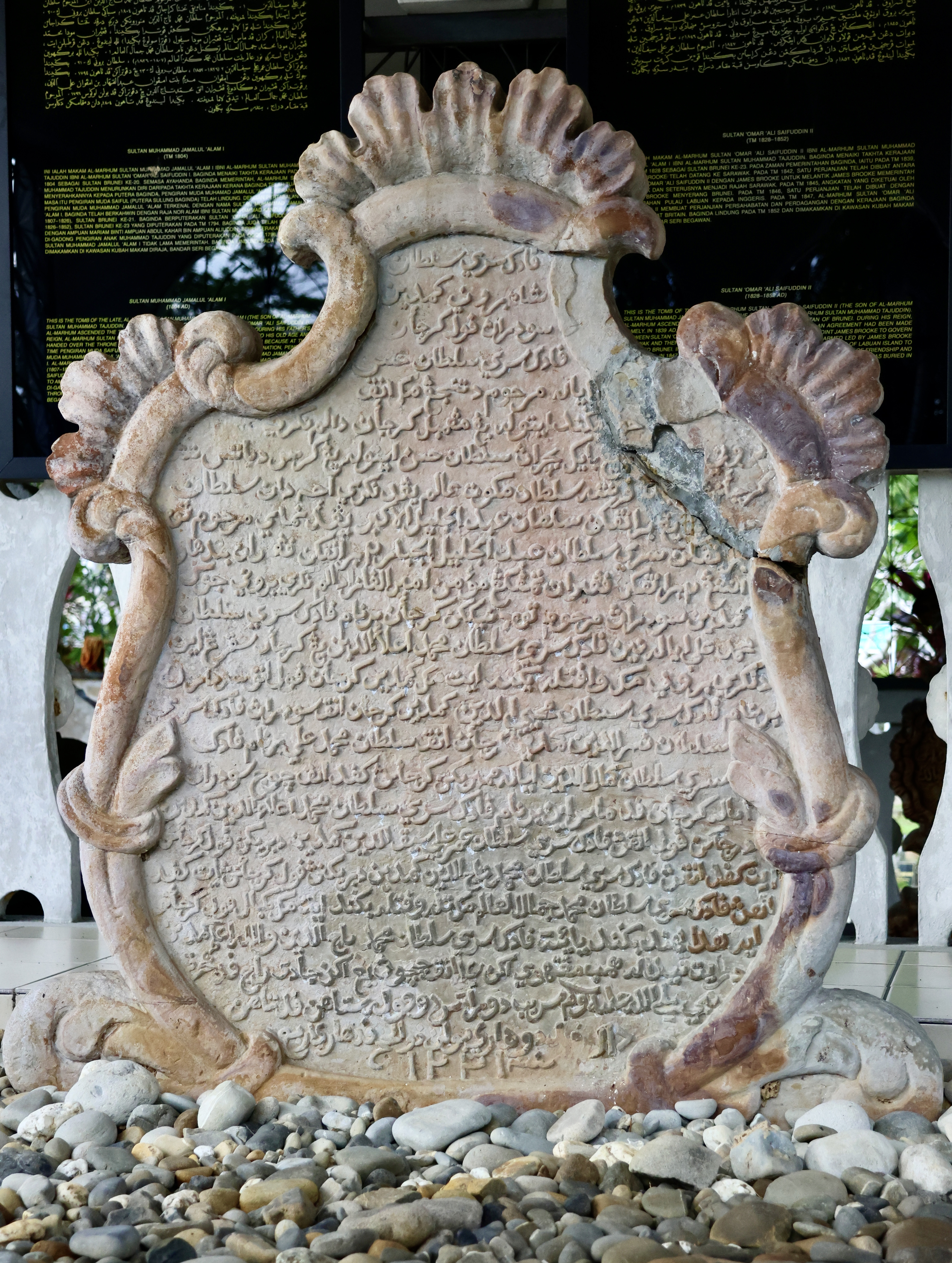
Batu Tarsilah inside Block 3

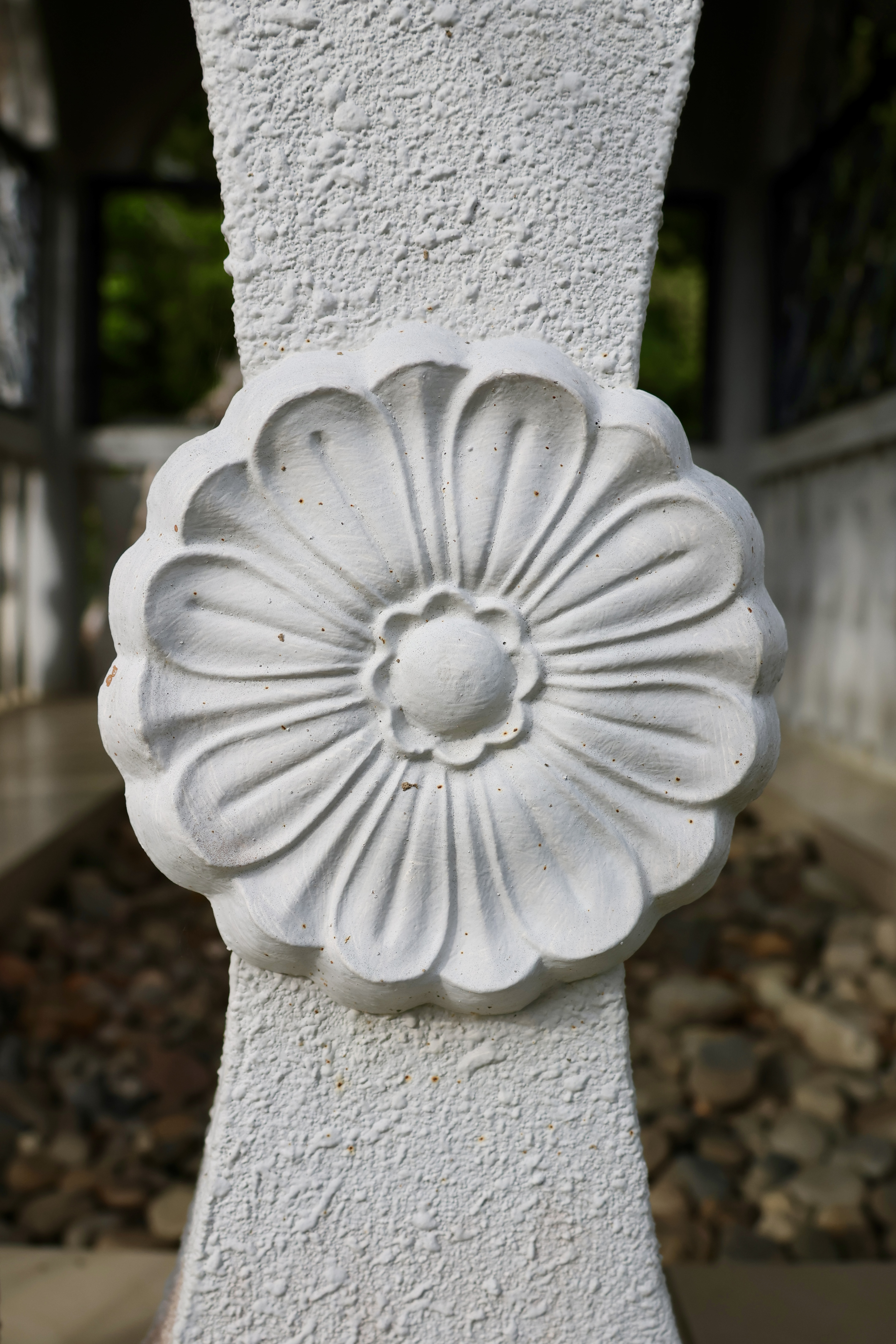
Motifs on block 2
