= Kampong Sumbiling Lama =

Village in Bandar Seri Begawan, Brunei

Kampong Sumbiling Lama Kampung Sumbiling Lama
- Village
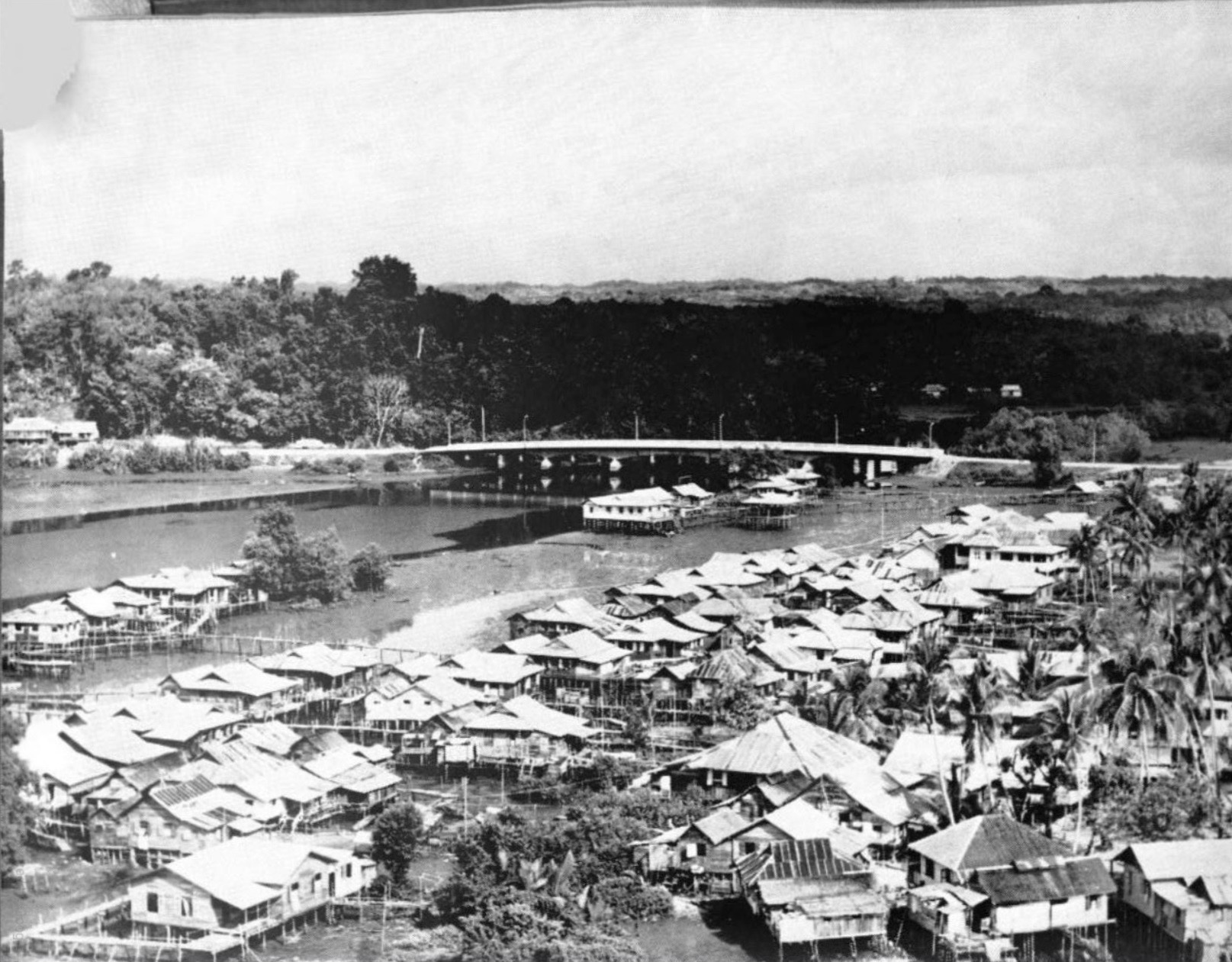
- View of the stilt houses of Kampong Sumbiling Lama and the Edinburgh Bridge in 1964

- Location in Brunei
- Coordinates: 4°53′32″N 114°56′16″E
- Country: Brunei
- District: Brunei–Muara
- Mukim: Sungai Kedayan
- Planned: 1909
- First settled: 1910

Government
  - Village head: Mayalin Saat

Population (2021)
  - Total: 241
- Time zone: UTC+8 (BNT)
- Postal code: BN1111

Kampong Sumbiling Lama (Note: Not to be confused with Kampong Sumbiling of Mukim Amo in Temburong District.) (Malay: Kampung Sumbiling Lama) is a neighbourhood in Kampong Ayer, the riverine stilt settlement in Bandar Seri Begawan, the capital of Brunei. It was officially a village subdivision under Sungai Kedayan, a mukim (subdistrict) of Brunei–Muara District. The village's name originated from the division of Kampong Sumbiling into two sections, one of which became Kampong Sumbiling Baru.

== Geography ==
Kampong Sumbiling Lama is geographically located on the banks of the Kedayan River, with its boundaries extending to the Gadong River and neighbouring villages such as Kampong Ujong Bukit, Kampong Limbongan, and Kampong Sumbiling Baru. The area historically faced Kampong Bukit Salat across the river. However, the neighbouring villages no longer exists due to its inclusion in the Bandar Seri Begawan reclamation project. As part of this development, all residents were relocated to government housing plans beginning in July 2017.

== History ==
The transition from Kampong Ayer to the mainland commenced with the Bruneian royal family, who recognised the potential of British Resident McArthur's vision for establishing an administrative capital on land. In 1909, the royal family took advantage of McArthur's residential development along Kampong Sungai Tekuyung, Kampong Sumbiling, and Kampong Sultan Lama, acquiring land with permanent title rights. This strategic decision allowed them to secure prime locations while opening additional lands for cultivation and habitation. By 1910, McArthur officially proposed relocating Kampong Ayer residents to the mainland, beginning with areas along the Brunei River and later extending to the outskirts for agricultural development. The Wazirs, including the families of Pengiran Bendahara and Pengiran Di-Gadong, were among the first to settle, choosing the banks of the Kedayan River and Kampong Sumbiling.

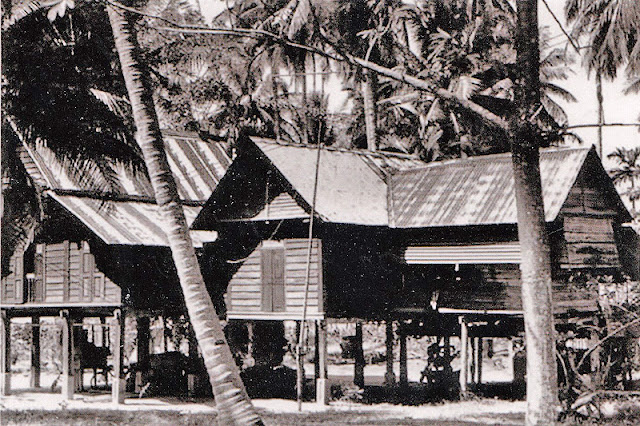
A traditional Malay house in Kampong Sumbiling Lama, c. 1958

During the 1950s, Kampung Sumbiling Lama played a crucial role in Brunei's development, particularly in facilitating the construction of the Omar Ali Saifuddien Mosque. Parts of Kampung Sumbiling Lama and Kampung Bukit Salat were relocated to areas near the Rangas Bridge (Note: Known by another name, the Clifford Bridge, it is among Brunei's oldest bridges.) along the Kedayan River to make way for the mosque, resulting in the creation of Kampong Sumbiling Baru in areas such as Jalan Tutong. The newer Edinburgh Bridge, one of the earliest bridges, connected these relocated settlements with Kampong Pusar Ulak, improving accessibility. In 1958, many residents of Kampong Sumbiling Lama, predominantly Bruneian Malays, moved from Kampong Ayer to land-based communities such as Kampong Pancha Delima, marking another significant phase of relocation.

In 1970, the residents of Kampong Sumbiling Baru were moved inland to Kampong Perpindahan Mata-Mata as part of a government resettlement programme. This relocation coincided with the redevelopment of the Kampong Sumbiling Baru site and road expansion projects along Jalan Tutong. The area underwent significant changes, including road widening and the construction of the Supreme Court building near the riverbanks, replacing the original Kampong Parit.

By 1983, as part of the government's broader relocation initiative, Kampong Sumbiling Lama became one of the first communities to move to Kampong Perpindahan Mata-Mata. This programme also aimed to house those displaced by major fires. Residents of Kampong Sumbiling Lama were the first to relocate, followed by those from Kampong Sumbiling Baru and other affected villages, including Kampong Sungai Kedayan, Kampong Sultan Lama, Kampong Pulau Baru-Baru, Kampong Pulau Berbunut, and Kampong Bunut. Heads of households were granted freehold land titles, while their descendants paid monthly instalments, completing a significant phase in Brunei’s transition from water-based to land-based living.

== Places of interest ==
Istana Darussalam, located on Jalan Darussalam, is the former residence of Omar Ali Saifuddien III and the birthplace of the current sultan of Brunei, Hassanal Bolkiah. Now a tourist attraction, the palace is protected under the Antiquities and Treasure Trove Act by the Museums Department.

== Notable people ==
- Hasbollah Daud (born 1902), businessman and politician
- Pengiran Muda Hashim (1907–1998), nobleman and politician
- Pengiran Muda Abdul Kahar (1922–1957), nobleman and civil servant
- Pengiran Anak Kemaluddin (1929–2012), nobleman and legislative speaker
- Zaini Ahmad (born 1935), politician and writer
- Hassanal Bolkiah (born 1946), sultan of Brunei
- Pengiran Anak Saleha (born 1946), queen consort of Brunei
- Prince Mohamed Bolkiah (born 1947), politician and diplomat
- Matussin Omar (born 1948), historian and writer
- Pengiran Anak Mohammad Yusof (1948–2004), nobleman and civil servant
- Yusoff Ismail (born 1952), politician and diplomat
- Pengiran Anak Muhammad Bey Muntassir (1956–2009), nobleman

== Gallery ==
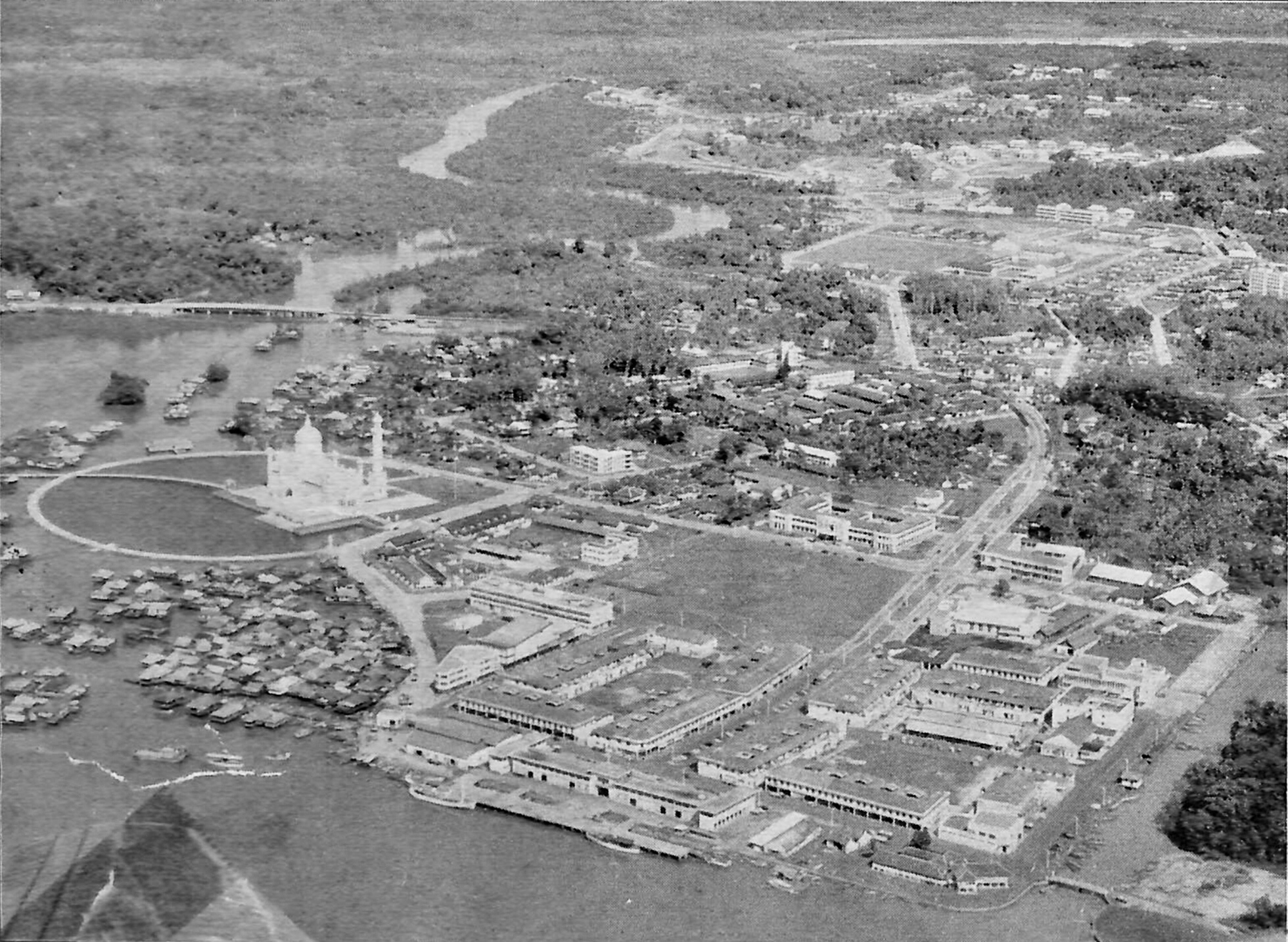
Kampong Sumbiling Lama (centre, left) and the city centre in c. 1960

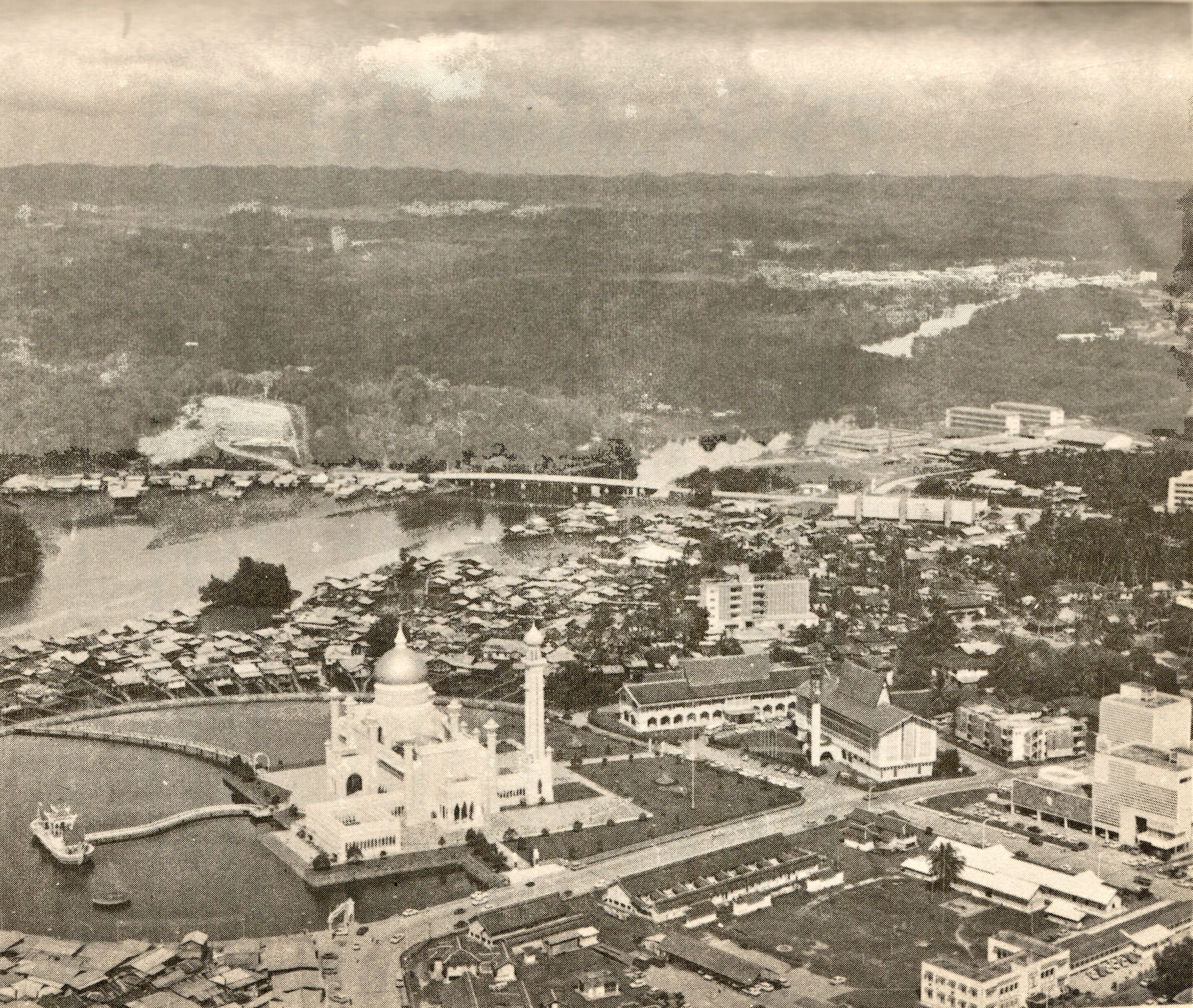
Kampong Bukit Salat and Sumbiling Lama (left) on the Kedayan River in 1964

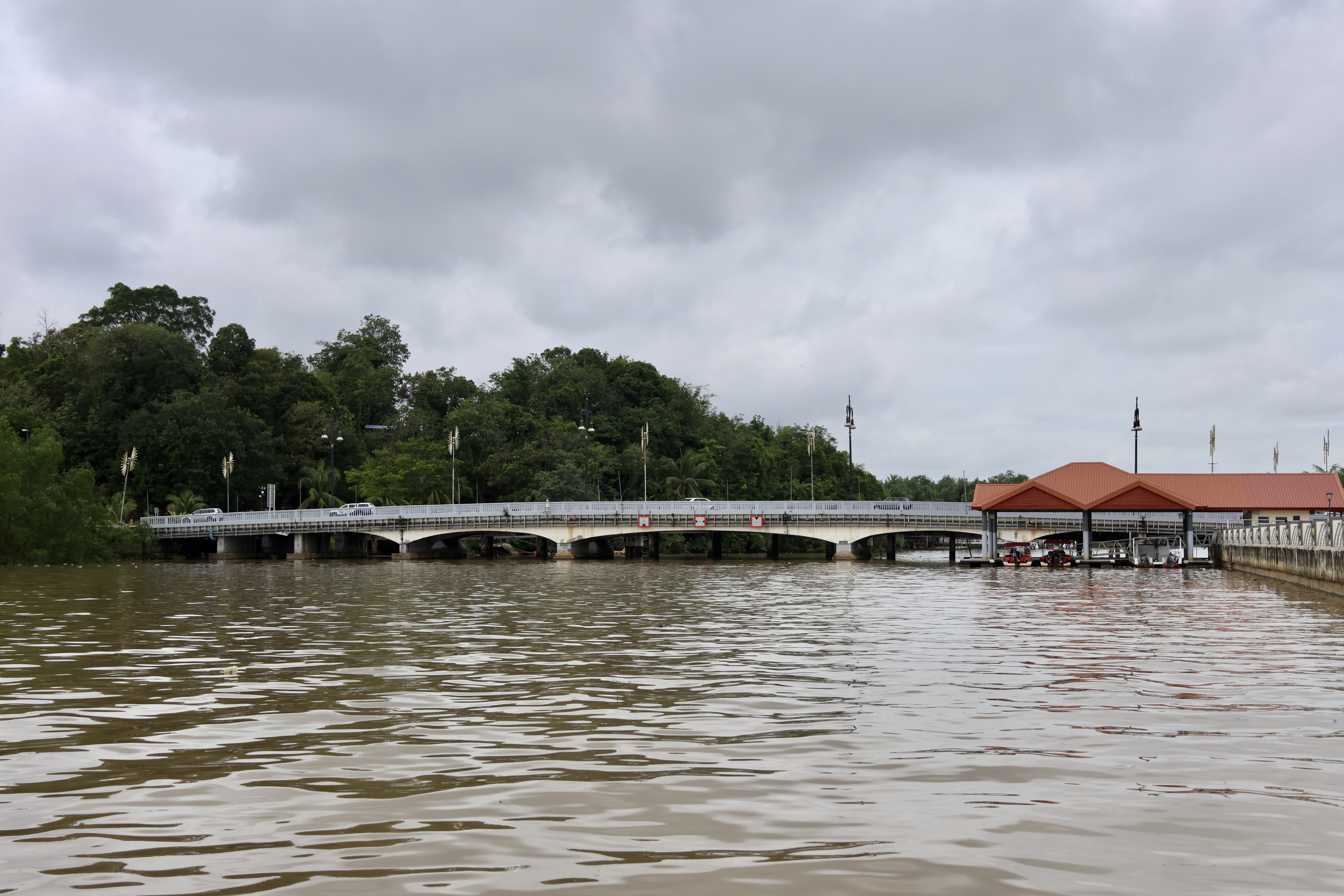
Kampong Sumbiling Lama (right) and the Edinburgh Bridge (centre) in 2022

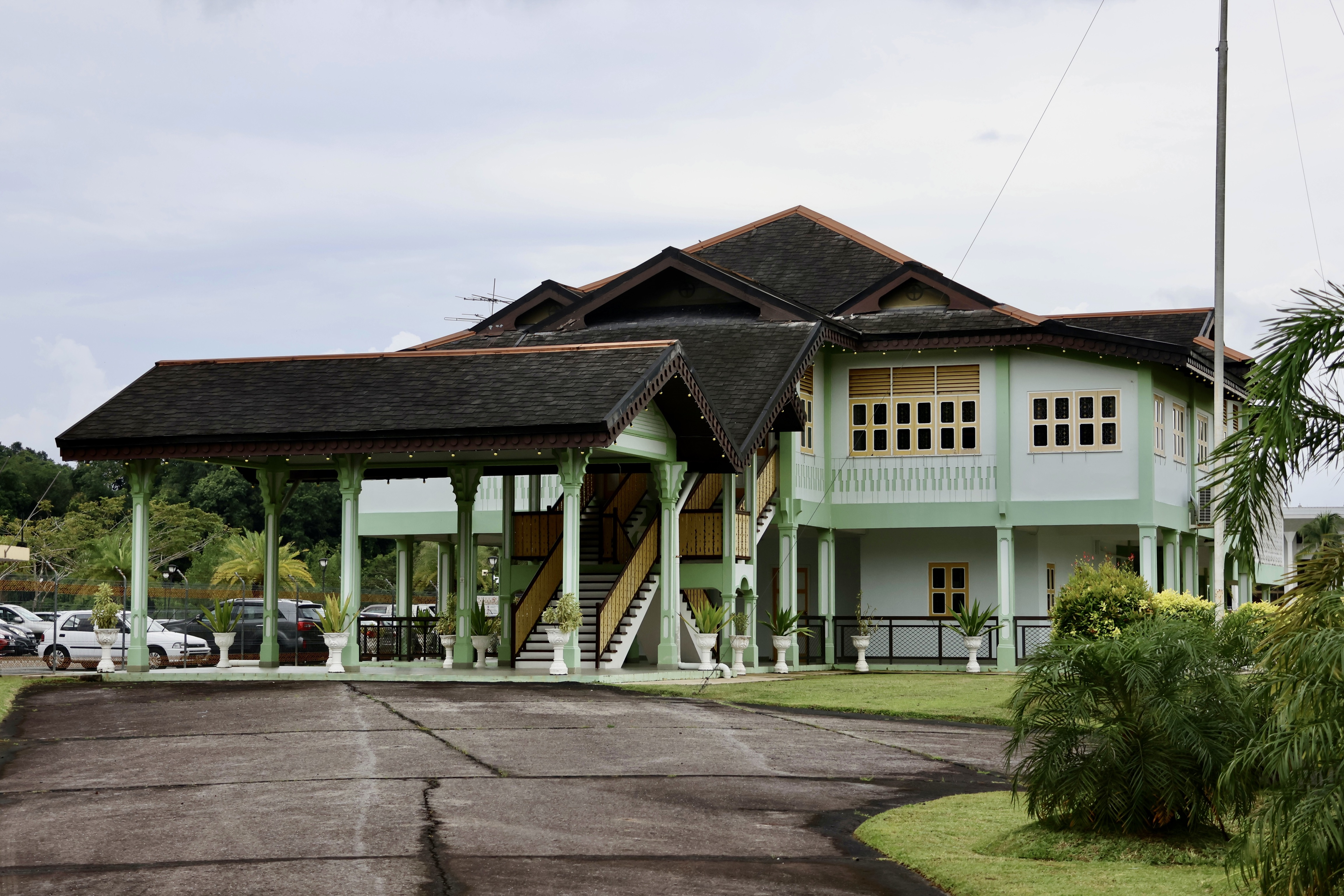
Istana Darussalam in Kampong Sumbiling Lama in 2022

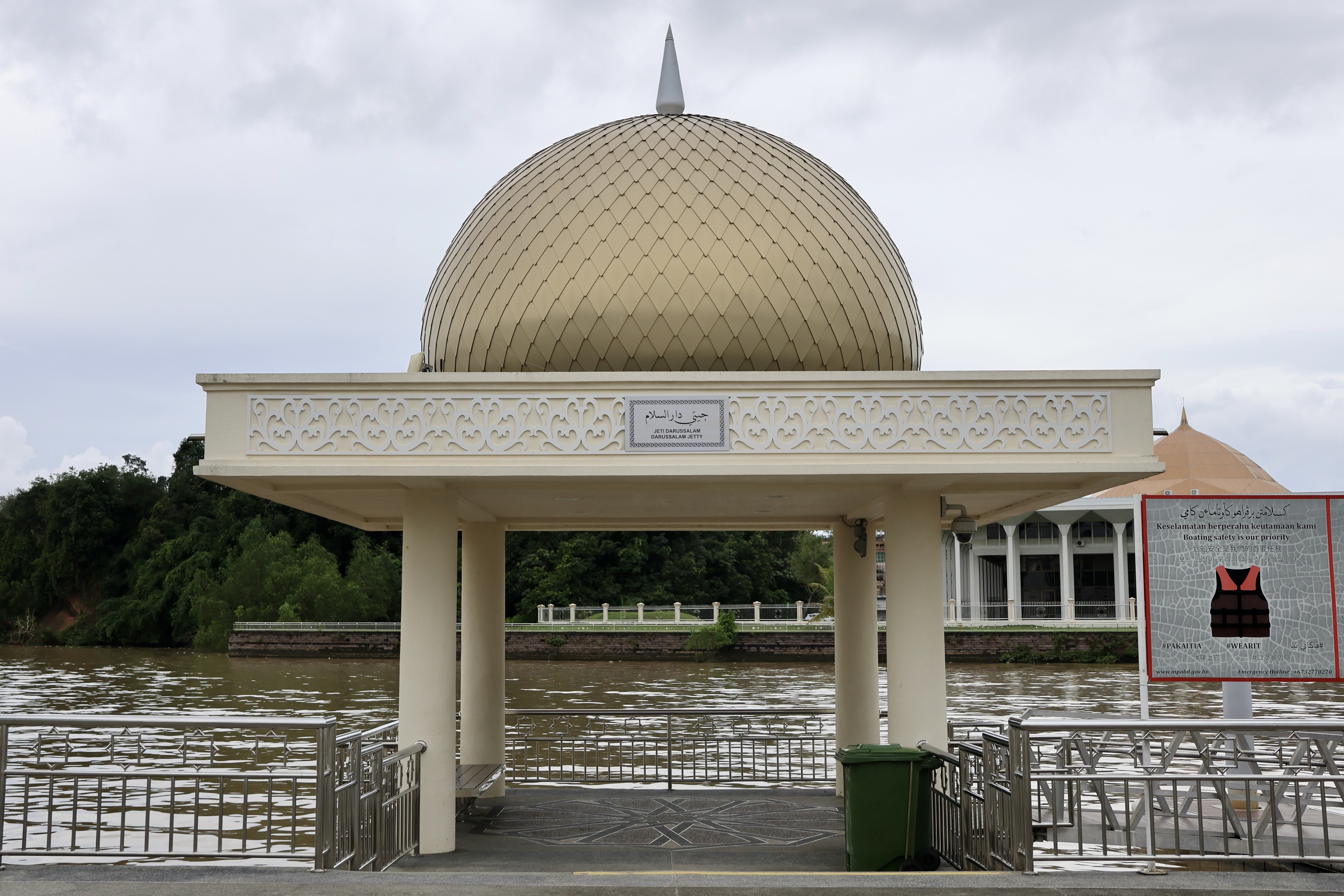
Darussalam Jetty in Kampong Sumbiling Lama in 2022

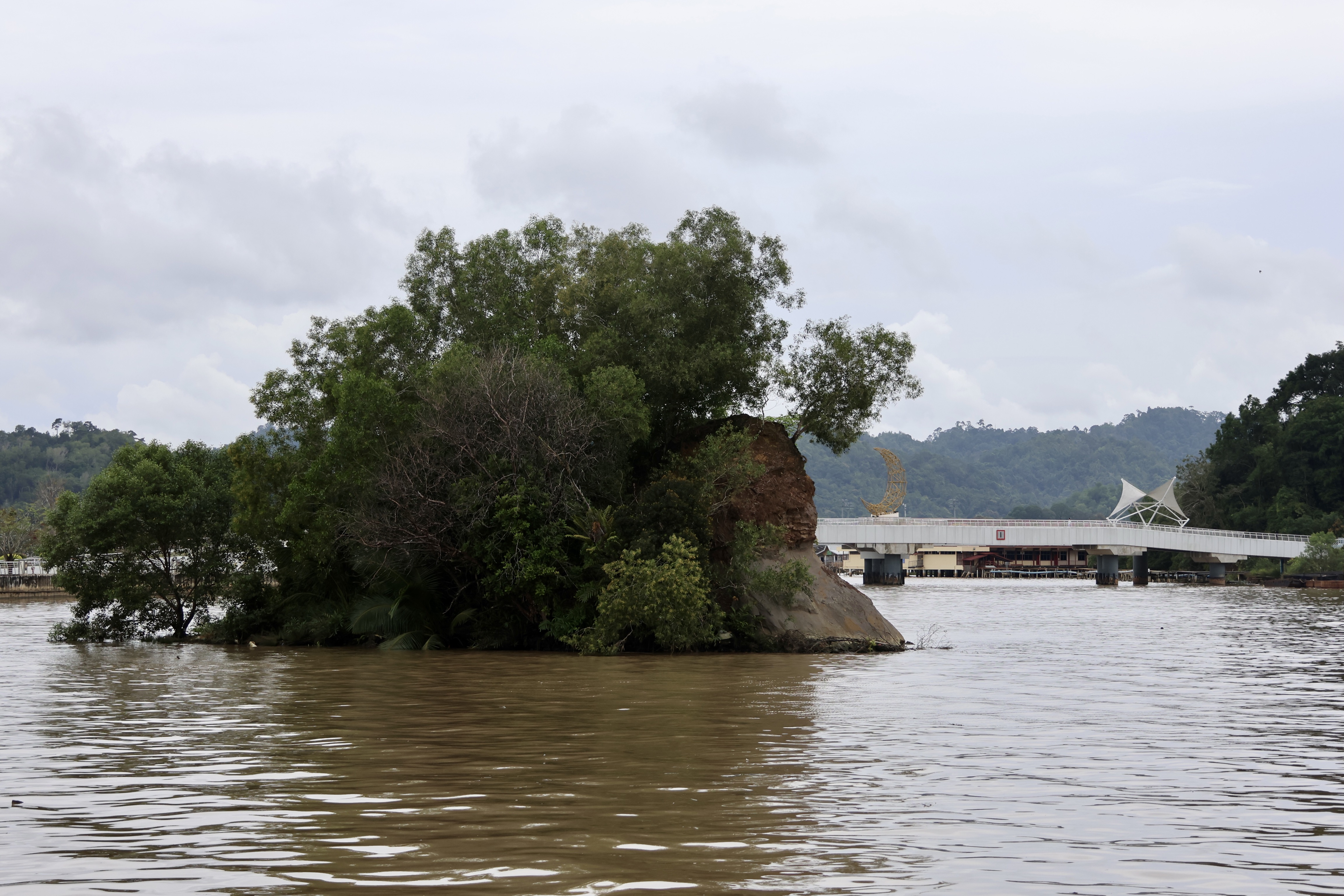
Bukit Salat seen from Kampong Sumbiling Lama in 2022
