= Kemuda Institute =

Brunei private college

- Institut Kemuda
- Motto: Empowering Your World of Learning
- Type: vocational college
- Established: 2004
- Affiliations: Pearson BTEC, NCC Education
- Chairman: Dato Paduka Haji Abdul Razak bin Muhammad
- Principal: Mohammed Khairy Yusrin
- Location: Bandar Seri Begawan, Brunei; 4°52′43″N 114°53′18″E
- Website: kemudainstitute.com

Kemuda Institute (KI) is a private college in Brunei. It was established in 2004 and has campuses in Beribi in Bandar Seri Begawan. Kemuda Institute mainly provides vocational courses in computing and information technology, leading up to BTEC qualification by Pearson as well as diplomas by NCC Education, two UK-based vocational qualifications providers. The current Chairman of Kemuda Institute is Dato Paduka Haji Abdul Razak bin Muhammad, who is also the founder of the college.
