= Pengiran Anak Kemaluddin =

Bruneian legislative speaker (1929–2012)

Yang Amat Mulia Pengiran Indera Mahkota Pengiran Anak Kemaluddin PSLJ SPMB POAS PHBS PBLI PJK PKL
- كمال الدين
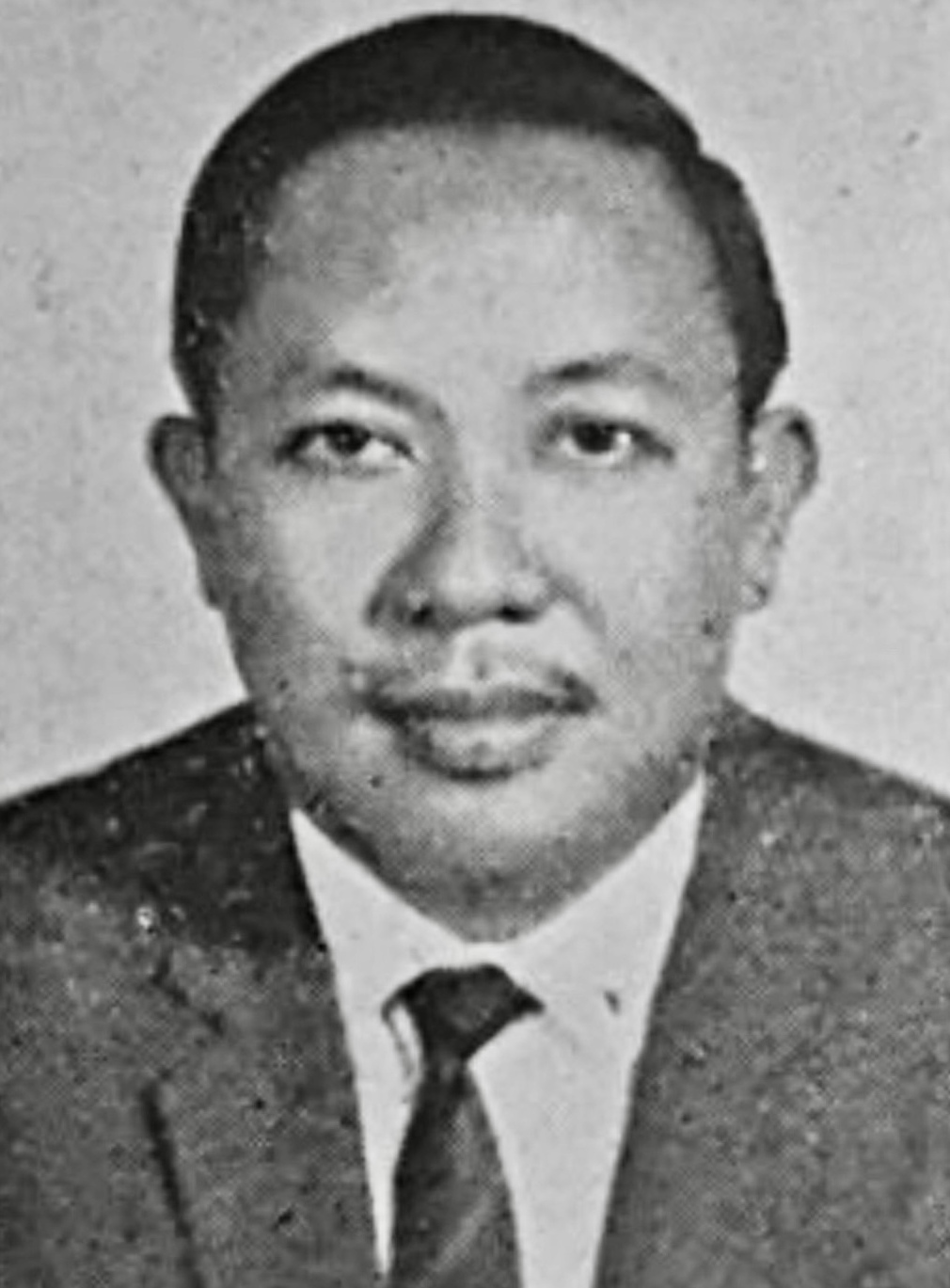
- Pengiran Anak Kemaluddin, c. 1967

6th Speaker of the Legislative Council of Brunei
- In office 25 September 2004 – 9 February 2011
- Prime Minister: Hassanal Bolkiah
- Succeeded by: Isa Ibrahim
- In office 15 December 1981 – 14 February 1984
- Menteri Besar: Abdul Aziz Umar (acting)
- Preceded by: Pengiran Abu Bakar

2nd State Religious Affairs Officer
- In office 1 September 1962 – 1970
- Preceded by: Pengiran Muhammad Ali
- Succeeded by: Zain Serudin

Personal details
- Born: 8 March 1929 Kampong Sumbiling Lama, Brunei Town, Brunei
- Died: 9 January 2012 (aged 82) Kampong Beribi, Bandar Seri Begawan, Brunei
- Resting place: Royal Mausoleum, Bandar Seri Begawan, Brunei
- Spouse: Pengiran Anak Siti Rafiah
- Relations: Pengiran Muda Abdul Kahar (brother); Pengiran Anak Idris (nephew); Pengiran Muda Hashim (father-in-law)
- Children: 6, including Pengiran Anak Abdul Rahim and Pengiran Anak Muhammad Bey Muntassir
- Parents: Pengiran Anak Muhammad Yasin (father); Pengiran Nor Alam (mother)
- Occupation: Civil servant

Pengiran Anak Kemaluddin (Note: The alternate spelling of his given name is "Pengiran Anak Kemaludin Al-Haj" or "Pengiran Muda Kemaluddin" rather than "Pengiran Anak Kemaluddin.") (8 March 1929 – 9 January 2012) was a Bruneian noble civil servant. He served as Brunei's state religious affairs officer from 1962 to 1970 before becoming the speaker of the Legislative Council of Brunei (LegCo) from 1981 to 1984 and 2004 to 2011. Additionally, he has served as a member of the Privy Council. Additionally, he was the father-in-law of Princess Rashidah, daughter of Sultan Hassanal Bolkiah.

Under the reign of Sultan Omar Ali Saifuddien III, Pengiran Anak Kemaluddin was instrumental in bolstering Brunei's Islamic government. He led the creation of the Department of Religious Affairs as a distinct organisation on 1 July 1954, with the goal of enhancing religious administration, which had hitherto been restricted to issues like marriage and divorce. He was the founder of several Arabic schools. The institutions included the Seri Begawan Religious Teachers College (MPUSB), the Raja Isteri Pengiran Anak Damit Girls' Arabic Religious Secondary School, and the Hassanal Bolkiah Boys' Arabic Secondary School.

== Early life and education ==
Pengiran Anak Kemaluddin was born on 8 March 1929 in Kampong Sumbiling Lama, Jalan Stoney, Brunei Town (now Bandar Seri Begawan). He was the son of Pengiran Bendahara Pengiran Anak Haji Muhammad Yasin bin Pengiran Tua Omar Ali, a nobleman. He has an older brother Pengiran Muda Abdul Kahar. He received his early education at a private Arabic school and Brunei Town Malay School before furthering his studies at Stamford School in Penang and St. Joseph's School in Kuching, Sarawak.

== Career ==
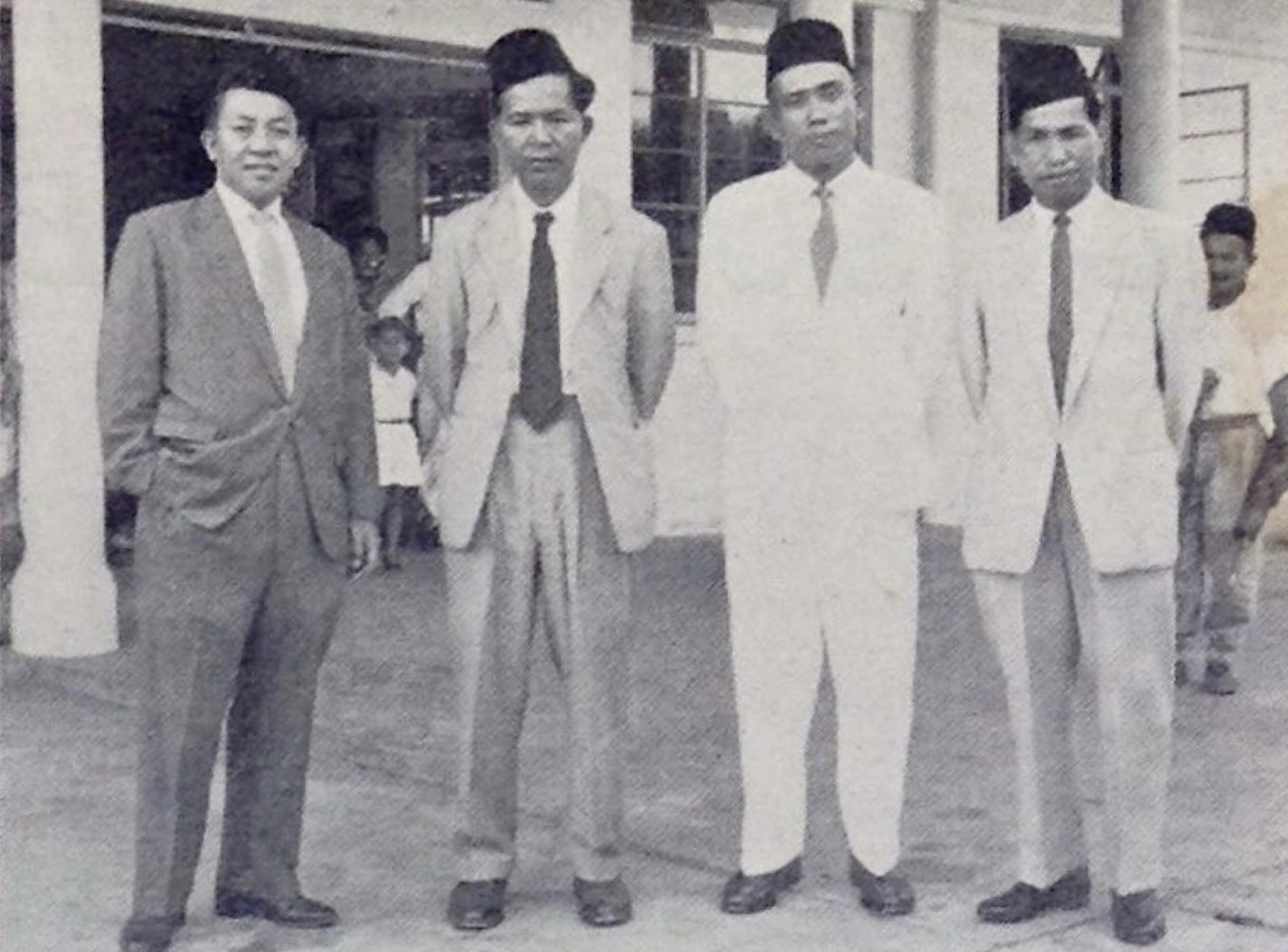
Pengiran Anak Kemaluddin (first from the left) and Pengiran Abdul Momin (first from the right) at the Brunei Airport in 1961

Pengiran Anak Kemaluddin began his career as a demarcator, draughtsman, and Malay and English clerk before advancing to the role of secretary of the Department of Customs, Religious and Social Welfare upon its formation on 1 July 1954. He later served as the secretary to the Brunei Islamic Religious Council (MUIB) from 1 July 1959 to 1962 and as the state religious affairs officer from 1 September 1962 to 1970. Around the same time, he also held the position of head of the MUIB from 1 June 1963 to 31 May 1971.

During this period, Pengiran Anak Kemaluddin officiated the opening of the Kampong Bakian Religious School in Lamunin, Tutong District, on 15 April 1966. Later that year, on 1 September, during the official opening of the Department of Religious Affairs' new building, he expressed disappointment over the limited scope of Islamic administration, which was mainly confined to marriage, divorce, reconciliation, alimony, and minor aspects of unlawful intercourse. He highlighted the need for a more comprehensive and structured approach to religious governance to better serve the country's Muslim population. Sultan Omar Ali Saifuddien III appointed him as a member of the LegCo, and he was officially sworn in on 22 December before Speaker Ibrahim Mohammad Jahfar.

In March 1967, he spoke about the significance of the newly built madrasah building and other religious development projects, highlighting the madrasah's crucial role in advancing Islamic education and noting that its construction cost nearly B$900,000. His address reflected the government's commitment to national development through improved religious governance and education. Additionally, he played a key role in realising the decree of the sultan in 1964 to establish the MPSUB, which was officially initiated with the laying of its foundation stone by Sultan Hassanal Bolkiah on 8 July 1968.

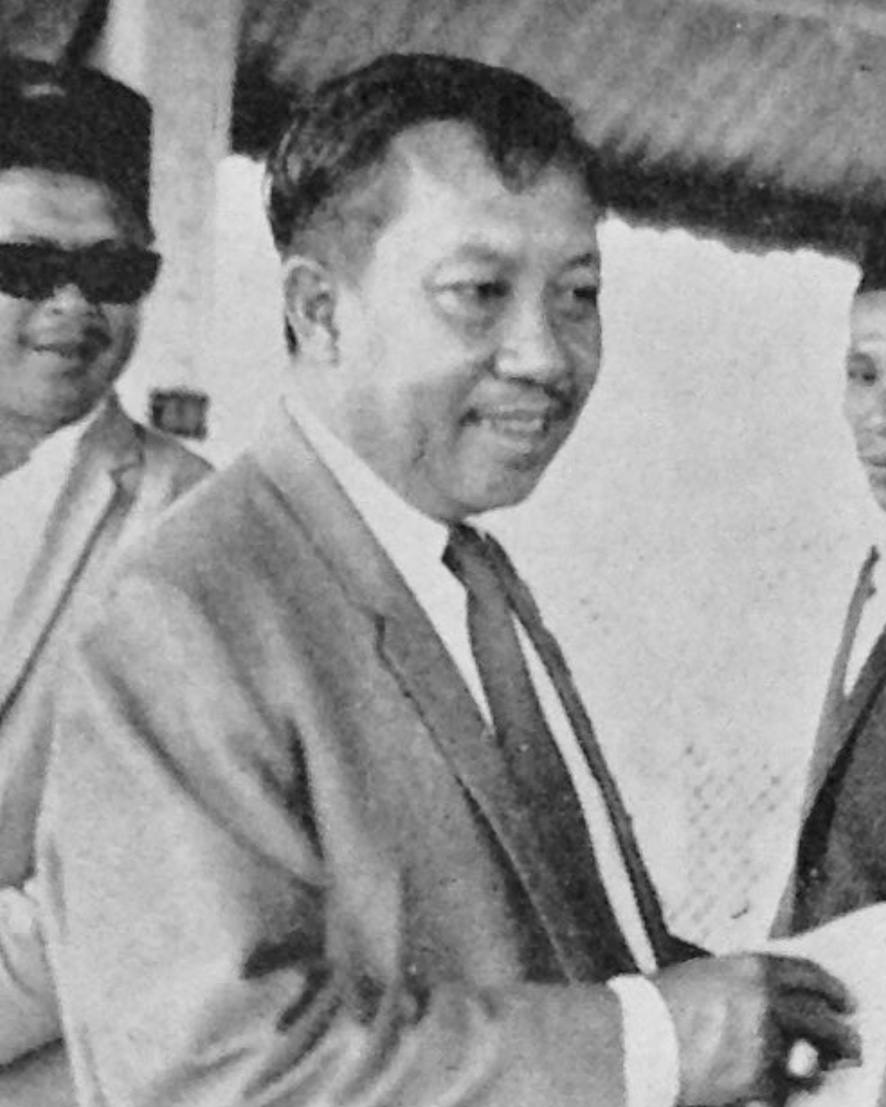
Pengiran Anak Kemaluddin in 1970

Pengiran Anak Kemaluddin was appointed director of resettlement in November 1970. He continued to play an active role in national development, emphasising the importance of unity in addressing threats and supporting government initiatives to improve living standards, particularly through the five-year National Development Plan, during the inauguration of the civic course for religious school headmasters in June 1977. His contributions to religious and community development were further demonstrated in December 1979 when he officiated the opening of the Kampong Tanah Jambu Mosque, which was constructed at a cost of $130,000 and could accommodate around 200 people as part of the 1400 Hijrah Muslim New Year celebrations.

On 15 December 1981, the sultan appointed Pengiran Anak Kemaluddin as the Speaker of the LegCo. Pengiran Anak Kemaluddin visited Singapore from 12 to 21 March 1982, during which he called on President Devan Nair and First Lady Avadai Dhanam Lakshimi, met with Singaporean ministers, and toured various government departments. The inaugural meeting of the council was held on 27 December 1983, and he served in this role until the council's dissolution on 13 February 1984. He officially left office the following day.

The LegCo was re-opened on 25 September 2004, after a 21-year hiatus, with its first agenda being the proposed amendment of the 1959 constitution. However, the council was dissolved again on 2 September 2005, and Pengiran Anak Kemaluddin was reappointed as speaker. He continued in this role until he left office on 9 February 2011, being replaced by Isa Ibrahim.

== Death and funeral ==
Pengiran Anak Kemaluddin died on 9 January 2012 at the age of 82. His funeral was attended by Sultan Hassanal Bolkiah, Queen Saleha, Prince Mohamed Bolkiah, and Prince Sufri Bolkiah, among other dignitaries. The funeral prayer was led by the State Mufti Abdul Aziz Juned, and his remains were laid to rest at the Royal Mausoleum, Bandar Seri Begawan.

On 19 January 2012, a ceremony to recite surah yasin, tahlil, and prayers for Pengiran Anak Kemaludin was held at the Dewan Bankuet in Bandar Seri Begawan. Attendees included Speaker Isa, Judin Asar, Goh King Chin, and other senior members of the LegCo and officials.

== Personal life ==
Pengiran Anak Kemaluddin is married to Pengiran Anak Siti Rafiah, daughter of Pengiran Muda Hashim. Together they have six children, a daughter died in 2000. Meanwhile his sons, Pengiran Anak Abdul Rahim, married Princess Rashidah in 1996, and Pengiran Anak Muhammad Bey Muntassir, married Princess Amal Jefriah in 1980. His family resides along Jalan Gadong in Kampong Beribi.

== Titles, styles and honours ==
=== Titles and styles ===
Personal standard of Pengiran Indera Mahkota

On 29 February 1968, Pengiran Anak Kemaluddin was honoured by Sultan Hassanal Bolkiah with the cheteria title of Pengiran Maharaja Anaknda. He was later elevated to the title of Pengiran Indera Mahkota on 16 May 1968. Each of these titles carries the style Yang Amat Mulia.

=== Awards ===
He has been given the following awards:

- Anugerah Jasawan Ugama (8 May 1997)
- Anugerah Pendidikan Sultan Haji Omar 'Ali Saifuddien (24 September 2011)

=== Honours ===
Pengiran Anak Kemaluddin has been bestowed the following honours:

- Order of Paduka Seri Laila Jasa First Class (PSLJ; 10 February 1976) – Dato Paduka Seri Laila Jasa
- Order of Paduka Seri Laila Jasa Second Class (DSLJ; 23 September 1967) – Dato Seri Laila Jasa
- Order of Seri Paduka Mahkota Brunei First Class (SPMB) – Dato Seri Paduka (12 April 1969)
- Order of Seri Paduka Mahkota Brunei Second Class (DPMB) – Dato Paduka (1963)
- Omar Ali Saifuddin Medal (POAS; 1961)
- Sultan Hassanal Bolkiah Medal (PHBS; 12 April 1969)
- Pingat Bakti Laila Ikhlas (PBLI; 2008)
- Meritorious Service Medal (PJK; 1968)
- Long Service Medal (PKL; 1974)
- Proclamation of Independence Medal (10 March 1997)
- Coronation Medal (1969)
- Campaign Medal
- Honorary Doctorate from Universiti Brunei Darussalam (28 September 1996)

== Notes ==
Political offices
Preceded by Pengiran Abu Bakar	6th Speaker of the Legislative Council of Brunei; 25 September 2004 – 9 February 2011; 15 December 1981 – 14 February 1984	Succeeded by Isa Ibrahim
Preceded by Pengiran Muhammad Ali	2nd State Religious Affairs Officer; 1 September 1962 – 1970	Succeeded by Zain Serudin
