= Kampong Beribi =

Beribi
- Village
- Kampong Beribi
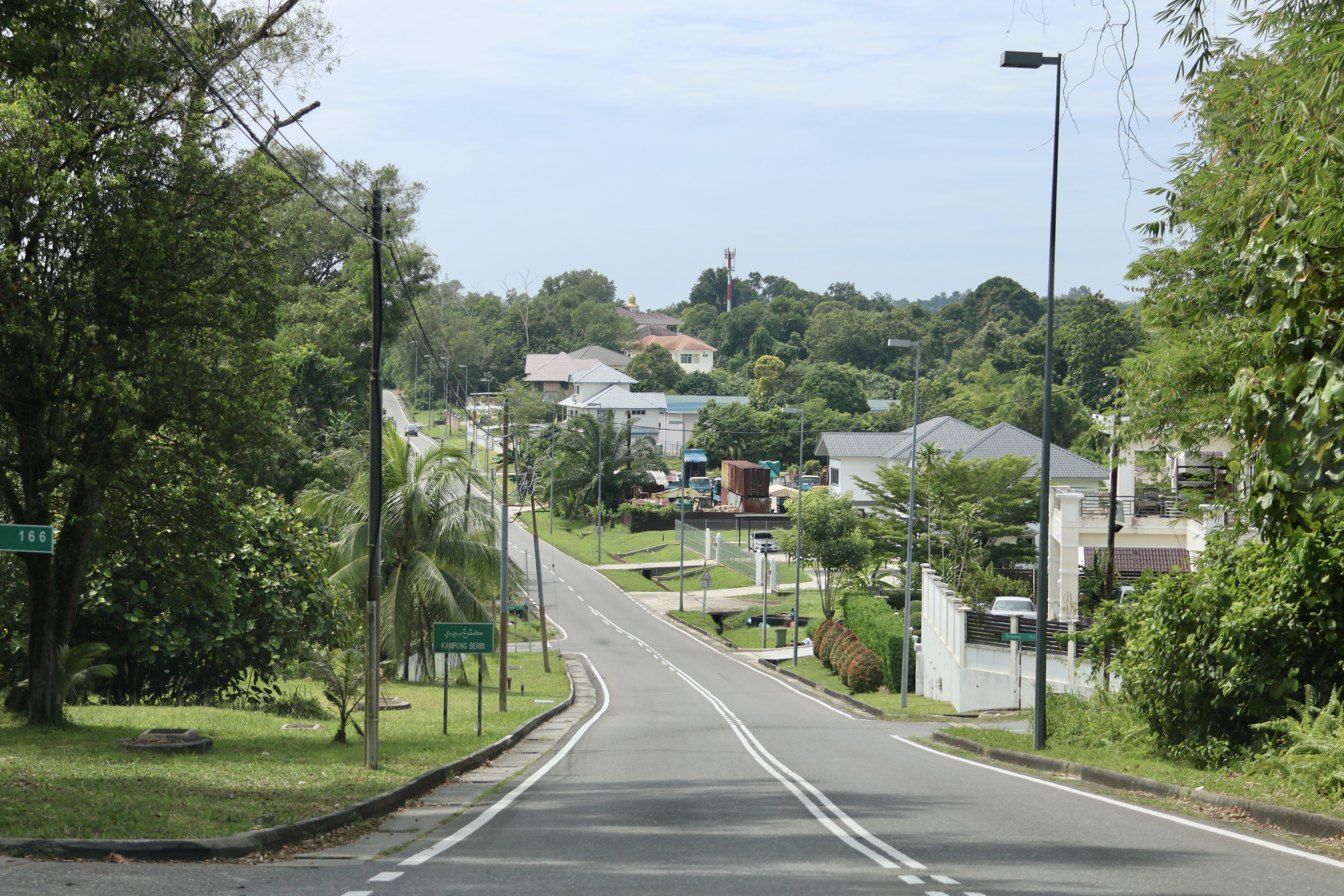

- Location in Brunei
- Coordinates: 4°53′03″N 114°53′46″E
- Country: Brunei
- District: Brunei-Muara
- Mukim: Gadong 'B'

Government
  - Village head: Ali Matassan (Area 1 & 3); Mohammad Faizal (Area 2)

Area
  - Total: 634.3316 ha (1,567.468 acres)

Population (2021)
  - Total: 6,490
  - Density: 1,020/km^{2} (2,650/sq mi)
- Time zone: UTC+8 (BNT)
- Postcode: BE1118

Kampong Beribi (Malay: Kampung Beribi) or commonly known as Beribi, is a village in Brunei-Muara District, Brunei, as well as a neighbourhood in the capital Bandar Seri Begawan. As of 2023, Beribi has a population of 6,490. It is one of the villages within Mukim Gadong 'B'. The postcode is BE1118.

== Etymology ==
The name of the village Beribi comes from the name of the plant 'beribi-beribi' which grows in abundance in the rivers in the village so that it can be used as a bridge. What is unique about the tree is that it only grows in Beribi River and Sunda River. The shape of the 'ribbed' plant is like a fragrant pandan leaf tree, thorny and has fruit with very hard roots. Due to growing too much, the 'beri-beribi' tree can be passed like a bridge when crossing a river. From the name of the tree, the name Kampong Beribi was derived.

== History ==
In the 1980s, residents cut 'huge' plants hired by a government agency due to there being too many 'beribi-beribi' plants filling the river, the work of weeding the river is done by paying wages for the work of cutting the plants. However, nowadays the plant no longer grows in any river in the village. One area in Kampung Beribi is the Jiam Beach Area which is believed to be a place gathering of refined people. The area once established a school called Jiam Beribi Beach School and was no longer used in 1985. What is interesting, the land has white beach sand, there are no trees and grass growing in the area. According to the old people who were knowledgeable, the area was a place where noble people lived with their families (villages) in the area. However, the area has already been built residential buildings.

Village meals were held in the 1930s after threshing rice. The residents usually bring their own food and then it is served together with the food brought by others. If it's a fasting month, the villagers will gather together to eat on every Friday night and eat porridge such as rice porridge, yam porridge or bean porridge. Goods are sold in Sungai Menglait, people of Beribi were involved in selling fruit, which was sold for one to two dollars in the early 1940s and 1950s. For those who are going to sell village produce, they will walk as early as 3.00 am to the place and usually they are already waited to buy and sell.

== Administration ==
Apart from being a village subdivision, the village has also been subsumed under the municipal area of the capital Bandar Seri Begawan.

== Infrastructure ==
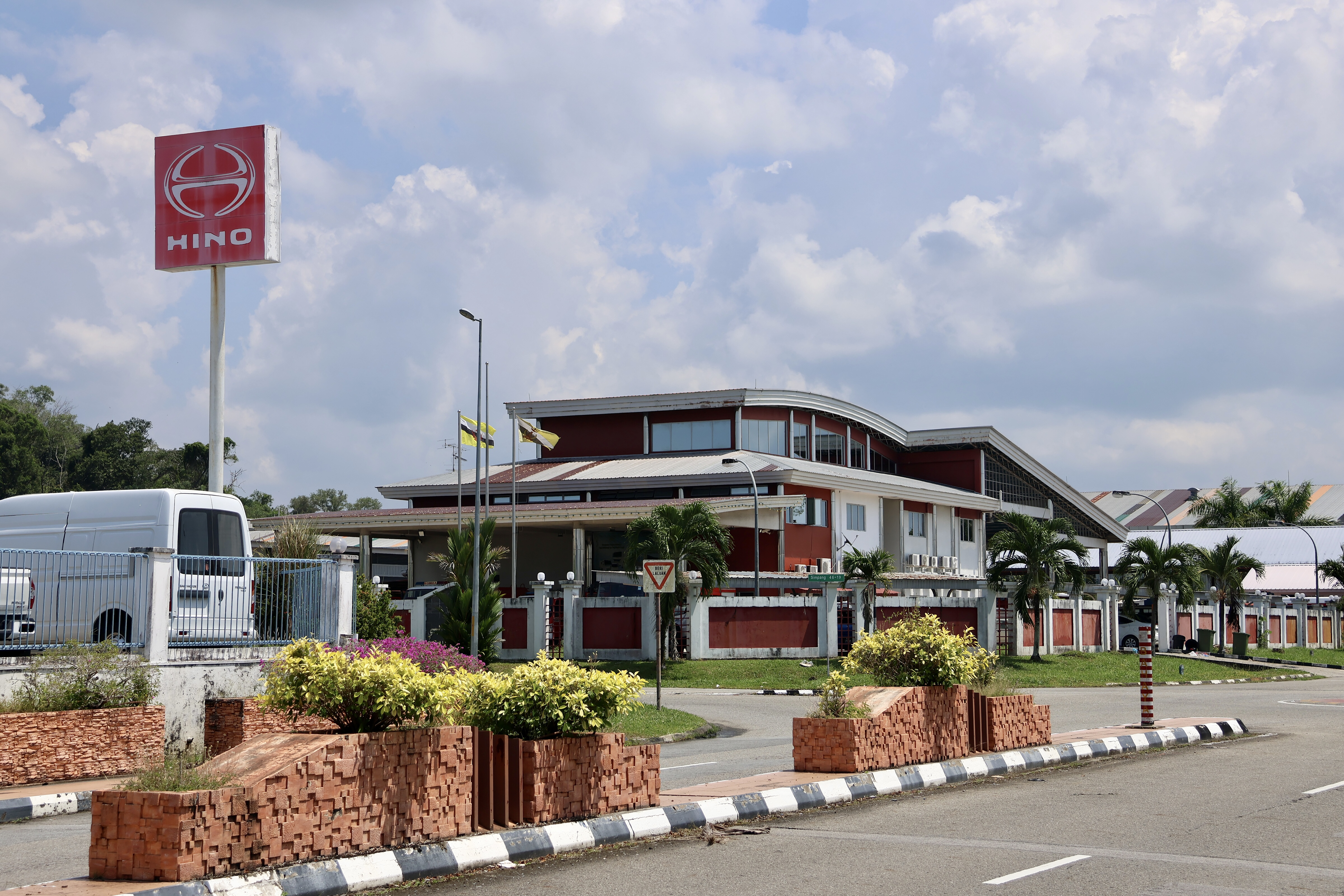
Beribi Fire Station

Like other villages, Kampong Beribi received facilities such as primary, secondary school buildings and also Higher Institutions. Telanai Primary School, Beribi Religious School, surau, mosque, Telanai flyover to the jungle, electricity, water, telephone, Beribi Mosque (can accommodate 500 pilgrims at a time), fire station, Youth Institute, Beribi Industrial Area, hotels and apartments are part of the development that has been implemented. The village is also home to the Consulate of Peru.

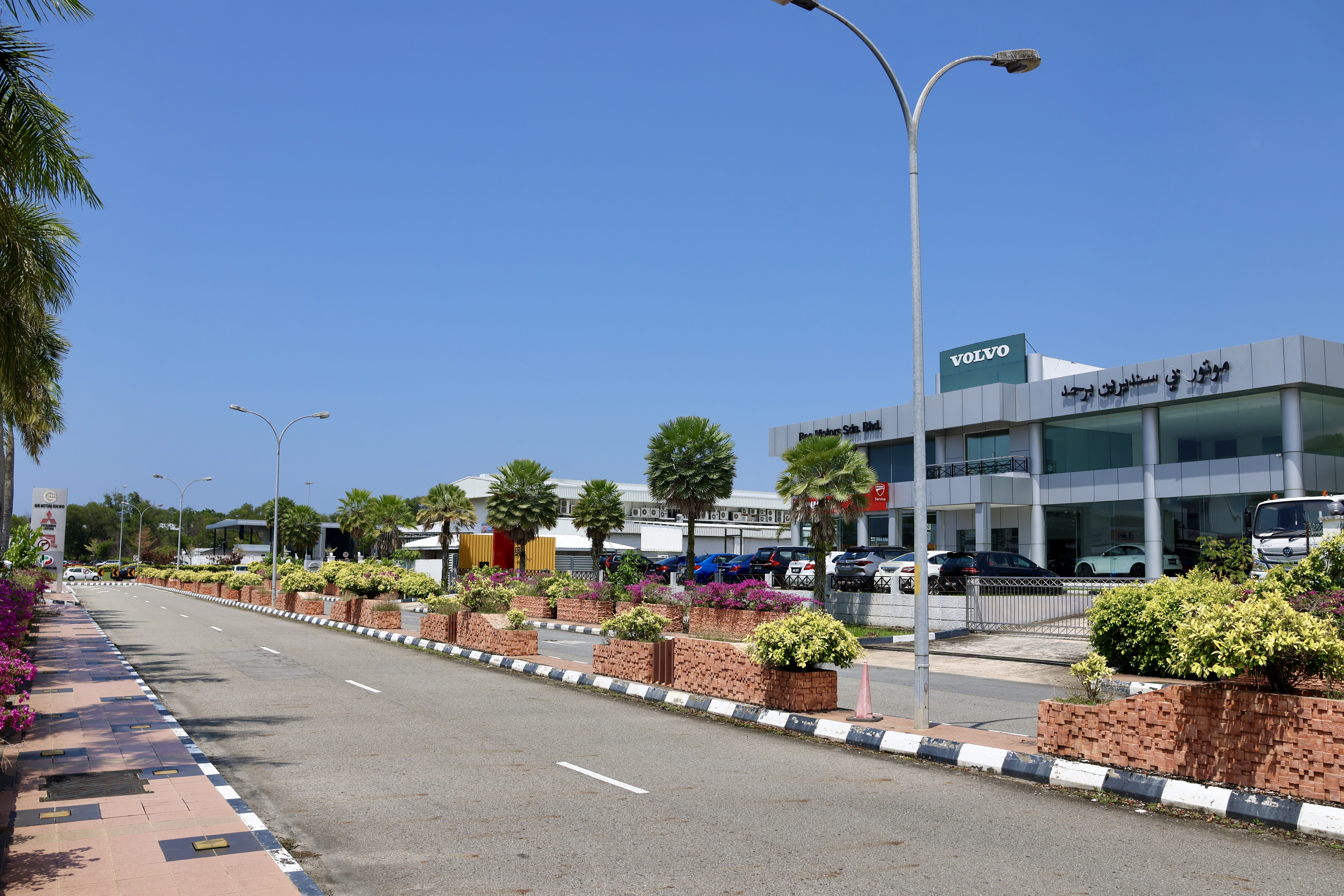
Beribi Industrial area

=== Commerce ===
The main commercial activity in Beribi is located at the Beribi Industrial area. The area is managed by the Darussalam Enterprise or DARe, a statutory body, which provides infrastructural facilities for light industry- and services-related businesses. The area comprises the Beribi Industrial Site and Complex, which provides land and building units respectively.

=== Education ===
The main campus of Kemuda Institute is located in Beribi; Kemuda Institute is one of the few private, post-secondary institutions providing vocational courses.

There is a government primary school in Beribi, namely Beribi Telanai Primary School, which provides general primary education to the resident pupils. The Ugama or the Islamic religious primary education, which is compulsory for the Muslim pupils in the country, is also provided in Beribi at Beribi Religious School.

=== Miscellaneous ===
Kampong Beribi Mosque is the primary mosque for the Muslim residents, mainly to fulfill the need for Jumu'ah or the congregational Friday prayers. The mosque has congregational capacity of 500 at one time.

On 3 July 2005, Sultan Hassanal Bolkiah attended the official opening of the PPNBD Headquarters and Scout Complex, which is situated in Beribi. There is the five-story, B$22 million PPNBD Administration Center.

== Notable people ==
- Pengiran Anak Kemaluddin (1929–2012)
- Princess Amal Rakiah Bolkiah (born 1956)
- Princess Amal Jefriah Bolkiah (born 1964)
- Pengiran Salleh Ab. Rahaman, father of Princess Sarah
