= Pengiran Anak Muhammad Bey Muntassir =

Bruneian nobility (1956–2009)

Pengiran Anak Muhammad Bey Muntassir ڤڠيران أنق محمد بي منتصر
- Pengiran Sura Negara
- Pengiran Anak Muhammad Bey Muntassir c. 1980
- Born: 1956; Kampong Sumbiling Lama, Kampong Ayer, Brunei
- Died: 25 November 2009 (aged 53); Jalan Beribi, Bandar Seri Begawan
- Burial: Royal Mausoleum, Bandar Seri Begawan, Brunei
- Spouse: Princess Amal Jefriah Bolkiah (m. 1980)
- Issue: List: Pengiran Anak Muhammad Abdul Haffiz; Pengiran Anak Muhammad Abdul Qayyum; Pengiran Anak Muhammad Abdul Razaaq; Pengiran Anak Nurul Amal Ni'matullah Athirah; Pengiran Anak Nurul Amal Munjiatul Athirah
Regnal name
- Pengiran Sura Negara Pengiran Anak Haji Muhammad Bey Muntassir bin Pengiran Indera Mahkota Pengiran Anak Kemaludin Al-Haj
- House: Bolkiah
- Father: Pengiran Anak Kemaluddin
- Mother: Pengiran Anak Datin Siti Hajah Rafiah
- Religion: Sunni Islam

Pengiran Anak Muhammad Bey Muntassir (1956 – 25 November 2009) was a member of the royal family of Brunei as the husband of Princess Amal Jefriah Bolkiah, the sixth daughter of Sultan Omar Ali Saifuddien III, and brother-in-law to Sultan Hassanal Bolkiah. Additionally, he was also a member of the Brunei Privy Council.

== Personal life ==
Born in 1956, in Kampong Sumbiling Lama's Jalan Stoney. Pengiran Anak Muhammad Bey Muntassir was the son of nobleman Pengiran Anak Kemaluddin and his wife, Pengiran Anak Datin Siti Rafiah. He is the grandson of Pengiran Muda Hashim. He attended Sultan Omar Ali Saifuddien College and Sultan Muhammad Jamalul Alam Malay School for education. His residence was located along Jalan Beribi in Bandar Seri Begawan. On 26 November 2009, Sultan Hassanal Bolkiah, Prince Jefri Bolkiah and other members of the royal family offered their last respects to him at Baitul Athirah, who had died that evening. Buried in the Royal Mausoleum.

== Marriage and children ==
Pengiran Anak Muhammad Bey Muntassir married Princess Amal Jefriah on 4 October 1980. Together they have 5 children:

- Yang Amat Mulia Pengiran Anak Muhammad Abdul Haffiz
- Yang Amat Mulia Pengiran Anak Muhammad Abdul Qayyum
- Yang Amat Mulia Pengiran Anak Muhammad Abdul Razaaq
- Yang Amat Mulia Pengiran Anak Nurul Amal Ni'matullah Athirah
- Yang Amat Mulia Pengiran Anak Nurul Amal Munjiatul Athirah

== Honours ==
On 21 March 1981, Yang Amat Mulia Pengiran Sura Negara, the Cheteria title, was granted. He was given the following honours:

=== National ===
- Family Order of Laila Utama (DK; 1985) – Dato Laila Utama
- Sultan Hassanal Bolkiah Medal First Class (PHBS)
- Proclamation of Independence Medal (1997)
- Sultan of Brunei Silver Jubilee Medal (5 October 1992)
- National Day Silver Jubilee Medal (23 February 2009)

=== Foreign ===
- Selangor:
  - Sultan Salahuddin Silver Jubilee Medal (3 September 1985)
