= List of Bruneian royal consorts =

Royal consorts of Brunei are women that have been married to the Sultan of Brunei. Sultans have historically practised polygyny meaning they have had multiple wives at the same time.

The consort may be crowned as the Raja Isteri (Queen Consort) if they are Malay and descended from a previous Sultan of Brunei or another Muslim monarch. If they are appointed to this role their full style and title is Kebawah Duli Yang Maha Mulia Paduka Seri Baginda Raja Isteri followed by their given name.

The consort is titled Pengiran Isteri (Princess Consort) if they are not crowned or if they are not Malay or descended from a previous Sultan and therefore ineligible to be crowned as the queen consort. Their full style and title is Duli Yang Teramat Mulia Pengiran Isteri followed by their given name.

The titles of the Sultan's consorts are outlined in the constitution but it is ultimately at the discretion of the Sultan. The Bruneian royal court does not fully translate the titles, instead using Her Majesty Raja Isteri for the queen consort and Her Royal Highness Pengiran Isteri for the princess consort.

== Consorts of the Sultan of Brunei ==
Picture	Name	Title	Birth	Marriage	Became Consort	Ceased to be Consort	Death	Spouse
-	Tengah	Pengiran Isteri	-	-	-	September 1924 her death	September 1924	Muhammad Jamalul Alam II
	Siti Fatimah binti Omar Ali	Raja Isteri	-	-	-	19 September 1924 husband's death	7 March 1947	Muhammad Jamalul Alam II
-	Kadayang Amas binti Ampuan Salleh	-	-	-	-	4 June 1950 husband's death	-	Ahmad Tajuddin
	Raihani binti Sultan Ala’eddin Sulaiman Shah	Tengku Ampuan	11 October 1911	30 April 1934	30 April 1934 marriage	4 June 1950 husband's death	22 September 1993	Ahmad Tajuddin
	Damit binti Abdul Rahman	Raja Isteri	1924	6 September 1941	6 June 1951 husband's accession	5 October 1967 husband's abdication	13 September 1979	Omar Ali Saifuddien III
	Saleha binti Mohamed Alam	Raja Isteri	7 October 1946	29 July 1965	5 October 1967 husband's accession	Incumbent	-	Hassanal Bolkiah
	Mariam Abdul Aziz	Pengiran Isteri	1955	28 October 1981	28 October 1981 marriage	2 February 2003 divorce	-	Hassanal Bolkiah
-	Azrinaz Mazhar Hakim	Pengiran Isteri	23 September 1979	20 August 2005	20 August 2005 marriage	16 June 2010 divorce	-	Hassanal Bolkiah

== See also ==
- House of Bolkiah
- List of sultans of Brunei
- Order of precedence in Brunei
- Malay styles and titles in Brunei
- Succession to the Bruneian throne
