= Princess Nor Ehsani of Brunei =

Princess of Brunei

Nor Ehsani نور إيهسني
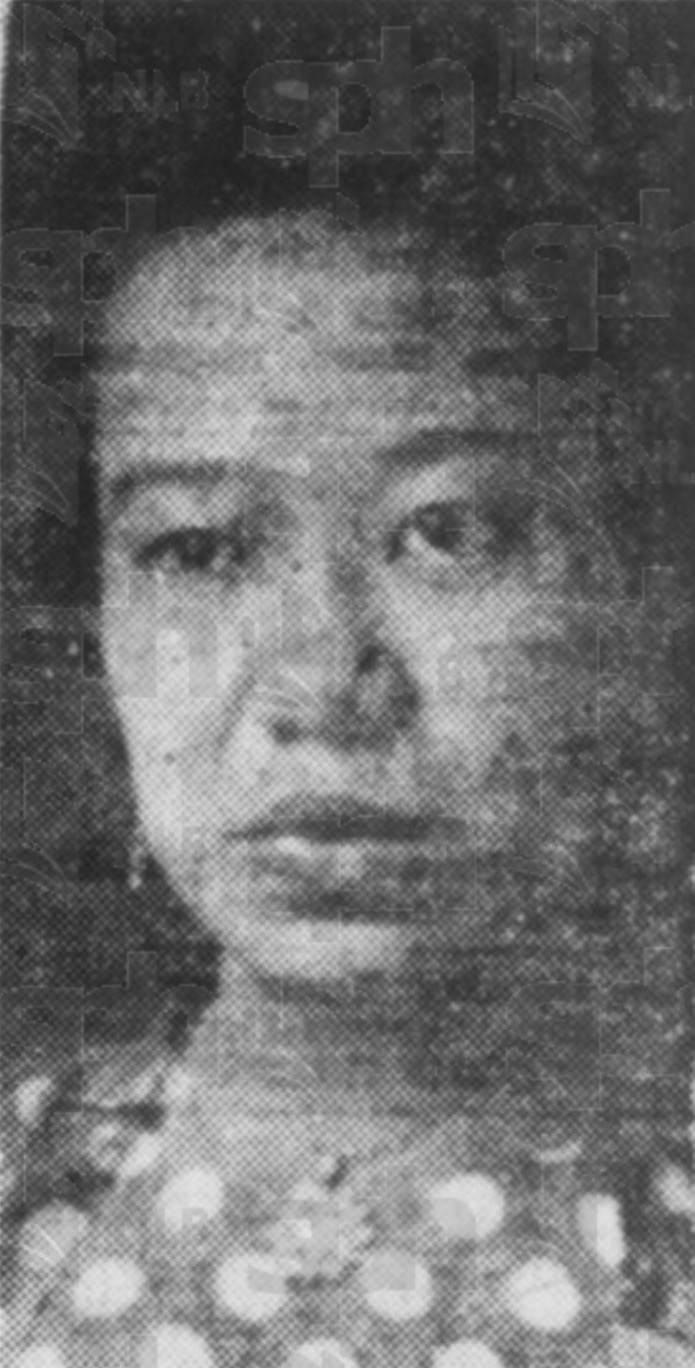
- Princess Nor Ehsani c. 1950
- Born: Niswanil Ehsanil Burniah binti Sultan Ahmad Tajuddin; 22 October 1938 (age 88); Klang, Selangor, British Malaya
- Spouse: Tengku Pengiran bin Abdul Aziz
- Issue: Tengku Putera Muhammad Fawzy; Tengku Putera Amir Farouk; Tengku Putera Muhammad Harris Fadzillah
- House: Bolkiah
- Father: Ahmad Tajuddin
- Mother: Raihani binti Sulaiman Shah
- Religion: Sunni Islam

Nor Ehsani binti Ahmad Tajuddin (born 22 October 1938) is a member of the Bruneian royal family. She is the only child of Sultan Ahmad Tajuddin and Raja Isteri Tengku Raihani.

== Early life ==
Princess Nor Ehsani was born on 15 October 1935 in Klang, Selangor, Federated Malay States to Sultan Ahmad Tajuddin of Brunei and Raja Isteri Tengku Raihani. She is the only gahara (pure descendant) of Sultan Ahmad Tajuddin but she has three half sisters from her father's marriage to a non-royal woman.

Through her mother, Princess Nor Ehsani is also a member of the Selangor royal family as the granddaughter of Sultan Sulaiman of Selangor. Following the death of her father in 1950, she and her mother temporarily resided in Kuching, Sarawak before relocating to Selangor.

== Marriage and issue ==
Princess Nor Ehsani married her first cousin, Tengku Pengiran bin Tengku Abdul Aziz, a grandson of Sultan Sulaiman of Selangor. The couple have three sons, each of whom bears the style Yang Mulia and the title Tengku Putera / Tengku Puteri, a designation reserved for Princess Nor Ehsani's descendants and comparable to the Bruneian title Pengiran Muda and Pengiran Anak.

- Tengku Putera Muhammad Fawzy
- Tengku Putera Amir Farouk
  - Tengku Amir Falique
  - Tengku Amir Fareed
  - Tengku Noor Amany Amalyna
  - Tengku Muhammad Haziq
- Tengku Putera Hariz Fadzillah
  - Tengku Putera Amar Faris
  - Tengku Putera Aiman
  - Tengku Puteri Amal Farizah
  - Tengku Putera Alif Izzat
  - Tengku Putera Adam
  - Tengku Putera Adi Nabil
  - Tengku Putera Arif
  - Tengku Putera Danial

Princess Nor Ehsani and her family lived in Brunei in a house provided by the government. In February 1967, her electricity was turned off because she refused to pay the bill for two years. She thought that it should be paid for by the government as a member of the royal family. They currently reside in Kampong Sungai Hanching, Jalan Muara, Bandar Seri Begawan.

== Succession to the throne ==
Sultan Ahmad Tajuddin of Brunei died on 4 June 1950 leaving only female issue, which meant that they could not inherit the throne. On 1 June, three days prior to his death, the Sultan signed a royal decree written by Gerard MacBryan appointing Princess Nor Ehsani as his successor and MacBryan as her guardian since she was only fourteen years old. It is thought that MacBryan planned to marry the princess and establish himself as sultan.

The British government in Brunei led by Malcolm MacDonald, Anthony Abell, and Eric Ernest Falk Pretty instead supported the succession of the sultan's younger brother Omar Ali Saifuddien III who had been appointed as the first Wazir on 15 July 1947. Omar Ali Saifuddien was crowned as the Sultan of Brunei on 31 May 1951.

=== Tengku descendants in Brunei ===
Princess Nor Ehsani's maternal ancestry connects the royal houses of Brunei and Selangor. Her mother, Tengku Raihani, was a daughter of Sultan Ala'eddin Sulaiman Shah of Selangor. A historical study records Nor Ehsani at birth as “Tengku Norehsani”. Tengku is an inherited Malay royal title and is the spelling used by the royal family of Selangor.

A genealogical account identifies Nor Ehsani's three sons as Tengku Putera Muhammad Fawzy, Tengku Putera Amir Farouk and Tengku Putera Muhammad Harris Fadzillah. Another genealogical account uses the forms Tengku Putera and Tengku Puteri for two of her grandchildren.

== Royal duties ==
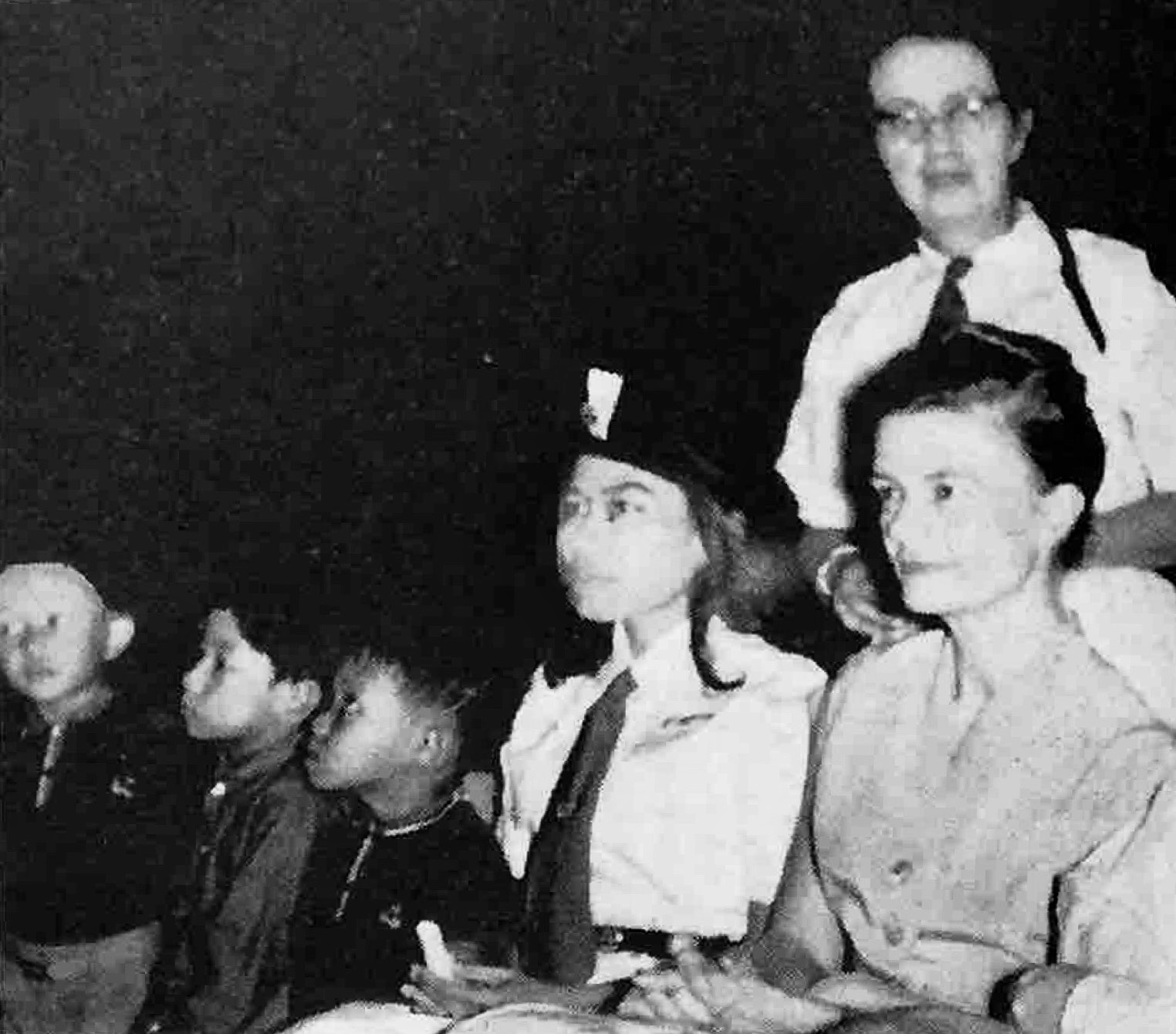
Nor Ehsani (center) at an event for the Girl Guides in 1964

Princess Nor Ehsani attends official events along with other members of the royal family. She also frequently accompanies Queen Saleha in performing royal duties.

Nor Ehsani served as the state commissioner of the newly reestablished Girl Guides Association of Brunei Darussalam from 1964 to 1970. In 2006, Queen Saleha presented her with a certificate of appreciation on behalf of the Girl Guides on their 55th anniversary.

== Titles, styles, and honours ==
Her full style and title is Yang Teramat Mulia Paduka Seri Pengiran Anak Puteri Nor Ehsani binti Sultan Ahmad Tajuddin Akhazul Khairi Waddien.

=== Honours ===
==== National ====
- Family Order of Laila Utama (DK) – Dato Laila Utama
- Family Order of Seri Utama (DK; 23 September 1963) – Dato Seri Utama
- Sultan of Brunei Silver Jubilee Medal (5 October 1992)
- Sultan of Brunei Golden Jubilee Medal (5 October 2017)

==== Foreign ====
- Malaysia
  - Recipient of the 11th Yang di-Pertuan Agong Installation Medal (23 September 1999)
- Selangor
  - Recipient of the Sultan Sharafuddin Silver Jubilee Medal (25 October 2026)
