= Tengku Raihani =

Queen of Brunei from 1934 to 1950

Raihani ريحانا
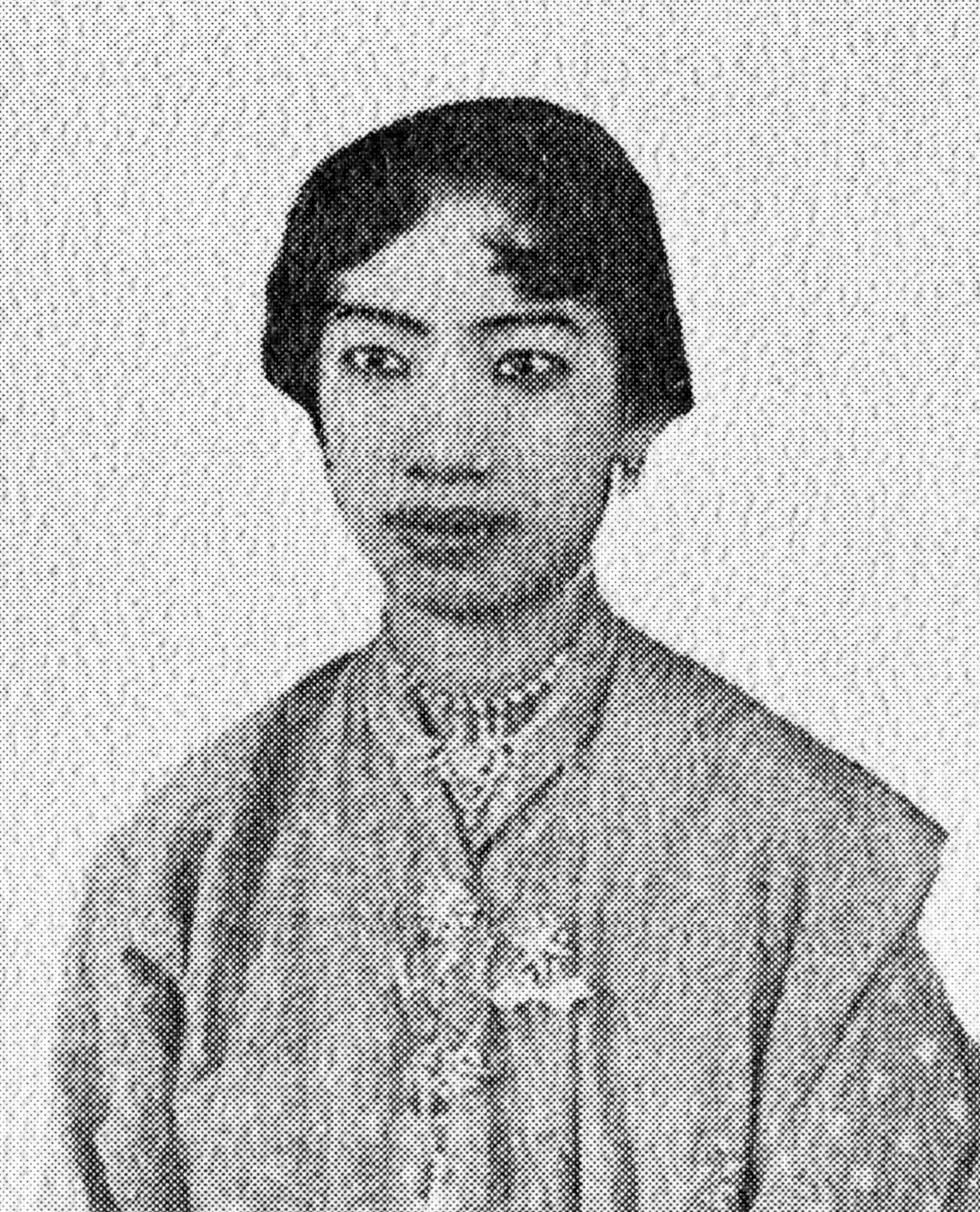
- Tengku Raihani in 1934

Queen consort of Brunei
- Tenure: 30 April 1934 – 4 June 1950
- Installation: 17 March 1940
- Predecessor: Pengiran Anak Siti Fatimah
- Successor: Pengiran Anak Damit
- Born: Raihani binti Ala’eddin Sulaiman Shah; 11 October 1911; Istana Bandar Temasya, Kuala Langat, Selangor
- Died: 22 September 1993 (aged 81)
- Burial: Sultan Sulaiman Mosque, Klang, Selangor, Malaysia
- Spouse: Ahmad Tajuddin (m. 1934; died 1950) Kamaluddin ibni Harun Al-Rashid (m. 1956)
- Issue: Princess Nor Ehsani
- House: Opu Daeng Chelak (by birth); Bolkiah (by marriage)
- Father: Ala’eddin Sulaiman Shah
- Mother: Maimunah binti Abdullah
- Religion: Sunni Islam

Raihani binti Sulaiman Shah (11 October 1911 – 22 September 1993) was Queen of Brunei as the wife of Sultan Ahmad Tajuddin. She was also a member of the Selangor royal family as the daughter of Sultan Sulaiman Shah.

== Early life ==
Tengku Raihani was born on 11 October 1911, at Istana Bandar Temasya in Jugra, Kuala Langat, Selangor to Sultan Sulaiman of Selangor and one of his consorts, Cik Anjung Negara Cik Puan Maimunah binti Abdullah.

== Marriages and issue ==
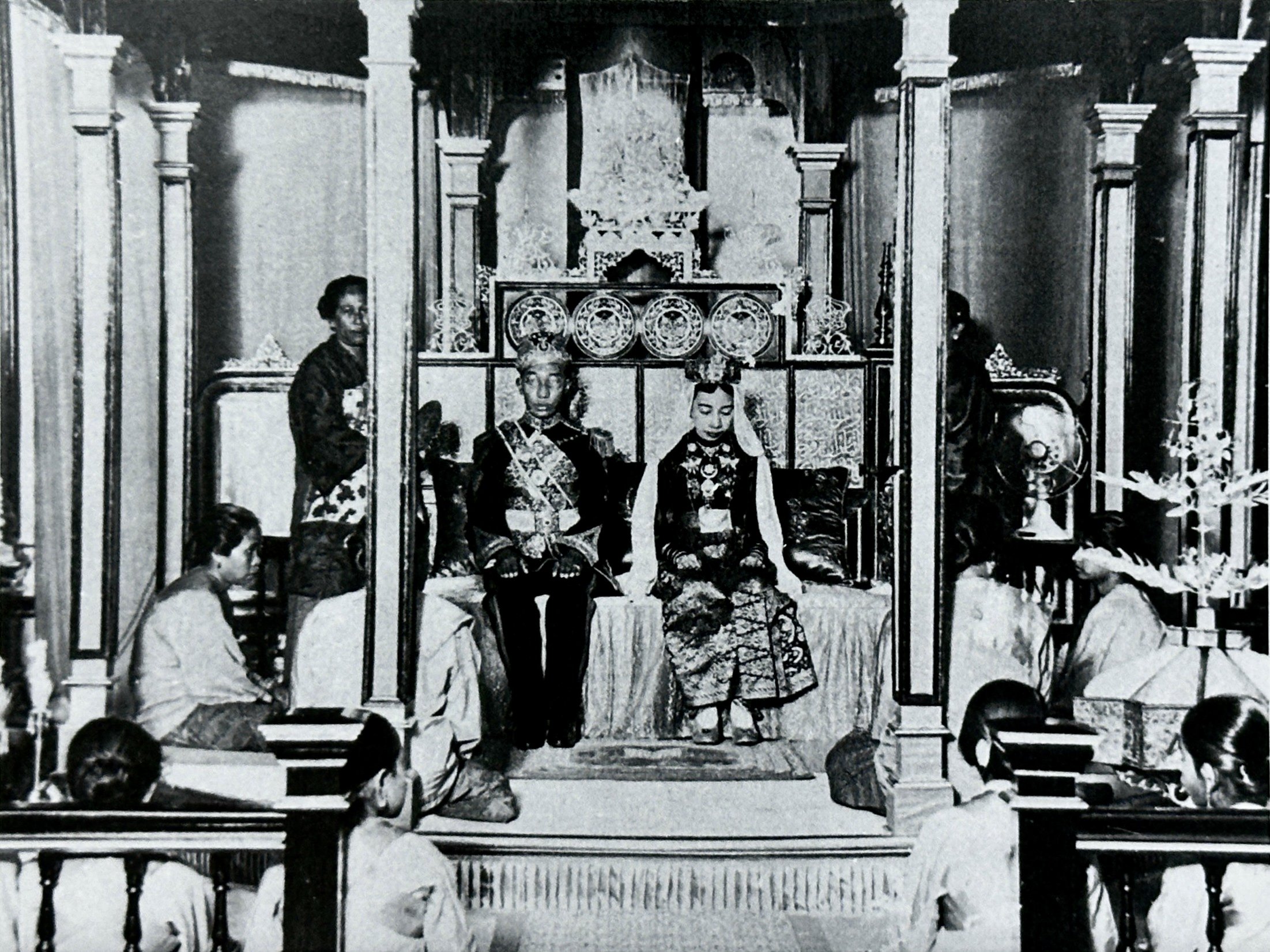
Wedding of Raihani and Ahmad Tajuddin in 1934

=== First marriage ===
In April and May of 1934, Raihani married Sultan Ahmad Tajuddin of Brunei in two weeks of elaborate ceremonies in Klang, Selangor. The Akad Nikah took place on 30 April at Sultan Sulaiman Mosque and the Bersanding ceremony took place on 6 May at Istana Mahkota Puri.

Their daughter, Princess Nor Ehsani was born on 15 October 1935 in Klang.

=== Second marriage ===
On 18 August 1956, Raihani married Raja Kamaluddin ibni Raja Harun Al-Rashid, a member of the Perak royal family, at Istana Bukit Kota in Klang.

== Queen consort ==
Tengku Raihani served as the Queen consort of Brunei from the date of her marriage in 1934 until her husband died in 1950. She was given the title of Tengku Ampuan Brunei similar to how the royal consort of the Sultan of Selangor is titled as opposed to using Raja Isteri like other Bruneian royal consorts.

On 17 March 1940, Raihani was crowned along with her husband at Istana Mahkota in Kampong Tumasek. Her tenure came to an end after the sudden death of Sultan Ahmad Tajuddin in Singapore on 4 June 1950.

== Death ==
Tengku Raihani died on 22 September 1993 from Kidney cancer. She was laid to rest in the Royal Mausoleum of Sultan Sulaiman Mosque in Klang, Selangor.

Royal titles
Preceded by Pengiran Anak Siti Fatimah	Queen consort of Brunei; 1934–1950	Succeeded by Pengiran Anak Damit
