= Queen Damit of Brunei =

Queen of Brunei from 1950 to 1967

Damit داميت
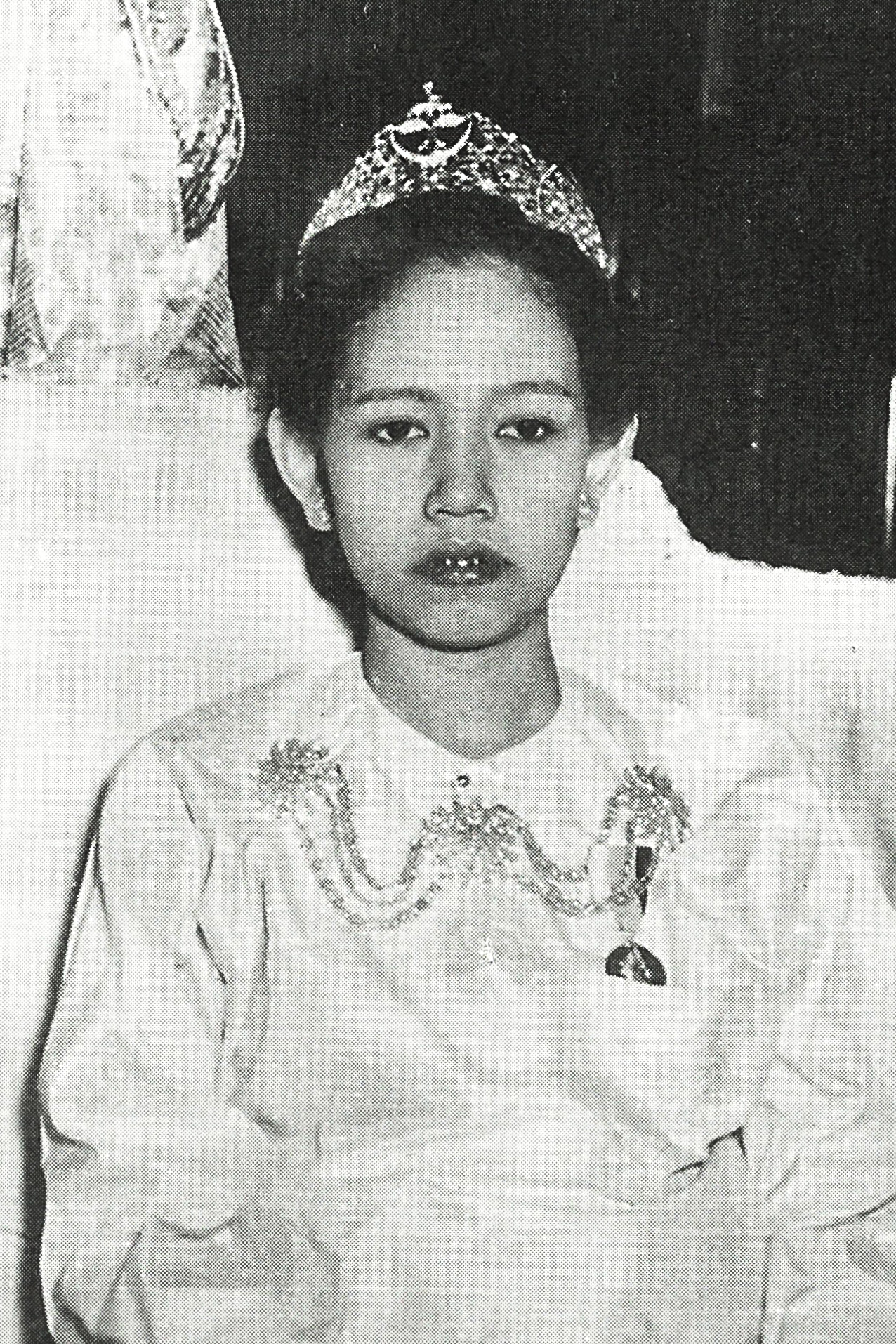
- Queen Damit in 1951

Queen consort of Brunei
- Tenure: 4 June 1950 – 5 October 1967
- Installation: 31 May 1951
- Predecessor: Tengku Raihani
- Successor: Pengiran Anak Saleha
- Born: 1924; Kampong Masjid Lama, Brunei Town, Brunei
- Died: 13 September 1979 (aged 55); Istana Darussalam, Bandar Seri Begawan, Brunei
- Burial: 14 September 1979; Royal Mausoleum, Bandar Seri Begawan, Brunei
- Spouse: Omar Ali Saifuddien III (m. 1941)
- Issue: List: Sultan Hassanal Bolkiah; Prince Mohamed Bolkiah; Princess Masna; Princess Nor'ain; Prince Sufri Bolkiah; Prince Jefri Bolkiah; Princess Amal Umi Kalthum Al-Islam; Princess Amal Rakiah; Princess Amal Nasibah; Princess Amal Jefriah
- House: Bolkiah
- Father: Abdul Rahman ibni Omar Ali Junied
- Mother: Fatimah binti Hassan
- Religion: Sunni Islam

Damit binti Abdul Rahman (1924 – 13 September 1979) was Queen of Brunei as the wife of Omar Ali Saifuddien III, the 28th Sultan of Brunei.

== Early life ==
Queen Damit was born in 1924 in Kampong Masjid Lama, Brunei Town to Pengiran Bendahara Sri Maharaja Permasuara Pengiran Anak Abdul Rahman ibni Pengiran Bendahara Pengiran Muda Omar Ali Junied and Pengiran Fatimah binti Radin Hassan. She was the great-granddaughter of Sultan Hashim Jalilul Alam Aqamaddin.

Her father was a Vizier and served as Pengiran Bendahara for 25 years from 1918 until his death during the Japanese occupation.

Damit was educated privately with other royal children at the palace. She was the oldest child and her siblings include Pengiran Anak Mohamed Alam, Pengiran Anak Omar Ali, Pengiran Anak Siti Kula, Pengiran Anak Mohammad, and Pengiran Muda Hashim.

== Marriage and issue ==
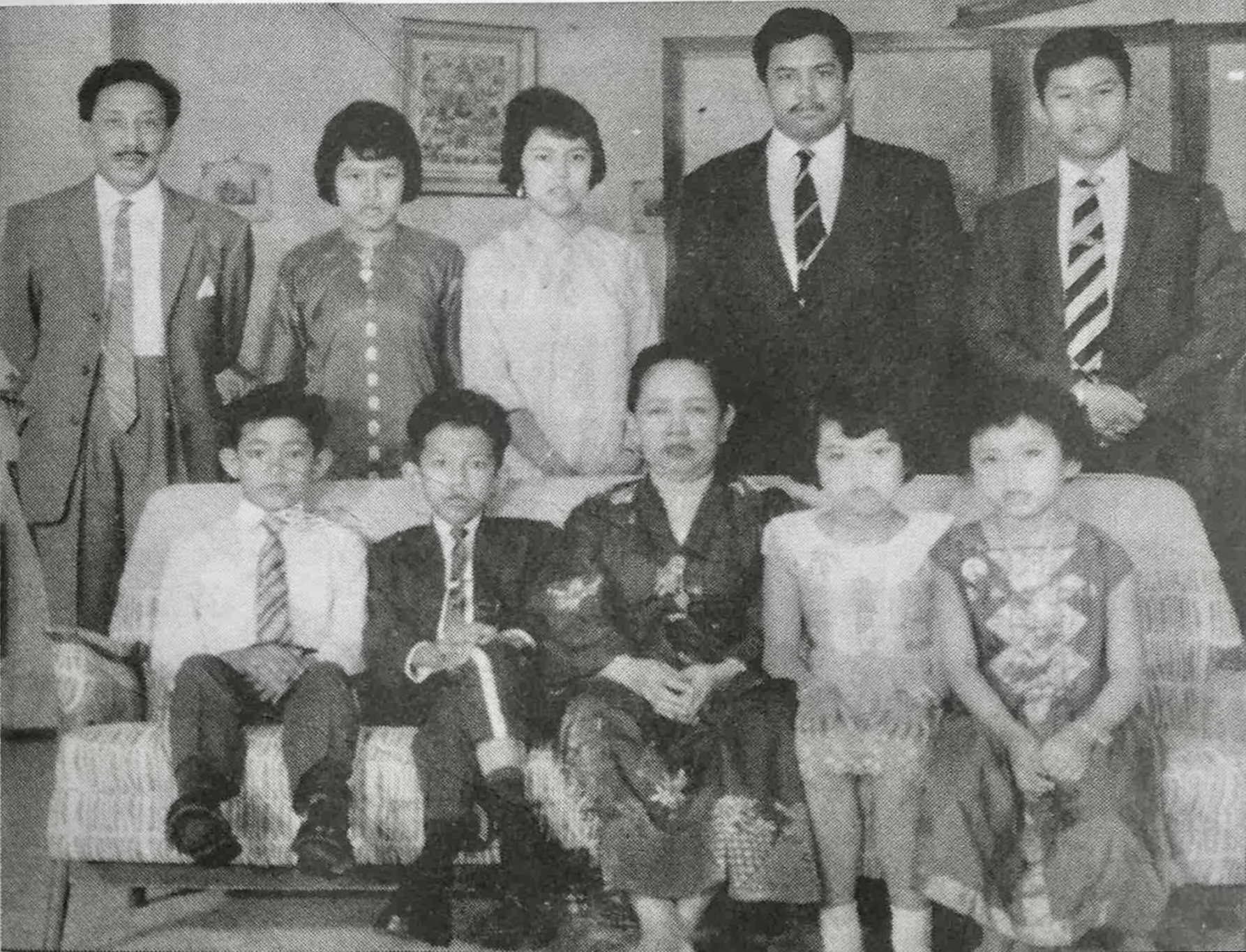
Queen Damit with her family in 1965

In September 1941, Damit married her cousin, Sultan Omar Ali Saifuddien III at Istana Banderung Kayangan. They had ten children.

- Sultan Hassanal Bolkiah (born 15 July 1946)
- Prince Mohamed Bolkiah (born 27 August 1947)
- Princess Masna (born 6 September 1948)
- Princess Nor'ain (born 14 May 1950)
- Prince Sufri Bolkiah (born 31 July 1951)
- Prince Jefri Bolkiah (born 6 November 1954)
- Princess Amal Umi Kalthum Al-Islam (born 17 February 1956)
- Princess Amal Rakiah (born 8 April 1957)
- Princess Amal Nasibah (born 26 October 1960)
- Princess Amal Jefriah (born 7 August 1963)

== Royal duties ==
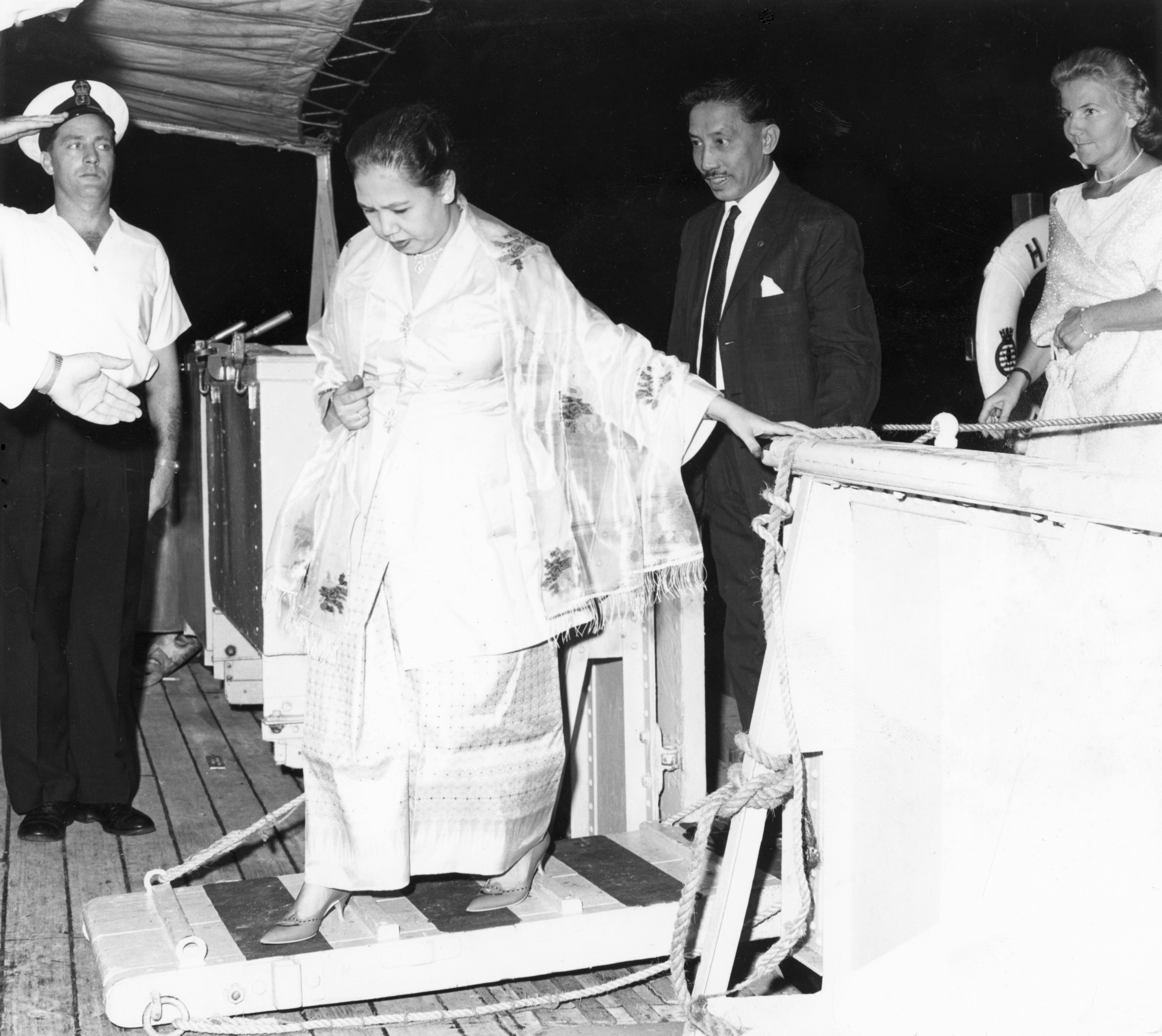
Queen Damit and her husband onboard HMS Puncheston in 1965

The Duchess of Kent and Prince Edward with the Royal Family of Brunei (21 October 1952). From left to right: Queen Damit, Prince Edward, Princess Marina, Princess Masna, Sultan Omar Ali Saifuddien III, Prince Hassanal Bolkiah, and Prince Mohamed Bolkiah during the official royal visit to Brunei Town

The Japanese Army would land in Kuala Belait six months after her wedding, resulting in the Japanese occupation of Brunei. Throughout her position, she had raised awareness on issues faced by the community and residents of the country. Her public image was well received among the general public, especially women, after she tagged alongside her husband to several state visits as a government official.

On 15 July 1947, Damit's husband became a wazir which put more responsibilities on her. On 6 June 1951, she was given the title Paduka Seri Baginda Raja Isteri following her husband's accession to the throne of Brunei. On 15 May 1958, she officially opened the Raja Isteri Fatimah Malay School. In February 1965, her husband alongside her visited HMS Puncheston (M1174). In conjunction to the visit of Earl Mountbatten later that month, she attended the celebration at Istana Darul Hana. Pengiran Anak Damit became Paduka Seri Suri Begawan Raja Pengiran Anak Hajah Damit on 1 August 1968, following the abdication of her spouse in 1967. In 1972, Pengiran Anak Damit alongside her husband greeted the Duke of Edinburgh at Istana Darul Hana, while he was on a visit to Brunei. Three years later, she was present during Duchess of Kent's state visit to the country.

== Death and funeral ==
At 13:20 13 September 1979, Pengiran Anak Damit died, aged 55 years old, in Bandar Seri Begawan's Kampong Sumbiling Lama at the Istana Darussalam. The Pehin Ismail-led funeral was held at Istana Darul Hana which would last from the day she died to the following day. The death was first reported and announced in the evening by her brother, Pengiran Anak Mohammad Alam. At 11:30 on the 14th, her body was carried by three princes and her son-in-law into a hearse, which would depart for Omar Ali Saifuddien Mosque. Under the drizzling rain, the casket was carried into the mosque while waiting for the obligatory Friday prayer and funeral prayer.

There were live television broadcasting for the people, with some listening at home. Following this, all television and radio were cancelled to make way for a day of mourning. Prince Mohamed Bolkiah leading his two sisters and brothers-in-law in carrying her casket onto a unique stretcher, which would be pulled by Royal Brunei Police Force (RBPF) officers and Royal Brunei Malay Regiment (RBMR) soldiers. Through Batu Satu, her body was interred at the Royal Mausoleum. Maghrib prayer continued to be held until the 22nd. In addition, flags must be flown at half-mast for a total of 30 days since the day of her death.

Foreign leaders and government officials who had sent their condolences or in attendance were:

- Sultan Ahmad Shah, Yang di-Pertuan Agong
- Tuanku Ja'afar, Yamtuan Besar
- Abang Muhammad Salahuddin, Yang di-Pertua Negeri of Sarawak
- Abdul Rahman Ya'kub, Chief Minister of Sarawak
- Queen Elizabeth II, Queen of the United Kingdom
- Arthur Christopher Watson, British High Commissioner to Brunei
- Malcolm MacDonald, former British Commissioner-General for Southeast Asia

== Titles, styles, and honours ==
Styles of Queen Damit
- Reference style: Duli Yang Maha Mulia
- Alternative style: Her Majesty

=== Titles and styles ===
- 1924 – 6 June 1951: Yang Amat Mulia Pengiran Anak Damit binti Pengiran Anak Abdul Rahman
- 6 June 1951 – 5 October 1967: Duli Yang Maha Mulia Paduka Seri Baginda Raja Isteri Pengiran Anak Damit binti Pengiran Anak Abdul Rahman
- 5 October 1967 – 13 September 1979: Duli Yang Teramat Mulia Paduka Suri Seri Begawan Raja Pengiran Anak Damit binti Pengiran Anak Abdul Rahman

=== Honours ===
National

- Family Order of Laila Utama (DK; 31 May 1953) – Dato Laila Utama
- Sultan Hassanal Bolkiah Medal (PHBS)
- Omar Ali Saifuddin Coronation Medal (31 May 1951)

Foreign

- Sultan Ibrahim Diamond Jubilee Medal (1955)

=== Things named after her ===
- Duli Raja Isteri Pengiran Anak Damit Mosque, a mosque in Mukim Kilanas, Bandar Seri Begawan.
- Raja Isteri Pengiran Anak Damit Secondary Arab School, a religious girl school in Parit, Bandar Seri Begawan.
- Raja Isteri Girls' High School, a secondary school in Bandar Seri Begawan.
- Suri Seri Begawan Hospital, a hospital in Kuala Belait.
- Jalan Suri Begawan, a road in Tutong Camp.

Royal titles
| Preceded by Tengku Raihani | Queen consort of Brunei; 1941–1967 | Succeeded by Pengiran Anak Saleha |
