= Ahmad Tajuddin =

Sultan of Brunei from 1924 to 1950

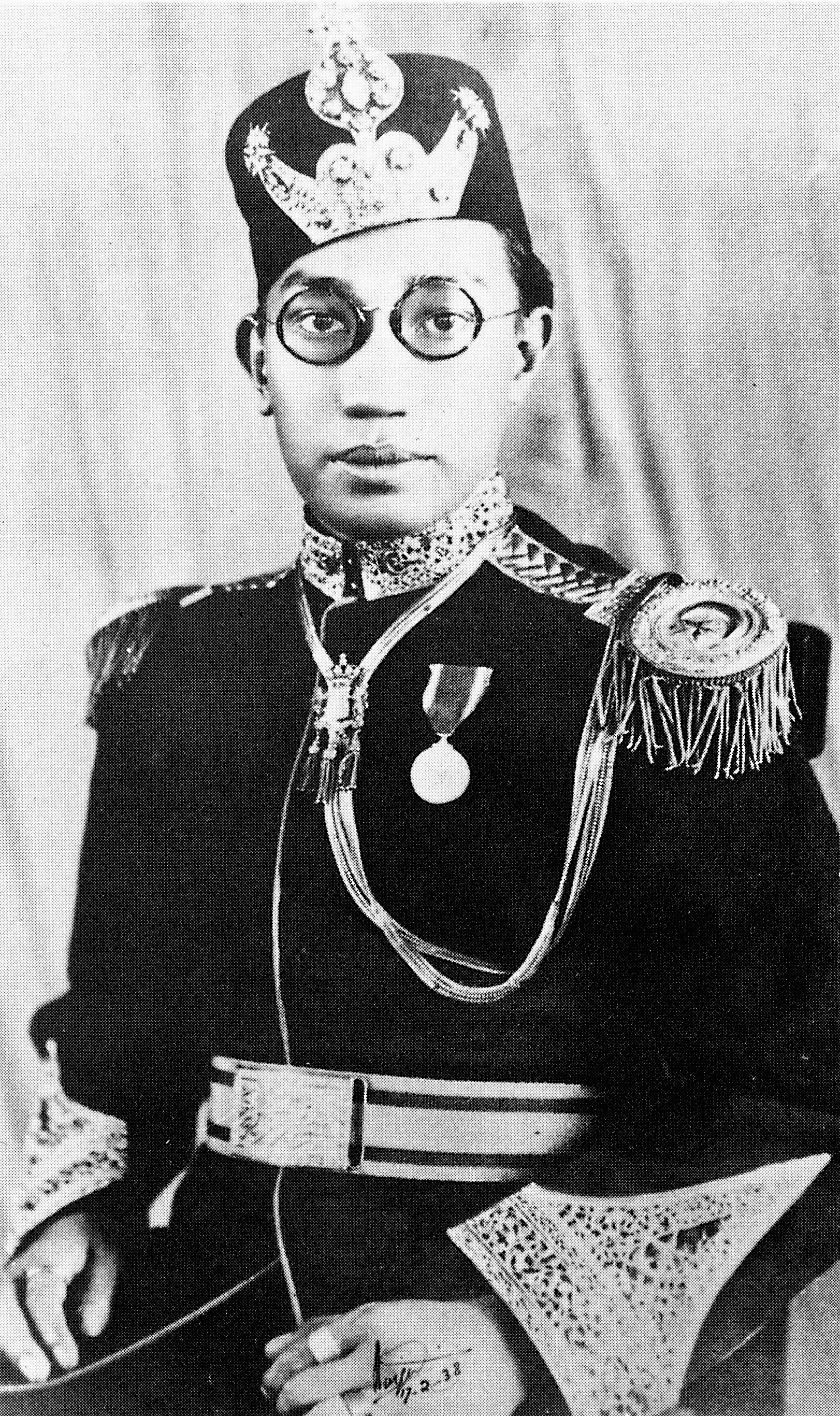
- Formal portrait, c. 1940

Sultan of Brunei
- Reign: 11 September 1924 – 4 June 1950
- Coronation: 17 March 1940
- Predecessor: Muhammad Jamalul Alam II
- Successor: Omar Ali Saifuddien III
- Born: Ahmad Tajuddin Akhazul Khairi Waddien; 22 August 1912; Istana Pekan, Brunei Town, Brunei
- Died: 4 June 1950 (aged 37); Singapore General Hospital, Colony of Singapore
- Burial: Royal Mausoleum, Bandar Seri Begawan, Brunei
- Spouses: Kadayang Amas Tengku Raihani (m. 1934)
- Issue: Pengiran Anak Siti Saerah; Pengiran Anak Siti Zubaidah; Pengiran Anak Siti Halimah; Princess Nor Ehsani
- House: Bolkiah
- Father: Muhammad Jamalul Alam II
- Mother: Pengiran Anak Fatimah
- Religion: Islam

Ahmad Tajuddin Akhazul Khairi Waddien (Note: Jawi: أحمد تاج الدين اعكاظ الخير والدين) (22 August 1912 – 4 June 1950) was the 27th Sultan of Brunei from 1924 until his death in 1950. He was succeeded by his younger brother Sultan Omar Ali Saifuddien III.

Ahmad Tajuddin has been disregarded by Malcolm MacDonald and frequently ignored and mishandled by others like his political advisor Gerard MacBryan. He advocated for the Sultanate to have more financial and political autonomy in a way that was innovative for his day. This, along with his support for a new political confederation governed by the Sultanate over northern Borneo, foreshadowed much of the political process that started in the late 1950s and culminated in January 1984 with the official declaration of Brunei's independence from Britain.

== Early life and education ==
Ahmad Tajuddin was born on 22 August 1912 (Note: Bruneian research papers list his birthdate as 22 August 1913, while historian Bob Reece states it as 2 September 1913.) at Istana Pekan in Brunei Town during the reign of his father, Sultan Muhammad Jamalul Alam II. He was his father's eldest son through his royal consort, Raja Isteri Pengiran Anak Siti Fatimah. Ahmad Tajuddin's older brother, Pengiran Muda Bongsu had died in 1910. His younger brother, Pengiran Muda Omar Ali Saifuddien succeeded him after his death. Before becoming the sultan, he was known as Pengiran Muda Besar Ahmad Tajuddin.

He received his early education in the palace prior attending formal school. One of the teachers who had been assigned to teach him was Cikgu Salleh Haji Masri. Salleh Haji Masri was one of the famous freedom fighters with anti-colonial sentiments. Ahmad Tajuddin sailed for England, United Kingdom in 1932. According to reports, his mother obstructed the efforts of British Resident Eric Ernest Falk Pretty to transfer him to Malaya or England for his education; nonetheless, he started receiving English instruction from a specially assigned British instructor at the age of fourteen. He had learned English from Mr. H.F. Stalley. He was in England for a year to learn the English language and a description of the western civilisation. He was the first sultan in history to explore the western world more than his father, who had only sailed to Singapore and Labuan.

== Reign ==
=== Early reign ===
Ahmad Tajuddin was eleven years old when he ascended to the throne as Yang di-Pertuan on 11 September 1924, (Note: Sources have reported his date of succession as 21 September 1924.) following the untimely death of his father at the age of 35. Although his father's official cause of death was listed as malaria, there was no formal inquiry held, and there were strong rumours that he had been poisoned by a close relative. An important historical point is that Brunei began exploring for oil during the rule of Ahmad Tajuddin, and in April 1929, an oil well in Seria was found, providing the country with income. This was acknowledged by the British Government, which resulted in the settling down of British Residents into Brunei.

Due to his young age of 11, the reign was temporarily held by a Council of Regency which consisted of Pengiran Bendahara Pengiran Anak Abdul Rahman and Pengiran Pemancha Pengiran Anak Haji Muhammad Yasin (also known as "the two wicked uncles") from 11 September 1924 to 19 September 1931, they served as joint Regents during his seven-year minority and were said to have had a negative influence on him along with his mother. He was supposedly given a concubine at the age of thirteen, and while he was taking English lessons from a British tutor, his mother reportedly blocked efforts to send him overseas for school. It was also said that he periodically cooked his own food in soda water out of fear of poisoning.

A lavish celebration was thrown in Brunei upon his return from England. Attendees included people from nearby Sabah and Sarawak, who continued to view him as their sultan. A traditional boat racing on the Brunei River, fireworks from Japan, and a large number of guests from other areas filled the town's residences. Large fires were built on the nearby hills, and buildings were adorned with lanterns and multicoloured lights at night, illuminating the entire town and fostering a lively, celebratory atmosphere.

=== Relations with the British Residency ===
Unlike his father, who had fiercely opposed the resident's 1909 Land Code, which affected the Kedayan minority, Ahmad Tajuddin's timidity helped to strengthen the British Resident's authority and prevented serious crises during his regency and early reign. However, his resistance was subdued by threats of deposition. Both Ahmad Tajuddin and his grandfather, Sultan Hashim, depended on foreigners to handle their business rather than his residents: Hashim relied on an independent Englishman, and Tajuddin on a Malayan private secretary and Gerard MacBryan.

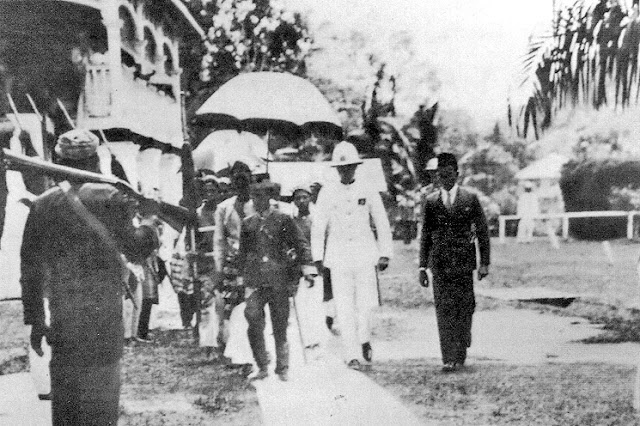
Ahmad Tajuddin and Patrick McKerron in 1930

Between 1931 and 1950, Ahmad Tajuddin expressed his discontent with Brunei's political system by frequently abstaining from State Council meetings, ostensibly opposing the resident's authority. Additionally, he appointed Inche Mohamad Hassan bin Kulop Mohamad from Selangor or Perak as his personal assistant, described by an Englishwoman as highly capable and fluent in English, thus enabling the Sultan to rely on him to carry out his wishes effectively. In October 1931, he undertook a three-week trip to Malaya, followed by an extended stay in Britain from July 1932 to August 1933, ostensibly to improve his English language skills. Ahmad Tajuddin was characterised as a tiny, bespectacled guy with long hair who drove in a luxurious Lincoln automobile and was carried in a gold and scarlet litter during formal rituals during a 1935 visit by Sir Shenton Thomas.

It wasn't until he turned eighteen on 19 September 1931, that he attained full sovereignty. Ahmad Tajuddin traveled to Peninsular Malaya from 1 to 21 October 1931, and then, in July 1932, he became the first sultan of Brunei to travel to England, where he spent around ten months, to observe the changes that had taken place there. He didn't return to Brunei until August 1933, after a protracted visit. As an honorary aide-de-camp (ADC), Pengiran Mohammad bin Pengiran Abdul Rahman Piut accompanied him on both occasions. Pengiran Anak Besar Bagol, his brother, was then named ADC.

Ahmad Tajuddin was known for his hospitality and respect towards guests, including high-ranking visitors such as Rajah Charles Vyner Brooke, whom he hosted at his own residence, Istana Mahkota, in 1934. He treated his friends and peers with generosity and equality, often giving gifts and maintaining an informal demeanour during social events, though he would subtly distance himself from those who sought to take advantage of his kindness. Despite this, he and his family began to feel uneasy with the out distribution of Brunei's wealth from oil exports and for that reason, he encouraged the British government to ease financial regulations for the people of Brunei. In an attempt to suppress the sultan, his living allowance was raised from $1,000 to $1,500 in 1934, and again was again given an increase of $500 a month in 1938. The Government of the United Kingdom gifted him a car in 1939.

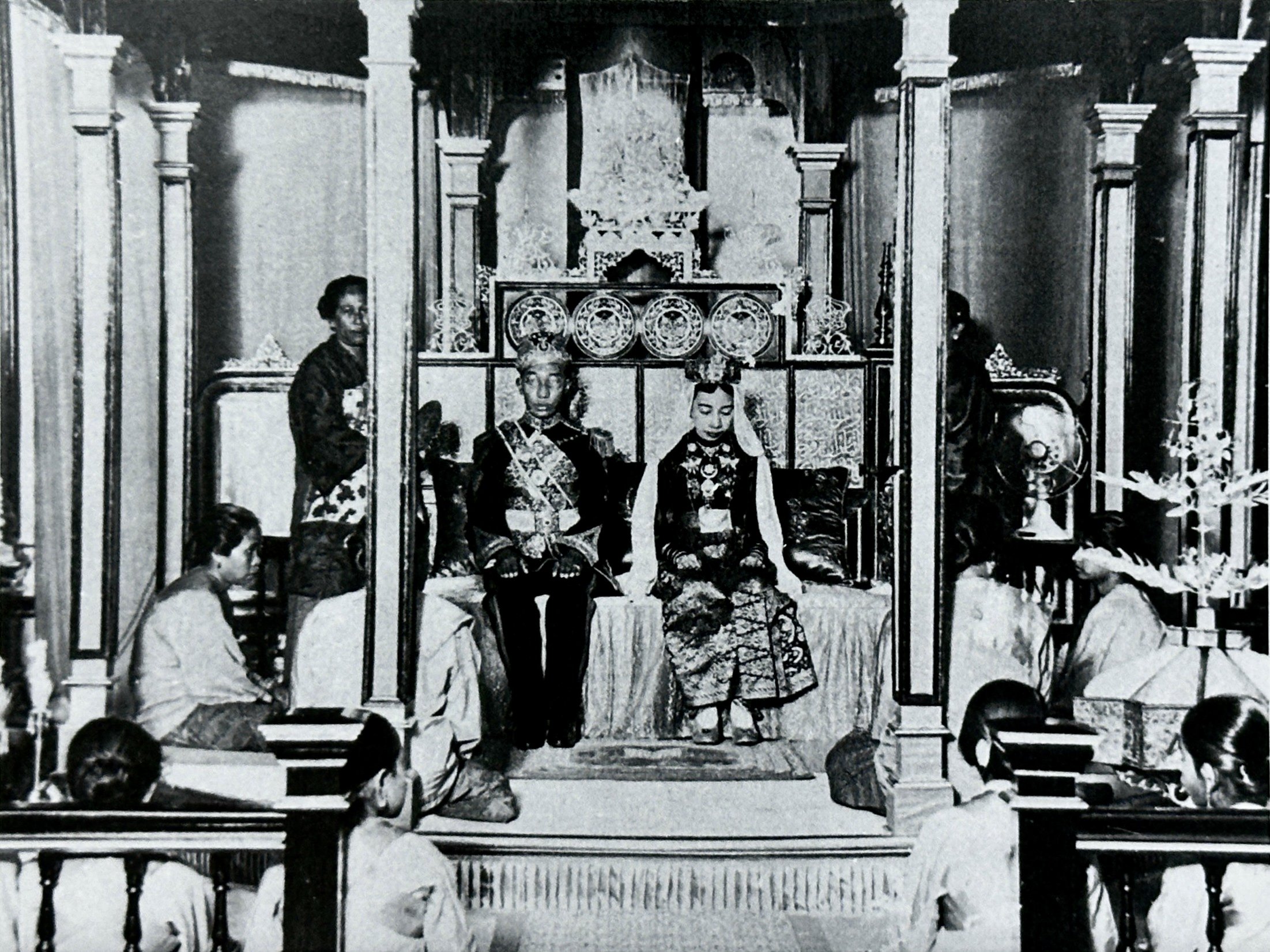
Ahmad Tajuddin and Tengku Ampuan Raihani at the royal engagement ceremony in 1934 at Istana Mahkota Puri

Following the royal conventions of both Brunei and Selangor, he married Tengku Raihani, the daughter of Sultan of Selangor, Alauddin Sulaiman Shah, in a ceremony performed in Istana Mahkota Puri, Klang, on 30 April 1934. Masjid Jami'ah Al-Rahmah in Klang hosted his akad nikah (marriage contract). He was escorted by his mother, brother, public officials, and a royal guard. He visited Klang once more in October, having returned to Brunei in July. Tengku Raihani accompanied him when he returned to Brunei in November 1934, and they were greeted with great fanfare. This marriage improved relations between the Bruneian and Selangor royal dynasties. She would later be crowned on 15 October 1935, and carried the name Tengku Ampuan Raihani.

Early in August 1935, 23-year-old Ahmad Tajuddin was spotted by Thomas, the newly appointed Commissioner for the Federated Malay States, on his visit to Brunei. Thomas spoke about the sultan's stately entry in a sumptuous red and gold litter carried by thirty men, as well as the reception hall's simple design that used cheap items like Brunei cigarettes and German carpets. He had to deal with his wife's defying Bruneian conventions and perhaps dangerous journey to Klang for the birth of their child at a period of intense pressure from his brother-in-law, Tengku Kelana Jaya Petra. The British Resident of Selangor offered Thomas advice and assistance, but the Selangor family persisted, and on 15 October 1935, Ahmad Tajuddin and his party flew to Klang, where their daughter Princess (Tengku) Nor Ehsani was born.

By 1936, there had been several arguments between Ahmad Tajuddin and his resident as their relationship was failing. Acting High Commissioner A. S. Small observed that as the sultan became older and more self-assured, he became more and more problematic. After previous Resident Pretty was dispatched to Brunei to resolve these difficulties and defuse tensions, the Colonial Office decided to designate more senior officers as Residents going forward. He was greeted cordially by the people of Kuala Belait on his official visit there after attending the Sultan of Selangor's golden jubilee in 1937. Later in August, once again he and his family went to Selangor to attend the golden jubilee celebration of Sultan Alauddin. On his return in December, he went for an official visit to Kuala Belait and to formally declare open a newly built Recreation Club. The visit was received with great joy by the people and the inhabitants there even people from the interior came to town to join in the celebration and to have a look at their sultan.

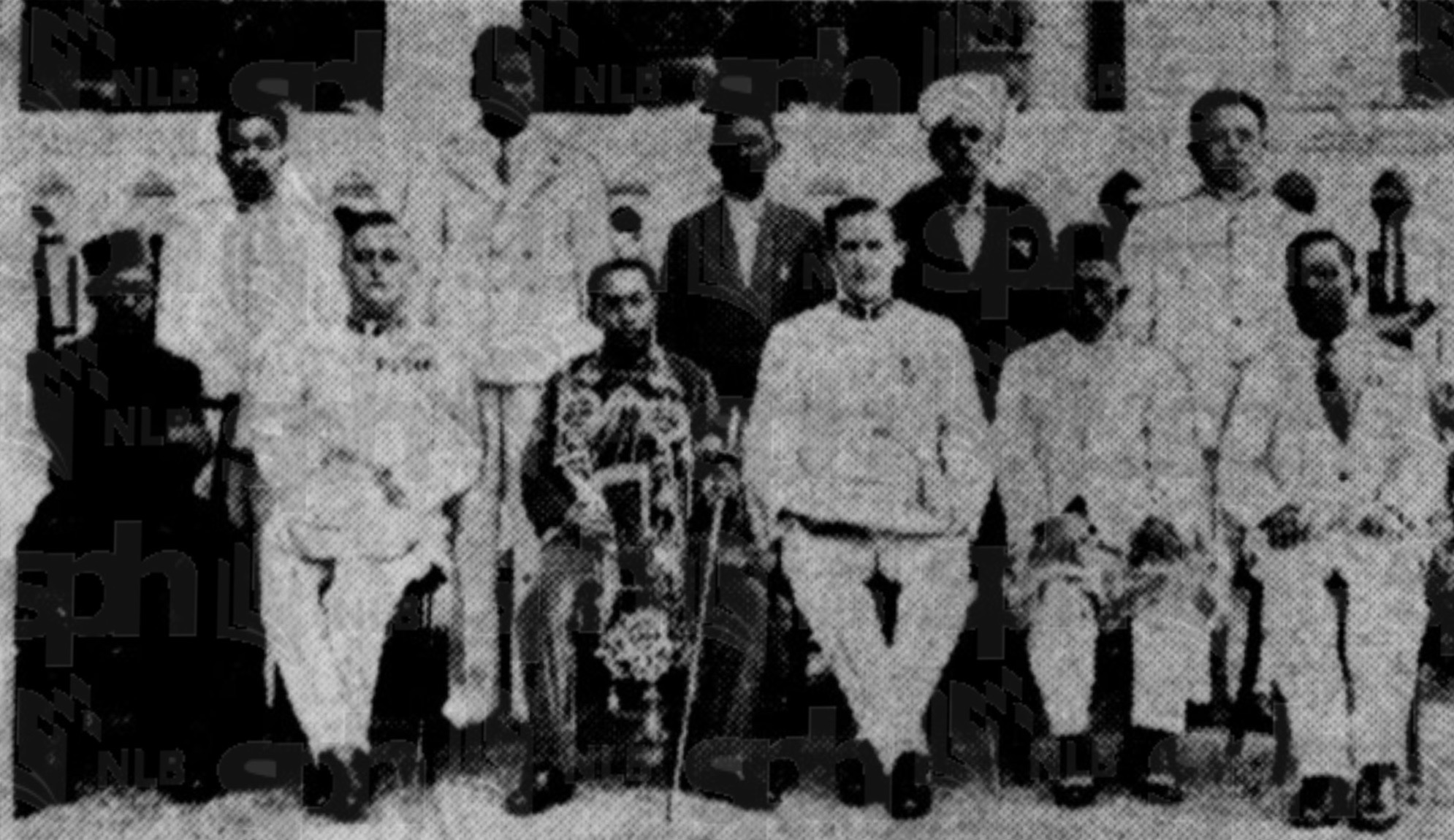
Seated from left to right: Pengiran Muda Omar Ali Saifuddien, British Resident Ernest Pengilley, Ahmad Tajuddin, R. S. Evans, Abdul Kadir Sahib and E. Rajaratnam pictured with other members of the Indo-Ceylonese community in 1940

The relationship between Ahmad Tajuddin and the British soured when John Graham Black was appointed as the British Resident in 1937. The resident attempted to postpone and sabotage his coronation ceremony and this infuriated the sultan. This caused the resident to be replaced by Ernest Edgar Pengilley on 1 January 1940. Due to the frustration that Black had caused, he was not given a farewell ceremony by the sultan as he usually did for other residents. In early 1940, Thomas wrote to MacDonald that although Tajuddin's early behaviour had been difficult and necessitated strong warnings, he had demonstrated progress in the previous five years and had no vices. While recognising the sultan's difficult childhood, Thomas also emphasised his commitment, which was exemplified in 1939 by a sizeable payment for Imperial defence. As a result, he suggested that Ahmad Tajuddin be awarded the Knight Commander of the Order of Saint Michael and Saint George (KCMG) during his coronation, since he was the only Malay ruler at the time who had not yet received a British honour. Robert Irvine, the private secretary, attended the coronation and provided a report.

=== Coronation ===
Following the official transfer of power in 1931, his coronation ceremony took place nine years after his elevation to the throne. The event began by him reciting the Qur'an at the Istana Mahkota on 9 November 1939. On Monday, 26 February 1940, the ceremony was inaugurated in the Kajang-roofed Lapau (Ceremonial Hall) by raising flags and opening the gandang jaga-jaga ceremony, signaling the, signaling the beginning of the event forty days ahead of the actual coronation ceremony. Throughout the period, traditional drumming was heard, and royal decorations were positioned along the parade path. Prior to the coronation, a variety of events were planned, such as dances, martial arts, and regional performances.

The coronation of Ahmad Tajuddin began on 17 March 1940 at 3 p.m. in the Government Office's spacious chamber, which had been prepared for the event by removing all furniture and decorating it. The yellow-painted throne from the ancient Lapau Council Chamber, complete with a dome and flags, was situated on an elevated platform at one end, accompanied by a yellow silk-covered cushioned chair. The public was standing behind, with European viewers sitting on the left and prominent Asian visitors seated on the right. A wide, railed-off path ran down the middle to prevent onlookers from intruding, and an elevated dais was placed next to the throne for government delegates.

The procession to the Coronation Hall was delayed, causing a delay in the crowning. On the verandah, delegates from Sarawak, Selangor, and British North Borneo had already gathered, and the two Wazirs had come with the sultan's crown. After it was ultimately established that the Sultan had arrived at the Lapau, the litter procession started. A jubilant audience, drums, gongs, and trumpets accompanied the Sultan, who was being carried by twenty-four men in a wooden litter painted yellow. The litter, which had a canopy attached to it, was accompanied by a sizable group of chiefs, regalia bearers, and attendants, five of whom held enormous, vividly colored candles. Throughout the parade, the Sultan, wearing a costume of white velvet with golden trimmings, was bareheaded.

The Chief Police Officer of the 24 Brunei Police commanded the guard of honour, which was positioned in front of Ahmad Tajuddin's litter. The sultan inspected the guard before proceeding to the office verandah, where he was greeted by delegates. The Sultan took the throne as the procession entered the Coronation Hall. An elevated dais was used by the delegates, which included the British Resident. Chiefs, regalia bearers, and attendants arranged themselves around the throne. The Sultan's right and left Wazir were Pengiran Bendahara Pengiran Anak Abdul Rahman and Pengiran Pemancha Pengiran Anak Haji Muhammad Yasin, respectively, were displayed on the platform next to the throne, with the ADC next to the Pemancha. Armored at each corner of the platform were bearers of regalia who carried a variety of ceremonial items, including as weapons and a brazen lion and arm. With a drawn sword resting on his own chest, an attendant knelt before the Sultan. The Pengiran Shahbandar and the principal chiefs faced the platform, which was surrounded by attendants and regalia bearers. Massive candlesticks were positioned at each corner of the platform and behind the throne.

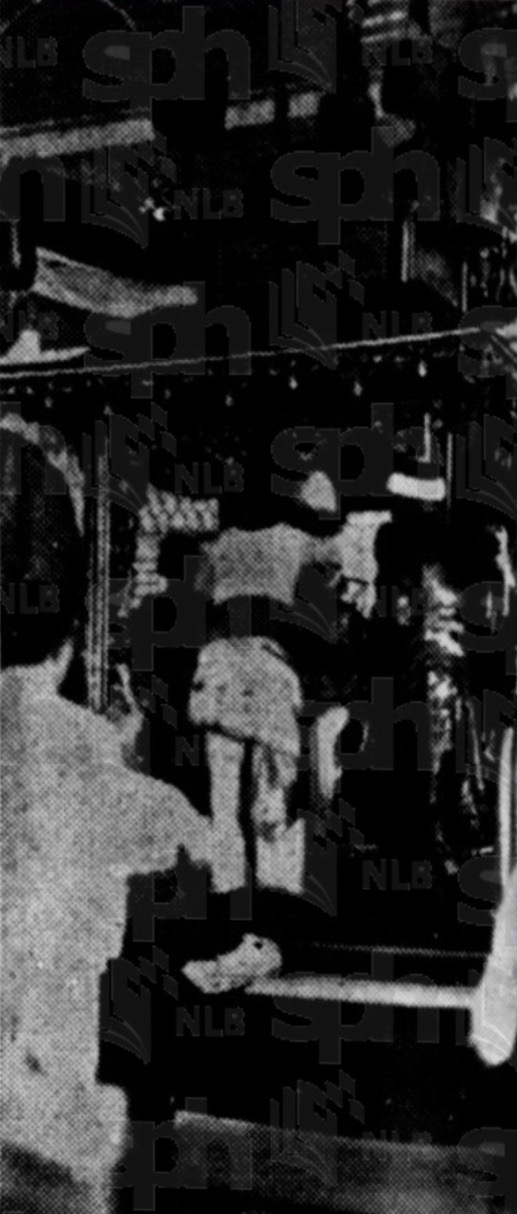
Ahmad Tajuddin being crowned by the Pengiran Bendahara

The Sultan was crowned by the Pengiran Bendahara wearing a newly fashioned yellow songkok embellished with white plume, diamonds, and gold. The Pengiran Bendahara received the crown from the Pengiran and gave it to the Pengiran Pemancha, who in turn gave it to the Sultan. The Pengiran Bendahara made a long declaration, clearly exhausted, and then there was a 21-gun salute as the nobat (royal band) played. Pengiran Bendahara offered sembah (tribute) and Malays surrounding the throne and in the hall waved their swords and spears, echoing the cry from those outside. There were next a few brief proclamations, each concluding with the nobat and cries of sembah.

After the 21-gun salute, a delegate came down from the dais to address the Sultan, reading letters from the High Commissioner, George Lloyd, and King George VI in English. Assistant Resident E. C. G. Barrett translated all the messages into Malay, including the announcement of the Sultan's designation as an Honorary Companion of the Order of Saint Michael and Saint George (CMG). The delegate then went back to his position on the dais after delivering the messages, which were written in Jawi, to the Sultan through his ADC. The Sultan received messages from delegates from British North Borneo, Sarawak, and Selangor. The Sultan stood in answer and read out responses to each. After then, the celebration came to a conclusion with a prayer delivered by Brunei's Dato Imam. The Sultan then left the throne and entered the hall in a procession like the one that had begun the ritual. After being returned in a litter procession to the Lapau, he got into his car and drove back to the palace.

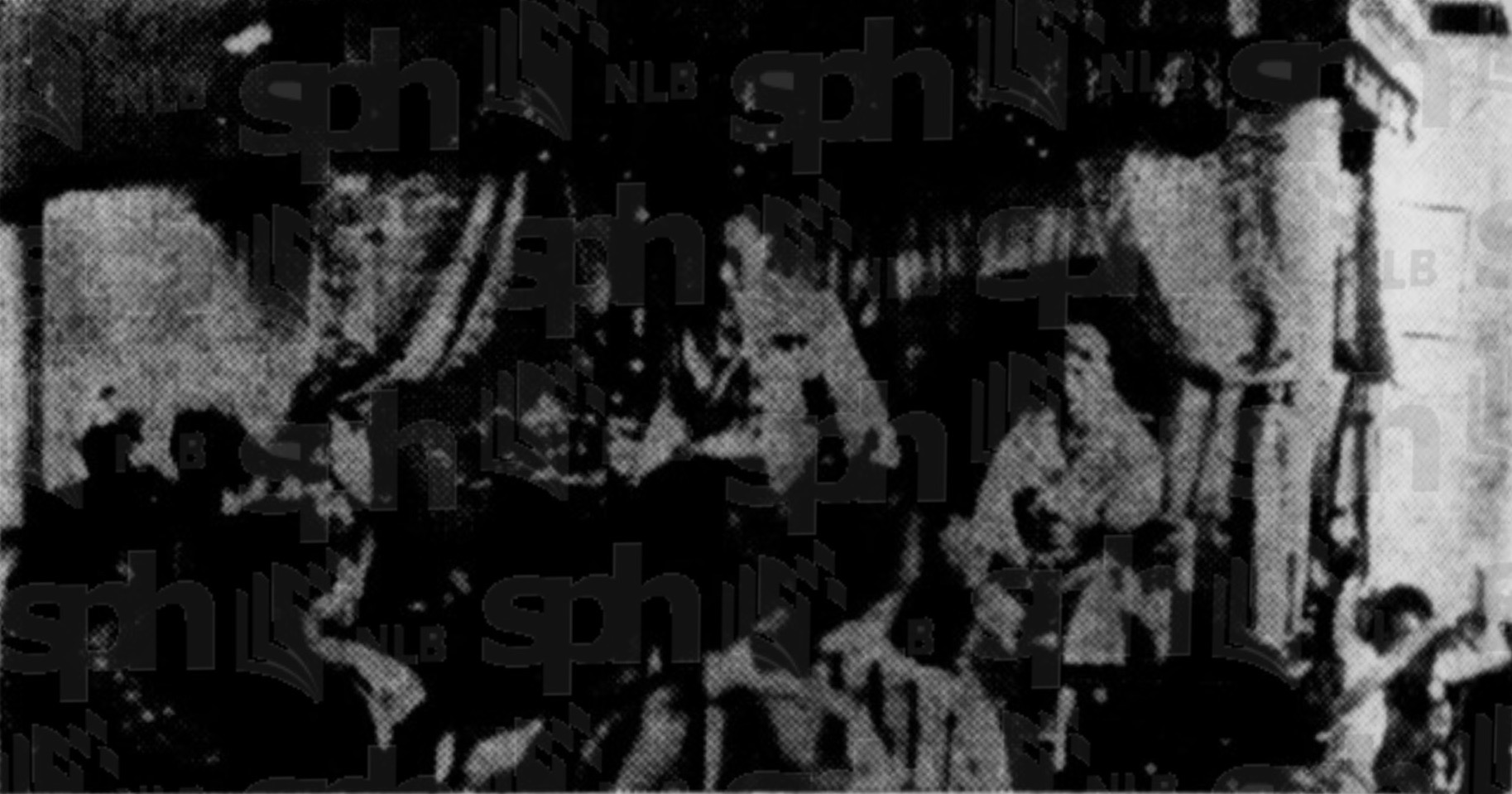
Ahmad Tajuddin and Tengku Raihani at the bersanding ceremony

There were no problems managing the gathering of thousands of well-behaved onlookers who lined the road between the Lapau and the government offices. Several hundred Malay onlookers silently observed the proceedings inside the auditorium. The ritual stayed orderly despite some shoving as participants hurried for the return procession and several persons getting oil on their clothing from the enormous candles. Many onlookers hurried to gather as souvenirs bits of white fabric that were scattered along the procession path. Following that, the Sultan and his spouse sat on seats cushioned with yellow silk for the palace's bersanding ceremony, which was attended by the invited guests. His wife, resplendent in a diamond-encrusted cream-coloured gown, stood motionless the entire time the Sultan's eldest sister conducted the sembah semua ceremonial summons.

After the bersanding ceremony, Sultan and his spouse drove around the town in a motorcade, passing through rows of onlookers that included kampong dwellers sheltered under temporary structures. Under the protection of a big yellow umbrella, the couple traveled in an open automobile. Upon arriving back to the palace, tea was given to the guests. Due to custom, the Sultan had to stay in the palace for many days following his coronation, therefore he was unable to attend the State Banquet that evening. Exhausted from the day's activities, the Pengiran Bendahara was also not present. There were remarks at the 150-person banquet wishing the Sultan and Brunei's future well.

Ahmad Tajuddin threw a dinner reception at the Astana on the evening of 18 March for dignitaries and well-known citizens who came to witness his coronation. Following the meal, he and his spouse spoke to the guests from an elevated stage. The Sultan thanked the British Resident and government officials for the seamless arrangements and thanked the delegates for attending the coronation. A guest responded by thanking the Sultan for his kindness in a brief speech in Malay. The evening closed with numerous entertainments, including ronggeng, playing silat, and Dusun dance, which delighted the audience.

=== Second World War ===
He urged the British to accept Bruneians into higher positions of the Brunei Administrative Service (BAS) in order to train and give experiences to local population. For the first time ever in 1941, 25 locals were appointed to serve in the government bureaucracy. With the help of Syed Abdul Aziz Asimi, the school's instructor, Ahmad Tajuddin opened a private Arabic school in Brunei Town in 1940 as a demonstration of his dedication to furthering Islamic education in Brunei. To promote its growth, the school was located in one of his palaces. Even though the school made great strides and its pupils had great success, it was shut down in 1942 when Brunei was occupied by the Japanese.

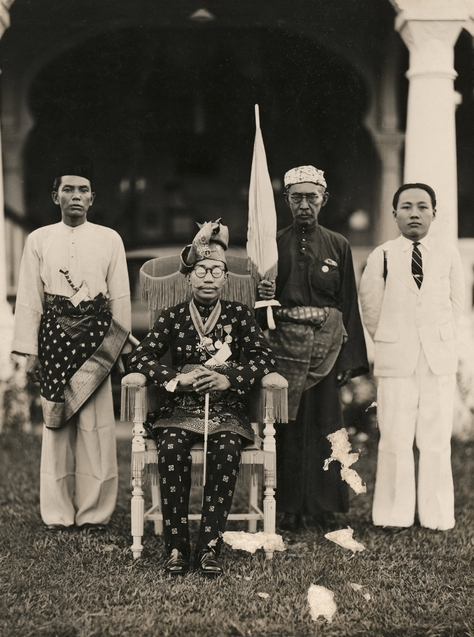
Ahmad Tajuddin and members of his court in 1941

With the likelihood of war with the Empire of Japan increasing, in 1941, the British began to encourage the establishment of local defence forces in Brunei, and neighbouring Sarawak and Borneo. Ahmad Tajuddin approved the establishment of the Brunei Volunteer Force and Special Police Force to assist the British in stopping the Japanese invasion of Brunei. An estimated 200 Bruneians initially volunteered, but by the time of the invasion few remained and no Allied troops were stationed in Brunei. The Sultan was appointed an Honorary Colonel of the force.

Ahmad Tajuddin's involvement during the Japanese occupation of Brunei, which started after surrendering to the Imperial Japanese Army's Kawaguchi Detachment on 22 December 1941, was mostly symbolic, much like the British approach of keeping local rulers in place but giving them little actual authority. The newly formed Miri province, which comprised sections of Sarawak and Brunei, was included under the Japanese administration, which reduced the Sultan's power while preserving his status as a means of gaining support from the populace. During his visit to Brunei in early 1942, Toshinari Maeda, the Japanese military governor of Miri province, was based in Kuching. He was photographed with his top officers, the Sultan, his brother, and Pengiran Pemancha Pengiran Anak Haji Muhammad Yasin.

His function in Brunei during the Japanese occupation was mostly ceremonial; the real government was controlled by the Japanese provincial governor and Inche Ibrahim bin Mohammad Jahfar, the government secretary prior to the war. Despite serving mostly as a symbolic leader, the Sultan was able to bring Labuan, as well as the districts of Limbang, Lawas, and Trusan, back under the nominal authority of Brunei. His initiative, motivated by long-standing animosity over the loss of these regions, was probably evident in this action. Pengiran Muda Omar Ali Saifuddien highlighted the significance of these regions to the Sultanate by openly calling for their restoration once he was crowned Sultan. The Japanese strategy was to maintain the support of their people by allowing the Malay rulers of Malaya and Borneo to remain in position, while denying them any actual authority. He was kept on the throne, while the Wazir and Cheteria continued in their pre–war administrative roles, but doubtless under the command of Japanese military personnel.

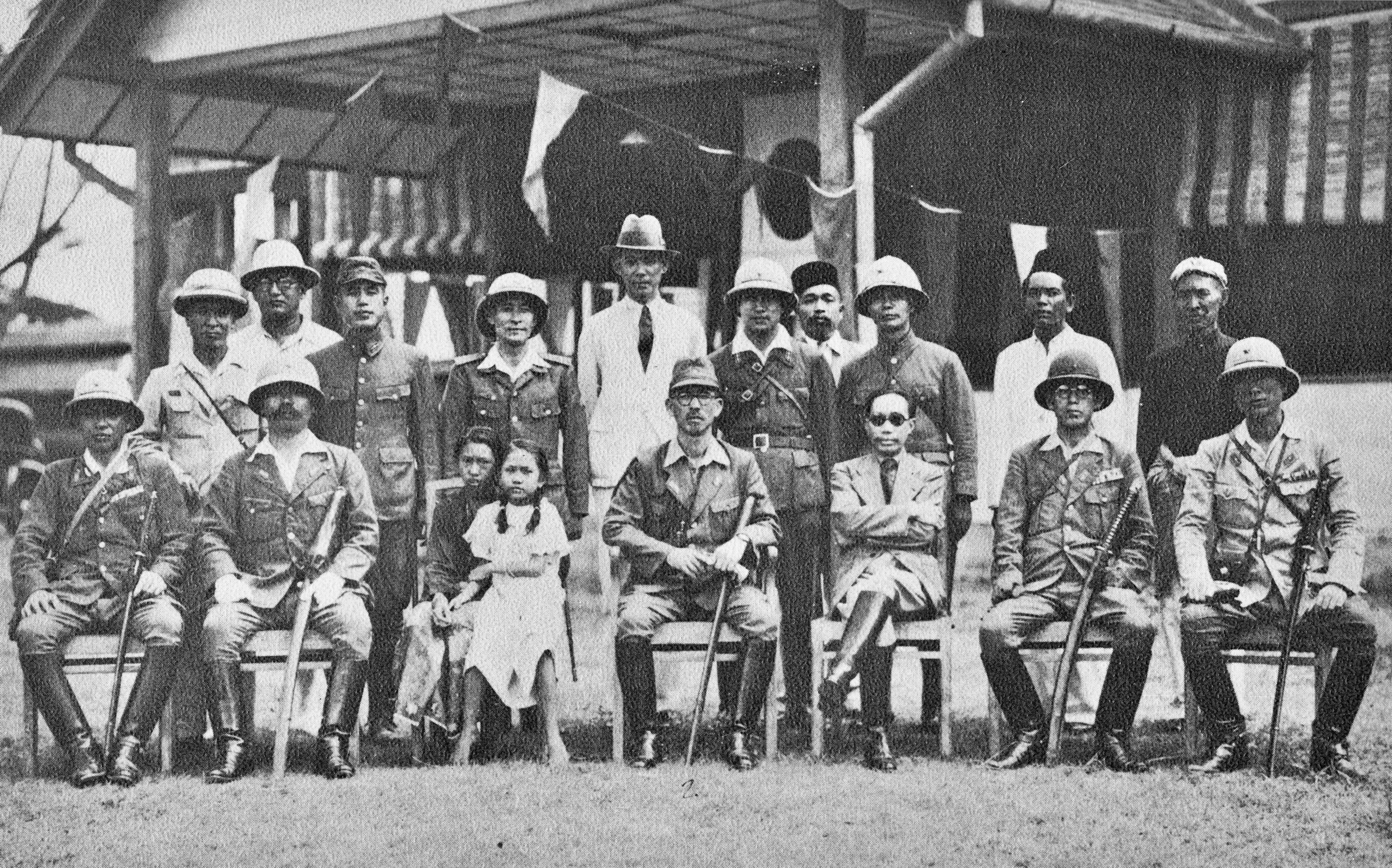
Ahmad Tajuddin and Maeda Yoshinori's forces in 1942–1945

During an early 1942 visit to Brunei, Maeda Yoshinori was pictured with his top officers, the Sultan, and Pengiran Anak Besar Bagol. The Japanese continued to recognise the Sultan as the head of the Islamic religion and the Royal Customs so long as he co-operated with them. He was advised by the Japanese to retire and offered a monthly pension together with medals of honour from the Emperor of Japan. Detachment on 22 December 1941, was mostly symbolic, much like the British approach of keeping local rulers in place but giving them little actual authority.

The Borneo Planning Unit of the Colonial Office drew up plans in June 1944 to force Brunei and Sarawak to sign new treaties that would have reduced Brunei to the status of a protectorate under British law, severely undermining the Sultan's authority. Due to military control over the Borneo regions by the United States and then Australia, this plan was put on hold for a while. Negotiated with the Sultan following the battle, the pact sought to give the British complete sovereignty over Brunei. Pre-war Resident Pengilley, however, expected little opposition from the Sultan over the suggested modifications, characterising him as morally deficient and physically inconsequential.

By mid-1945, the Japanese were facing defeat and their forces in Brunei were becoming more violent in their actions toward the populace. Locals were threatened by food shortages during the occupation. A plan was made to save the Sultan and the royal family from the increasing Japanese war crimes. The Sultan and his closest relatives, together with loyal palace officials, were hidden by Haji Kassim bin Tamin, the village headman of Kampong Tentaya, Limbang, in the early months of 1945 due to the intensified Allied bombing of oil installations at Miri and Lutong, as well as the machine-gunning of the Istana Mahkota itself. During the Sultan's absence, a large portion of the palace's contents, including pieces of the royal regalia, were looted.

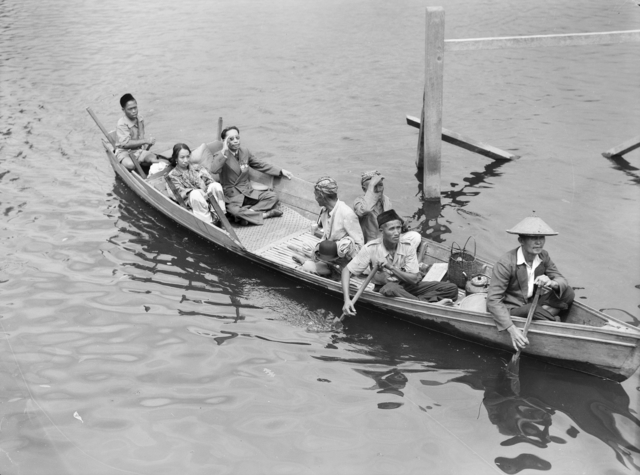
Tengku Raihani and Ahmad Tajuddin returning to Brunei from Tantaya on a perahu on 17 June 1945

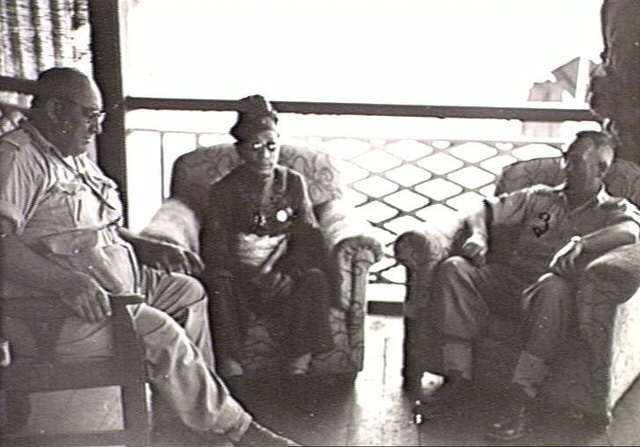
Lieutenant General Leslie Morshead, Ahmad Tajuddin and Major General George Wootten at Bubungan Dua Belas on 29 June 1945

Istana Tantaya had been built in Kampong Tantaya and the Sultan lived there for about three months until Brunei was liberated by the Australian Army. Ahmad Tajuddin was met with great warmth by the Australian 9th Division upon his return to Brunei Town on 17 June 1945. As soon as the Australian military commander arranged for him to be received with a Guard of Honour and brought to the British Army Headquarters at Bubungan Dua Belas for tea, he made speedy use of medical help for his asthma and was put back in the Istana Mahkota "in protective custody." Despite suspicions of working with the Japanese, investigations proved he had committed no serious crimes, and the British government's pre-war resident Pengilley attested to his allegiance to them prior to the Japanese takeover. Even so, until civilian government was reinstated in July 1946, the Sultan's political power was constrained under the Australian-run British Borneo Civil Affairs Unit and the ensuing British Military Administration.

Following the liberation of Brunei Town by the Australian forces, his personal standard was raised. Until 6 July 1946, when civil government was reinstated, Brunei remained under the control of the Allied Forces. Pengiran Ahmad bin Pengiran Pemancha Pengiran Anak Haji Muhammad Yasin, presently known as Pengiran Maharaja Anakda, succeeded his brother Pengiran Anak Besar Bagol, who had died during the occupation, in the role of Sanggamara.

After Allied bombs severely damaged the Istana Mahkota in early 1945, Ahmad Tajuddin, his spouse, and his family relocated to a small home in Brunei Town. After his demands for a new palace and reimbursement for war damages were turned down, he moved to Kuching in the middle of 1949. There, the Brunei flag was flown from his home, Istana Kechil, and royal pennants adorned his vehicle. The British rationale for defying his demands was centered on higher priorities for post-war reconstruction, namely government buildings and hospitals. Tensions over administrative unification and the nomination of Sarawak officials to posts in the Brunei government heightened when the Governor of Sarawak was named ex officio High Commissioner for Brunei in 1947, further subordinating the Sultanate to Sarawak's authority.

=== MacDonald's 1946 visit ===
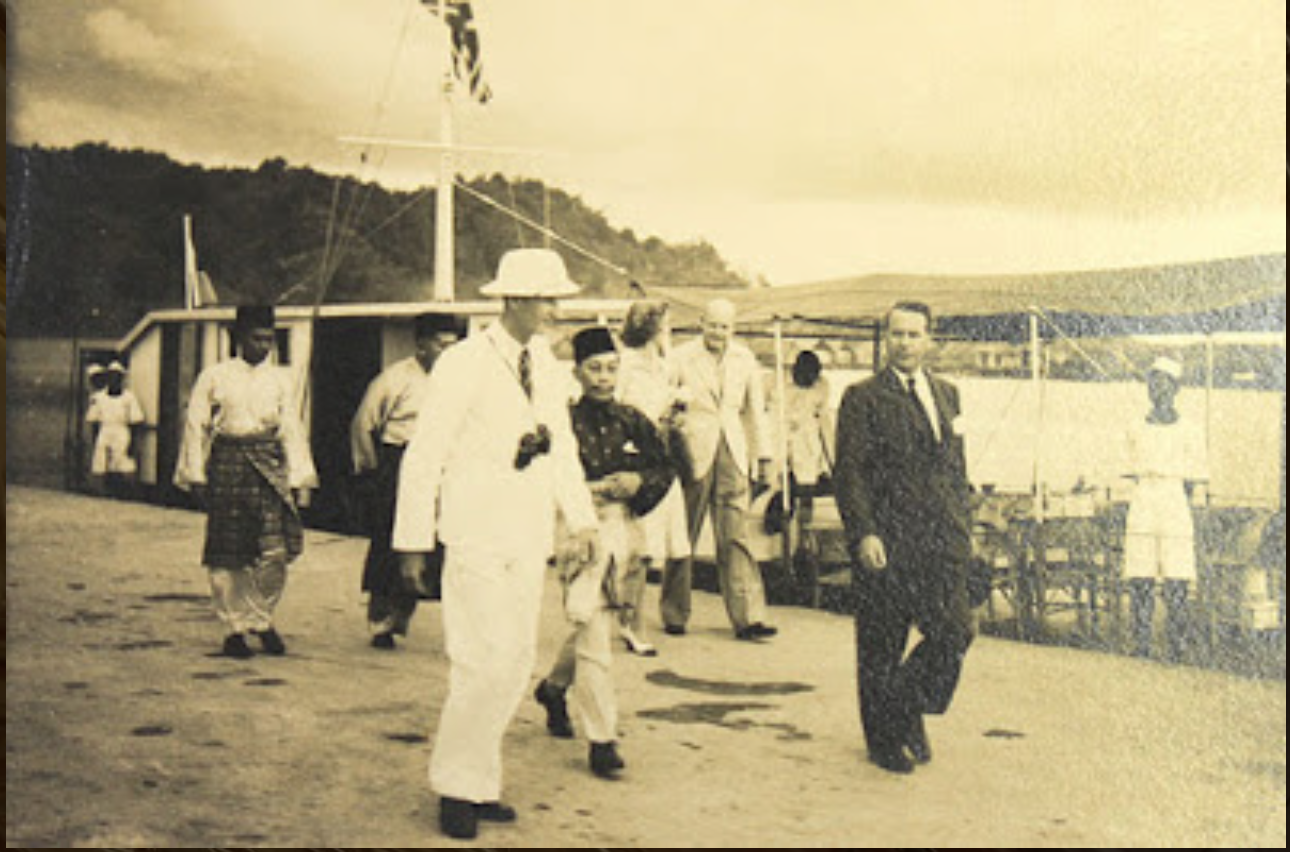
Ahmad Tajuddin welcoming MacDonald upon his arrival in Brunei

On his first trip to Brunei in July 1946, MacDonald met Ahmad Tajuddin, whom he characterised as a weak, fragile man who liked ladies, drink, and the odd song. Tajuddin, who had ruled for 22 years at the age of 33, was viewed as the result of a shabby upbringing and excessive luxury, in part because his mother had supported his promiscuous lifestyle. Even as Sultan, he was seen as a degenerate since he had disregarded his education and his duties as a ruler in favour of inheriting a sizeable harem and indulging in its pleasures. A welcoming arch was built in Brunei Town upon MacDonald's visit there in late 1946. It included the words "Restorer of Peace and Justice" under the Union Jack and the phrase "Sole Right of the Sultan and His Subjects" beneath the Brunei flag. The arch was meant to send a message to the British government that they had to respect the Sultan's and his subjects' rights if they were to establish peace and security to Brunei. The previous slogan was to be removed, per British orders, but the Sultan stepped in to support the local teenagers and said he liked their "national spirit" for keeping both slogans.

When Ahmad Tajuddin first appeared in the Brunei River, his half-grown size, peculiar attire, and exaggerated facial characteristics gave him a rather humorous aspect. His outfit, which looked like it belonged in a musical comedy, consisted of a dark blue tunic with silver trimmings, black riding breeches, black top-boots, and a black peaked hat. It was also adorned with insignia and medals. Three girls made up his entourage; the youngest, from his official wife, had particularly untamed and ill-tempered eyes.

At 142 centimetres (56 in), he had the build of a tiny kid but the face of an adult, with a noticeable degeneracy and frailty. His jet-black hair, slicked back and split to show a shaved patch on his crown, contrasted sharply with his pale complexion. His huge full-lipped mouth contrasted with his delicate yet sensual nose and protruding eyes, which were enhanced by horn-rimmed glasses. His minimal facial hair, including a faint moustache and a few stray chin hairs, contributed to his overall picture of an impotent and somewhat pathetic figure. His garb was colourful yet out of place, a reflection of his quirkiness in creating oddball outfits. This time, he was decked up in a dark blue tunic with silver accents, obscene riding breeches-style pants, and a bus-driver-style black cap. He wore black patent leather top-boots, a silver belt, and several decorations, including a pair of beribboned medals on his chest and the jewel of the CMG hung around his neck. Some observers described his appearance as theatrical, noting that it was more reminiscent of a musical play than traditional royal regalia.

As the 1 July 1946 deadline for restoring civilian government in Brunei approached, Secretary of State for the Colonies Arthur Creech Jones accepted MacDonald's recommendation to maintain Brunei's independence from the administrations of North Borneo and Sarawak. The decision upheld pre-war arrangements, pending the proposal of new constitutional changes. Ahmad Tajuddin started to make more of an effort to establish himself during this time. He most famously protested against Rajah Charles Vyner Brooke's intention to hand over Sarawak to the British Crown in February 1947, saying that Brunei should have been the recipient of any such cession. Resident William John Peel did not appear to endorse his remarks, and there was no sign that the Colonial Office was changing its position on the Sultan or that he was being invited to take part in talks in London.

It was during his reign that saw Brunei have its own national anthem "Allah Peliharakan Sultan", which is similar to "God Save the King" in England. In 1947, the national anthem was composed by Haji Besar bin Sagap and lyrics written by Pengiran Setia Negara Pengiran Haji Mohammad Yusuf bin Pengiran Haji Abdul Rahim That same year, he gave his approval to fly the red and white flag of the Youth Front, natively known as the Barisan Pemuda (BARIP), on 12 April, the day of the political party's first yearly anniversary of foundation. It conveyed to the British government that the Sultan was secretly endorsing the BARIP, an organisation that was allegedly disseminating revolutionary ideas in the vein of Indonesia. Later on 15 July, he bestowed the title Pengiran Bendahara Seri Maharaja Permaisuara on his brother, Pengiran Muda Omar Ali Saifuddien.

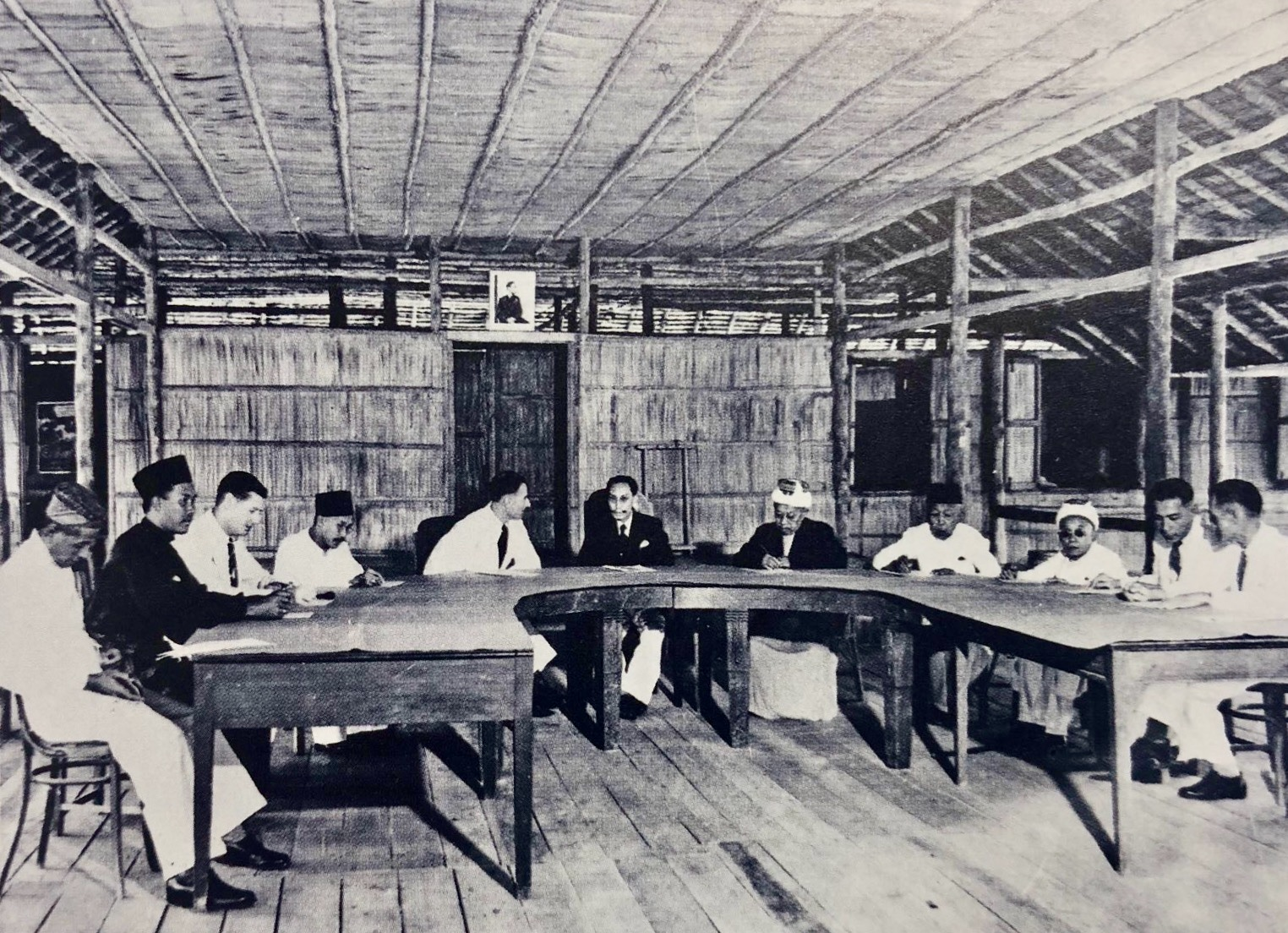
Ahmad Tajuddin chairing the 1948 State Council meeting at Lapau

Due to the ever-rising tension between the Sultan and Peel, Charles Arden-Clarke's secretary Pretty was sent to defuse the situation. In August 1948, Pretty was reappointed as a resident in an attempt to repair the relationship with the Malay states including Brunei. He recommended that the Sultan write a letter to the Secretary of State in hopes of the British government paying more attention to hardship and difficulties faced by Brunei. Pretty also made an effort to build the Sultan a new palace after the previous was destroyed in the war.

=== Silver Jubilee ===
The sickness of Ahmad Tajuddin cast a cloud over his scheduled 20 September 1949, Silver Jubilee. He was to be flown back to Brunei for the festivities on the eve of the event from Kuching, where he was residing. But when they arrived at Kuching, he was not there, and it was disclosed in an apologetic letter that he and the Tengku Raihani were not in the best of moods and were not eager to go. Although he had been leading a laid-back lifestyle in Kuching, he had lately taken to his bed, spending 10 days alone himself, refusing to work or receive guests, and avoiding communication with the outside world.

When he willingly admitted himself into the hospital, his condition worsened and he became extremely agitated. Even though there were no such noises at the hospital, he complained about constant bell ringing there and about interruptions in the quiet at home. These hallucinations were the initial symptoms of delirium tremens, a disorder brought on by a large alcohol intake. The doctor looked inside the Sultan's room and found 423 empty beer bottles. This indicated that he had been consuming an alarming average of 42 bottles each day for the previous ten days, which would account for his serious condition.

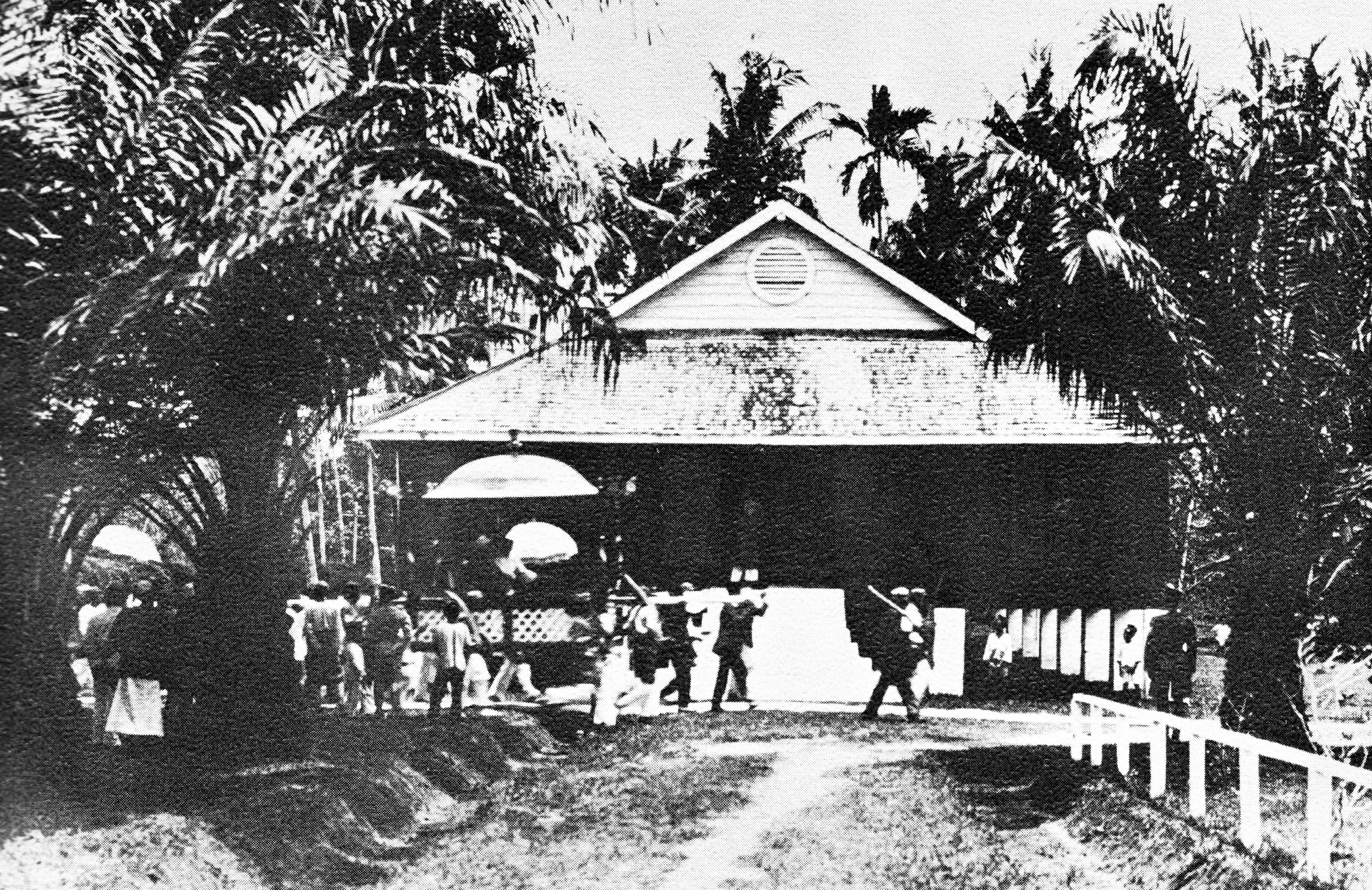
Ahmad Tajuddin being borne during his silver jubilee celebration

Ahmad Tajuddin's health had declined in the weeks before his Silver Jubilee, his kidneys failing after years of stress. The doctor informed him that he only had six to eighteen months to live, despite the fact that medical personnel were able to have him looking presentable for the occasion. He became disinterested in worldly affairs after learning of this prediction since he believed that they were pointless given his imminent death, including the Jubilee events. Rather, he decided to enjoy life's little pleasures, drinking and partying, and ignoring the formalities of his rule. Despite this, he was pushed by his wife, who shunned public appearances, to attend his Silver Jubilee in Brunei despite his initial refusal, which he justified with a medical claim. Following a protracted struggle, he grudgingly consented to go, seeming weak and exhausted from illness when he arrived at the airstrip in Kuching. His physique was slender and his face was haggard, giving the sense that death was imminent. His look had significantly deteriorated.

The Sultan was only very reluctantly convinced to attend his own silver jubilee celebration in Brunei on 22 September 1949, by his Kuching friend Datu Bandar Abang Hj. Mustapha and Sarawak's Chief Secretary R. Gordon Aikman. The fact that he had to use some of his allowance to cover the cost of the festivities also made him upset. However, upon his return to Brunei, he decided, or was persuaded, to remain in the nation, with the commencement of work on his new Istana no likely having a major influence.

After a night of rain, he boarded a plane, which quickly took off, and arrived at a furnished pavilion the next morning, when he was greeted by dignitaries who bent down respectfully. Distinguished guests wore colourful garments that stood in stark contrast to the colonial delegates' more somber outfits. He wore an emerald green silk and gold ensemble to the occasion. His crown was too tiny and had to be worn at a rakish slant, which partly overshadowed the grandeur of his look. The bright and intricate clothing of the other attendants, such as his wife, other senior officials, and prominent visitors, contrasted with the Sultan's gown, contributing to the ceremony's visual magnificence.

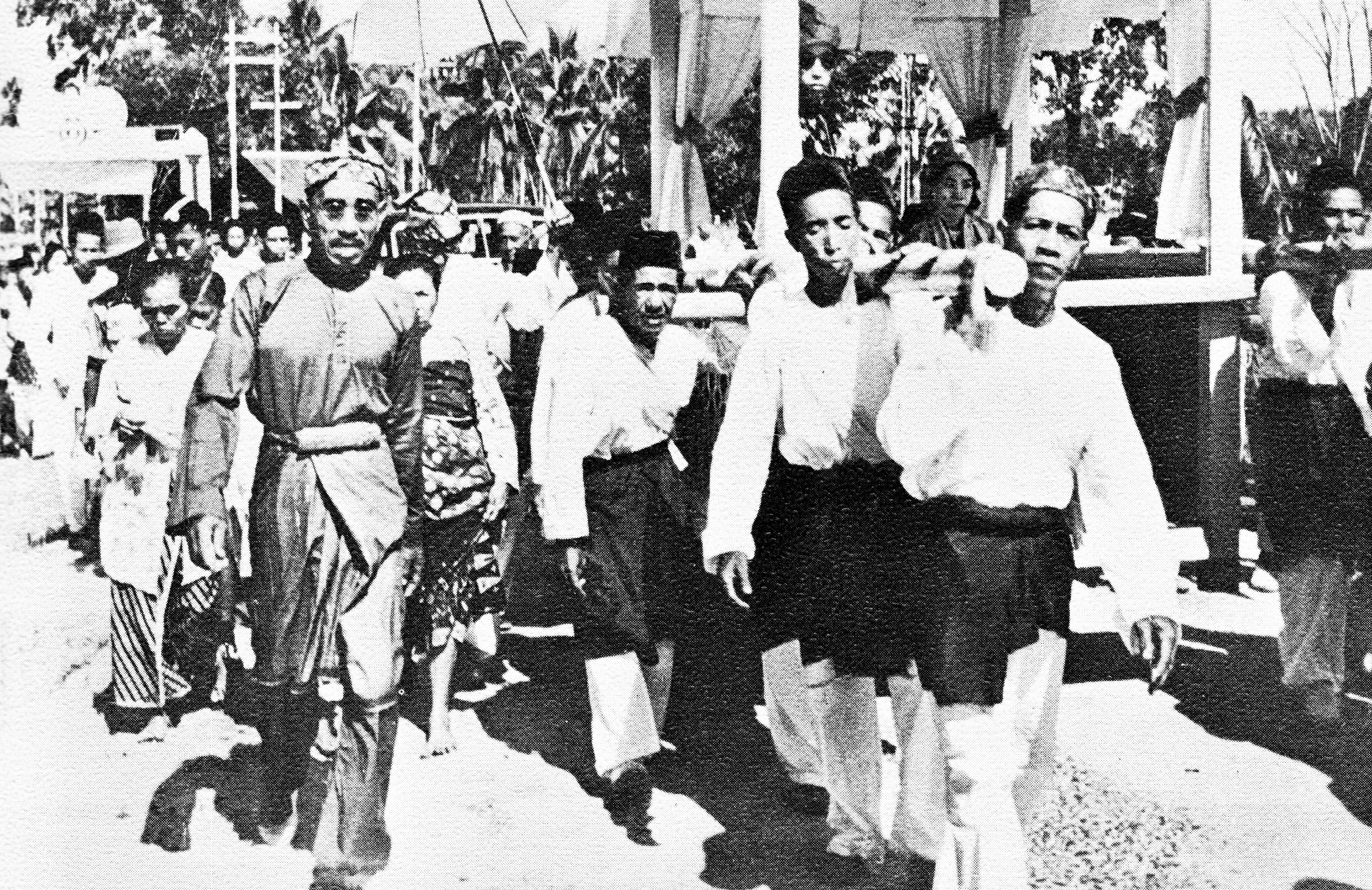
Ahmad Tajuddin and Tengku Raihani being paraded during the silver jubilee celebration in 1949

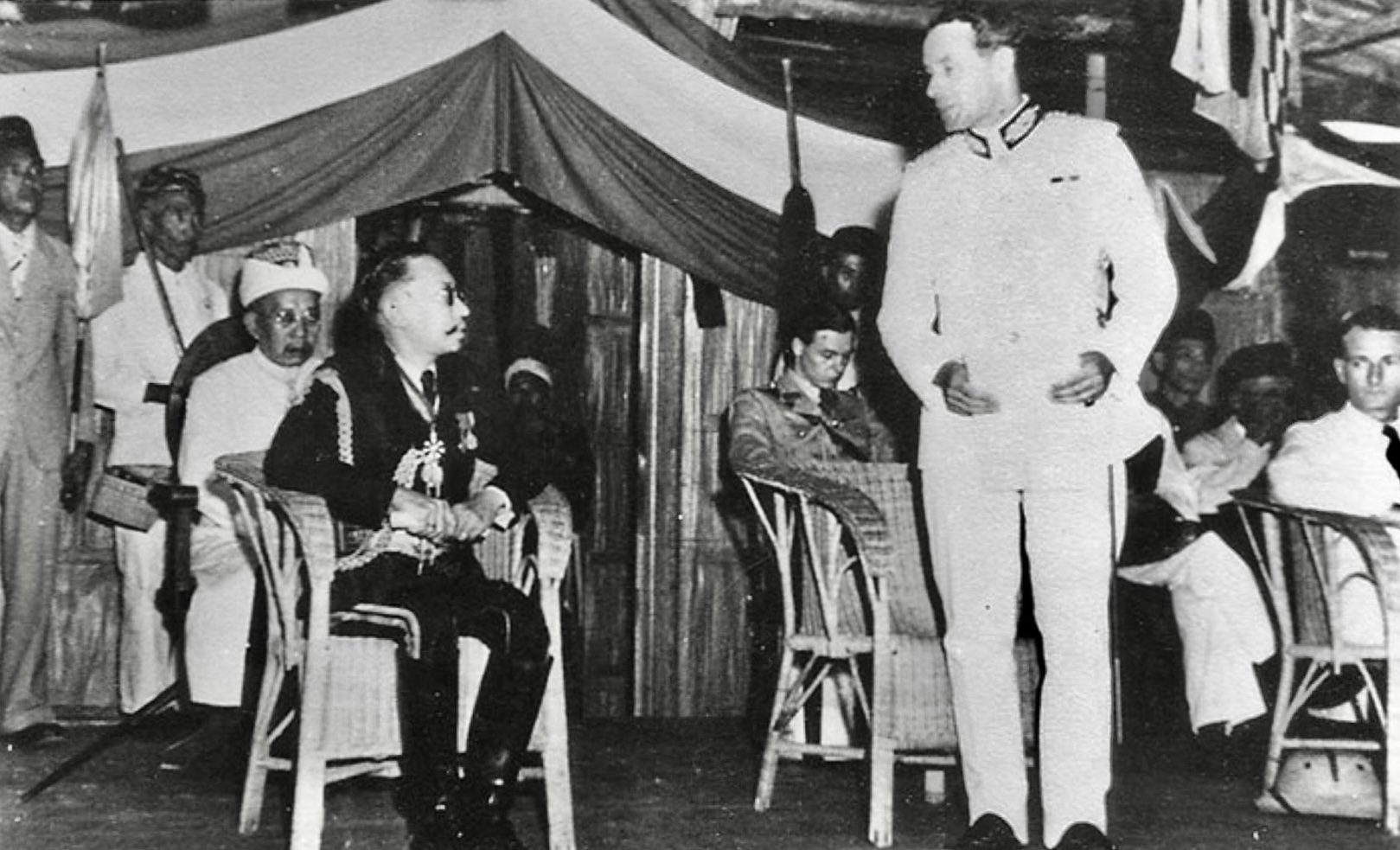
MacDonald presenting his congratulations during Ahmad Tajuddin's Silver Jubilee in 1949

Ahmad Tajuddin, along with his four children and his mother, who was known to be a dark figure, attended a tea party in the Residency garden. Her mysterious smile and sharp eyes suggested a more menacing side, even with her delicate appearance and kind manner. The comparison between her apparent gentility and the darker stories around her fascinated the observer, who was cautious because of her suspected history. But everything went down without a hitch, and the onlooker wondered if the stories were just the mouthpieces of displeased courtiers. Speaking via an interpreter, he was animated at a tea party, thanking the British for their protection following the Japanese occupation. He was talkative and sometimes funny, but he didn't seem all that into the tea; he didn't finish his cup and seemed preoccupied. His demeanour conveyed a lack of interest or unease, maybe associated with his medical condition, as his mother and other female attendees watched the exchange with differing degrees of impartiality and interest.

After earlier suffering with his lack of interest in the tea, Ahmad Tajuddin seemed cheerful at an evening occasion, dressed in formal attire and wearing medals. Even though his expression was lighthearted and joyful, there was a hint of glassiness in his eyes, as though he was trying to make up for his earlier pain. Despite his regal attire, his exuberant and young manner created a striking contrast with the weight of his obligations, making one feel sorry for him because it seemed like he hadn't prepared himself enough for the demands of his position. When he and two of his daughters attended the Jubilee, Brunei's social norms changed dramatically because, before, it was unheard of for women to attend such occasions. However, not everyone embraced this shift; some, like the wife of Penghiran Bendahara, declined to go because of ingrained cultural customs. A gradual but imperfect relaxing of conventional gender roles in Brunei was symbolised by the Ahmad Tajuddin's old nurse and two other older ladies, who attended the event in defiance of established standards.

He and his spouse assumed their positions on recently constructed thrones for the formal celebration, which was accompanied by a boisterous royal orchestra and newly painted stage-like décor. The orchestra performed loudly and for a long time, as was customary, and eventually Ahmad Tajuddin, who detested both the music and the players, agreed to let them play. His obvious unease and dislike brought to light his own contempt for the ritualistic practices, which contrasted with the anticipated respect for the event. The Silver Jubilee conducted amidst typical pomp and ceremony, was tarnished by the Sultan's severe unhappiness with the continual cacophony of the royal orchestra, which he found aggravating. He eventually issued an order to remove them from the schedule despite their significance to the ceremony, expressing his dissatisfaction with the requirements of the celebration.

King George VI gave him the Knight Commander of the Most Excellent Order of the British Empire (KBE) at the event. MacDonald and officials from neighbouring nations attended the event, which consisted of a three-day celebration in Brunei Town and a parallel celebration in Kuala Belait. The event was celebrated with a Thanksgiving Ceremony at Brunei Town Mosque and the issuance of commemorative stamps and Jubilee Medals.

=== Later reign ===
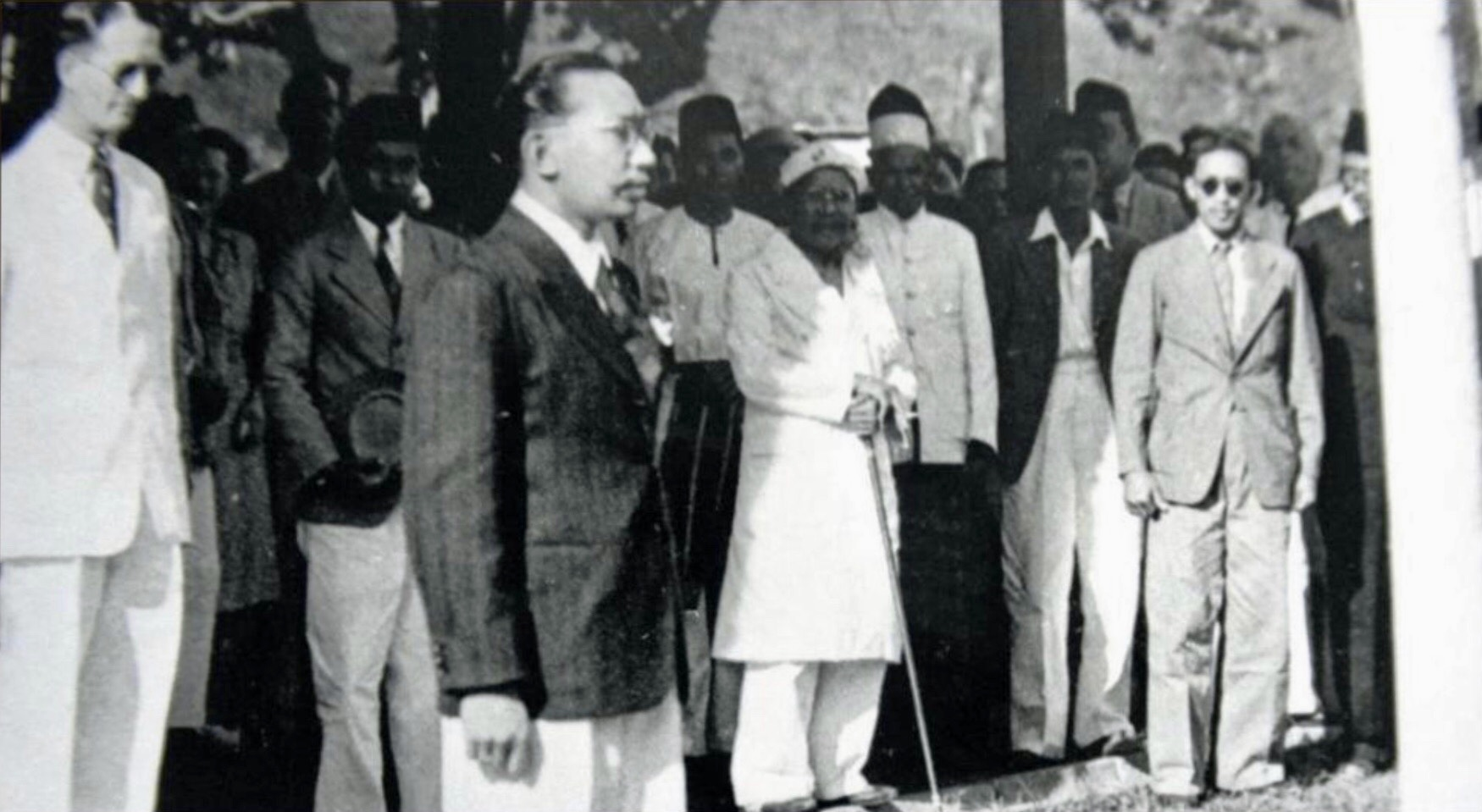
Ahmad Tajuddin alongside Omar Ali Saifuddien III in 1950

While residing in Kuching in May 1950, Ahmad Tajuddin put his faith in MacBryan, who utilised his contact with the Sultan's private secretary, Inche Hassan bin Kulap Mohamed, to rise to the position of Political Advisor to the Sultan. In London, MacBryan represented Brunei's financial and constitutional rights after the country signed the 1905–1906 Supplementary Treaty with Britain. MacBryan drew inspiration for his own political strategies from Ahmad Tajuddin's 1937 reform in Brunei.

The Sultan was not happy with the British government's unwillingness to return his palace, even if he did receive a salary raise and more oil royalties. MacBryan took advantage of the Sultan's unhappiness and convinced him to get involved in politics. One of his plans was to travel to London in order to renegotiate Brunei's constitutional arrangement and push for more royalties from British Malayan Petroleum. The Sultan was frustrated with the Treaties that limited his operations and conveyed his pain over the oilfield concessions in a letter to MacBryan dated 1 June 1950. He also stated his desire for financial resources to help his people.

By 1 June 1950, MacBryan and the Sultan were getting ready to leave Singapore for London in order to talk about Brunei's constitutional relationship with the United Kingdom. The Sultan formally selected MacBryan as his Political Secretary and designated Princess Nor Ehsani as his heir, to be known as Puteri Besar, when they were staying at the Raffles Hotel. While his younger brother Pengiran Muda Omar Ali Saifuddien possessed the title of Pengiran Bendahara, not as heir apparent, the Sultan also questioned the validity of Brooke's cession of Sarawak without his input and wanted $5,000 in tribute. He also expressed his displeasure with Brunei's oilfield exploitation and gave MacBryan permission to bring up these concerns with the Secretary of State for the Colonies.

The four letters dated 1 June 1950, which were purportedly bearing the Sultan's seal and were written in an elegant English, are nowhere to be found, casting doubt on MacBryan's authority over Ahmad Tajuddin. Although it is impossible to rule out fabrication, the substance of the letters fits the Sultan's known problems and worries, indicating that they could be a true reflection of his emotions. MacBryan skillfully handled the Sultan's concerns and sought to establish himself as an important adviser by utilising his courtly Malay abilities and familiarity with the British system. In addition to overseeing the Sultan's finances, his goals included incorporating Muslims from southern Philippines and northern Borneo into Brunei's post-war government. This latter goal probably alarmed the Colonial Office since it would affect Brunei's oil output and sovereignty.

== Death and funeral ==
Raffles Hotel as seen in 1920–1939

When Sultan Ahmad Tajuddin made a stopover in Singapore en route to the United Kingdom to revise the 1906 Agreement on raising oil royalties, he fell ill and was admitted to the Singapore General Hospital on 3 June 1950. He arrived at the hospital and later died on the following day, from renal failure after suffering a haemorrhage he suffered at the Raffles Hotel on the night of 3 June, aged 36. Upon completion of his funeral, his body was laid in state at the foyer of the Grand Palace of Johore Bahru, to provide opportunities for national dignitaries, senior government officials and local community leaders from different ethnic and religious, to pay their respects to the late monarch and send their condolences to his wife. MacDonald brought a wreath and attended the funeral on 4 June 1950.

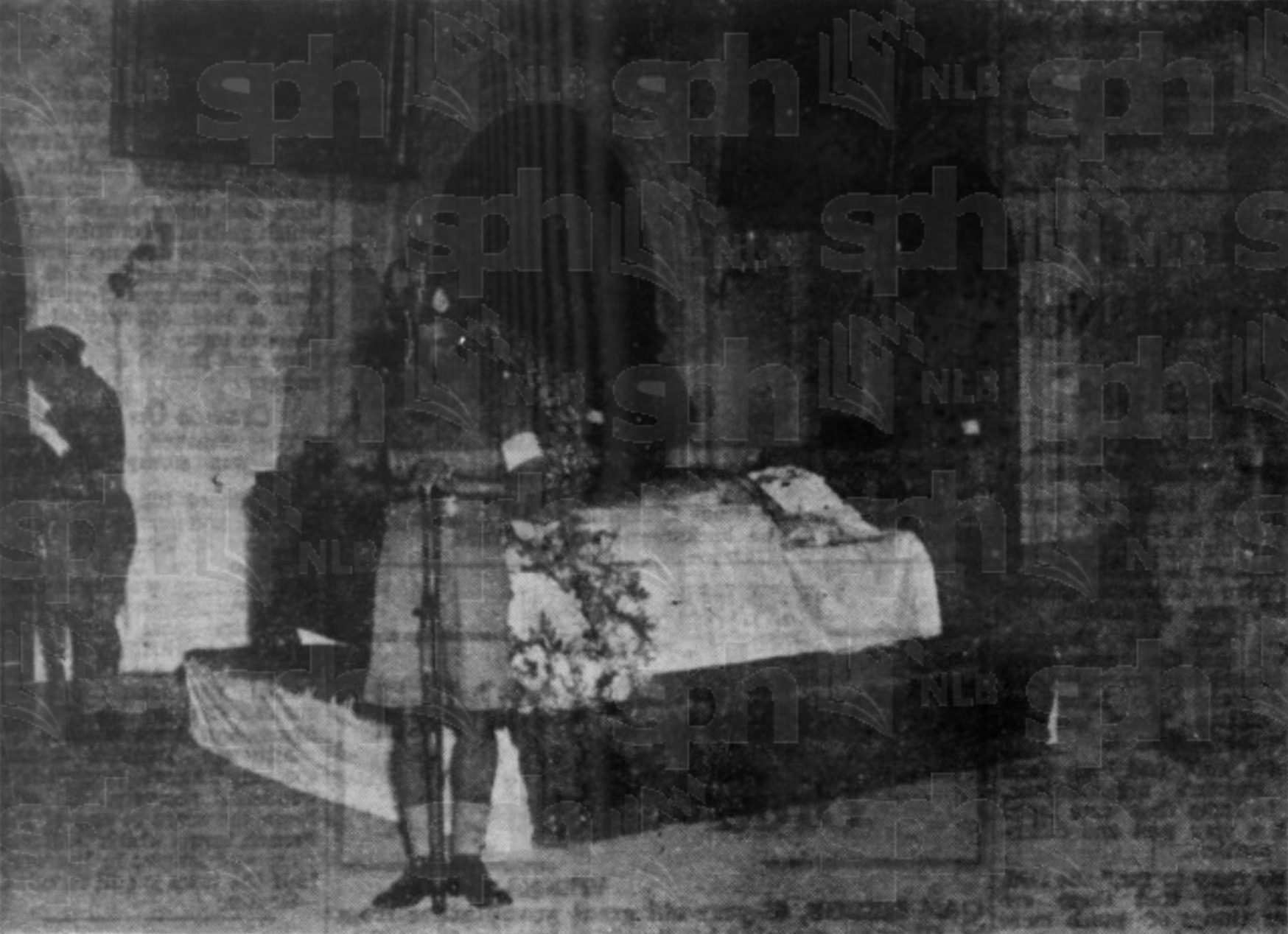
Four Malayan soldiers standing guard over the body of Ahmad Tajuddin in 1950

The late-Sultan's wife, whose brother was Sultan Hisamuddin at the time, made a fruitless attempt to convince the Singaporean authorities that he should be buried in Klang Royal Mausoleum while his body was lying in state at the Sultan of Johore's Istana Besar in neighbouring Johore Bahru. It was imperative to remind her that according to Bruneian custom, his successor could not be named until his subjects had seen his face before to his burial. Meanwhile, MacDonald was writing Tengku Raihani a vague condolence message:

I was very fond of His Highness the Sultan. He was one of the most colourful personages whom I have ever met and we had many interesting times together. I shall always remember his lively personality on future visits to Borneo.

— Malcolm MacDonald, Commissioner-General for the UK in South East Asia to British Resident, 5 June 1950, MacDonald Papers 19/11/13–15

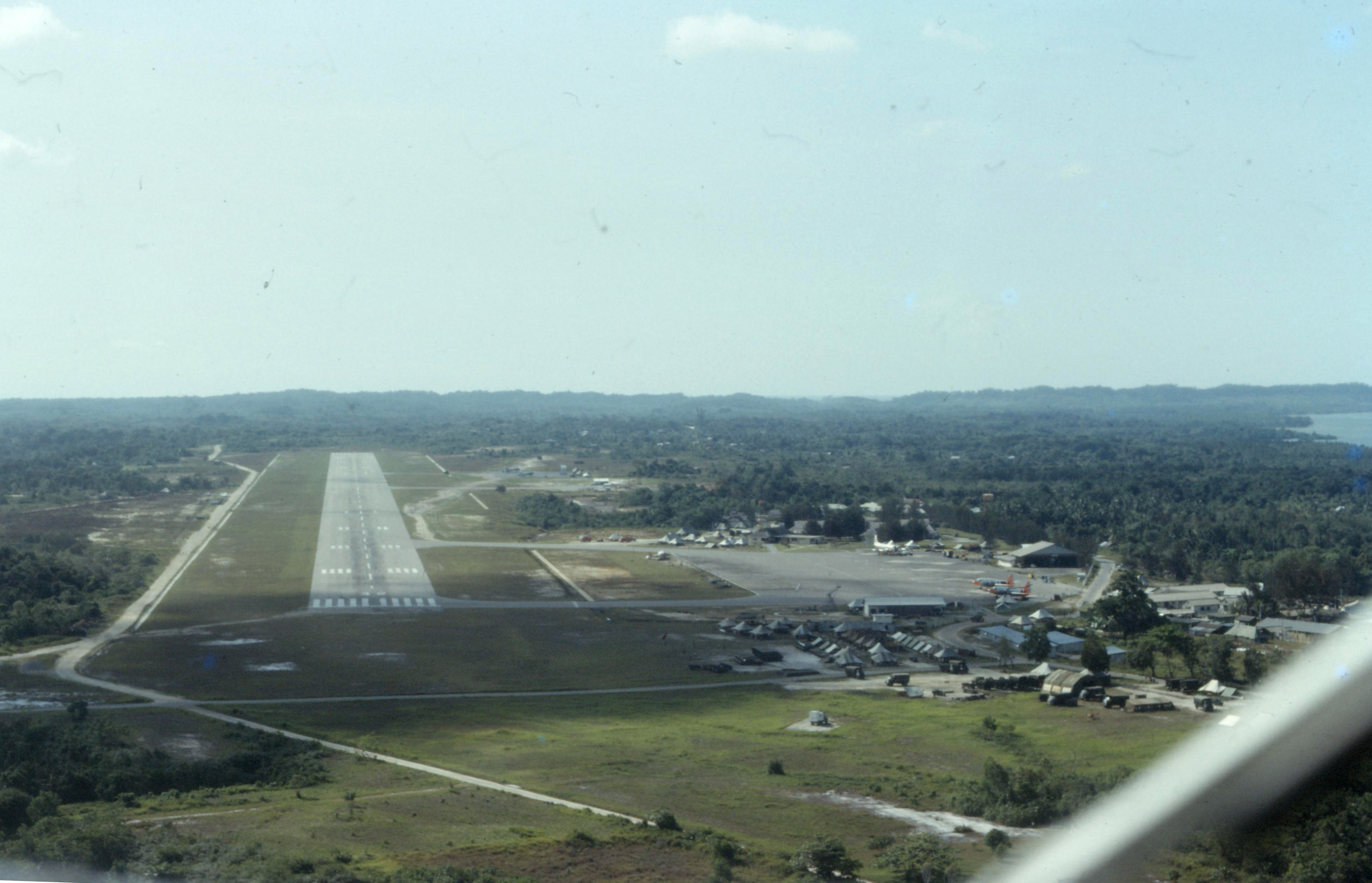
Labuan Airport in January 1963

After the Sultan's body was flown back to Labuan Airport on a Royal Air Force (RAF) Douglas C-47 Dakota aircraft and transported with full ceremony by royal barge to the Lapau in Brunei Town. Before the plane took off to Labuan, many dignitaries and ambassadors were present at the airport to pay their respects to the late Sultan.

A. M. Grier, the official representative of the North Borneo administration, gave a thorough account of the following events. After arriving back in Jesselton on June 5, he discovered telegrams informing him that launches from Brunei carrying senior commanders and mourners were scheduled to arrive at midday in order to receive His Highness's remains and retinue. I made the decision to attend the launching and send a signal from Brunei on the funeral arrangements because of the difficulties in communicating with Brunei and the date of the aircraft's arrival. With Muslims adorning white bands around their songkoks and Europeans sporting black bands on their sleeves, the mourning launches arrived with much fanfare. Even though it was a somber event, there was a widespread sense of joy as mourners and many Labuan residents traveled to the airstrip in lorries and other forms of transportation to await the plane.

The airport had made the right arrangements since the plane was on time and positioned next to the Guard of Honour. The State flag covered the coffin, which was mounted on an RAF vehicle with dignitaries sat next to it and exquisite wreaths from other dignitaries adorning the surroundings. Since leaving Labuan, the family gathering has grown to include the senior and younger brothers of Tengku Raihani. The family then temporarily retreated to the Rest House after the casket was moved to the M.L. Muara in front of a sizeable gathering at the dock. Inche Hassan, the Sultan's secretary, made harsh remarks about some members of the Selangor Royal House and gave detailed information on the Sultan's last sickness while also voicing worries about his own future in Brunei.

After the preparations in Labuan, the procession slowed down as it crossed the Brunei River in order to reach its destination by 5 p.m. The spectacle at the dock was visually arresting, with a decked barge, lots of perahu, and a sizeable crowd, all led by a Brunei Police Guard of Honour. Only Pretty and his wife went with the family as the body of the late Sultan was ceremoniously taken ashore and transferred to the palace. Others chose to skip the official mourning rituals and instead watched as the Selangor royal family appraised the late Sultan's priceless presents. During this time, two divisive topics emerged. Although Brunei's records proved only male heirs could inherit the kingdom, it was thought that MacBryan prepared for a notice in the Straits Times announcing the Sultan's intention for his legitimate daughter, Princess Nor Ehsani, to replace him. The Sultan had hired MacBryan as his private secretary in Singapore. Furthermore, the Wazirs picked the burial place despite the Tengku Raihani's request to bury the Sultan on his estate close to Brunei Town. In the end, they concluded that the Pengiran Bendahara would prevail.

Tuesday, 6 June 1950, was the appointed time for the Sultan's burial services. However, the casket and mourners arrived around 45 minutes later than expected. Additionally, Tengku Raihani, her brother, and daughter arrived at the dock without permission, so they missed the event. The casket was brought along a white cloth-covered road during the magnificent ceremony held at the Lapau. Following prayers, the Pengiran Bendahara was proclaimed the new Sultan, winning the support of the populace and greetings from surrounding countries. The burial site, Royal Mausoleum, which was situated on a hillside resembling a Chinese graveyard, was reached by a water procession carrying the coffin and a sizeable number of launches after the ceremony. However, the steep terrain made it difficult for mourners to get to the site, adding to the solemnity and heat of the hot day.

The casket was opened upon arrival to let the Sultan's body touch the ground, despite the fact that it had been embalmed in Singapore. The procedure continued, and ultimately the coffin was lowered and the grave was filled even though the grave proved to be too tiny for it. Then the mourners filed back to the launchers in a haphazard fashion, like spectators fighting for position during a football game. By 9:30 p.m., the observer had returned to Labuan and was expressing gratitude for Resident Pretty and his wife's handling of the issue and their great esteem for them. She was also commenting on the unusual combination of traditional ceremony and noisy crowd.

Shortly after, MacDonald was forced to get involved personally in the succession dispute in Brunei. Omar Ali Saifuddin III, the new Sultan, was proclaimed on 5 June 1950, with MacDonald's full approval, as the late Sultan left no male heir. This decision was confirmed by a special State Council meeting attended by prominent Bruneian figures, including Pretty and Anthony Abell. Pengiran Muda Omar Ali Saifuddin became an apparent heir when he was appointed to the position of first Wazir since he became the most senior member of Brunei's political system.

== Marriage and issue ==
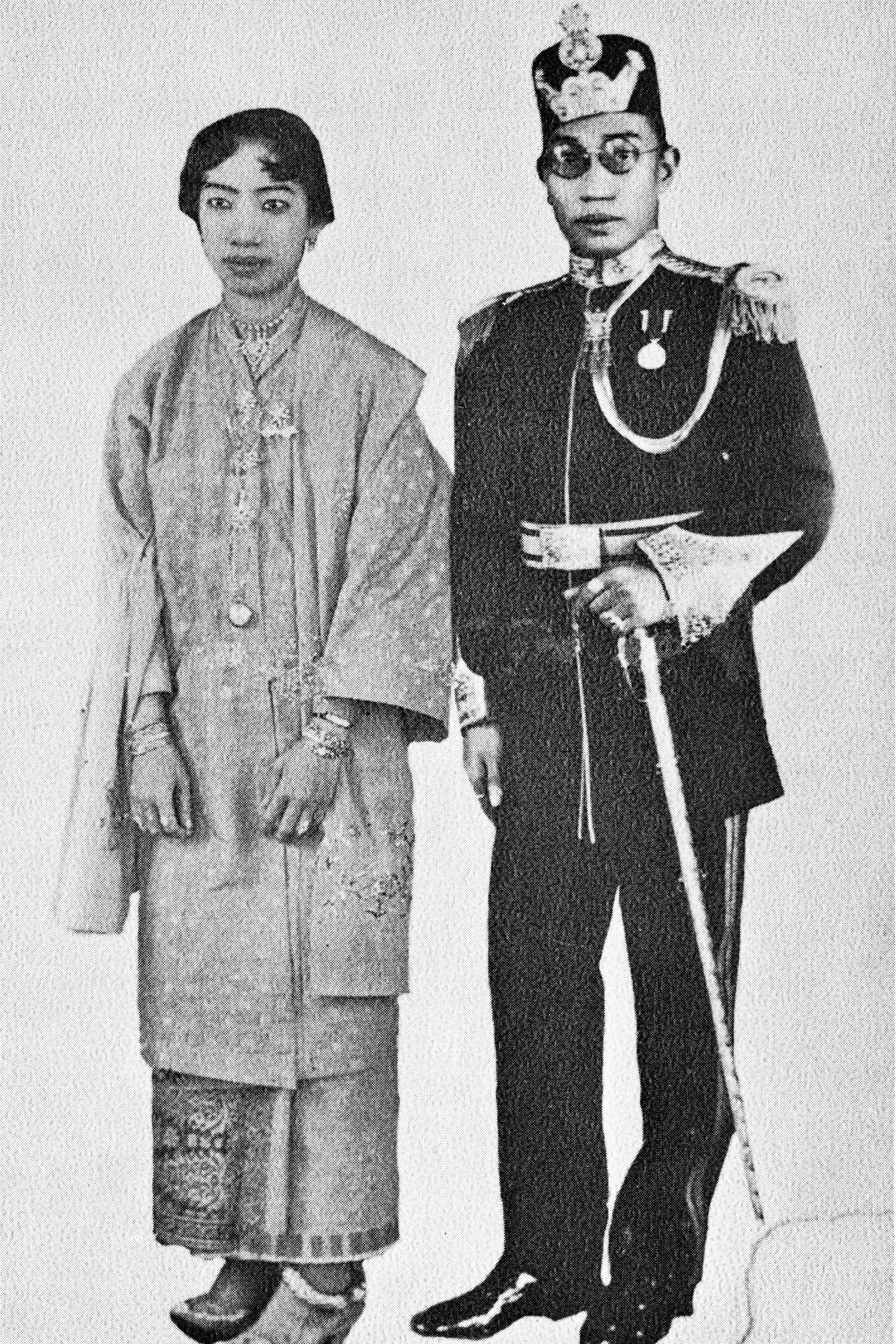
Tengku Raihani and Sultan Ahmad Tajuddin

With authorities and members of his family present, Ahmad Tajuddin wed Tengku Raihani on 30 April 1934; their daughter, Princess Nor Ehsani, was born in Klang in 1935. As the eldest daughter of the couple, she was fully fledged and entitled to royal status, giving her precedence over her older half-sisters.

Ahmad Tajuddin had three daughters from his first marriage to Kadayang Amas (Maskaton) binti Ampuan Salleh, but no boys. His travels to Selangor, such as those made in 1937 for the Golden Jubilee of the Sultan of Selangor, served to further cement the alliance between the two royal houses. He had three eldest daughters, each carried the title of Belabub: (Note: The word "Balabab," sometimes spelled "Belabab," translates to "beloved" in English.) Belabub Besar (Big Belabub), Belabub Tengah (Middle Belabub), and Belabub Damit (Small Belabub). The three daughters are;

- Pengiran Anak Datin Seri Setia Siti Saerah, born in 1929, died on 4 November 2013.
- Pengiran Anak Datin Seri Setia Siti Zubaidah
- Pengiran Anak Datin Seri Setia Siti Halimah, born in 1935, died on 4 January 2009.

Tengku Kelana Jaya Petra, the brother-in-law of the Sultan and a former Raja Muda of Selangor, put a lot of pressure on the Sultan at the time to have the heir born in Malaya, against Bruneian custom, put the mother at risk. She tried not to give in to the pressure, but the Selangor family's might won out, and Princess Nor Ehsani was born at Klang towards the end of August 1935. He would also enrolled his kids at Brunei's Catholic school.

== Legacy ==
=== Appearance and health ===
Ahmad Tajuddin was known for his passion for sports throughout his life; he was not only a football player but also enjoyed horse riding. Beyond his athletic interests, he was regarded as an artist with a deep appreciation for literature, leaving behind the book Guidance for Security, printed by Mohd. Darwi of Mohamediah Press. Physically, Ahmad Tajuddin wore spectacles, was short in stature, and had unusually long hair. Australian physician M. C. Clarke described him as a colourfully dressed man in his early thirties who turned to alcohol, gambling, and partying as a way to cope with the pressures of his role. Despite the surrounding turmoil, Ahmad Tajuddin maintained a lighthearted demeanour, often engaging his guests in lively conversations about health.

=== Things named after him ===
- Ahmad Tajuddin Primary School, a school in Kuala Belait

=== Honours ===
- Knight Commander of the Order of the British Empire (KBE) – Sir (20 September 1949)
- Honorary Companion of the Order of Saint Michael and Saint George (CMG) (6 October 1940)

== Bibliography ==
- Awang Muhaimin Haji Mohamed (2002). Sultan Ahmad Tajuddin 1924–1940: Hubungan Raja dengan Penasihat (PDF) (in Malay). Bandar Seri Begawan: Pusat Sejarah Brunei. ISBN 99917-34-79-1.
- Dr Muhammad Hadi Muhammad Melayong (2009). Memoir seorang negarawan (in Malay). Bandar Seri Begawan: Pusat Sejarah Brunei. ISBN 978-99917-34-69-9.
- Harun Abdul Majid (2007). Rebellion in Brunei: the 1962 revolt, imperialism, confrontation and oil (PDF). London: I.B. Tauris. ISBN 9781435615892.
- Horton, A. V. M. (1985). The Development of Brunei During the British Residential Era 1906-1959: A Sultanate Regenerated (PhD thesis). Hull: University of Hull.
- Horton, A. V. M. (2009). Negara Brunei Darussalam: Obituary 2009 (PDF). Vol. 40. Borneo Research Bulletin. p. 48–66.
- Hussainmiya, B. A. (1995). Sultan Omar Ali Saifuddin III and Britain, The Making of Brunei Darssalam. Kuala Lumpur: Oxford University Press.
- Hussainmiya, B. A. (2003). Resuscitating nationalism: Brunei under the Japanese Military Administration (1941-1945). Universiti Brunei Darussalam. ISSN 0387-6004.
- Hussainmiya, B. A. (October 2014). "Malcolm MacDonald and Brunei: Diplomacy with intimacy" (PDF). Journal of Southeast Asian Studies. 45 (3): 393–418. doi:10.1017/S0022463414000344.
- Kershaw, Roger (4 January 2002). Monarchy in South East Asia: The Faces of Tradition in Transition. Routledge. ISBN 978-1-134-66707-9.
- Nurul Amalina binti Zullkiflee (2019). Strategi Awang Haji Kassim dalam Usaha Menyelamatkan Sultan Ahmad Tajuddin: Satu Kajian Awal (PDF). Universiti Islam Sultan Sharif Ali.
- Nurul Amalina binti Zullkiflee (2020). "Implikasi 25 Tahun Pemerintahan Sultan Ahmad Tajuddin". International Journal of 'Umranic Studies Jurnal Antarabangsa Kajian 'Umran (in Malay). 3 (2). Brunei Darussalam: Universiti Islam Sultan Sharif Ali.
- Ooi, Keat Gin (2013). Post-War Borneo, 1945-1950: Nationalism, Empire and State-Building. Routledge. ISBN 978-1-134-05810-5.
- Pehin Orang Kaya Amar Diraja Dato Seri Utama (Dr.) Haji Awang Mohd. Jamil Al-Sufri (2010). Royal Poet Al-marhum Sultan Haji Omar 'Ali Saifuddien Sa'adul Khairi Waddien. Bandar Seri Begawan: Pusat Sejarah Brunei. ISBN 978-99917-34-74-3.
- Reece, Bob (2009). ""The Little Sultan": Ahmad Tajuddin II of Brunei, Gerard MacBryan, and. Malcolm Macdonald" (PDF). Borneo Research Bulletin. 40. Borneo Research Council. ISSN 0006-7806.
- Reece, R. H. W. (1993). The Name of Brooke, The End of White Rajah Rule In Sarawak (PDF). Kuala Lumpur: Oxford University Press.
- Saunders, Graham (1994). A History of Brunei (1st ed.). Kuala Lumpur: Oxford University Press. ISBN 9789676530493.
- Saunders, Graham (2003). A History of Brunei (2nd ed.). Abingdon: RoutledgeCurzon. ISBN 9781138863453.
- Sidhu, Jatswan S. (2009). Historical Dictionary of Brunei Darussalam (2nd ed.). Scarecrow Press. ISBN 978-0-8108-7078-9.

Regnal titles
Preceded by Muhammad Jamalul Alam II	Sultan of Brunei; 1924–1950	Succeeded by Omar Ali Saifuddien III
