= List of flag bearers for Brunei at the Olympics =

Brunei at the Olympics
- IOC code: BRU
- NOC: Brunei Darussalam National Olympic Council
- Website: www.bruneiolympic.org
- Medals: Gold 0 Silver 0 Bronze 0 Total 0

Summer appearances
- 1988; 1992; 1996; 2000; 2004; 2008; 2012; 2016; 2020; 2024

This is a list of flag bearers who have represented Brunei at the Olympics.

Flag bearers carry the national flag of their country at the opening ceremony of the Olympic Games.

#	Event year	Season	Flag bearer	Sport
1	1996	Summer	Jefri Bolkiah, Prince Abdul Hakeem	Shooting
2	2000	Summer	Haseri Asli	Athletics
3	2004	Summer	Jimmy Anak Ahar	Athletics
4	2012	Summer	Maziah Mahusin	Athletics
5	2016	Summer	Md Fakhri Ismail	Athletics
6	2020	Summer	Muhammad Isa Ahmad	Swimming
7	2024	Summer	Zeke Chan	Swimming
7	2024	Summer	Hayley Wong	Swimming

== See also ==
- Brunei at the Olympics
