= List of Brunei-related topics =

This is a list of topics related to Brunei.

== Brunei media ==
- Media of Brunei
- Borneo Bulletin
- The Brunei Times
- Media Permata
- Radio Television Brunei

== Brunei royalty ==
- Queen Saleha of Brunei
- Prince Jefri Bolkiah
- Al-Muhtadee Billah
- Pengiran Anak Sarah

=== Sultans of Brunei ===
- List of sultans of Brunei
- Abdul Momin
- Hassanal Bolkiah
- Hashim Jalilul Alam Aqamaddin
- Muhammad Jamalul Alam II
- Omar Ali Saifuddin I
- Omar Ali Saifuddin II
- Omar Ali Saifuddin III
- Ahmad Tajuddin

== Buildings and structures in Brunei ==
- Ministry of Finance Building, Brunei

=== Airports in Brunei ===
- Brunei International Airport

=== Football venues in Brunei Darussalam ===
- Sultan Hassanal Bolkiah Stadium

=== Palaces in Brunei ===
- Istana Nurul Iman
- Istana Darul Hana
- Istana Pekan
- Istana Darussalam
- Istana Mahkota
- Istana Pantai
- Istana Banderung Kayangan

=== Royal residences in Brunei ===
- Istana Nurul Iman

=== Hotels in Brunei ===
- Abdul Razak Hotel Apartments
- The Centrepoint Hotel
- The Empire Hotel and Country Club
- The Rizqun International Hotel
- Radisson Brunei Hotel
- The Holiday Lodge Hotel
- Kiulap Plaza Hotel
- Palm Garden Hotel
- Parkview Hotel (formerly known as LR Asma Hotel)
- Terrace Hotel
- Roomz Hotel, Seria
- The Swiss Hotel Apartment, Kuala Belait
- Plaza Sutera Biru, Kuala Belait
- Traders Inn Hotel
- V Hotel, Kuala Belait
- Sea View Hotel, Kuala Belait
- Riviera Hotel, Kuala Belait
- Times Hotel
- Orchid Garden Hotel
- D'Anggerek Service Apartments
- Hotel Sentosa, Kuala Belait
- Ulu Ulu Resort, Temburong
- The Capital Residence Suites

=== Parks in Brunei ===
- List of parks in Brunei Darussalam

== Cities in Brunei ==
- List of cities in Brunei
- Bandar Seri Begawan
- Bangar
- Kuala Belait
- Seria
- Tutong

== Bruneian culture ==
- Culture of Brunei

=== Bruneian music ===
- Music of Brunei

=== Sport in Brunei ===
- Brunei Darussalam at the 2006 Commonwealth Games

==== Football in Brunei ====
- Brunei national football team
- Football Association of Brunei Darussalam

==== Golf in Brunei ====
===== Golf tournaments in Brunei =====
- Brunei Open

==== Brunei at the Olympics ====
- Brunei at the 1988 Summer Olympics
- Brunei at the 1996 Summer Olympics
- Brunei at the 2000 Summer Olympics
- Brunei at the 2004 Summer Olympics
- Brunei at the 2008 Summer Olympics
- Brunei at the 2012 Summer Olympics
- Brunei at the 2016 Summer Olympics
- Brunei at the 2020 Summer Olympics

== Economy of Brunei ==
- Economy of Brunei
- Brunei dollar

== Ethnic groups in Brunei ==
- Belait
- Bisaya
- Chinese
- Dusun
- Indian
- Kedayan
- Malay
- Murut
- Tutong

== Nature in Brunei ==
- Banteng
- Bengal monitor
- Black bittern
- Black-crowned night heron
- Black-headed ibis
- Bulwer's pheasant
- Burmese python
- Cattle egret
- Chinese egret
- Chinese pond heron
- Cinnamon bittern
- Crested wood partridge
- Glossy ibis
- Great argus
- Great cormorant
- Great crested grebe
- Great egret
- Grey heron
- Indian pond heron
- Intermediate egret
- Jambu fruit dove
- Little cormorant
- Little egret
- Little grebe
- Oriental darter
- Cantor's giant softshell turtle
- Proboscis monkey
- Purple heron
- Reticulated python
- Saltwater crocodile
- Sarus crane
- Striated heron
- Tiger
- Wagler's pit viper
- Water monitor
- Wreathed hornbill
- Yellow bittern

== Geography of Brunei ==
- Geography of Brunei
- Anduki

=== Bays of Brunei ===
- Brunei Bay

=== Islands of Brunei ===
- Borneo
- Greater Sunda Islands
- Sunda Islands

==== Spratly Islands ====
- Spratly Islands
- Fiat Island
- James Shoal
- Kalayaan, Palawan
- Kingdom of Humanity
- Loaita Island
- Republic of Morac-Songhrati-Meads
- Sin Cowe Island
- Thitu Island

===== Maps of the Spratly Islands =====
- Maps of the Spratly Islands

=== Maps of Brunei ===
- Maps of Brunei

=== Rivers of Brunei ===
- Brunei River

== Government of Brunei ==
- Yang di-Pertuan Negara

=== Official residences in Brunei ===
- Istana Nurul Iman

== History of Brunei ==
- History of Brunei
- A. M. Azahari
- Borneo campaign (1945)
- Brooketon
- Brunei Revolt
- Indonesia-Malaysia confrontation
- Shannon Marketic
- North Borneo Federation
- Sultanate of Sulu
- White Rajahs

=== Elections in Brunei ===
- Politics of Brunei

== Languages of Brunei ==
- Languages of Brunei
- Brunei English

== Malay culture ==
- Adat
- Alfuros
- Bangsawan
- Bawang Putih Bawang Merah
- Bendahara
- Bomoh
- Bujang Valley
- Cape Malays
- Dangdut
- Dondang Sayang
- Malay ghost myths
- Hang Jebat
- Hang Nadim
- Hang Tuah
- Hari Raya
- Hari Raya Aidilfitri
- History of Dikir Barat
- Jenglot
- Kuda Kepang
- Kertok
- Laksamana
- Legend of Gunung Ledang
- Makam Mahsuri
- Malay Ruler
- Malay houses
- Malay titles
- Malay world
- Malaysian name
- Manananggal
- Nasi lemak
- Old Malay language
- Orang Bunian
- Orang Minyak
- Pantun
- Pontianak (folklore)
- Ronggeng
- Satay
- Sepak Takraw
- Sosatie
- Tambralinga
- Taming Sari
- Temenggung
- Toyol
- Wayang

== Military of Brunei ==
- Royal Brunei Armed Forces
- Royal Brunei Navy

== Politics of Brunei ==
- Politics of Brunei
- Legislative Council of Brunei
- Melayu Islam Beraja

=== Political parties in Brunei ===
- Brunei National Solidarity Party
- Brunei People's Awareness Party
- Brunei People's Party
- Politics of Brunei

== Schools in Brunei ==
- List of schools in Brunei
- Jerudong International School
- Paduka Seri Begawan Sultan Science College
- St. George's School, Brunei
- Sekolah Menengah Awang Semaun
- Sekolah Menengah Sayyidina Ali
- St. Andrew's School, Brunei
- Sultan Omar Ali Saifuddien College
- Duli Pengiran Muda Al-Muhtadee Billah College

== Subdivisions of Brunei ==
- Subdivisions of Brunei

=== Districts of Brunei ===
- Districts of Brunei
- Belait District
- Brunei-Muara District
- Temburong District
- Tutong District

== Health ==
- Health in Brunei

== Transport and travel in Brunei ==
- Visa requirements for Bruneian citizens
- Transport in Brunei
- Royal Brunei Airlines destinations

=== Airlines of Brunei ===
- Royal Brunei

== Non-Government Organisation (NGO) ==
- Astronomical Society of Negara Brunei Darussalam (PABD)
- BruCert
- Persekutuan Pengakap Negara Brunei Darussalam

== See also ==
- Brunei's very own star and exoplanet: Gumala & Mastika
- LGBT rights in Brunei (Gay rights)
- Lists of country-related topics - similar lists for other countries
