= Brunei at the 2012 Summer Olympics =

- IOC code: BRU
- NOC: Brunei Darussalam National Olympic Council
- Website: www.bruneiolympic.org

in London
- Competitors: 3 in 2 sports
- Flag bearers: Maziah Mahusin (opening); Anderson Lim (closing)
- Medals: Gold 0 Silver 0 Bronze 0 Total 0

Summer Olympics appearances (overview)
- 1988; 1992; 1996; 2000; 2004; 2008; 2012; 2016; 2020; 2024; 2028

Brunei, officially known as Brunei Darussalam, competed at the 2012 Summer Olympics in London, which was held from 27 July to 12 August 2012. The country's participation in London marked its fifth appearance in the Summer Olympics since its debut in the 1988 Summer Olympics. They returned to the Olympics after missing the 2008 Games when they were the only country expelled from participating.

The Brunei delegation included three athletes: Ak Hafiy Tajuddin Rositi, Maziah Mahusin, and swimmer Anderson Lim. Mahusin was the first woman to represent Brunei at the Olympic Games and Lim's appearance made him the country's first Olympic swimmer. All three athletes qualified for the Games through wildcard places because they failed to meet the required qualifying times for their events. Mahusin was the flag bearer for the opening ceremony while Lim held it at the closing ceremony. All three athletes failed to advance beyond the heat stages of their respective events, but Mahusin and Lim achieved new national records in athletics and swimming.

== Background ==
Although Brunei first participated in the Summer Olympics in the 1988 Summer Olympics in Seoul, South Korea, it was only represented by one official. It would not be until the 1996 Summer Olympics in Atlanta, United States that the country would send athletes to the Games. Since then, it has participated in five Summer Olympic Games between its debut and the 2012 Summer Olympics in London, England. The country was the sole member of the International Olympic Committee not to participate in the 2008 Summer Olympics in Beijing; it had intended to do so, but was excluded on the day of the opening ceremony after failing to register any athletes. No Brunei athlete had ever won a medal at the Summer Olympics before the 2012 London Games. Brunei competed in the London Summer Games from 27 July to 12 August 2012.

On 13 February it was agreed by Brunei's Ministry of Culture, Youth and Sports committee that one participant in athletics and swimming would be sent to the Games. In the months prior to the London Games, Brunei attracted media attention as it was noted that the nation was one of only three countries—along with Saudi Arabia and Qatar—never to have sent a female athlete to the Olympics. The delegation to London comprised runners Ak Hafiy Tajuddin Rositi and Maziah Mahusin and swimmer Anderson Lim. Along with the three athletes, the Brunei Olympic team's delegation was led by chef de mission Hj Mohd Zamri Dato Paduka Hj Hamdani. Mahusin was selected as the flag bearer for the opening ceremony while Lim held it at the closing ceremony.

== Athletics ==
Ak Hafiy Tajuddin Rositi was the oldest athlete to compete for Brunei at the London Games at age 21. He had not participated in any previous Olympic Games. Rositi qualified for the Games via a wildcard because his fastest time of 49.81 seconds, set in the 2011 Asian Athletics Championships Men's 400 metres, was 4.11 seconds slower than the "B" qualifying standard for the men's 400 metres. He was drawn in the event's third heat on 4 August, finishing eighth (and last) out of all participants, with a time of 48.67 seconds. Overall Rositi finished 45th out of 47 runners, (Note: Two athletes were not classified, and nine did not finish.) and was unable to advance into the semi-finals because he was 3.67 seconds slower than the slowest athlete in his heat who made the later stages.

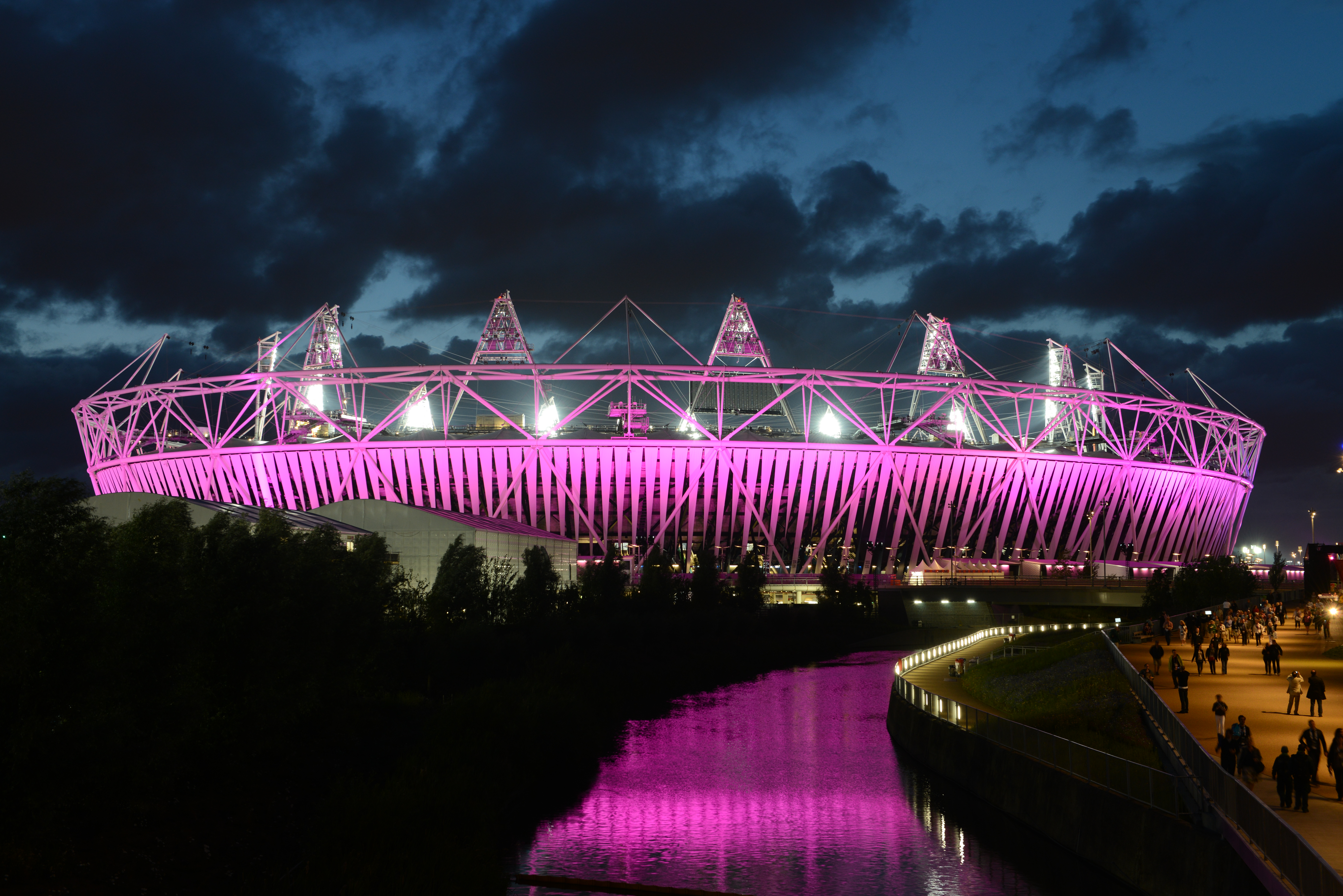
The London Olympic Stadium, where Rositi and Mahusin competed in athletics events.

At age 19 and competing at her first Summer Olympics, Maziah Mahusin was the first female athlete to represent Brunei at the Games. She qualified for the Games through a wildcard place because her best time of one minute and 1.14 seconds, recorded at the Southeast Asian Youth Athletics Championships, was 13.59 seconds slower than the "B" qualifying standard for the women's 400 metres. In an interview with Reuters before the Games Mahusin said she felt "deeply honoured" to represent her country and that it was "a dream come true" that she was selected. She felt the inclusion of herself in the Brunei Olympic team would encourage her nation to pursue better standards in sport. Mahusin took part in the contest's sixth heat on 3 August, finishing seventh out of eight runners with a time of 59.28 seconds. Her time established a new Bruneian national record. Overall Mahusin ranked 41st out of 45 athletes. (Note: Three athletes were not classified, and one was disqualified.) She did not progress into the semi-final after finishing 7.15 seconds slower than the slowest qualifier. Afterwards, Mahusin stated she did not expect to set a new national record having been unwell beforehand but hoped to compete at the Rio Olympics.

Key

- Note–Ranks given for track events are within the athlete's heat only
- NR = National record

Men

| Athlete | Event | Heat | | Semifinal | | Final | |
| Athlete | Event | Result | Rank | Result | Rank | Result | Rank |
|---|---|---|---|---|---|---|---|
| Ak Hafiy Tajuddin Rositi | 400 m | 48.67 | 8 | Did not advance | | | |

Women

| Athlete | Event | Heat | | Semifinal | | Final | |
| Athlete | Event | Result | Rank | Result | Rank | Result | Rank |
|---|---|---|---|---|---|---|---|
| Maziah Mahusin | 400 m | 59.28 NR | 6 | Did not advance | | | |

== Swimming ==
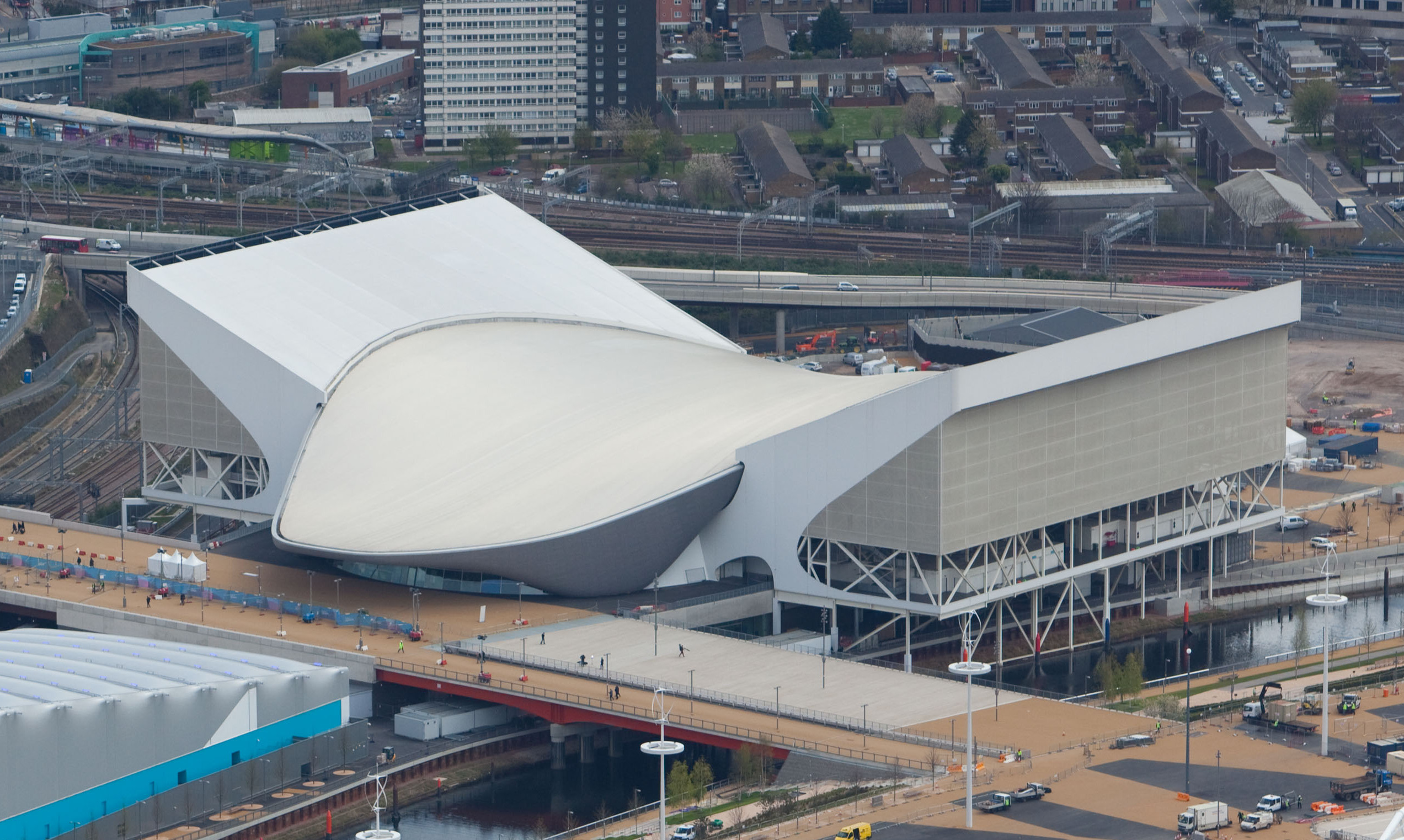
The London Aquatics Centre where Lim competed in the men's 200 metre freestyle event

Anderson Lim was the youngest person to represent Brunei at the London Olympic Games at age 16. He had not taken part in any previous Olympic Games. Lim qualified for the Games by being awarded a universality place by FINA because his fastest time of two minutes and 6.40 seconds did not reach the "A" (Olympic Qualifying Time) or "B" (FINA/Olympic Invititional Time) standard entry times for the men's 200 metre freestyle. It marked Brunei's first appearance in Olympic swimming competition. He was drawn in the contest's first heat on 29 July, finishing third (and last) of three swimmers with a time of two minutes and 2.26 seconds. Lim's time established a new Bruneian national swimming record. Overall he placed 40th (and last) of all competitors, (Note: One swimmer, Mads Glæsner, did not start.) and was unable to progress to the semi-finals. Lim finished 14.71 seconds slower than the slowest athlete who qualified for the later stages.

Men

| Athlete | Event | Heat | | Semifinal | | Final | |
| Athlete | Event | Time | Rank | Time | Rank | Time | Rank |
|---|---|---|---|---|---|---|---|
| Anderson Lim | 200 m freestyle | 2:02.26 NR | 40 | Did not advance | | | |

== See also ==
- Brunei at the 2012 Summer Paralympics
