= List of Bruneian records in athletics =

The following are the national records in athletics in Brunei maintained by Brunei's national athletics federation: Brunei Darussalam Athletics Federation (BDAF).

== Outdoor ==
=== Men ===
Event	Record	Athlete	Date	Meet	Place	Ref.
100 m	10.59 (±0.0 m/s)	Mohamed Fakhri Ismail	9 June 2015	Southeast Asian Games	Kallang, Singapore	
100 m	10.48 (+1.2 m/s)	Muhd Noor Firdaus Ar-Rasyid	30 September 2023		Sabah, Malaysia	
200 m	21.39 (−0.6 m/s)	Muhd Noor Firdaus Ar-Rasyid	23 August 2017	Southeast Asian Games	Bukit Jalil, Malaysia	
400 m	48.53	Mohamed Arman Hj Sanip	10 July 1999		Taverny, France	
800 m	1:55.05	Jimmy Anak Ahar	10 September 2002		Kota Kinabalu, Malaysia	
1500 m	3:57.51	Jimmy Anak Ahar	17 May 2005		Darwin, Australia	
3000 m	9:48.21	Hj Mohamedd Syahmi Fakrullah	15 May 2007		Darwin, Australia	
3000 m	9:41.92	Abdullah Abbas bin Awg Abdullah	3 June 2024	ASEAN School Games	Danang, Vietnam	
5000 m	15:28.9	B.J.R. Keneenthep	15 July 1973		Bandar Seri Begawan, Brunei	
10,000 m	33:56.35	Sifli Anak Ahar	8 December 2003	Southeast Asian Games	Hanoi, Vietnam	
Half marathon	1:15:08	Sifli Anak Ahar	6 December 2009		Singapore	
Half marathon	1:13:38	Ruzaini Mahadi	6 December 2025	Langkawi International Half Marathon	Langkawi, Malaysia	
Marathon	2:43:32	Sifli Anak Ahar	10 December 2006		Bandar Seri Begawan, Brunei	
Marathon	2:37:34	Ruzaini Mahadi	5 July 2026	Gold Coast Marathon	Queensland, Australia	
110 m hurdles	15.51	Mohamed Aries Mujang	22 July 1995		Kuching, Malaysia	
400 m hurdles	54.64	Kaderi Bujang	30 November 1993	Asian Championships	Manila, Philippines	
3000 m steeplechase	9:42.35	Roslan Baha	22 July 1987	Asian Championships	Singapore	
High jump	2.04 m	Demingo Kapal	7 June 1992		Bandar Seri Begawan, Brunei	
Pole vault	4.70 m	Demingo Kapal	3 September 1995		Singapore	
Long jump	7.04 m	Daniel Chung	7 August 1993		Kota Kinabalu, Malaysia	
Triple jump	14.65 m	Chang Siew Khin	27 July 1968		Kuching, Malaysia	
Triple jump	14.65 m	Haj Shari Mohamed Shah Johan	24 September 2005		Penang, Malaysia	
Shot put	15.43 m	Lim Chee Wee	9 August 1999	Southeast Asian Games	Bandar Seri Begawan, Brunei	
Discus throw	44.80 m	Aziz Al-Ukbar Badaruddin	1 November 1998		Bandar Seri Begawan, Brunei	
Hammer throw	42.32 m	Mohd Hadi Ezlan Abdull Sebad	2 December 2009	3rd Borneo Games	Bandar Seri Begawan, Brunei	
Javelin throw	55.84 m	Jean Merbai Ak Biju	12 September 2002		Kota Kinabalu, Malaysia	
Decathlon	5684 pts	Demingo Kapal	13–14 June 1993	Southeast Asian Games	Singapore	
Decathlon	100m / Long jump / Shot put / High jump / 400m / 110m H / Discus / Pole vault / Javelin / 1500m; 12.05 / 6.90 m / 9.60 m / 1.92 m / 54.58 / 17.11 / 31.02 m / 4.20 m / 42.20 m / 6:16.93					
20 km walk (road)						
50 km walk (road)						
4 × 100 m relay	40.21	Brunei; Muhd Faaizul bin Abdullah; Abdul Rahim Abdullah; Muhd Noor Firdaus Ar-Rasyid; Mohamed Fakhri Ismail	25 August 2017	Southeast Asian Games	Bukit Jalil, Malaysia	
4 × 400 m relay	3:21.41	Brunei; K. Jaafar; Wee Hong Boon; Mohamed Arman Hj Sanip; S. Hj Nordin	3 December 1991	Southeast Asian Games	Manila, Philippines	

=== Women ===
Event	Record	Athlete	Date	Meet	Place	Ref.
100 m	12.02	Alinawati Ali Akbar	8 August 1999	Southeast Asian Games	Bandar Seri Begawan, Brunei	
200 m	25.22	Alinawati Ali Akbar	15 September 2001	Southeast Asian Games	Kuala Lumpur, Malaysia	
400 m	59.28	Maziah Mahusin	3 August 2012	Olympic Games	London, United Kingdom	
800 m	2:26.12	Shana Marie Mobo Holmes	25 November 2015		Bandar Seri Begawan, Brunei	
1500 m	5:08.08	Ho Kui Hui	19 July 1986		Kuching, Malaysia	
3000 m	11:36.5	Roziah Lahing	20 March 1988		Bandar Seri Begawan, Brunei	
5000 m	23:51.32	Safria Fahanina Yayan	22 June 2008		Bandar Seri Begawan, Brunei	
5000 m	22:10.43	Siti Nur Hafizatul Hamiroldzam	12 November 2023	RS Grand Final Meet	Kota Kinabalu, Malaysia	
10,000 m						
Marathon	3:56.11	Jacqueline Teo Cheng Nee	7 December 2008	Singapore Marathon	Singapore	
100 m hurdles	17.08	Norhayati Hj Yassin	19 July 1986		Kuching, Malaysia	
400 m hurdles	1:08.35	Maziah Mahusin	23 May 2010		Singapore	
3000 m steeplechase						
High jump	1.60 m	Alinawati Ali Akbar	28 April 1999		Manila, Philippines	
Pole vault						
Long jump	5.14 m	Rose Chong	14 July 1962		Kuching, Malaya	
Triple jump	10.58 m	Nuramalina Binti Bakir	2 December 2009	3rd Borneo Games	Bandar Seri Begawan, Brunei	
Shot put	13.92 m	Tea Ai Seng	8 August 1997		Bandar Seri Begawan, Brunei	
Discus throw	37.14 m	Tea Ai Seng	11 May 1997		Darwin, Australia	
Hammer throw	28.10 m	Michelle Charlene Basir	2 December 2009	3rd Borneo Games	Bandar Seri Begawan, Brunei	
Javelin throw	30.18 m	Alinawati Ali Akbar	27 March 2017		Bandar Seri Begawan, Brunei	
Heptathlon	2538 pts	Sallyahrinah Hj Yahya	30 April–1 May 1999		Manila, Philippines	
Heptathlon	100m H / High jump / Shot put / 200m / Long jump / Javelin / 800m; 21.2 / 1.30 m / 6.78 m / 26.9 / 3.23 m / 12.55 m / 2:36.5					
20 km walk (road)						
50 km walk (road)						
4 × 100 m relay	49.07	Brunei; Marsita Kamal Jumaat; J. Kassim; Sallyahrinah Hj Yahya; Alinawati Ali Akbar	19 June 1999		Petaling Jaya, Malaysia	
4 × 400 m relay	4:08.4	Brunei; Marsita Kamal Jumaat; Noorhanani Hamid; J. Tan; Alinawati Ali Akbar	1 May 1999		Manila, Philippines	

== Indoor ==
=== Men ===
Event	Record	Athlete	Date	Meet	Place	Ref.
60 m	7.44	Shahriful Bahrin Zainal	7 March 2008	World Championships	Valencia, Spain	
200 m						
400 m	51.02	Ak. Hafiy Tajuddin Rositi	9 March 2012	World Championships	Istanbul, Turkey	
800 m						
1500 m						
3000 m						
60 m hurdles						
High jump	1.96 m	Abdul Yahya	24 February 2010	Steel Cup	Sheffield, United Kingdom	
Pole vault						
Long jump						
Triple jump	11.74 m	Abdul Yahya	20 November 2010	Northern Athletics Open Meeting	Sheffield, United Kingdom	
Shot put						
Heptathlon						
Heptathlon	60m / Long jump / Shot put / High jump / 60m H / Pole vault / 1000m					
5000 m walk						
4 × 400 m relay						

=== Women ===
Event	Record	Athlete	Date	Meet	Place	Ref.
60 m	7.50	Hafizeh Matasan Nur Sari	27 September 2005	Women's Islamic Games	Tehran, Iran	
200 m						
400 m	1:03.69	Maziah Mahusin	9 March 2012	World Championships	Istanbul, Turkey	
800 m						
1500 m						
3000 m						
60 m hurdles						
High jump						
Pole vault						
Long jump						
Triple jump						
Shot put						
Pentathlon						
Pentathlon	60m H / High jump / Shot put / Long jump / 800m					
3000 m walk						
4 × 400 m relay						
