= Brunei at the 2000 Summer Olympics =

- IOC code: BRU
- NOC: Brunei Darussalam National Olympic Council
- Website: www.bruneiolympic.org

in Sydney
- Competitors: 2 in 2 sports
- Flag bearer: Haseri Asli
- Medals: Gold 0 Silver 0 Bronze 0 Total 0

Summer Olympics appearances (overview)
- 1988; 1992; 1996; 2000; 2004; 2008; 2012; 2016; 2020; 2024

Brunei, as Brunei Darussalam, competed at the 2000 Summer Olympics in Sydney, Australia, which were held from 15 September to 1 October 2000. The country's participation in Sydney marked its second competing appearance at the Summer Olympics since its debut in 1996. The delegation of the nation consisted of two athletes: sprinter Haseri Asli and shooter Prince Abdul Hakeem Jefri Bolkiah.

Asli was the first athletics competitor to compete for Brunei at the Olympics and was designated the flagbearer for the opening ceremony. He competed in the heats of the men's 100 metres though did not advance further. Making his second appearance, Hakeem competed in the qualification round of the men's skeet and also did not advance further. Thus, Brunei's wait to win an Olympic medal continued.

== Background ==
The 2000 Summer Olympics were held in Sydney, Australia, from 15 September to 1 October 2000. This edition of the games marked Brunei's second appearance at the Summer Olympics since its debut at the 1996 Summer Olympics in Atlanta, United States. The nation had never won a medal at the Olympic Games, with its best finish coming from Prince Abdul Hakeem Jefri Bolkiah who had placed 49th in the men's skeet at the 1996 Summer Games. Haseri Asli was designated as the flag bearer for Brunei at the opening ceremony.

== Competitors ==
In total, 2 athletes represented Brunei at the 2000 Summer Olympics in Sydney, New South Wales, Australia across two different sports.

Sport	Men	Women	Total
Athletics	1	0	1
Shooting	1	0	1
Total	2	0	2

== Athletics ==
The athletics events were held at Stadium Australia. Asli was the first athletics competitor for Brunei at the Olympics after he had competed in his event, the men's 100 metres. Coming into the event, he had a personal best of 10.78 seconds. He competed in the heats of his event on 22 September against eight other athletes. He ran in a time of 11.11 seconds and placed eighth; he did not advance further.

Track and road events
Athlete	Event	Heat		2nd round		Semifinal		Final	
Athlete	Event	Result	Rank	Result	Rank	Result	Rank	Result	Rank
Haseri Asli	Men's 100 m	11.11	8	did not advance					

== Shooting ==
The shooting events were held at the Sydney International Shooting Centre. Prince Abdul Hakeem Jefri Bolkiah competed in the qualification round of the men's skeet on 22 September. He shot a total of 114 targets out of a possible score of 125, placing 45th in the round. He did not advance to the finals.

Shooter	Event	Final	
Shooter	Event	Score	Rank
Prince Abdul Hakeem Jefri Bolkiah	Men's skeet	114	45
