= Brunei at the 1996 Summer Olympics =

- IOC code: BRU
- NOC: Brunei Darussalam National Olympic Council
- Website: www.bruneiolympic.org

in Atlanta
- Competitors: 1 in 1 sport
- Flag bearer: Abdul Hakeem Jefri Bolkiah
- Medals: Gold 0 Silver 0 Bronze 0 Total 0

Summer Olympics appearances (overview)
- 1988; 1992; 1996; 2000; 2004; 2008; 2012; 2016; 2020; 2024

Brunei, as Brunei Darussalam, competed at the 1996 Summer Olympics in Atlanta, United States, which were held from 19 July to 4 August 1996. The country's participation in Atlanta marked its first competing appearance at the Summer Olympics, with an observer appearing at the two previous Summer Games. The Bruneian athlete delegation consisted of one athlete, Prince Abdul Hakeem Jefri Bolkiah, who would compete in shooting.

Hakeem would be designated at the flag bearer for Brunei at the opening ceremony. He competed in the men's skeet, getting a score of 112 points and did not advance further. Thus, Brunei has yet to win an Olympic medal.

== Background ==
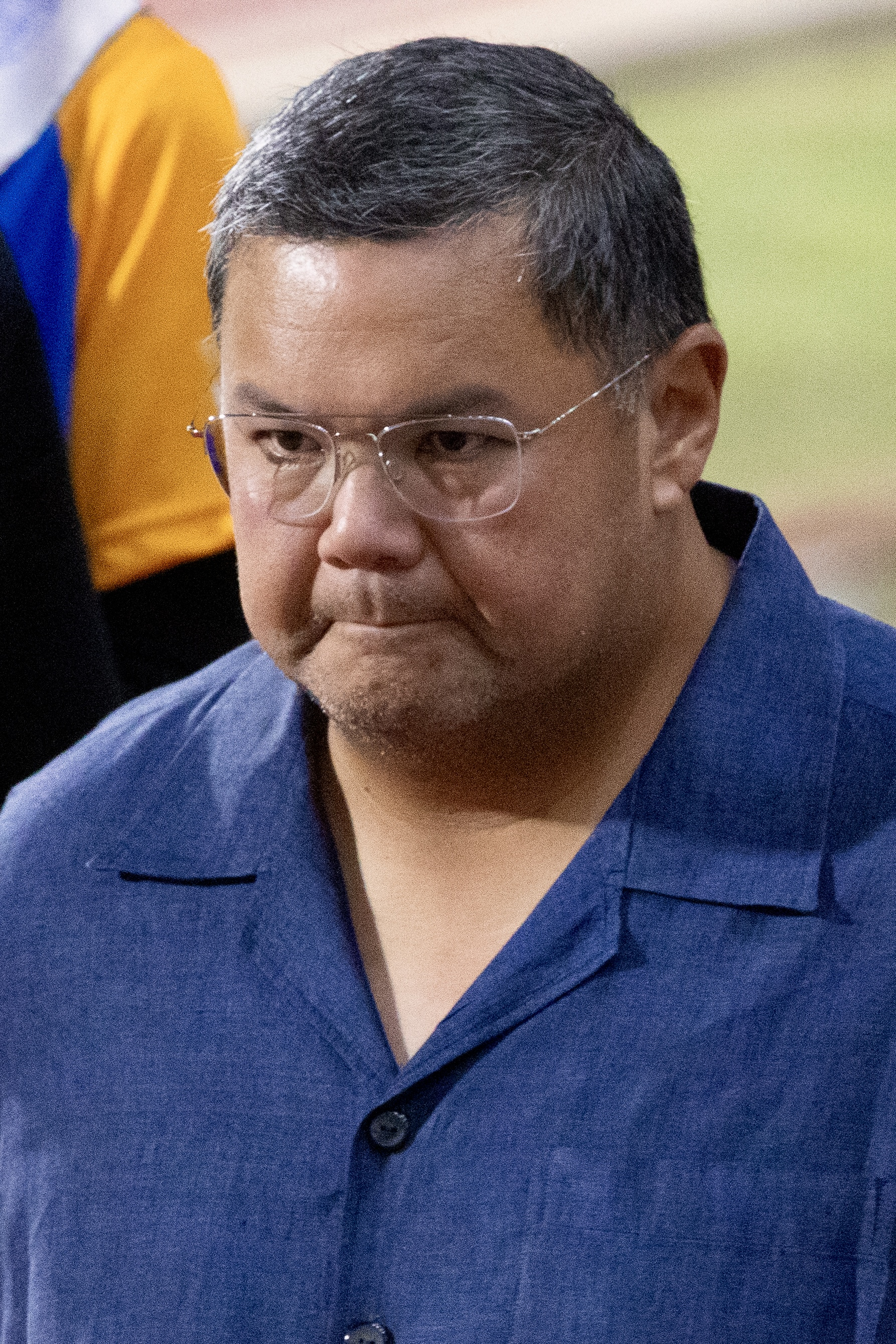
Hakeem (pictured in 2024)

The 1996 Summer Olympics were held in Atlanta, United States, from 19 July to 4 August 1996. In the previous games at the 1988 Summer Olympics in Seoul, South Korea, and the 1992 Summer Olympics in Barcelona, Spain, the Brunei Darussalam National Olympic Council had only sent one observer at each of the two editions of the games. The 1996 Summer Olympics would be the first Games that Brunei would send a competing delegation. The nation would send Prince Abdul Hakeem Jefri Bolkiah, who would compete in shooting and be the first Bruneian Olympian. For the opening ceremony, he was designated as the flag bearer for Brunei.

== Competitors ==
The following is the list of number of competitors in the Games.

Sport	Men	Women	Total
Shooting	1	0	1
Total	1	0	1

== Shooting ==
The shooting events were held at the Wolf Creek Shooting Complex. Hakeem competed in the qualification round of the men's skeet event on 26 July. He shot a total of 112 targets in a possible amount of 125 targets, and placed 49th out of the 54 athletes that competed. He did not advance to the finals. The eventual winner of the event was Ennio Falco of Italy who had set an Olympic record in the process.

Shooter	Event	Final	
Shooter	Event	Score	Rank
Prince Abdul Hakeem Jefri Bolkiah	Men's skeet	112	49
