= Brunei at the 2020 Summer Olympics =

- IOC code: BRU
- NOC: Brunei Darussalam National Olympic Council
- Website: www.bruneiolympic.org

in Tokyo, Japan July 23, 2021 – August 8, 2021
- Competitors: 2 in 2 sports
- Flag bearer (opening): Muhammad Isa Ahmad
- Flag bearer (closing): N/A
- Medals: Gold 0 Silver 0 Bronze 0 Total 0

Summer Olympics appearances (overview)
- 1988; 1992; 1996; 2000; 2004; 2008; 2012; 2016; 2020; 2024

Brunei, officially known as Brunei Darussalam, competed at the 2020 Summer Olympics in Tokyo. Originally scheduled to take place from 24 July to 9 August 2020, the Games were postponed to 23 July to 8 August 2021, due to the COVID-19 pandemic. This was the nation's eighth appearance at the Summer Olympics since its debut at the 1988 Summer Olympics. Brunei failed to register any athletes in two editions of the Games: 1992 in Barcelona and 2008 in Beijing.

== Competitors ==
The following is the list of number of competitors in the Games.

Sport	Men	Women	Total
Athletics	1	0	1
Swimming	1	0	1
Total	2	0	2

== Athletics ==
Brunei received a universality slot from the World Athletics to send a male track and field athlete to the Olympics.

Key

- Note–Ranks given for track events are within the athlete's heat only
- Q = Qualified for the next round
- q = Qualified for the next round as a fastest loser or, in field events, by position without achieving the qualifying target
- NR = National record
- N/A = Round not applicable for the event
- Bye = Athlete not required to compete in round

Track & road events

Athlete	Event	Heat		Semifinal		Final	
Athlete	Event	Result	Rank	Result	Rank	Result	Rank
Muhd Noor Firdaus Ar-Rasyid	Men's 200 m	21.83	7	Did not advance			

== Swimming ==
Brunei received a universality invitation from FINA to send a top-ranked male swimmer in his respective individual events to the Olympics, based on the FINA Points System of June 28, 2021.

Athlete	Event	Heat		Semifinal		Final	
Athlete	Event	Time	Rank	Time	Rank	Time	Rank
Muhammad Isa Ahmad	Men's 100 m breaststroke	1:08.65	47	Did not advance			
