= Brunei at the 2024 Summer Olympics =

- IOC code: BRU
- NOC: Brunei Darussalam National Olympic Council
- Website: www.bruneiolympic.org

in Paris, France 26 July 2024 – 11 August 2024
- Competitors: 3 in 2 sports
- Flag bearer (opening): Zeke Chan & Hayley Wong
- Flag bearer (closing): Hayley Wong
- Medals: Gold 0 Silver 0 Bronze 0 Total 0

Summer Olympics appearances (overview)
- 1988; 1992; 1996; 2000; 2004; 2008; 2012; 2016; 2020; 2024

Brunei (officially Brunei Darussalam) competed at the 2024 Summer Olympics in Paris from 26 July to 11 August 2024. It was the nation's eighth appearance at the Summer Olympics after its debut at the 1988 Summer Olympics.

Brunei was represented by three athletes who competed across two sports. Zeke Chan and Hayley Wong served as the country's flag-bearers during the opening ceremony and Wong carried the flag during the closing ceremony. Brunei did not win any medals in the Games.

== Background ==
The Brunei Darussalam National Olympic Council was formed in 1984 and recognized by the International Olympic Committee in the same year. It made its first Olympics appearance as an independent nation at the 1988 Summer Olympics. The current edition marked its eighth appearance at the Summer Games.

The 2024 Summer Olympics were held in Paris, France between 26 July and 11 August 2024. Brunei was represented by three athletes who competed in two sports. This was the first time Brunei sent female competitors for the Olympics. Zeke Chan and Hayley Wong served as the country's flag-bearers during the opening ceremony and Wong carried the flag during the closing ceremony. Brunei did not win a medal at the Games.

== Competitors ==
Brunei sent a contingent of three athletes.

Sport	Men	Women	Total
Athletics	1	0	1
Swimming	1	1	2
Total	2	1	3

== Athletics ==
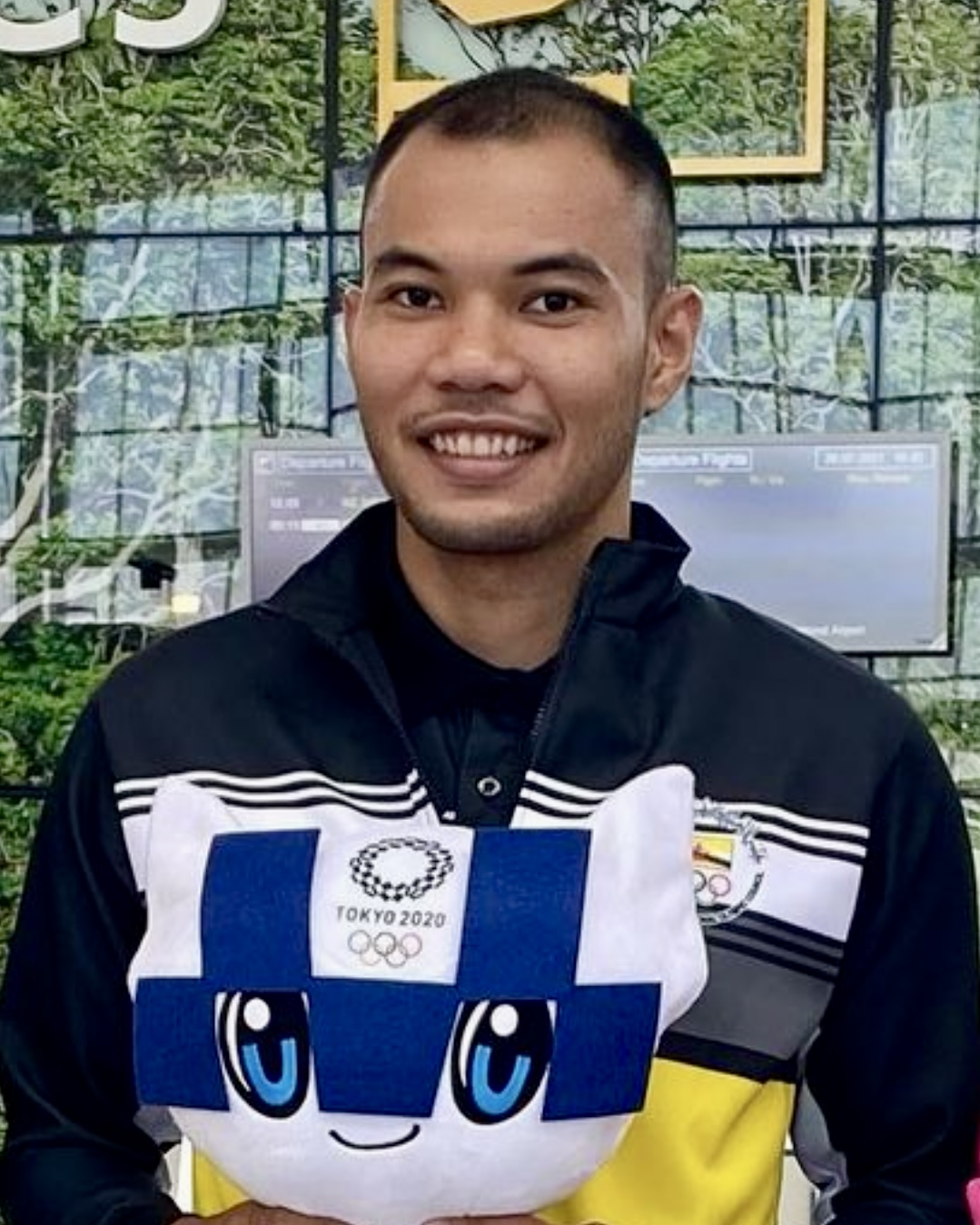
Muhd Noor Firdaus Ar-Rasyid participated in athletics

As per the governing body World Athletics (WA), a NOC was allowed to enter up to three qualified athletes in each individual event and one qualified relay team if the Olympic Qualifying Standards (OQS) had been met during the qualifying period at the events approved by WA. The remaining places are allocated based on the World Athletics Rankings which were derived from the average of the best five results for an athlete over the designated qualifying period, weighted by the importance of the meet. The qualification window for race events on the program was from 1 July 2023 to 30 June 2024. Brunei qualified one sprinter to compete at the 2024 Summer Olympics.

Muhd Noor Firdaus Ar-Rasyid participated in the men's 100 m event. Though he achieved a season's best time of 10.86 seconds in the preliminary heats, he failed to advance to main qualifying heats.

Key

- Note–Ranks given for track events are within the athlete's heat only
- Q = Qualified for the next round
- q = Qualified for the next round as a fastest loser or, in field events, by position without achieving the qualifying target
- NR = National record
- N/A = Round not applicable for the event
- Bye = Athlete not required to compete in round

Track events

Athlete	Event	Preliminary		Heat		Semifinal		Final	
Athlete	Event	Time	Rank	Time	Rank	Time	Rank	Time	Rank
Muhd Noor Firdaus Ar-Rasyid	Men's 100 m	10.86 SB	8	Did not advance					

== Swimming ==
As per the World Aquatics guidelines, a NOC was permitted to enter a maximum of two qualified athletes in each individual event, who have achieved the Olympic Qualifying Time. One athlete per event will be allowed to enter if they meet the Olympic Selection Time if the quota is not filled. NOCs were allowed to enter swimmers (one per gender) under a universality place even if no one achieved the standard entry times. Brunei was awarded two universality quota places in swimming.

The swimming events were held at the Paris La Défense Arena. In the men's 100 m backstroke event, Zeke Chan finished 45th out of the 46 competitors with a time of over one minute and failed to qualify for the next round. In the women's 50 m freestyle event, Hayley Wong endured a similar fate after she finished in 50th place amongst the 78 competitors.

Athlete	Event	Heat		Semifinal		Final	
Athlete	Event	Time	Rank	Time	Rank	Time	Rank
Zeke Chan	Men's 100 m backstroke	1:00.38	45	Did not advance			
Hayley Wong	Women's 50 m freestyle	28.52	50	Did not advance			

Qualifiers for the latter rounds (Q) of all events were decided on a time only basis, therefore positions shown are overall results versus competitors in all heats.
