= Brunei at the Paralympics =

- IPC code: BRU
- Medals: Gold 0 Silver 0 Bronze 0 Total 0

Summer appearances
- 2012; 2016–2024

Brunei made its Paralympic Games debut at the 2012 Summer Paralympics in London, sending one representative to compete in athletics.

== See also ==
- Brunei at the Olympics
