= Lin Zhiwei =

Lin Zhiwei may refer to:

- Anderson Lim, Bruneian former competitive swimmer
- Jamus Lim, Singaporean politician
