= Athletics at the 2012 Summer Olympics – Women's 400 metres =

Women's 400 metres at the Games of the XXX Olympiad
- Venue: Olympic Stadium
- Date: 3–5 August
- Competitors: 49 from 40 nations
- Winning time: 49.55

Medalists
1st place, gold medalist(s)		Sanya Richards-Ross	United States
2nd place, silver medalist(s)		Christine Ohuruogu	Great Britain
3rd place, bronze medalist(s)		DeeDee Trotter	United States

Official Video

The women's 400 metres competition at the 2012 Summer Olympics took place from 3 to 5 August at the Olympic Stadium, in London.

London rains became a part of the qualifying round, where the favorites tried to make the final with minimum effort. 52.11 was the slowest qualifying time, though Tjipekapora Herunga managed a 52.31 for the slowest automatic qualifier.

In the semi-final, the weather was better. In the first semi, Sanya Richards-Ross was matched with the defending champion Christine Ohuruogu, with only two automatic qualifiers. At the gun, Richards-Ross took off, making up most of the stagger on Krivoshapka to her immediate outside. Relaxing the backstretch but exploding on the second turn, Richards-Ross had built up a huge lead, then slowed considerably on the home stretch letting Ohuruogu gain almost all the lead back. The second semi turned into a match race between Francena McCorory and world champion Amantle Montsho, running stride for stride together far ahead of the others until Montsho dipped to place first. The third semi was a much faster affair. 2012 World leader Antonina Krivoshapka took the race out as if it were the final, making up the stagger during the first turn and coming off the turn with a huge lead. She also slowed on the homestretch and looked to struggle to hold off DeeDee Trotter and Novlene Williams-Mills. Third place Williams-Mills became a time qualifier faster than the previous two heats.

In the final, unlike the memorable race four years earlier, where Richards-Ross burned herself out building a huge lead, this time Krivoshapka had the large lead through the halfway mark and held it to the home stretch, with the three Americans spread across the track a step behind. McCorory and Krivoshapka began to struggle as first Trotter, then Richards-Ross seized the lead which she would not relinquish, winning by 0.15 seconds. Before the home crowd, Ohuruogu approached the finish line with a trademark late surge, coming from several steps off the pace to catch Deedee Trotter for the silver medal, Trotter holding on for the bronze.

== Competition format ==
The women's 400m competition consisted of heats (Round 1), Semifinals and a Final.

== Records ==
Prior to the competition, the existing World and Olympic records were as follows.

World record	Marita Koch (GDR)	47.60	Canberra, Australia	6 October 1985
Olympic record	Marie-José Pérec (FRA)	48.25	Atlanta, United States	29 July 1996
2012 World leading	Antonina Krivoshapka (RUS)	49.16	Cheboksary, Russia	5 July 2012

== Schedule ==
All times are British Summer Time (UTC+1)

Date	Time	Round
Friday, 3 August 2012	12:00	Round 1
Saturday, 4 August 2012	20:05	Semifinals
Sunday, 5 August 2012	21:10	Finals

== Heats ==
Official video of First Round

- Entrants as of 27 July 2012.

Qual. rule: first 3 of each heat (Q) plus the 3 fastest times (q) qualified.

=== Heat 1 ===
Rank	Athlete	Nation	Time	Notes
1	Francena McCorory	United States	50.78	Q
2	Christine Ohuruogu	Great Britain	50.80	Q
3	Joy Nakhumicha Sakari	Kenya	51.85	Q, SB
4	Joanne Cuddihy	Ireland	52.09	q
5	Geisa Aparecida Coutinho	Brazil	53.43	
6	Marina Maslenko	Kazakhstan	53.66	
7	Zamzam Mohamed Farah	Somalia	1:20.48	

=== Heat 2 ===
Rank	Athlete	Nation	Time	Notes
1	Amantle Montsho	Botswana	50.40	Q
2	Christine Day	Jamaica	51.05	Q
3	Shana Cox	Great Britain	52.01	Q
4	Aliann Pompey	Guyana	52.10	q, =SB
5	Afia Charles	Antigua and Barbuda	54.25	
6	Ingrid Yahoska Narvaez	Nicaragua	59.55	=SB
—N/a	Shaunae Miller	Bahamas	—N/a	DNF

=== Heat 3 ===
Rank	Athlete	Nation	Time	Notes
1	DeeDee Trotter	United States	50.87	Q
2	Rosemarie Whyte	Jamaica	50.90	Q
3	Jenna Martin	Canada	51.98	Q
4	Omolara Omotosho	Nigeria	52.11	q
5	Raysa Sánchez	Dominican Republic	52.47	
6	Aauri Bokesa	Spain	53.67	
7	Zourah Ali	Djibouti	1:05.37	

=== Heat 4 ===
Rank	Athlete	Nation	Time	Notes
1	Sanya Richards-Ross	United States	51.78	Q
2	Carol Rodríguez	Puerto Rico	52.19	Q
3	Tjipekapora Herunga	Namibia	52.31	Q
4	Pınar Saka	Turkey	52.38	
5	Sviatlana Usovich	Belarus	52.40	
6	Phumlile Ndzinisa	Swaziland	53.95	
7	Hristina Risteska	Macedonia	1:00.86	

=== Heat 5 ===
Rank	Athlete	Nation	Time	Notes
DSQ	Antonina Krivoshapka	Russia	50.75	Q
2	Alina Lohvynenko	Ukraine	52.08	Q
3	Lee McConnell	Great Britain	52.23	Q
4	Moa Hjelmer	Sweden	52.86	
5	Ambwene Simukonda	Malawi	54.20	NR
6	Danielle Alakija	Fiji	56.77	
—N/a	Kanika Beckles	Grenada	—N/a	DNS

=== Heat 6 ===
Rank	Athlete	Nation	Time	Notes
1	Novlene Williams-Mills	Jamaica	50.88	Q
2	Nataliya Pyhyda	Ukraine	51.09	Q, PB
3	Libania Grenot	Italy	52.13	Q
4	Joelma Sousa	Brazil	52.69	
5	Bianca Răzor	Romania	52.83	
6	Maziah Mahusin	Brunei	59.28	NR
—N/a	Kineke Alexander	Saint Vincent and the Grenadines	—N/a	DNF

=== Heat 7 ===
Rank	Athlete	Nation	Time	Notes
1	Regina George	Nigeria	51.24	Q
2	Yuliya Gushchina	Russia	51.54	Q
3	Marlena Wesh	Haiti	51.98	Q
4	Amy Mbacké Thiam	Senegal	53.23	
5	Olesea Cojuhari	Moldova	53.64	
6	Graciela Martins	Guinea-Bissau	58.30	
—N/a	Jennifer Padilla	Colombia	—N/a	DQ

- Jennifer Padilla originally finished in third place with a time of 51.74, but was disqualified due to lane infringement. As a result, Marlena Wesh moved up to third position to qualify for the semi-finals.

Official Video of Semifinal Round

== Semi-finals ==
Qual. rule: first 2 of each heat (Q) plus the 2 fastest times (q) qualified.

=== Heat 1 ===
Rank	Athlete	Nation	Time	Notes
1	Sanya Richards-Ross	United States	50.07	Q
2	Christine Ohuruogu	Great Britain	50.22	Q, SB
3	Rosemarie Whyte	Jamaica	50.98	q
4	Yuliya Gushchina	Russia	51.66	
5	Joanne Cuddihy	Ireland	51.88	
6	Tjipekapora Herunga	Namibia	52.53	
7	Jenna Martin	Canada	52.83	
8	Joy Nakhumicha Sakari	Kenya	52.95	

=== Heat 2 ===
Rank	Athlete	Nation	Time	Notes
1	Amantle Montsho	Botswana	50.15	Q
2	Francena McCorory	United States	50.19	Q
3	Libania Grenot	Italy	51.18	
4	Christine Day	Jamaica	51.19	
5	Regina George	Nigeria	51.35	
6	Alina Lohvynenko	Ukraine	51.38	
7	Aliann Pompey	Guyana	52.58	
8	Shana Cox	Great Britain	52.58	

=== Heat 3 ===
Rank	Athlete	Nation	Time	Notes
DSQ	Antonina Krivoshapka	Russia	49.81	Q
2	DeeDee Trotter	United States	49.87	Q, SB
3	Novlene Williams-Mills	Jamaica	49.91	q
4	Omolara Omotosho	Nigeria	51.41	
5	Nataliya Pyhyda	Ukraine	51.41	
6	Carol Rodríguez	Puerto Rico	52.08	
7	Lee McConnell	Great Britain	52.24	
8	Marlena Wesh	Haiti	52.49	

== Final ==
Rank	Lanes	Athlete	Nation	Time	Notes
1st place, gold medalist(s)	6	Sanya Richards-Ross	United States	49.55	
2nd place, silver medalist(s)	8	Christine Ohuruogu	Great Britain	49.70	SB
3rd place, bronze medalist(s)	4	DeeDee Trotter	United States	49.72	SB
4	7	Amantle Montsho	Botswana	49.75	
5	2	Novlene Williams-Mills	Jamaica	50.11	
6	9	Francena McCorory	United States	50.33	
7	3	Rosemarie Whyte	Jamaica	50.79	
N/A	5	Antonina Krivoshapka	Russia	~~50.17~~	DSQ
