= Brunei at the 2012 Summer Paralympics =

- IPC code: BRU

in London
- Competitors: 1 in 1 sport
- Medals: Gold 0 Silver 0 Bronze 0 Total 0

Summer Paralympics appearances (overview)
- 2012; 2016–2024

Brunei made its Paralympic Games debut at the 2012 Summer Paralympics in London, United Kingdom, from August 29 to September 9.

Brunei was represented by a single athlete, Shari Hj Juma'at, who qualified to compete in the men's javelin throw, F54-56 (wheelchair athletes). He was, in 2012, the world's highest ranking javelin thrower in his disability category, and had achieved a throw of 29.83m earlier in the year, giving the country hopes for obtaining its first Olympic or Paralympic medal.

== Athletics ==
Men’s Field Events

Athlete	Event	Final	
Athlete	Event	Distance	Rank
Shari Haji Juma'at	Javelin Throw F54-56	26.17	8

== See also ==
- Summer Paralympic disability classification
- Brunei at the Paralympics
- Brunei at the 2012 Summer Olympics
