= Brunei at the 2016 Summer Olympics =

- IOC code: BRU
- NOC: Brunei Darussalam National Olympic Council
- Website: www.bruneiolympic.org

in Rio de Janeiro
- Competitors: 3 in 2 sports
- Flag bearer: Mohamed Fakhri Ismail
- Medals: Gold 0 Silver 0 Bronze 0 Total 0

Summer Olympics appearances (overview)
- 1988; 1992; 1996; 2000; 2004; 2008; 2012; 2016; 2020; 2024; 2028

Brunei, officially known as Brunei Darussalam, competed at the 2016 Summer Olympics in Rio de Janeiro, Brazil, from 5 to 21 August 2016. This was the nation's seventh appearance at the Summer Olympics since its debut at the 1988 Summer Olympics. Brunei failed to register any athletes in two editions of the Games: 1992 in Barcelona and 2008 in Beijing.

The delegation included two sprinters, Mohamed Fakhri Ismail and Maizurah Abdul Rahim, as well as badminton player Jaspar Yu Woon Chai. Yu's appearance made him the country's first Olympic badminton player. All three athletes qualified for the game via wildcard places because they failed to meet their respective qualifying times/rankings. Fakhri was selected to carry the Bruneian flag for the opening ceremony while Maizurah held it at the closing ceremony. Following another zero medal appearance, Brunei has yet to win its first Olympic medal.

== Background ==
Although Brunei first participated in the Summer Olympics in the 1988 Summer Olympics in Seoul, South Korea, it was only represented by one official. It would not be until the 1996 Summer Olympics in Atlanta, United States that the country would send athletes to the Games. Since then, it has participated in six Summer Olympic Games between its debut and the 2016 Summer Olympics in Rio de Janeiro, Brazil. The country was the sole member of the International Olympic Committee not to participate in the 2008 Summer Olympics in Beijing; it had intended to do so, but was excluded on the day of the opening ceremony after failing to register any athletes. No Brunei athlete had ever won a medal at the Summer Olympics before the 2016 Rio Games.

The Brunei Darussalam National Olympic Committee (BDNOC) selected two athletics competitors through wildcard places. Usually, an NOC would be able to enter up to three qualified athletes in each individual event as long as each athlete met the "A" standard, or one athlete per event if they met the "B" standard. However, since Brunei had no athletes that met either standard, they were allowed to select two athletes, one of each gender, as wildcards. Brunei had intended to send another competitor, swimmer and national records holder Tiara Shahril Anwar to the Olympics, but she withdrew due to time-related reasons. The three athletes selected to compete were Mohammad Fakhri Ismail in the men's 100 metres, Maizurah Abdul Rahim in the women's 200 metres, and Jaspar Yu Woon in the men's badminton singles. Fakhri bore the flag in the parade of nations and Maizurah held it in the closing ceremony.

== Athletics ==
Brunei received universality slots from IAAF to send two athletes (one male and one female) to the Olympics. The pair of sprinters Mohamed Fakhri Ismail and Maizurah Abdul Rahim both made their Olympic debut. The former competed in the men's 100 m event while Rahim participated in the women's 200 m. Rahim finished last in her heat and in total with a time of 28.02 seconds, still managing to achieve her personal best but missing the qualification entry standards. Tori Bowie of the United States who finished first in Rahim's heat went on to win a bronze medal. Meanwhile, Ismail qualified for the next round of his event by finishing third in his heat in the preliminary round with a time of 10.92. Nevertheless, Ismail couldn't better his previous time and finished ninth in his heat with a time of 10.95, thus failing to qualify for the semifinals.

Key

- Note–Ranks given for track events are within the athlete's heat only
- Q = Qualified for the next round
- q = Qualified for the next round as a fastest loser or, in field events, by position without achieving the qualifying target
- NR = National record
- N/A = Round not applicable for the event
- Bye = Athlete not required to compete in round

Track & road events

Athlete	Event	Preliminary		Heat		Semifinal		Final	
Athlete	Event	Result	Rank	Result	Rank	Result	Rank	Result	Rank
Mohamed Fakhri Ismail	Men's 100 m	10.92	3 q	10.95	9	did not advance			
Maizurah Abdul Rahim	Women's 200 m	28.02 PB	8	—N/a		did not advance			

== Badminton ==
Brunei received an invitation from the Tripartite Commission to send a badminton player in the men's singles event, signifying the nation's Olympic debut in the sport. The Tripartite Commission is made in collaboration of the individual countries' committees, the International Olympic Committee, as well as the Badminton World Federation. Jaspar Yu Woon Chai participated in the men's singles event. Yu was seeded in group D together with Hu Yun of Hong Kong and Pablo Abián of Spain. Yu lost both sets against Hu on 12 August, the first 16–21 and the second 15–21. The following day, Yu also lost both sets against Abián. The first was 12–21 and the second 10–21. Hu went on to beat Abián on 14 August with two close sets, the former 21–18 and the latter 21–19.

Athlete	Event	Group Stage			Elimination	Quarterfinal	Semifinal	Final / BM	
Athlete	Event	Opposition Score	Opposition Score	Rank	Opposition Score	Opposition Score	Opposition Score	Opposition Score	Rank
Jaspar Yu Woon	Men's singles	Hu (HKG); L (16–21, 15–21)	Abián (ESP); L (12–21, 10–21)	3	did not advance				
