= Maizurah Abdul Rahim =

Bruneian sprinter (born 1999)

Personal information
- Born: Maizurah; 15 April 1999 (age 27) Kuala Belait, Belait, Brunei
- Education: Anthony Abell College
- Height: 1.47 m (4 ft 10 in)
- Weight: 44 kg (97 lb)

Sport
- Country: Brunei
- Sport: Athletics
- Event(s): 200 meters, 1500 meters

Achievements and titles
- Personal best(s): 200 m: 28.02 (2016); 1500 m: 02:47:82 (2018)

Maizurah binti Abdul Rahim (born 15 April 1999) is a Bruneian sprinter whom competed at the 2016 Summer Olympics in Rio de Janeiro, in the women's 200 metres. Notably, she was also the flag bearer for Brunei in the closing ceremony.

== Career ==
When Maizurah competed at the 2016 Summer Olympics, she was still a student at Anthony Abell College, Seria. Prince Sufri Bolkiah, President of the Brunei Darussalam National Olympic Council (BDNOC), gave the Olympic Pins to Fakhri Ismail, Maizurah, and Jaspar Yu Woon Chai, who are all 2016 Olympians. When she crossed the finish line in Heat 8 of the women's 200-meter race at the Rio Olympics on 15 August 2016, she fell just short of setting a new personal record. Brunei's participation in Rio was therefore put to an end. In the 200-meter race, the then 17-year-old lowered her personal best time from her previous mark of 28.26s set in the Brunei Open 2015 to 28.02s.

After finishing fourth in the girls' heptathlon competition, Maizurah missed out on a podium spot in the 2017 Philippine National Open Invitational Athletics Championships. At the Ilagan Sports Complex in Isabela, she scored a total of 2443 points to come in 16 points behind bronze medalist Rybylen Valencia. During the two-day competition at the 6th Brunei Open Track and Field Championships on 19 March of that same year, she represented Kuala Belait, winning one gold and one silver medal with a timing of 28.07s, she took first place in the women's 200m competition.

At the 2018 Brunei Darussalam National Games (SKBD) Women's 1,500-meter athletic event, Maizurah won the silver medal with a timing of 02:47:82s.
