= Fakhri Ismail =

Bruneian sprinter and footballer

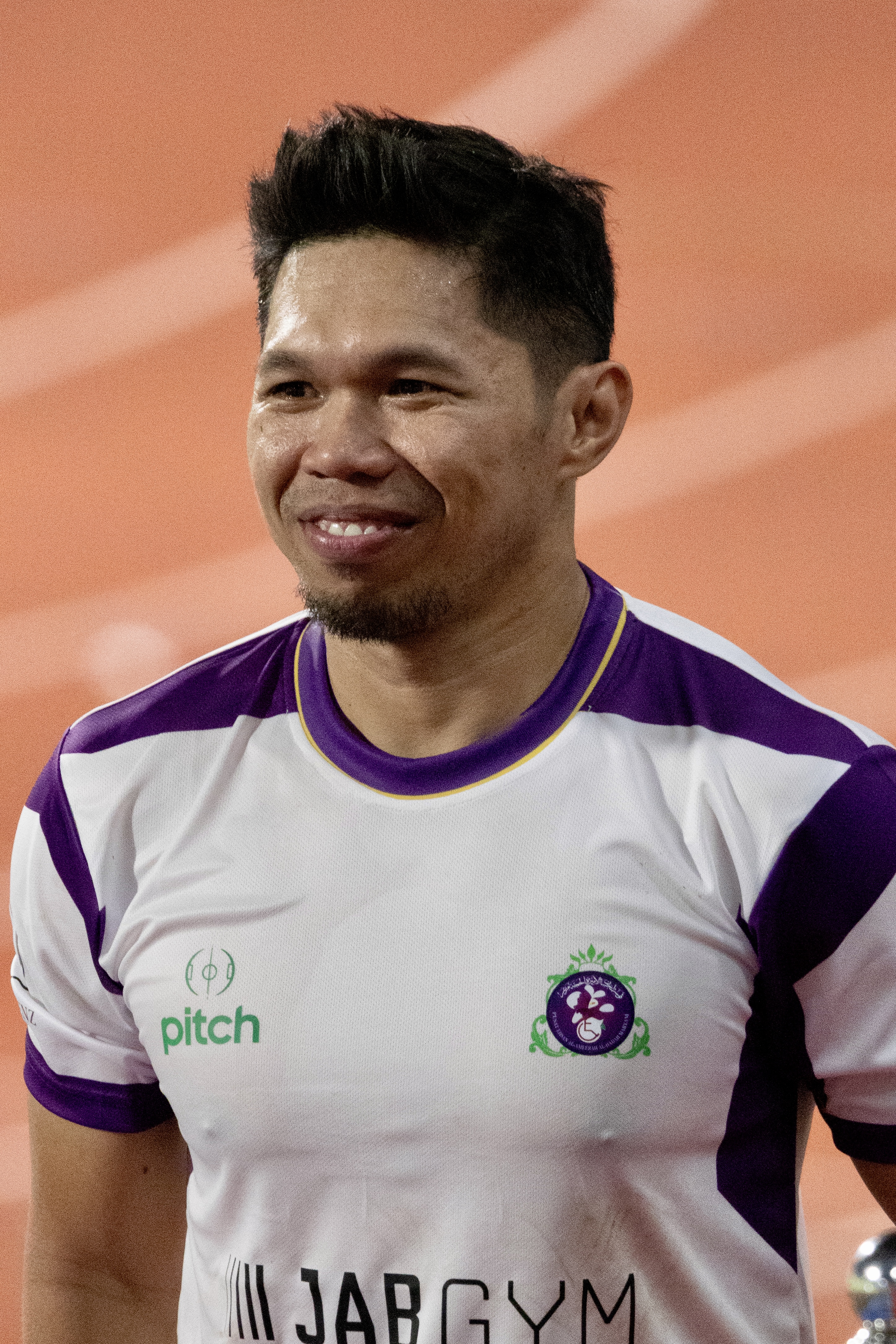
- Fakhri in 2024

Personal information
- Full name: Mohammad Fakhri bin Ismail
- Born: 6 March 1991 (age 35) Bandar Seri Begawan, Brunei
- Height: 1.70 m (5 ft 7 in)
- Weight: 72 kg (159 lb)

Sport
- Country: Brunei
- Sport: Athletics
- Event: Sprint
- Coached by: Isidro del Prado

Achievements and titles
- Personal best: 100 m: 10.59 s (2015)
- Updated on 29 August 2015

Fakhri Ismail
Personal information
- Full name: Mohammad Fakhri bin Ismail
- Date of birth: 6 March 1991 (age 35)
- Place of birth: Bandar Seri Begawan, Brunei
- Position: Striker

Senior career*
Years	Team	Apps	(Gls)
2010	DST FC		
2012	IKLS FC		
2019–2022	Indera SC		(2)
- * Club domestic league appearances and goals as of 21 June 2023

Mohammad Fakhri bin Ismail (born 6 March 1991) is a Bruneian sprinter and footballer, playing as a striker. He represented his nation Brunei in the men's 100 metres at the 2015 IAAF World Championships in Beijing, China and at the 2016 Summer Olympics in Rio de Janeiro, Brazil. Ismail also boasted a national record of 10.59 seconds, which he registered at the 2015 Southeast Asian Games in Singapore.

== Athletics career ==
At the 2016 Summer Olympics, Fakhri competed for the Bruneian team in the men's 100 metres. He posted a time of 10.92 seconds to progress further from the prelims as one of the eight fastest sprinters of the field, before rounding out the first of eight heats in ninth place with a 10.95, almost half a second shy of his personal best. He also served as Brunei's flag bearer during the parade of nations segment of the opening ceremony.

== Football career ==
Fakhri was previously a goal-getter for lesser Bruneian clubs like DST FC and IKLS FC. In the second half of the 2018–19 Brunei Super League season, Indera SC signed Fakhri to bolster their striking options, to replace departing Indonesian forward Iner Sontany Putra.

Fakhri scored his first two goals for Indera against Rimba Star FC on 28 February 2020 in a 9–0 win.

== See also ==
- Brunei at the 2015 World Championships in Athletics
- Brunei at the 2016 Summer Olympics
