= Brunei at the 1988 Summer Olympics =

- IOC code: BRU
- NOC: Brunei Darussalam National Olympic Council
- Website: www.bruneiolympic.org

in Seoul
- Competitors: 0
- Officials: 1
- Medals: Gold 0 Silver 0 Bronze 0 Total 0

Summer Olympics appearances (overview)
- 1988; 1992; 1996; 2000; 2004; 2008; 2012; 2016; 2020; 2024

Brunei participated in the Olympic Games for the first time at the 1988 Summer Olympics in Seoul, South Korea. The nation sent one official, but no athletes. It would be eight years later, at the 1996 Games, before athletes from Brunei would compete at the Olympic Games for the first time.
