= List of Royal Brunei Airlines destinations =

Royal Brunei Airlines is the flag carrier of Brunei. It was established as the state-owned national airline of the country on 18 November 1974, with the aid of British Airways and its subsidiary companies. Scheduled services began on 14 May 1975, linking Bandar Seri Begawan with Singapore using Boeing 737-200 equipment. After a year of operations, the route network consisted of Bandar Seri Begawan, Hong Kong, Kota Kinabalu, Kuching and Singapore.

As of October 2017, Royal Brunei Airlines served 18 destinations, ten of them in Southeast Asia (three in Indonesia, two in Malaysia, and a single destination in Brunei, the Philippines, Singapore, Thailand and Vietnam), three in China, one in South Korea and four more beyond Asia (Dubai, Jeddah, London and Melbourne). Following is a list of current and terminated destinations the airline serves according to its scheduled services, as of November 2018.

== List ==
Country	City	Airport	Start date	End date	Ref(s)
Australia	Brisbane	Brisbane Airport ^{Terminated}	2019 (Note: Brisbane was served between 1994 and 2011, with the service brought back in July 2019.)	2020	
Australia	Darwin	Darwin Airport ^{Terminated}	1983	2008	
Australia	Melbourne	Melbourne Airport	2011	—N/a	
Australia	Perth	Perth Airport ^{Terminated}	1991	2011	
Australia	Sydney	Sydney Airport ^{Terminated}	Unknown	2008	
Brunei	Bandar Seri Begawan	Brunei International Airport ^{Hub}	1975	—N/a	
China	Beijing	Beijing Capital International Airport ^{Terminated}	Unknown	Unknown	
China	Beijing	Beijing Daxing International Airport	1 July 2025	—N/a	
China	Changsha	Changsha Huanghua International Airport	16 April 2019	—N/a	
China	Haikou	Haikou Meilan International Airport	22 November 2018	—N/a	
China	Hangzhou	Hangzhou Xiaoshan International Airport	3 April 2018	—N/a	
China	Hong Kong	Hong Kong International Airport	1975	—N/a	
China	Nanning	Nanning Wuxu International Airport	11 April 2018	—N/a	
China	Shanghai	Shanghai Pudong International Airport	2001 (Note: Temporarily suspended between 2008 and 2010.)	—N/a	
China	Zhengzhou	Zhengzhou Xinzheng International Airport ^{Terminated}	5 July 2016	Unknown	
Germany	Frankfurt	Frankfurt Airport ^{Terminated}	1990	2007	
India	Chennai	Chennai International Airport	5 November 2024	—N/a	
India	Kolkata	Netaji Subhash Chandra Bose International Airport ^{Terminated}	Unknown	Unknown	
Indonesia	Balikpapan	Sultan Aji Muhammad Sulaiman Airport	19 February 2025	—N/a	
Indonesia	Denpasar	Ngurah Rai International Airport ^{Terminated}	July 2014	Unknown	
Indonesia	Jakarta	Halim Perdanakusuma Airport ^{Terminated}	1984	1985	
Indonesia	Jakarta	Soekarno–Hatta International Airport	1985	—N/a	
Indonesia	Surabaya	Juanda International Airport	1997	—N/a	
Japan	Osaka	Kansai International Airport ^{Terminated}	Unknown	Unknown	
Japan	Tokyo	Narita International Airport	15 March 2019	—N/a	
Kuwait	Kuwait City	Kuwait International Airport ^{Terminated}	Unknown	Unknown	
Malaysia	Kota Kinabalu	Kota Kinabalu International Airport	1975	—N/a	
Malaysia	Kuala Lumpur	Kuala Lumpur International Airport	1981	—N/a	
Malaysia	Kuching	Kuching International Airport	28 December 2018	—N/a	
Malaysia	Miri	Miri Airport ^{Terminated}	Unknown	Unknown	
Myanmar	Yangon	Yangon International Airport ^{Terminated}	Unknown	Unknown	
New Zealand	Auckland	Auckland Airport ^{Terminated}	2003	2011	
Philippines	Manila	Ninoy Aquino International Airport	1976	—N/a	
Saudi Arabia	Jeddah	King Abdulaziz International Airport	1991	—N/a	
Singapore	Singapore	Changi Airport	14 May 1975	—N/a	
South Korea	Seoul	Incheon International Airport	29 October 2017	—N/a	
Taiwan	Taipei	Taoyuan International Airport	3 December 2018	—N/a	
Thailand	Bangkok	Don Mueang International Airport ^{Terminated}	1977	2006 (Note: Except for a small number of low-cost carriers, the airport was closed in 2006 for all scheduled commercial traffic in favour of Suvarnabhumi Airport.)	
Thailand	Bangkok	Suvarnabhumi Airport	2006	—N/a	
United Arab Emirates	Abu Dhabi	Abu Dhabi International Airport ^{Terminated}	Unknown	Unknown	
United Arab Emirates	Dubai	Al Maktoum International Airport ^{Terminated}	2 May 2014	20 July 2014	
United Arab Emirates	Dubai	Dubai International Airport	1988	—N/a	
United Kingdom	London	Gatwick Airport ^{Terminated}	1990	1991	
United Kingdom	London	Heathrow Airport	1991	—N/a	
Vietnam	Ho Chi Minh City	Tan Son Nhat International Airport	17 October 2014 (Note: The destination was served prior to this date but it was suspended in 2011.)	—N/a	
