= Republic of Morac-Songhrati-Meads =

Fictional Islands Micronation in the Spratly Islands

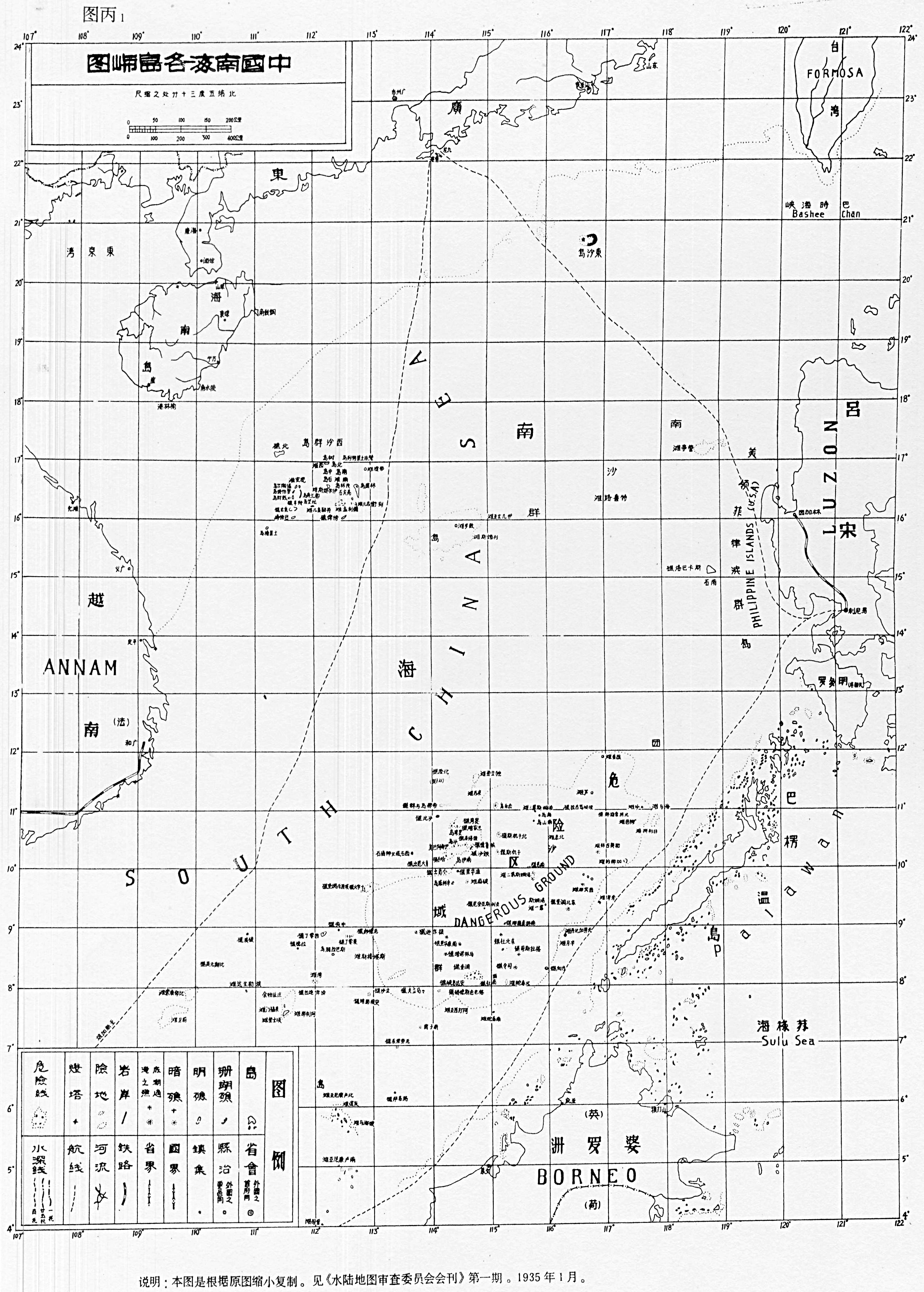
Map of the Spratly Islands from 1935.

The Republic of Morac-Songhrati-Meads and the later Kingdom of Humanity were states, retrospectively classified as micronations, that claimed the Spratly Islands. Claims about this entity date its creation to 1877, but the first verifiable evidence comes only from 1946. The then-uninhabited archipelago's nationality was already disputed by various states, and the Morac-Songhrati-Meads' claims were largely ignored throughout its existence. The republic's and kingdom's activities were practically limited to the production of materials such as postage stamps, and no settlement was ever established on the islands.

== History ==
=== Morton F. Meads ===
The image shown on one of the postage stamps issued by Morac-Songhrati-Meads from 1959, considered to be their flag.

Flag of the Kingdom of Humanity

Morton Meads was a U.S. Army Soldier, discharged in Manila in 1946, for illegally engaging in various personal business ventures, mainly in the re-sale of army surplus.

Meads' tall tales of his so-called birthright "Kingdom of Humanity" were captured in the local Philippine newspapers, which then caught the attention of the local Philippine military authorities. Meads was later arrested on criminal and civil charges for his business ventures, although these charges were later dropped. Regardless, Meads' fanciful storytelling sparked the motivation of powerful Filipino businessmen, such as Tomas Coloma, to race towards claiming the South China Sea Islands for the Philippines, such as the Spratlys.

The republic's history begins with Morton Meads' supposed British forebear, Captain James George Meads, who laid claim to the Spratly Islands in 1877. Captain Meads was exploring the South China Sea on the Modeste and laid claim to the islands and took the name King James I. Even in the 1990s, the Meads' descendants continued to posit legitimacy over the islands, and ownership of the islands' resources.

=== Kingdom of Humanity ===
A rival entity called the "Kingdom of Humanity" formed in 1914 under the leadership of Franklin M. Meads, the son of James George. The two rival factions continued their claim on the islands during World War II, when they were under the control of Japanese forces. Franklin died in 1945, and his son Josiah took over leadership; Josiah himself died soon after. His son, Morton F. Meads, was to succeed but was deemed too young.

Morton F. Meads unsuccessfully petitioned the United Nations, Republic of China, and the Philippines for recognition of the kingdom in 1972. Later that year, the remainder of the Kingdom's governing body drowned in a shipwreck off the coast of Philippines during Typhoon Ora, except for Meads. In 1985 when Meads sued the United States and others for $25 billion, claiming "unfair competition, harassment, [and] sabotage." The case was not heard.

== See also ==
- Spratly Islands
- Free Territory of Freedomland
- Cinderella stamp
