= Brunei at the Olympics =

- IOC code: BRU
- NOC: Brunei Darussalam National Olympic Council
- Website: www.bruneiolympic.org
- Medals: Gold 0 Silver 0 Bronze 0 Total 0

Summer appearances
- 1988; 1992; 1996; 2000; 2004; 2008; 2012; 2016; 2020; 2024

Brunei, as Brunei Darussalam, first participated at the Olympic Games in 1988, with a single official but no athletes. The nation returned and sent athletes to compete in the Summer Olympic Games in 1996, 2000, 2004 and 2012 onwards. On each occasion, it was represented by a single athlete. Brunei has never won an Olympic medal and hasn’t participated in the Winter Olympic Games.

In the 2008 Summer Olympics, Brunei originally planned to participate, but was expelled on the day of the opening ceremony after failing to register any athletes with the IOC.

As of 2010 Brunei was, along with Saudi Arabia and Qatar, one of only three countries never to have sent a female athlete to the Olympic Games, despite only having a total of four Olympians beforehand. The International Olympic Committee in 2010 announced it would "press" these countries to allow and facilitate women's participation. At the inaugural Youth Olympics in 2010, for which mixed teams were a requirement, Brunei's three-person delegation did include two girls (Amanda Jia Xin Liew in swimming and Maziah Mahusin in hurdling).

In March 2012, Brunei informed the IOC that it intended for Maziah Mahusin to compete in London. Although Mahusin was unlikely to meet the qualifying standards for the Games, she would be able to compete thanks to the Olympics' principle of universality, which states that "NOCs have the possibility of entering unqualified athletes in athletics and swimming should they not have athletes qualified in these sports".

The National Olympic Committee for Brunei was created in 1984 and recognized by the International Olympic Committee that same year.

== Olympic participants ==
=== Summer Olympics ===
Sport	(United States) 1996	(Australia) 2000	(Greece) 2004	(China) 2008	(United Kingdom) 2012	(Brazil) 2016	(Japan) 2020	(France) 2024	Athletes
Athletics		1	1		2	2	1	1	8
Badminton						1			1
Shooting	1	1							2
Swimming					1		1	2	4

== Medal tables ==
=== Medals by Summer Games ===
Games	Athletes	Gold	Silver	Bronze	Total	Rank
1996 Atlanta	1	0	0	0	0	–
2000 Sydney	2	0	0	0	0	–
2004 Athens	1	0	0	0	0	–
2008 Beijing	did not participate					
2012 London	3	0	0	0	0	–
2016 Rio de Janeiro	3	0	0	0	0	–
2020 Tokyo	2	0	0	0	0	–
2024 Paris	3	0	0	0	0	–
2028 Los Angeles	future event					
2032 Brisbane	future event					
Total		0	0	0	0	–

== See also ==
- List of flag bearers for Brunei at the Olympics
- Category:Olympic competitors for Brunei
