= Isidro del Prado =

Filipino sprinter

Personal information
- Born: May 15, 1959 (age 67) Barcelona, Sorsogon, Philippines
- Height: 5 ft 9 in (176 cm)
- Weight: 161 lb (73 kg)
Medal record
Men's athletics
Representing Philippines
Asian Games
Silver medal – second place	1986 Seoul	400 m
Asian Championships
Gold medal – first place	1983 Kuwait City	400 m
Gold medal – first place	1985 Jakarta	400 m
Bronze medal – third place	1983 Kuwait City	4×400 m
Bronze medal – third place	1985 Jakarta	4×400 m

Isidro del Prado (born May 15, 1959) is a two-time Filipino Olympian. He holds the 400m Philippine records in athletics. He once held the 200m record which was broken in 2007 by Ralph Waldy Soguilon, a 100m and 200m sprinter from General Santos City.

Del Prado is one of the three prominent athletes that was attributed to have been produced by the Gintong Alay sports program with the others being Lydia de Vega and Elma Muros. He won the 400m event at the 1983 and 1985 Asian Athletics Championships, as well as the 1981, 1983, 1987, and 1989 Southeast Asian Games. Along with Honesto Larce, Leopoldo Arnillo and Romeo Gido, he also competed in the 4 × 400 m relay event at the SEA Games.

In 2009, he became a coach for the Brunei national athletics team and helped Ak Hafiy Tajuddin Rositi break his own record at the men's 400 meters event at the 2012 Summer Olympics.

He is one of the new athletes to be inducted in the Hall of Fame Enshrinees in the 5th Philippine Sports.
