= Ak Hafiy Tajuddin Rositi =

Bruneian sprinter

Personal information
- Born: Awangku Hafiy Tajuddin; 4 July 1991 (age 35) Bandar Seri Begawan, Brunei
- Height: 1.83 m (6 ft 0 in)
- Weight: 64 kg (141 lb)

Sport
- Country: Brunei
- Sport: Athletics
- Events: 400 meters, 800 meters
- Coached by: Isidro del Prado (2012)

Achievements and titles
- Personal bests: 400 m: 48.67 (2012); 800 m: 2:00.58 (2011)

Awangku Hafiy Tajuddin bin Pengiran Rositi (Arabic: أك حافي تجدين روستي; born 4 July 1991) is a Bruneian runner.

== Career ==
Hafiy Taujddin was born in Bandar Seri Begawan, the fifth of ten children. The 4th Borneo Games' sixth day saw him winning gold in the men's 800 meter category with a time of 2:00.58s. He competed at the 2012 Summer Olympics in the heats round of the 400 m event with a personal best time of 48.67s.

== Doping ==
Hafiy was randomly tested and was found positive for an Adverse Analytical Finding (AAF), with the presence of a prohibited substance Anabolic Steroids (19- Narandosterone) of Exogenous origin," according to a news release issued by the Brunei Darussalam National Olympic Council (BDNOC) on 29 April 2014. Following his participation in the men's 400-meter race at the 27th Southeast Asian Games in Myanmar in December, where he placed last in his heats with a time of 49.94s, Ak Hafiy was randomly tested by the Southeast Asian Federation (SEAGF) Medical Committee. He was banned for 2 years, with the sanction ending on 24 December 2015. Prince Sufri Bolkiah, the President of the BDNOC, emphasized in a statement that athletes should abstain from doping.
