= Anderson Lim =

Bruneian swimmer (born 1995)

Anderson Lim 林志伟
Personal information
- Full name: Anderson Lim Chee Wei
- Born: 27 September 1995 (age 30) Bandar Seri Begawan, Brunei
- Height: 1.70 m (5 ft 7 in)
- Weight: 71 kg (157 lb)

Sport
- Sport: Swimming
- Strokes: Freestyle, Butterfly
- Club: Bolles Sharks

Anderson Lim
- Simplified Chinese: 林志伟
- Traditional Chinese: 林志偉
Transcriptions
Standard Mandarin
- Hanyu Pinyin: Lín Zhìwěi

Anderson Lim Chee Wei (Chinese: 林志伟; pinyin: Lín Zhìwěi; born 27 September 1995) is a Bruneian former competitive swimmer. He was the first Bruneian swimmer to compete at the Olympics, representing his country in the 2012 London Summer Olympics. Lim is also the founder of Nimanja.com, which is the first pet supply e-retailer in Brunei.

Lim's early years of education were spent at Jerudong International School in Brunei. He left for the United States in 2011 after securing an Olympic Scholarship from the Brunei Darussalam National Olympic Council. From 2011 to 2013, Lim was based in Jacksonville, Florida where he was enrolled at swimming powerhouse Bolles School.

Lim is currently studying at the University of Rochester in Upstate New York. Prior to his final year at University, Lim started Nimanja.com with the goal of "bring[ing] convenience to pet lovers in Brunei by offering a wide selection of quality pet supplies through an online platform". Today, Nimanja.com has become one of the Sultanate's largest online retailers.

== Biography ==
Anderson Lim competed at the 2012 Summer Olympics in the Men's 200-metre freestyle, finishing in 40th place in the heats and failing to qualify for the semifinals.

Lim holds five Brunei national swimming records: 200 m butterfly, 200 m freestyle, 400 m freestyle and 1500 m freestyle.

He also competed at the 2011 World Aquatics Championships in the 200 metre and 400 metre freestyle events, where he failed to advance to the semifinals.

== See also ==
- List of swimmers
- Brunei at the 2011 World Aquatics Championships
- Brunei at the 2012 Summer Olympics
