= Muhammad Isa Ahmad =

Bruneian swimmer

Muis Isa
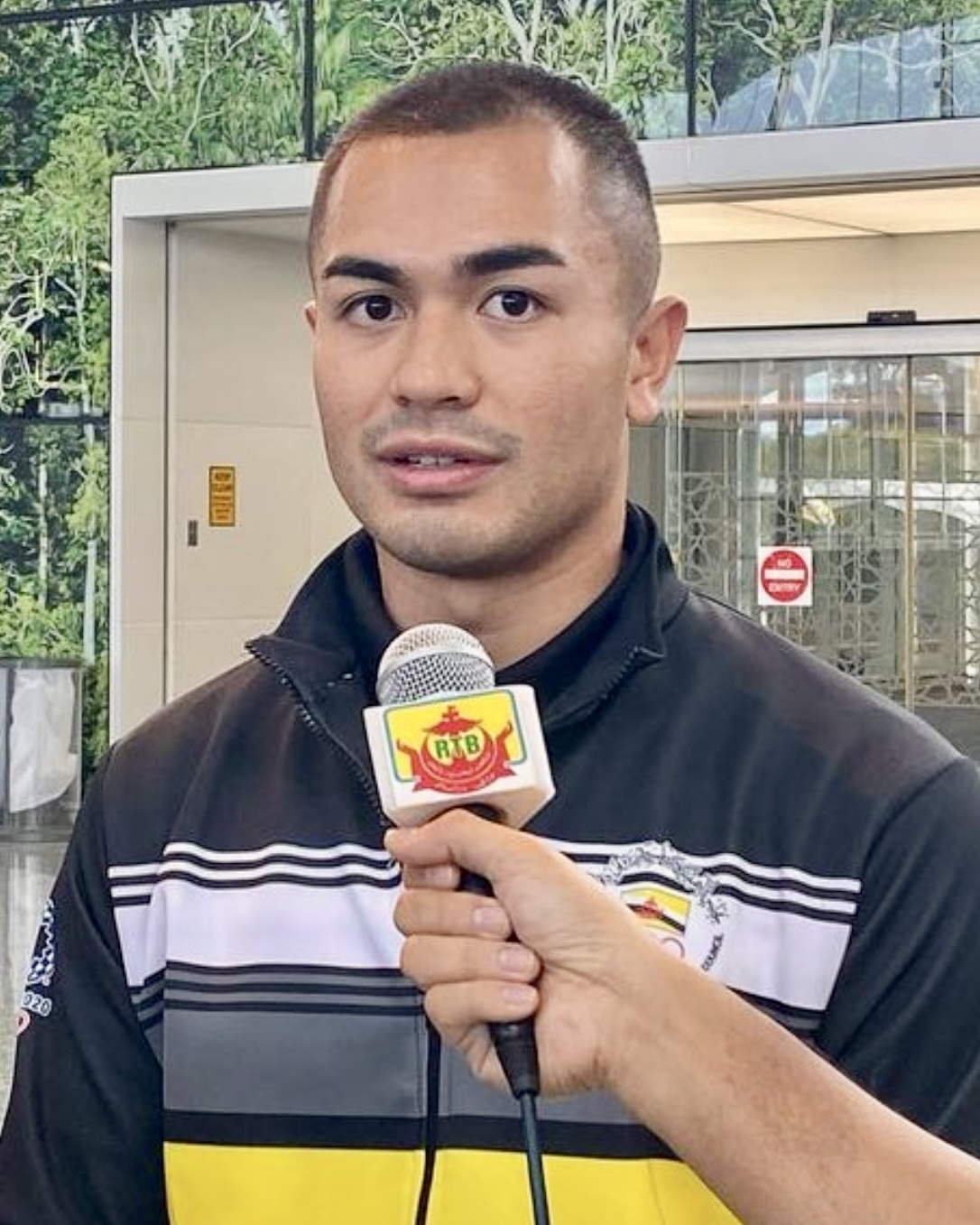
- Muis in 2021

Personal information
- Full name: Muhammad Isa Ahmad
- Nickname: Muis
- National team: Brunei
- Born: 23 February 1998 (age 28) Singapore

Sport
- Sport: Swimming
- Strokes: Breaststroke

Muhammad Isa Ahmad (born 23 February 1998), also known as Muis Isa, is a Bruneian swimmer. He grew up in Bandar Seri Begawan Brunei, spending his early school years at International School Brunei and completing his sixth form studies overseas at Millfield School. Muis is one of 7 children.

Muis competed in the 50 m and 100 m breaststroke events at the 2012 FINA World Swimming Championships (25 m) and in the 50 m and 100 m breaststroke events, the former of which he currently holds the national record with a time of 31.29 seconds, at the 2013 World Aquatics Championships. In 2019, Muis represented Brunei at the 2019 World Aquatics Championships held in Gwangju, South Korea and he competed in the men's 50 metre breaststroke and men's 100 metre breaststroke events. Muis made his debut at the Tokyo 2020 Olympics, representing Brunei, swimming the 100 m breaststroke race in 1:08.65.
