= Jimmy Anak Ahar =

Bruneian athlete

Personal information
- Born: Jimmy; 3 November 1981 (age 44)
- Height: 173 cm (5 ft 8 in)
- Weight: 65 kg (143 lb)

Sport
- Sport: Athletics
- Events: 600 meters, 1500 meters

Achievements and titles
- Personal bests: 800 m: 1:51.20 (2005); 1500 m: 3:46.4 (2005)

Jimmy Anak Ahar (born 3 November 1981) is a Bruneian athlete whom competed at the 2004 Summer Olympics.

== Career ==
In 2004, Jimmy Anak Ahar, a runner who was also unable to advance, a one-man delegation representing Brunei at the 2004 Summer Olympics, running in the 1500 metres.

At the 2005 Borneo Games, Jimmy took the gold medal for the 800 metres event.

== Personal life ==
His elder brother Sefli is also a long-distance runner while his younger brother Philip is a Bruneian international football player.

== See also ==
- List of middle-distance runners
