= Muhd Noor Firdaus Ar-Rasyid =

Bruneian sprinter

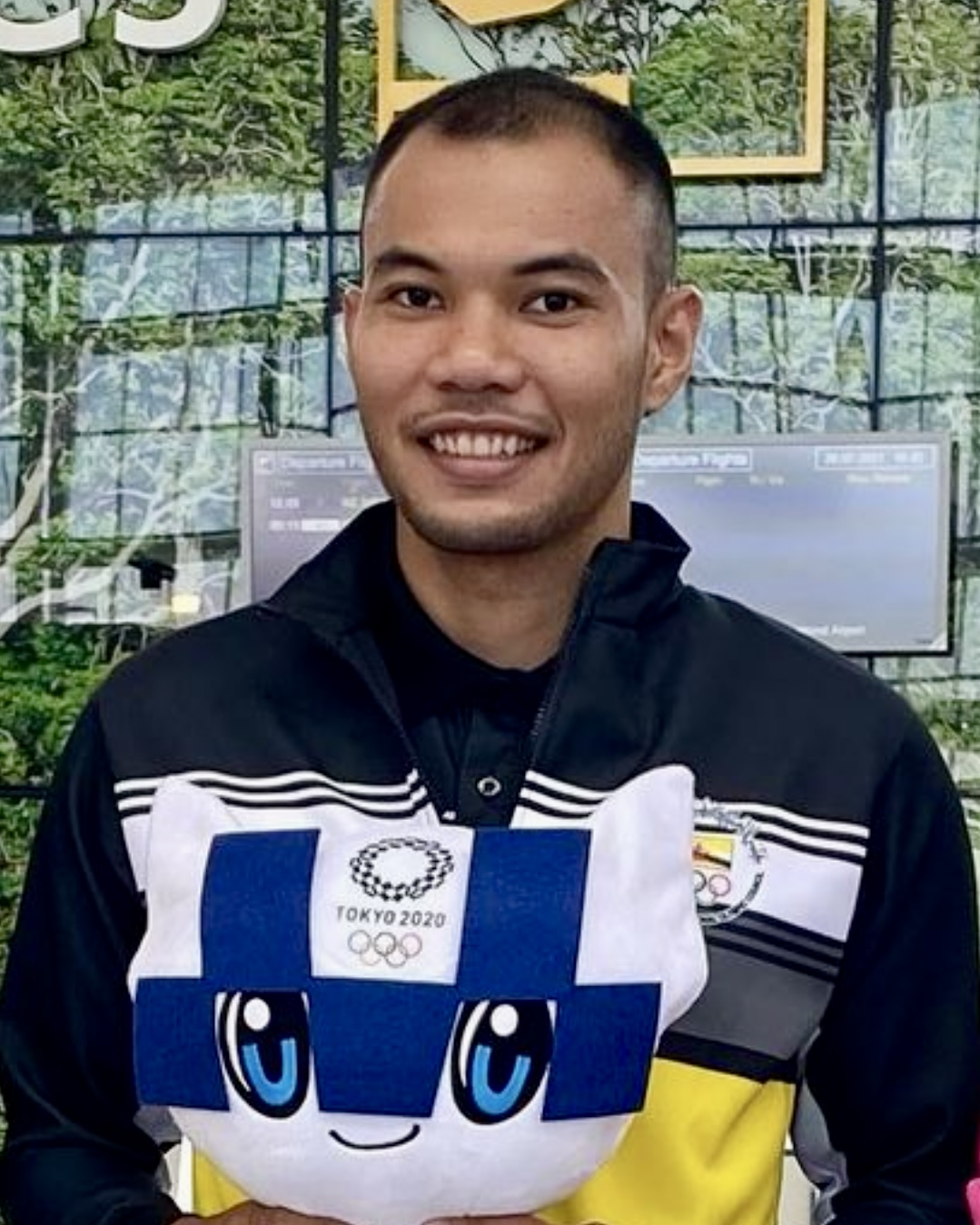
- Firdaus in 2021

Personal information
- Born: Muhammad Noor Firdaus Ar-Rasyid bin Haji Mohd Idris; 22 October 1996 (age 29)

Sport
- Country: Brunei
- Sport: Athletics
- Events: 100 meters, 200 meters
- Coached by: Isidro del Prado

Achievements and titles
- Personal bests: 100 m: 10.48 (Sabah, Malaysia 2023); 200 m: 21.39 (Kuala Lumpur 2017)

Muhammad Noor Firdaus Ar-Rasyid bin Haji Mohd Idris (born 22 October 1996) or also known as DausKhan, is a sprinter from Brunei, who specialises in the 200 metres.

== Career ==
Firdaus began competing in athletics in May 2013, at the age of 16 years old, as a representative for his school in the BDAF (Brunei Darussalam Athletics Federation) Olympic Day event. He ran in the 100-metres event, winning the gold, but finished third in the 200 meter event. October of that same year, he won gold in the 100-metres and 200-metres races at the Brunei Open (junior category). His first competition was in the Malaysia Open in Perlis in 2014, when he set a 4×100 metres relay national record that had stood for more than 15 years. From there, he moved on to join the national athletics squad.

On 9 December 2016, at the 9th BIMP-EAGA Friendship Games, he won his second gold medal in the 200m race. A day earlier, he had won gold in the 100-meter event.

Firdaus competed in 200-metres at the 2017 and 2019 World Athletics Championships, where he ran a time of 21.99 seconds. He currently holds the national record for the men's 200-metres event with a time of 21.39 s, which he achieved at the 2017 Southeast Asian Games.

He competed in the 100 metres at the 2024 Paris Olympics.
