= Maziah Mahusin =

Bruneian hurdler

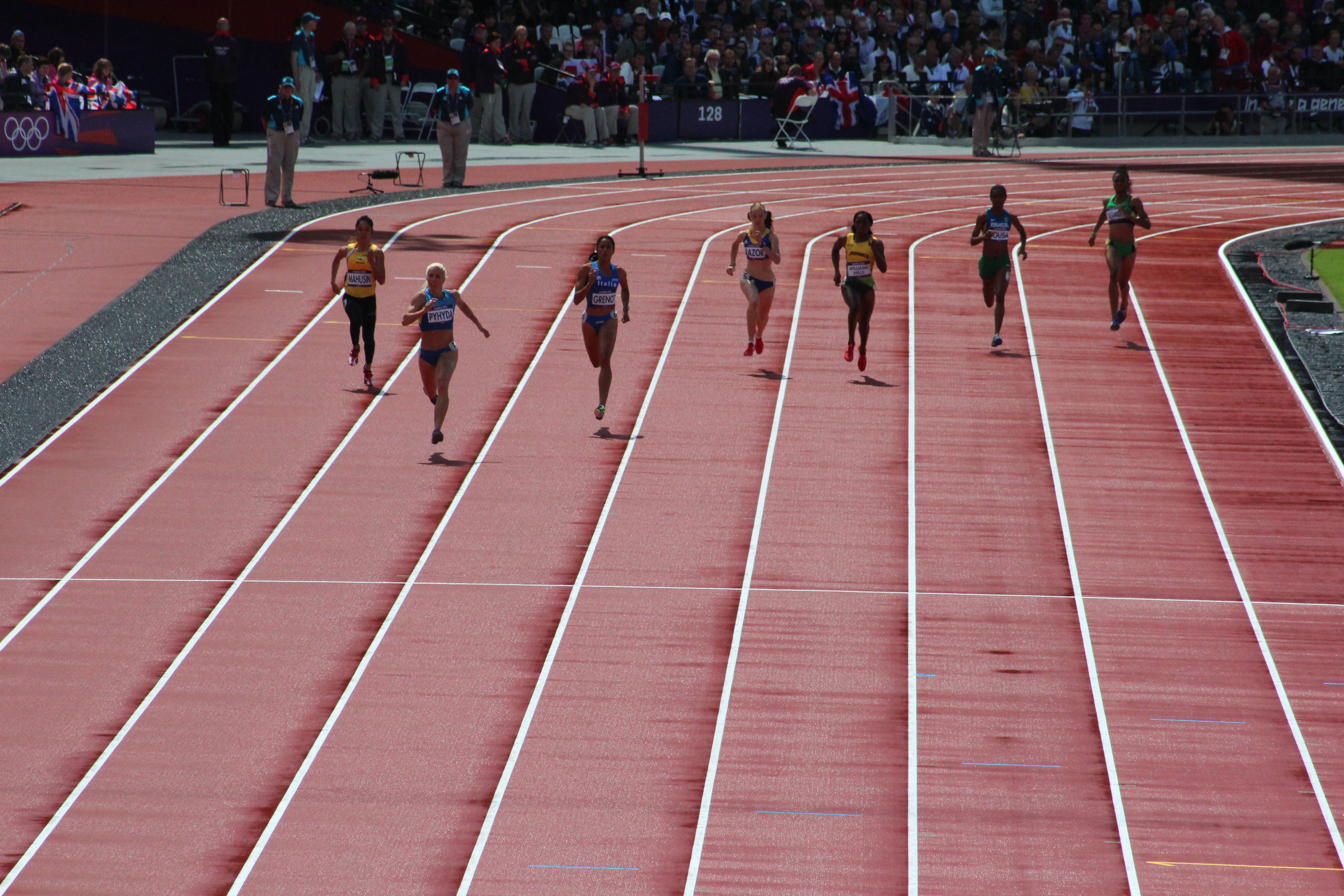
- Mariah Mahusin (leftmost) during the 2012 London Olympics

Personal information
- Nationality: Brunei
- Born: Maziah; 18 March 1993 (age 33) Bandar Seri Begawan, Brunei
- Height: 1.63 m (5 ft 4 in)
- Weight: 51 kg (112 lb; 8.0 st)
- Website: maziahmahusin.weebly.com

Sport
- Sport: Track and field
- Event: hurdler

Achievements and titles
- Personal bests: 400mH: 1:10.56 (Singapore 2010); 400m ind.: 59.28 (London 2012)

Maziah binti Mahusin (born 18 March 1993) is a Bruneian hurdler who participated in the 2010 Summer Youth Olympics and 2012 London Olympics, and became Brunei's first female Olympian. She also was selected as the country's flag-bearer for both of the events. Maziah became the face of female athletics in Brunei.

== Early life ==
Mahusin attended Micronet College but postponed her studies and, as a result, was not a full-time student. She would, however, continue them in September 2012 following the Olympics. She was a national hockey player beforehand.

== Career ==
Mahusin's career began at the 2007 Track and Field Sports Day competition in an 800-meter race, which she won. The national athletic team was present; after having observed her run, one of them approached and invited her to join their squad. She spent three months working out with the national squad before making her debut for Brunei in the Teluk Danga Games in Johor. Despite finishing second, she managed to speed up, continued to triumph in several regional and international contests, and was recognized as the nation's best female athlete in 2009 and 2011.

Mahusin competed in the 400-meter hurdles until the 2010 Youth Olympics. During preparation for the tournament, her right ankle tendon was severely wounded and never recovered. Despite being over a year has gone since the Olympics, it is still unknown whether Mahusin's performance in London had any lasting impression on Bruneian women's athletics. Mahusin came in second last overall with a time of 59.28 seconds, behind the winner Williams-Mills by nine seconds. She had broken the Bruneian national record, established a new personal best, and achieved an Olympic first.

She successfully underwent surgery to remove calcaneal spurs from her right heel on 5 July 2017. Despite using crutches and wearing a cast, the 24-year-old returned to the gym in only a fortnight. Later on 27 July, Maziah began core training, and on 30 August, she began her rehabilitation and cycling program.

She earned one gold and one silver medal during the 66th Sarawak Open Athletics Championships. She finished first in the women's 100-meter race in 13.21 seconds, 0.15 seconds faster than Nurfatieah Abdullah of Labuan. After winning her semi-final match at the Sarawak Stadium in 13.10 seconds, Maziah advanced to the final. But in their second encounter, Nurfatieah triumphed by winning the women's 200m gold. Both Maziah and Nurfatieah had identical times of 27.18 seconds. Maziah had had a time of 27.82s to win her semi-final.

== Achievements ==
Year	Competition	Venue	Position	Event	Notes
Representing Brunei
2010	Summer Youth Olympics	Bishan, Singapore	16th	400 m hurdles	1:10.56
2012	Summer Olympics	London, England	6th	400 m hurdles	59.28
2019	Sarawak Open Track and Field Championship	Kuching, Malaysia	1st	100 m hurdles	13.21
2019	Sarawak Open Track and Field Championship	Kuching, Malaysia	2nd	200 m hurdles	27.18
