= Pengiran Muda Abdul Hakeem =

Bruneian prince (born 1973)

Abdul Hakeem عبد الحكيم
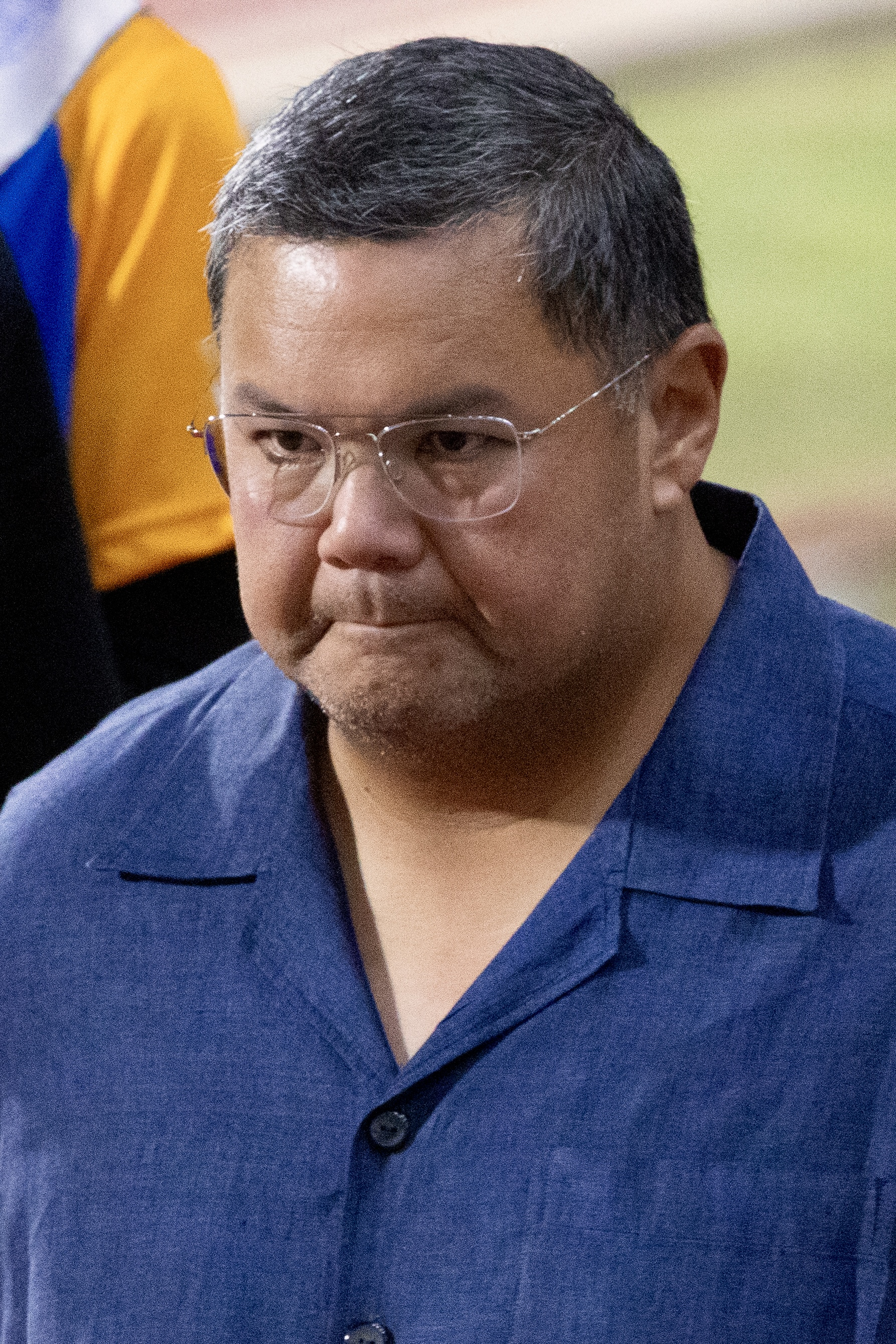
- Abdul Hakeem in 2024
- Born: 13 June 1973 (age 53); Bandar Seri Begawan, Brunei
- Issue: Pengiran Anak Abdul Halim Ar-Rahman
Names
- Abdul Hakeem ibni Jefri Bolkiah
Regnal name
- Pengiran Muda Abdul Hakeem ibni Paduka Seri Pengiran Di-Gadong Sahibul Mal Pengiran Muda Haji Jefri Bolkiah
- House: Bolkiah
- Father: Prince Jefri Bolkiah
- Mother: Pengiran Norhayati
- Occupation: Golf player and sport shooter

Abdul Hakeem ibni Jefri Bolkiah (Note: State publications still refer to him as Pengiran Muda Abdul Hakeem rather than Prince Abdul Hakeem, even though sons of the sultan and the oldest son of the Wazirs with their royal spouses are referred to as Pengiran Muda, a Bruneian aristocratic title that means "Prince" in English.) (born 13 June 1973) is a Bruneian sport shooter and a member of the royal family of Brunei.

== Early life ==
Pengiran Muda Abdul Hakeem is the eldest son of Prince Jefri Bolkiah and nephew of Hassanal Bolkiah, the current Sultan of Brunei. He has a younger brother and sister, Prince Bahar (born 20 August 1981) and Pengiran Anak Hamidah Jamalul Bulqiah (born 26 April 1977). After education at Emanuel School in London.

His father appointed him and Bahar as directors of the New York Palace before to the couple's departure for Brunei. The large, hefty princes are the real heirs to Jefri's lavish lifestyle, claim Jefri's lawyers Faith Zaman and Thomas Derbyshire. At one of Hakeem's birthdays, Rod Stewart gave a performance. At a cost of seven figures apiece, his father brought in NFL players Joe Montana and Herschel Walker to Brunei to instruct him in the game when he expressed a desire to learn football. No one was permitted to tackle him, so when Hakeem couldn't catch the ball, a teammate would pass it to him, and he would slide down the field for an easy score. According to one of Zaman's statements, his father gave him $1 billion as a birthday present when he turned 18.

== Business career ==
- Managing Director of the Amedeo Development Corporation until 1998.
- Managing Director of the Datastream Technology.
- Chairman of The Lexicon Group Limited (Singapore) since 2010.
- Director of Amedeo Holdings Inc.
- Director of PH Partners Inc.
- Director of Palace Holdings Inc.
- Director of Kava Holdings Inc.
- Cedar Swamp Holdings Inc.
- President of the Brunei Bullets Football Club 1995.
- Represented Brunei at the Olympic Games in Sydney 2000 and Athens 2004 in shooting (skeet).
- Vice-president of the Brunei Amateur Football Association since 2001.

== Sports career ==
Among the record 761 players who will participate in the 2013 Asian Tour qualifying school in Thailand is Hakeem, becoming the first golfer from Brunei to compete on the tour. He began playing golf after seeing his grandfather, Sultan Omar Ali Saifuddien III, play, and he didn't turn professional until he achieved a zero handicap in 2012.

Hakeem competed in the men's skeet shooting events at the 1996 and 2000 Summer Olympics. In the 1996 event, he tied for 49th place, while in the 2000 event, he placed 45th; he failed to qualify for the finals in either year.

== Controversies ==
On 8 September 2012 it was reported that the prince was being sued by 9 investors because of a disagreement over the transfer of some 80 million shares in the Singapore-listed Elektromotive Group to those shareholders. It was reported that among those who were suing was Citi's Chief Singapore and Malaysia Economist, Kit Wei Zheng, Ms Eileen Ong and Mr Chan Kwai Sum. Eventually the Prince agreed to pay the full amount demanded by the investors of S$890,000 as well as legal costing amounting to $50,000. The prince suggested that he had been used as a "figurehead" to gain the trust of investors. However, Elektromotive Group was struggling financially.

== Marriage ==
The 18 January 2024, he was married had issue one son.

== Honours ==
=== National ===
- Excellent Service Medal (PIKB; 2 March 2017)
- Proclamation of Independence Medal (1 January 1984)
- Sultan of Brunei Golden Jubilee Medal (5 October 2017)
- Sultan of Brunei Jubilee Medal (5 October 1992)
- National Day Silver Jubilee Medal (23 February 2009)

=== International ===
- Silver Olympic Order, 1999. (IOC)

== See also ==
- List of royal Olympians

== Notes ==
Pengiran Muda Abdul Hakeem House of Bolkiah Born: 13 June 1973
Preceded by Prince Jefri	Line of succession to the throne of Bruneian; 19th position	Succeeded by Prince Abdul Halim Ar-Rahman
