= Brunei Darussalam National Olympic Council =

National Olympic Committee

- Country: Brunei
- [[|]]
- Code: BRU
- Created: 1984
- Recognized: 1984
- Continental Association: OCA
- President: Prince Sufri Bolkiah
- Secretary General: Zuraimi Abdul Sani
- Website: bruneiolympic.org

The Brunei Darussalam National Olympic Council (Malay: Majlis Olimpik Kebangsaan Brunei Darussalam, Jawi: مجليس اوليمڤيك كبڠسأن بروني دارالسلام, IOC code: BRU) is the National Olympic Committee representing Brunei. It is also the body responsible for Brunei's representation at the Commonwealth Games and the governing body of sports in the country.

== History ==
The Brunei Sports Council, established in 1975 and dissolved in 1987, aimed to unite and coordinate the National Sports Associations. Its role was taken over by the Brunei Darussalam National Olympic Council, which was established in 1984. This council is a member of the International Olympic Committee and represents the country in events and championships organised or endorsed by it. In 2024, about 32 sports have National Sports Associations, and more than 150 sports and youth organisations and clubs conduct sporting activities.

== See also ==
- Brunei at the Olympics
- Brunei at the Commonwealth Games
