= Princess Muneerah Madhul Bolkiah =

Bruneian princess (born 2011)

Muneerah Madhul Bolkiah منيرة مدح البلقية
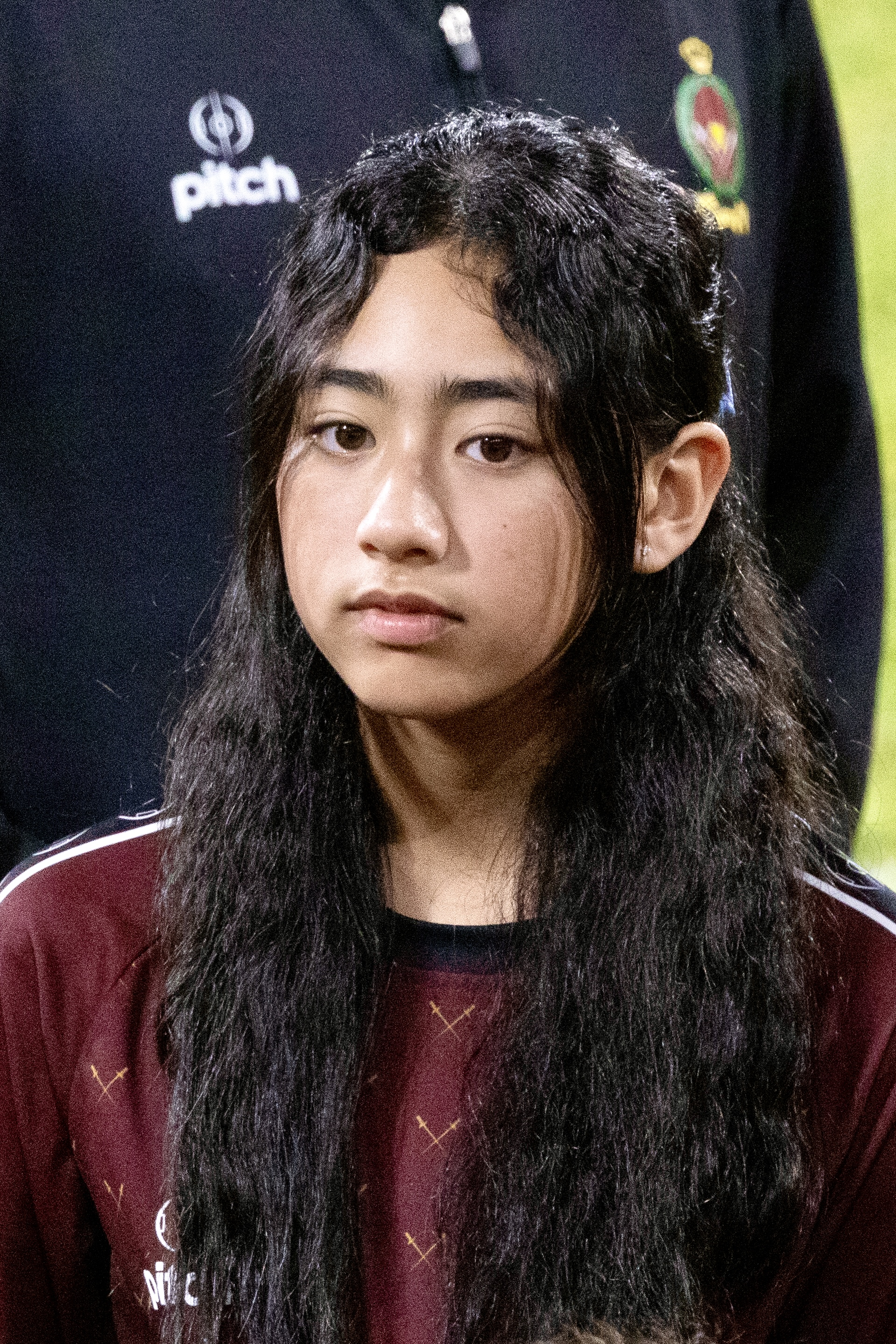
- Princess Muneerah in 2024
- Born: Muneerah Madhul Bolkiah binti Al-Muhtadee Billah; 2 January 2011 (age 15); Istana Nurul Iman, Bandar Seri Begawan, Brunei
- House: Bolkiah
- Father: Al-Muhtadee Billah
- Mother: Sarah binti Salleh
- Religion: Sunni Islam

Muneerah Madhul Bolkiah binti Al-Muhtadee Billah (Jawi: منيرة مدح البلقية; born 2 January 2011) is a member of the royal family of Brunei. She is the eldest daughter of Crown Prince Al-Muhtadee Billah and Crown Princess Sarah and a granddaughter of Sultan Hassanal Bolkiah of Brunei.

== Early life ==
Princess Muneerah was born on 2 January 2011 to Crown Prince Al-Muhtadee Billah and Crown Princess Sarah, at the Istana Nurul Iman in Bandar Seri Begawan, Brunei. She has three siblings: Prince Muntaqim, Prince Aiman, and Princess Faathimah.

== Education ==
Princess Muneerah is currently studying at International School Brunei in Bandar Seri Begawan. While at school, she has participated in plays and piano recitals.

On 21 June 2024, Muneerah took part in a Khatam Al-Quran Ceremony with other students from ISB marking the completion of their recitation of the Quran.

Muneerah plays several sports including basketball, football, and swimming. In March 2024, she along with other students from ISB competed at the Federation of British International Schools in Asia Games in Si Racha, Thailand. In November 2025, she again took part in the FOBISIA Games this time in Brunei. She competed on ISB's athletics, basketball, and football teams and won the overall Girls MVP award. That same month, she took part in the 200 metres race during the ASEAN School Games at Hassanal Bolkiah National Stadium in Brunei.

== Royal duties ==
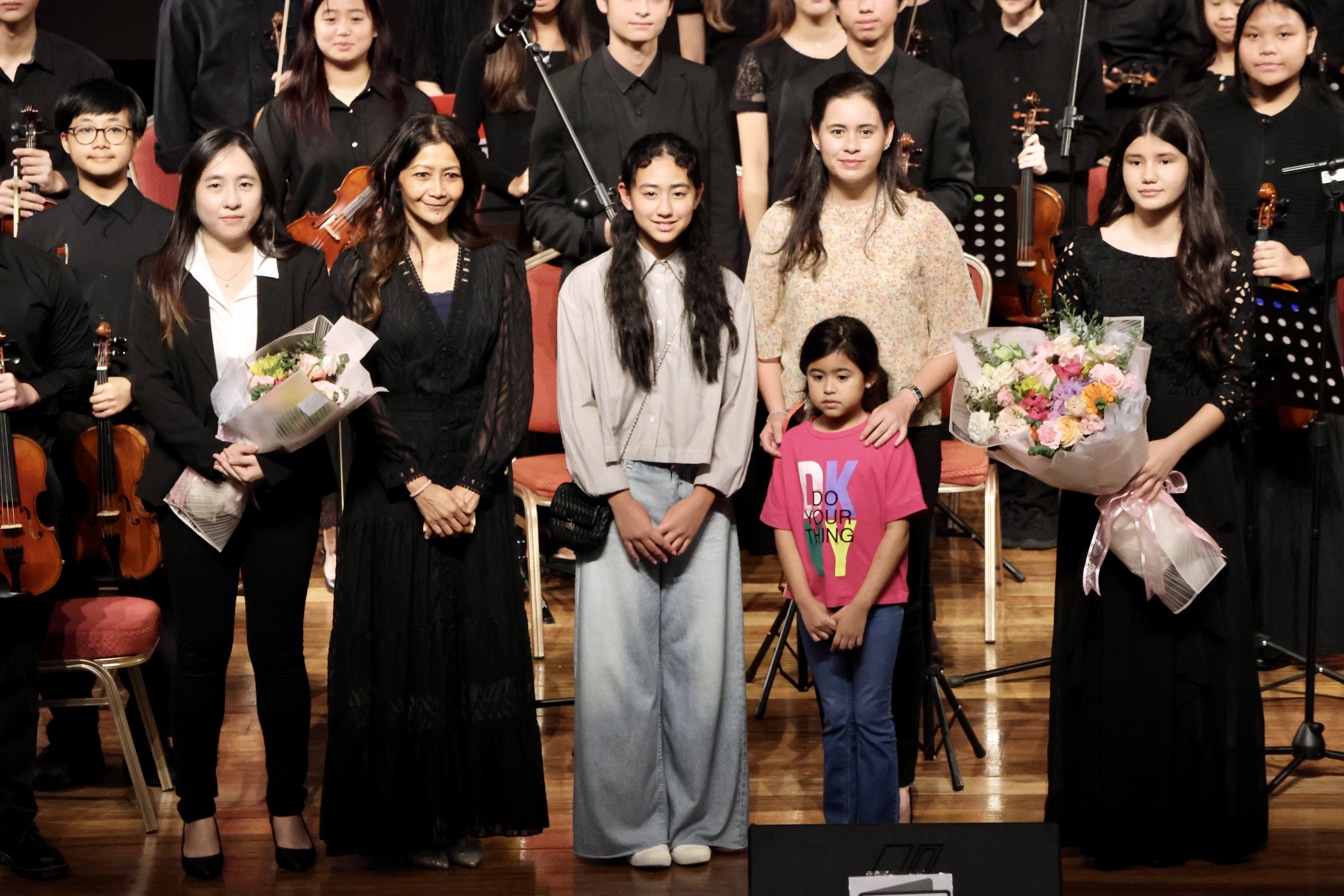
Muneerah with her mother and sister at the Brunei Youth Symphony in November 2024

Princess Muneerah often accompanies her parents on official trips abroad. She has participated during visits to Japan, Malaysia, and Singapore.

Along with her family, Muneerah attends Chinese New Year open houses of prominent Chinese Bruneians.

In June 2022, Muneerah gifted a painting she had created to EVYD Technology to mark the opening of their campus in Jerudong and to thank them for the help in creating BruHealth with the Ministry of Health. In July 2023, she attended the banquet at Istana Nurul Iman celebrating her grandfather, the Sultan's, 77th birthday.

In June 2025, Muneerah participated in several events for Ocean Week Brunei. First she attended the reef ball fabricator workshop to create artificial reefs that will be placed off Brunei's coastline. Later she was part of a dive team along with her mother, Crown Princess Sarah, to plant coral on the reef balls at Pelumpong Island. The event broke the record for the most coral planted in a single day in Brunei.

== Title and style ==
Styles of Princess Muneerah
- Reference style: Yang Teramat Mulia
- Alternative style: Her Royal Highness

Her full title and style is Yang Teramat Mulia Pengiran Anak Muneerah Madhul Bolkiah binti Duli Yang Teramat Mulia Paduka Seri Pengiran Muda Mahkota Pengiran Muda Haji Al-Muhtadee Billah It is usually translated in English as Her Royal Highness Princess Muneerah of Brunei.

=== Honours ===
- Sultan of Brunei Golden Jubilee Medal (5 October 2017)
