= Prince Abdul Muntaqim of Brunei =

Bruneian prince (born 2007)

Abdul Muntaqim عبد المنتقم
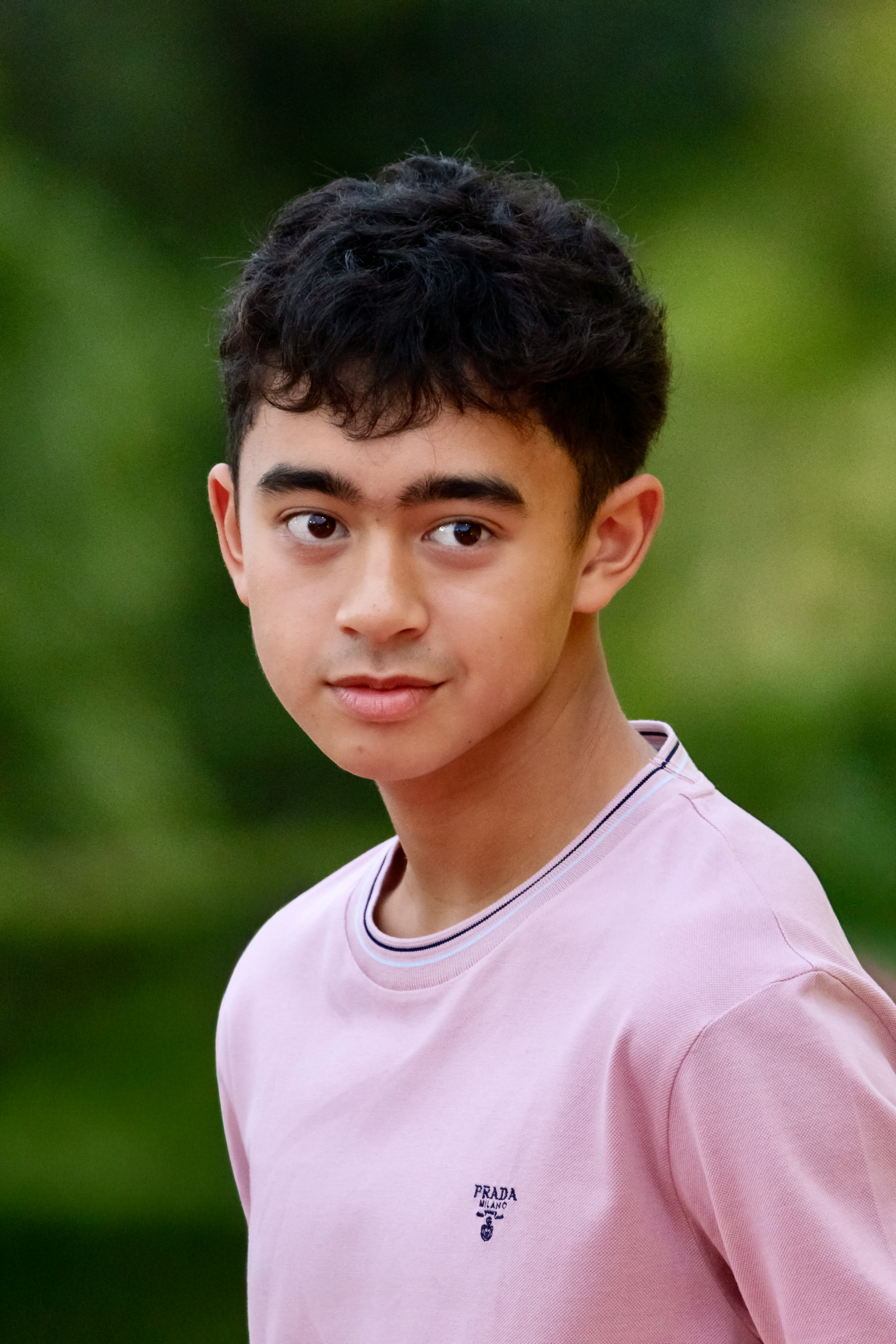
- Prince Muntaqim in 2024
- Born: Abdul Muntaqim ibni Al-Muhtadee Billah; 17 March 2007 (age 19); Raja Isteri Pengiran Anak Saleha Hospital, Bandar Seri Begawan, Brunei
- House: Bolkiah
- Father: Al-Muhtadee Billah
- Mother: Sarah binti Salleh
- Religion: Sunni Islam
Association football career
- Position: Midfielder
Team information
- Current team: DPMM FC II
- Number: 17
Youth career
- 2021–2026: DPMM
Senior career*
Years	Team	Apps	(Gls)
2024–2025	DPMM II	12	(3)
2026–	DPMM II	0	(0)
International career^{‡}
2022	Brunei U17	3	(0)
2024	Brunei U19	3	(0)
- * Club domestic league appearances and goals as of 13 September 2026 ‡ National team caps and goals as of 25 November 2024

Abdul Muntaqim ibni Al-Muhtadee Billah (Jawi: عبد المنتقم; born 17 March 2007) is a member of the royal family of Brunei. He is the eldest child of Crown Prince Al-Muhtadee Billah and Crown Princess Sarah and grandson of Sultan Hassanal Bolkiah of Brunei. Prince Muntaqim is second in the line of succession to the Bruneian throne after his father.

== Early life ==
Prince Muntaqim was born on 17 March 2007 to Crown Prince Al-Muhtadee Billah and Crown Princess Sarah, at the Raja Isteri Pengiran Anak Saleha Hospital in Bandar Seri Begawan. He has three younger siblings: Princess Muneerah, Prince Aiman, and Princess Faathimah.

== Education ==
In May 2025, Muntaqim graduated from the International Baccalaureate Diploma Programme at International School Brunei in Bandar Seri Begawan. His subjects were Sports, Exercise and Health Science, Economics, Geography, and Malay and he received the Bronze Excellence and Achievement Award for his performance on the IB exams.

While in school, Muntaqim played several sports including badminton, basketball, and swimming. In May 2017, he along with other students from ISB competed at the Federation of British International Schools in Asia Games in Pattaya, Thailand. In May 2018, Muntaqim competed in eleven events and earned nine medals at the FOBISIA Games in Phuket. In February 2019, he was part of the ISB team sent to the FOBISIA Games again held in Phuket.

== Football ==
Prince Muntaqim has played association football from a young age. In 2021, he began playing for the football club owned by his father, Duli Pengiran Muda Mahkota Football Club's, U-15 youth team. The following year, he captained the Brunei national U-17 football team during the 2022 AFF U-16 Championship in Indonesia.

In 2023, Muntaqim played for DPMM FC's U-20 youth team. They won the Football Association of Brunei Darussalam's Under-20 Youth League Championship. In July 2024, he was selected for the Brunei national under-19 football team playing at the 2024 ASEAN U-19 Boys Championship.

Prince Muntaqim played for DPMM FC's second team in the 2024–25 Brunei Super League. He made his league debut against MS ABDB on 1 September 2024 in a 2–1 win and he scored his first two career goals in a 7–0 win against Wijaya FC on 24 November of that year. In May 2025, DPMM II with Prince Muntaqim won the 2025 Brunei FA Cup by beating Indera SC 1–0 in the final.

Prince Muntaqim featured for the youth team of DPMM at the 2025–26 Brunei Youth League Under-18, and became champions of the league on 30 January 2026 through a superior goal difference to Kasuka FC's under-18 side.

== Royal duties ==
Prince Muntaqim often accompanies his parents on official trips abroad. He has participated during visits to Oman, Singapore, and Japan.

Along with his family, Muntaqim attends Chinese New Year open houses of prominent Chinese Bruneians. In July 2023, he attended the banquet at Istana Nurul Iman celebrating his grandfather, the Sultan's, 77th birthday.

== Titles, styles, and honours ==
Styles of Prince Abdul Muntaqim
- Reference style: Yang Teramat Mulia
- Alternative style: His Royal Highness

=== Title and style ===
His full title and style is Yang Teramat Mulia Pengiran Muda ‘Abdul Muntaqim ibni Duli Yang Teramat Mulia Paduka Seri Pengiran Muda Mahkota Pengiran Muda Al-Muhtadee Billah It is usually translated in English as His Royal Highness Prince Muntaqim of Brunei.

=== Honours ===
- Sultan of Brunei Golden Jubilee Medal (5 October 2017)
- National Day Silver Jubilee Medal (23 February 2009)

Prince Abdul Muntaqim of Brunei House of Bolkiah Born: 17 March 2007
Preceded by Al-Muhtadee Billah	Succession to the Bruneian throne 2nd position	Succeeded by Muhammad Aiman
