= Hassanal Bolkiah =

Sultan of Brunei since 1967

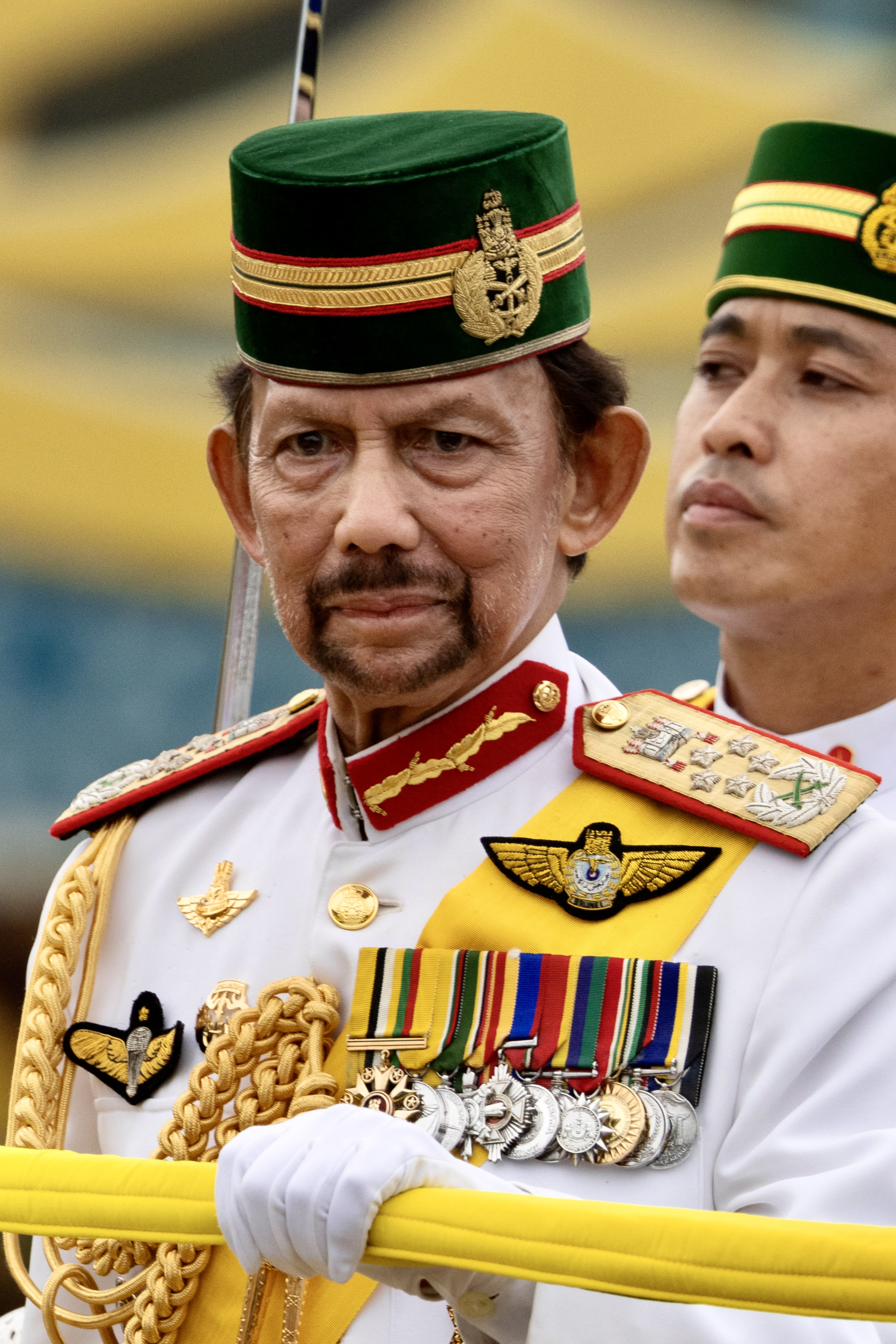
- Bolkiah in 2024

Sultan of Brunei
- Reign: 5 October 1967 – present
- Coronation: 1 August 1968
- Predecessor: Omar Ali Saifuddien III
- Heir apparent: Al-Muhtadee Billah

Prime Minister of Brunei
- Incumbent
- Assumed office 1 January 1984
- Deputy: Al-Muhtadee Billah
- Preceded by: Office established

Minister of Defence Commander-in-Chief of the Royal Brunei Armed Forces
- Incumbent
- Assumed office 7 September 1986 Serving with Halbi Mohd Yussof (2018–2022; 2023–)
- Preceded by: Omar Ali Saifuddien III

Minister of Finance
- Incumbent
- Assumed office 23 February 1997 Serving with Abdul Rahman Ibrahim (2005–2018) and Amin Liew Abdullah (2018–)
- Preceded by: Jefri Bolkiah
- In office 1 January 1984 – 20 October 1986
- Preceded by: Office established
- Succeeded by: Jefri Bolkiah

Minister of Home Affairs
- In office 1 January 1984 – 20 October 1986
- Preceded by: Office established
- Succeeded by: Isa Ibrahim

Minister of Foreign Affairs
- In office 22 October 2015 – 4 June 2026 Serving with Lim Jock Seng (2005–2018) and Erywan Yusof (2018–2026)
- Preceded by: Mohamed Bolkiah
- Succeeded by: Abdul Mateen
- Born: Hassanal Bolkiah Muiz'zaddin Wad'daulah; 15 July 1946 (age 80); Istana Darussalam, Brunei Town, Brunei
- Spouse: Pengiran Anak Saleha (m. 1965) Mariam Abdul Aziz (m. 1981; div. 2003) Azrinaz Mazhar Hakim (m. 2005; div. 2010)
- Issue: List: Princess Rashidah; Princess Muta-Wakkilah; Crown Prince Al-Muhtadee Billah; Princess Majeedah; Princess Hafizah; Prince Abdul Azim; Prince Abdul Malik; Princess Azemah; Princess Fadzilah; Prince Abdul Mateen; Prince Abdul Wakeel; Princess Ameerah
Names
- Sultan Haji Hassanal Bolkiah Mu'izzaddin Waddaulah ibni Al-Marhum Sultan Haji Omar 'Ali Saifuddien Sa'adul Khairi Waddien
- House: Bolkiah
- Father: Omar Ali Saifuddien III
- Mother: Pengiran Anak Damit
- Religion: Sunni Islam
- Education: Sultan Omar Ali Saifuddien College; Royal Military Academy Sandhurst

Hassanal Bolkiah Muiz'zaddin Wad'daulah (Note: Jawi: حسن البلقیة معز الدین والدولة; lit. 'Hassan al-Bolkiah, glorifier of religion and state'; Malay pronunciation: [hasˈsanal ˈbolkjah mwizˈzaddin waddaˈulah]) (born 15 July 1946) has reigned as the sultan of Brunei since 1967, and has also served as the prime minister of Brunei since its independence from British rule in 1984. He is among the world's few remaining absolute monarchs.

The eldest son of Sultan Omar Ali Saifuddien III and Raja Isteri Pengiran Anak Damit, he is the 29th sultan to ascend to the Bruneian throne, following the abdication of his father in 1967. The Sultan has been ranked among the wealthiest individuals in the world. Currently, as of 2026, Hassanal Bolkiah is said to have a net worth of $50 billion. He is the world's longest-reigning current monarch and the longest-serving current head of state. On 5 October 2017, Bolkiah celebrated his Golden Jubilee to mark the 50th year of his reign.

== Early life and education ==
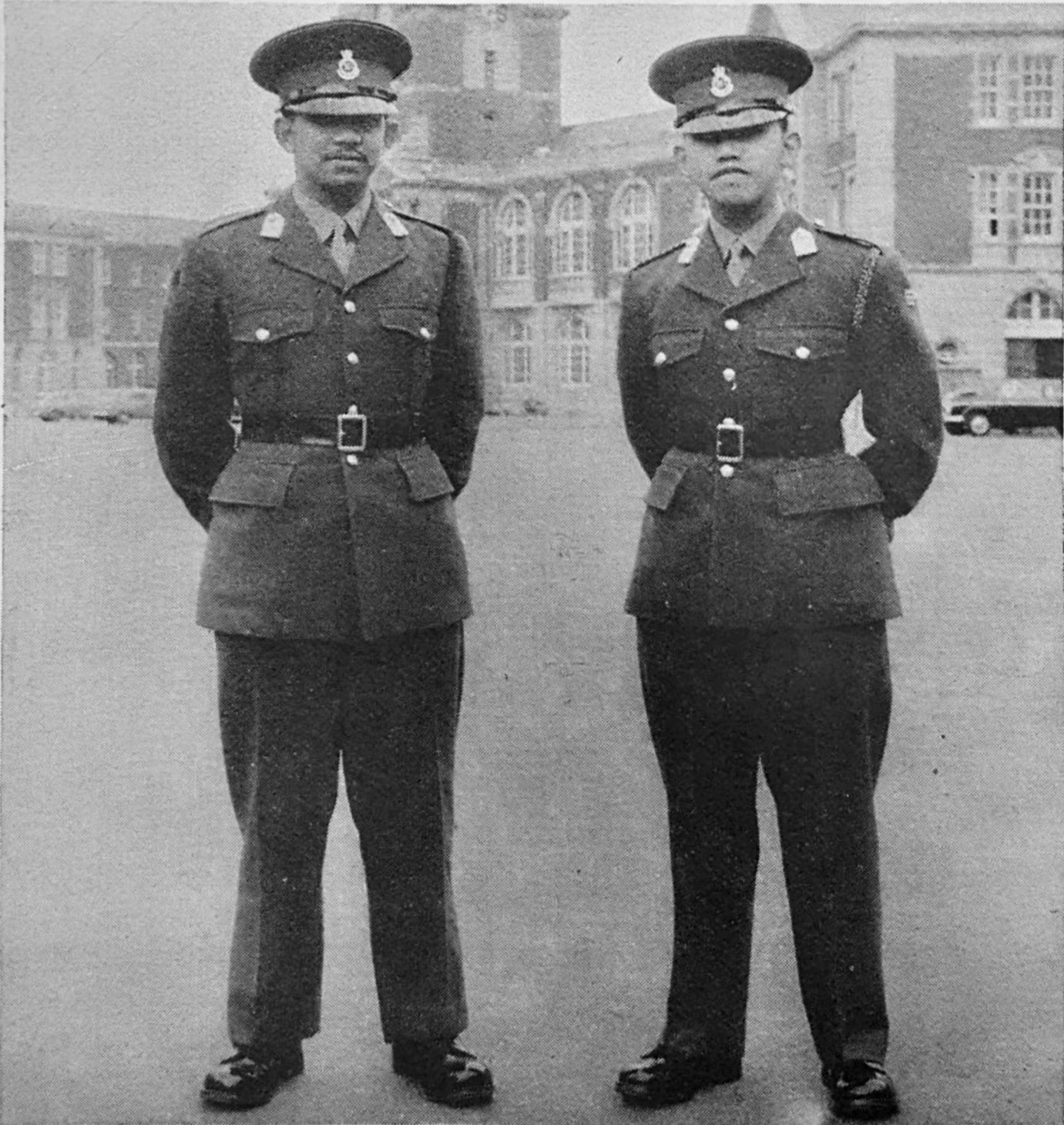
Princes Hassanal Bolkiah and Mohamed Bolkiah at the Royal Military Academy Sandhurst in 1966

Pengiran Muda (Prince) Hassanal Bolkiah was born during the reign of his uncle Sultan Ahmad Tajuddin on 15 July 1946, in Istana Darussalam. His father, the Pengiran Bendahara Seri Maharaja Permaisuara at that time, was the heir presumptive of Brunei which put him second in line to the throne at the time of his birth. Prince Mohamed Bolkiah, Prince Sufri Bolkiah, and Prince Jefri Bolkiah are his three brothers, while Princess Masna, Princess Nor'ain, Princess Umi Kalthum Al-Islam, Princess Amal Rakiah, Princess Amal Nasibah, and Princess Amal Jefriah are his six sisters.

His education at the Istana Darul Hana Surau began in the latter part of 1955 and finished in the first week of 1959. Abdul Ghani bin Jamil revealed in an interview that in addition to Hassanal Bolkiah, among the students at the surau were Prince Mohamed Bolkiah, Princess Masna Bolkiah, Princess Nor'ain, Pengiran Anak Saleha, Pengiran Muda Abdul Rahman, Pengiran Anak Yusof, Pengiran Anak Puteh, Pengiran Anak Ja'afar, and Pengiran Muda Apong. They range in age from five to ten years old, with Abdul Ghani stating that Hassanal Bolkiah is the oldest by far.

Hassanal Bolkiah finished his third grade schooling at the Jamalul Alam Malay School in Brunei Town in 1955 when he was nine years old. Abdul Rahman bin Haii Mohd. Ja'afar was the teacher assigned to him and the prince only received instruction from Abdul Rahman for three to four months, following which he ceased receiving "Private Tuition" for a month at the surau. He was able to read English literature in three months, and after four years, he had reached the sixth grade of primary schooling. He prefers to study the sciences, languages, and history from a subject standpoint.

For over four years, Hassanal Bolkiah attended school at the Istana Darul Hana Surau before relocating to Kuala Lumpur to further his education. He originally attended Jalan Gurney School before studying at Victoria Institution from January 1961 to December 1963. As a result, he became the first Sultan of Brunei to complete his education both domestically and abroad. According to V. Murugasu, the headmaster of Victoria Institution, he has demonstrated qualities of a great and responsible leader since he was a student. While at Victoria Institution, he enlisted in the Cadet Corps and was named best recruit in 1961. He wasn't the only royal or nobleman at the institution, according to G. E. D. Lewis, the school principal, thus the prize was given solely on the basis of merit. He had attained the rank of Lance Corporal when he left the institution.

At the age of fifteen, he was crowned as Yang Maha Mulia Seri Paduka Duli Pengiran Muda Mahkota (His Royal Highness the Crown Prince) on 14 July 1961. Notably, the 2nd Gurkha Rifles were dispatched to Brunei in December 1962, the month the Brunei revolt began. Lieutenant Colonel Digby Willoughby and a small Royal Gurkha Rifles squad helped to rescue his father and him from their palace, and his father was eternally grateful for Willoughby's actions on that day.

Due to the strained relations between Brunei and Malaysia in 1963, Hassanal Bolkiah went back to Brunei to complete his education at an English school, Sultan Omar Ali Saifuddien College. The wedding between Pengiran Anak Saleha and Hassanal Bolkiah took place in the palace on 29 July 1965. He later enrolled as a cadet officer at the Royal Military Academy Sandhurst (RMAS) on 4 January 1966. On 16 August, he praised the launch of two ships by Sharikat Limbongan Kapal Takehara Berhad, highlighting the Japanese company's investment as beneficial for Brunei and stressing the importance of pursuing domestic enterprises over relying on specific income sources.

He and his wife bade farewell to state dignitaries early on 7 September 1966, and departed Brunei Airport for England. He pursued studies in English, mathematics, science, military science and international affairs, with a focus on the country of Russia, throughout his time at the RMAS. He gave particular emphasis to the study of the significance of technical and strategic development. The two most crucial skills for his future, self-discipline and responsibility, were the focus of his training at the RMAS. He graduated and was commissioned as an Honorary Captain in the Coldstream Guards on 1 March 1968.

== Reign ==
=== Accession ===
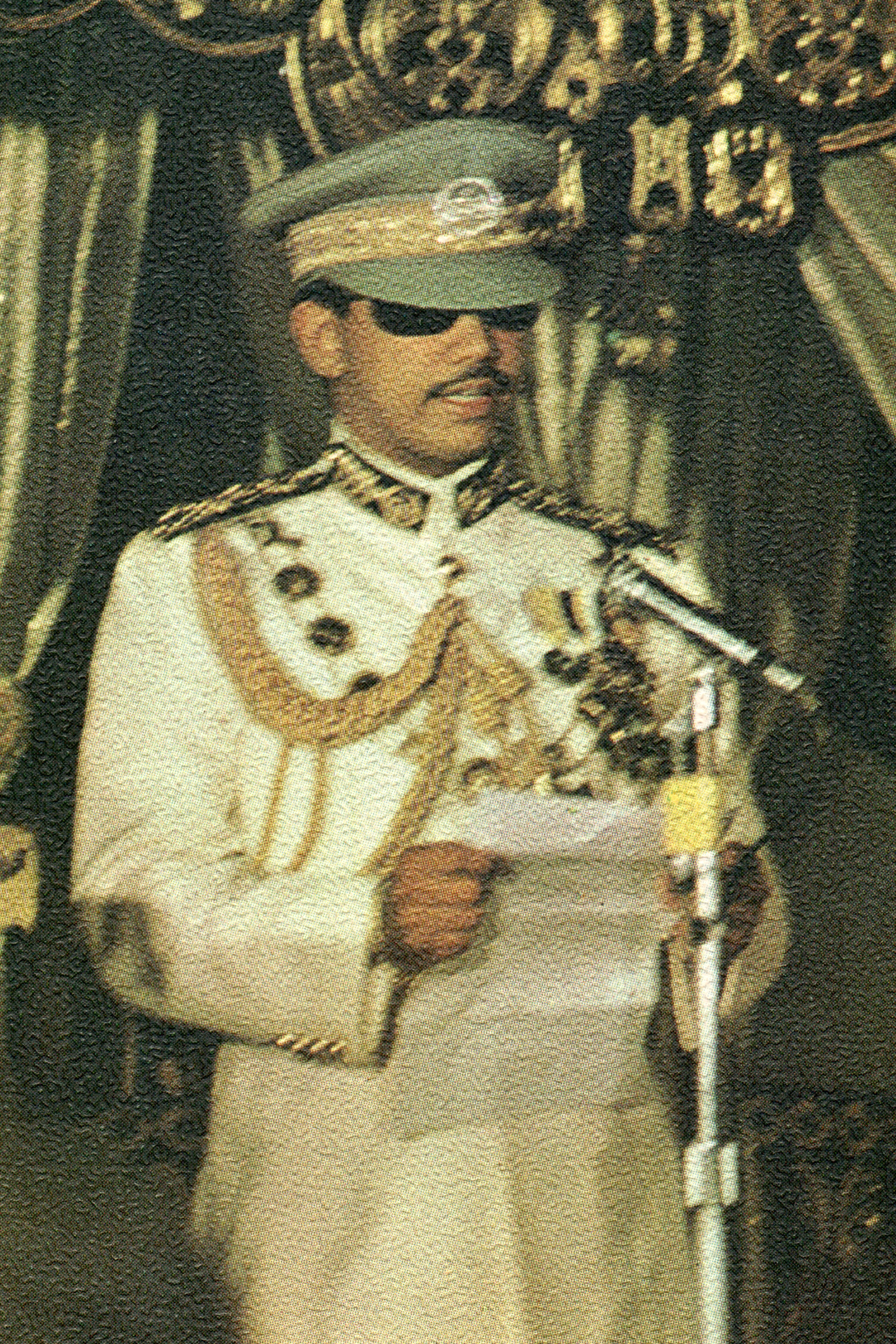
Hassanal Bolkiah speaking at his accession ceremony

Omar Ali Saifuddien III announced his abdication on the evening of 4 October 1967. Hassanal Bolkiah, then aged 21, immediately returned to Brunei from England to assume his father's responsibilities as leader of the country's government and populace. At night, Pengiran Pemancha Anak Haji Mohamed Alam, the Chief of Adat Istiadat Negara, made the abdication public on Radio Brunei.

Hassanal Bolkiah's proclamation took place the next day, on 5 October 1967, at 3:00 p.m., in a public ceremony in the Balai Singgahsana of Istana Darul Hana, in which he was designated Sultan Hassanal Bolkiah Muiz'zaddin Wad'daulah, the 29th Sultan of Brunei. State dignitaries, including the Wazir, Cheteria, Acting Menteri Besar, and Legislative Council (LegCo) members, were present during the occasion.

The Acting Menteri Besar represented government officials at the ceremony by pledging, "loyalty that does not waver even for a single point and is similar to what was once offered to Paduka Ayahanda Baginda (His Majesty's Father)... His Majesty will follow in the footsteps and example of Paduka Ayahanda Baginda in performing his role as Sultan." In Hassanal Bolkiah's first titah (speech) inside the Balai Singgahsana as Sultan of Brunei, he stated:

I, as Sultan of Negara Brunei Darussalam, would endeavour to carry out the policies of my dear father, and would always safeguard and preserve the peace, tranquility and prosperity of the country.

— Sultan Hassanal Bolkiah Mu’izzaddien Waddaulah, 5 October 1967

=== Coronation ===
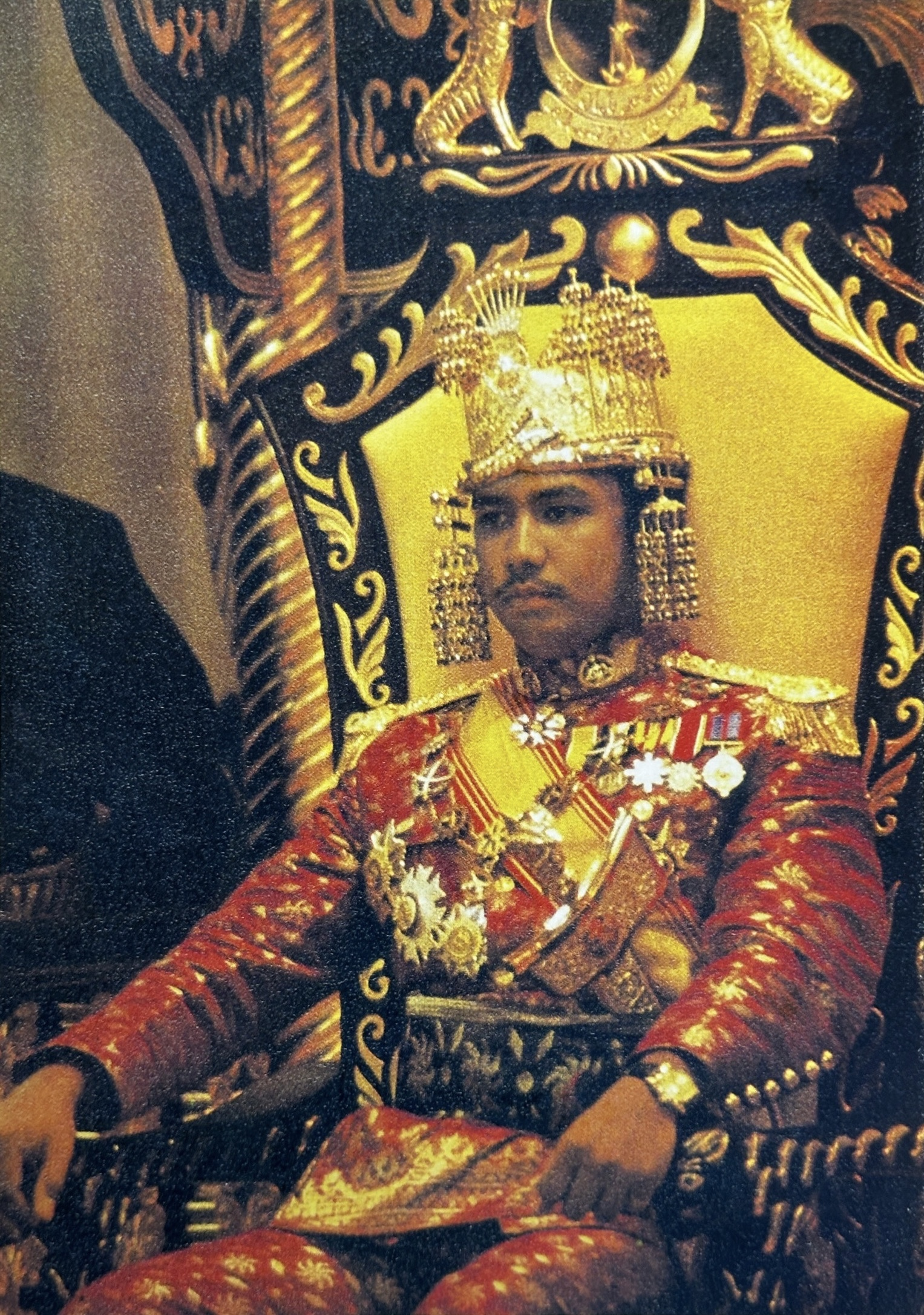
Hassanal Bolkiah at his coronation, 1968

A meeting of the country's nobles and high-ranking officials was held six months prior to the date of Perpuspaan (Coronation) to decide what would be done in the ceremony. An official announcement was sent to all districts of Brunei, and from that point on Bukit Sungai Kebun a red flag was raised, and on Bukit Panggal a yellow flag. On 8 January 1968, at 8:15 pm, the Acting Menteri Besar announced the date of the coronation on Radio Brunei:

So I hereby act as Acting Chief Administrative Officer of the State of Brunei to uphold the agreement that has been approved by His Majesty the Sultan in the Privy Council which convened on the 8 January 1968, declared that the date of the coronation of Sultan Hassanal Bolkiah Muiz'zaddin Wad'daulah, Sultan of Brunei, will be held on the 1 August 1968, same to 6 Jamadil-Awal 1388, that is on Thursday.

— Yang Amat Berhormat Pengiran Dato Seri Utama Haji Mohd. Yusuf, 8 January 1968

On 1 February 1968, two groups of individuals left for Bukit Panggal and Bukit Sungai Kebun. Yang Berhormat Pehin Orang Kaya Perdana Haji Muhammad officially hoisted the red ceremonial flag on Bukit Sungai Kebun while the yellow flag on Bukit Panggal was raised by Yang Dimuliakan Pehin Orang Kaya Shahbandar Haji Ahmad. According to Bruneian tradition, Sultan Hassanal Bolkiah Mu'izzaddin Waddaulah's coronation begins with the flag raising ceremonies in these two communities of the red and yellow flags. The coverage of the coronation that Radio Brunei and the Information Department provided was hailed as the year's most excellent program. Furthermore, the Coronation Committee contracted a Japanese film firm to make a coloured film that documented the occasion. The film was distributed in 35 mm and 16 mm films for global distribution.

As thousands of residents and tourists flocked to vantage points in Pusat Bandar, access to which had been limited (except from official vehicles) since early in the morning, dignitaries from near and far saw the age-old rite in the newly built Lapau. With the back roof dropped to make himself visible, the Sultan arrived in his brand-new six-door Mercedes-Benz 600 Pullman Landaulet following the customary Muslim washing rite at the palace, which was preceded by a 21-gun salute.

At the fire station, the Sultan and his similarly colourful attendants entered the Usongan Diraja (Royal Chariot). The Sultan was wearing a red and gold ceremonial dress, gleaming with his medals' insignia. Specifically constructed for the coronation, the chariot included a tiger skin throne and a body composed of 26 carved wooden panels embellished with 24-carat gold lead and precious diamonds. About 85 feet (26 m) long, it was driven on 1 August 1968, by fifty soldiers from the fifty specially selected black-dressed soldiers of the Royal Brunei Malay Regiment (RBMR).

He had the crown placed on his head and handed him the Keris si-Naga, symbol of supreme royal power in Brunei, by his father, Paduka Seri Begawan Sultan Omar Ali Saifuddien. Following this he removed his ceremonial sabre, swearing loyalty to his son as head of state and religion. His brothers and the senior ranked nobility did the same as well. Like his father before him, the new Sultan took vows to maintain the peace and the prosperity of the nation. He also promised to improve the standard of living of his subjects through various development projects, and to protect and uphold Islam and Brunei's customs and traditions. After the crowning ceremony, the new Sultan proceeded in procession through the capital, passing lines of school children cheering Daulat Tuanku (Long Live the King).

Among the foreign dignitaries who attended the ceremony were prime ministers Lee Kuan Yew of Singapore and Tunku Abdul Rahman of Malaysia, as well as the British High Commissioner to Brunei, Arthur Adair, who represented Queen Elizabeth II. To commemorate the event, the Coronation Medal and stamps were established.

=== Early reign ===
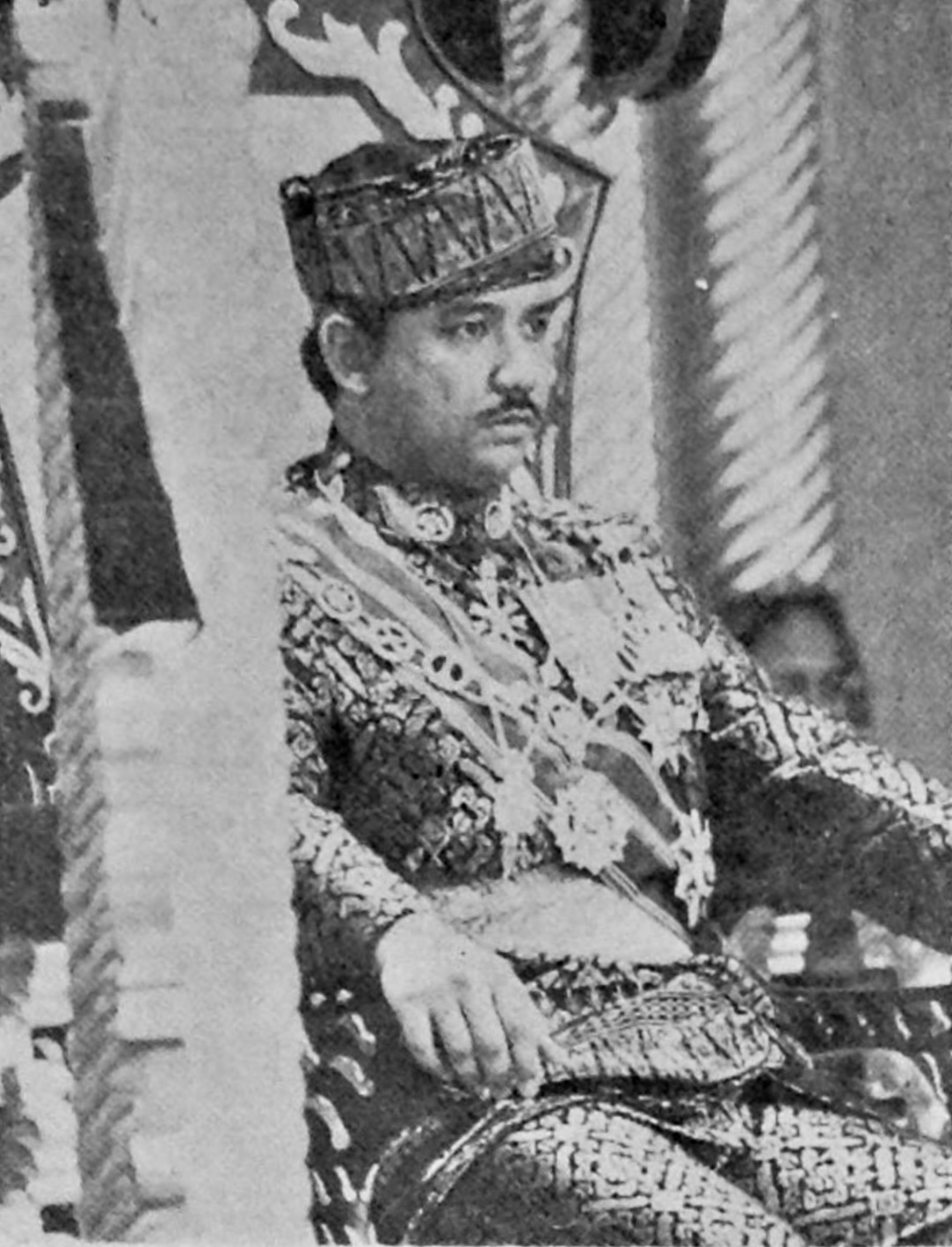
Hassanal Bolkiah at a state ceremony in 1970

Hassanal Bolkiah was advised by his father on all significant decisions because of his youth and lack of expertise in state administration matters. When he gave a speech at his coronation, he clarified this problem. Despite previously affirming that he would not be involved in politics, the directive indicated that the Sultan still retained the ability to influence the politics of Brunei. His father's participation strengthened the case for the royal family's stability because of the "power behind the throne". Under the 1959 Constitution of Brunei, the Sultan is the head of state with full executive authority, a position strengthened by an emergency proclamation imposed since the 1962 Brunei revolt.

The British government's demand for Brunei to become an independent parliamentary democracy conflicted with Hassanal Bolkiah's and his father's preference for maintaining the monarchical political structure. They were concerned about Brunei's security and defence capabilities and assessed the nation was not ready for independence from British protection. During visits by Malcolm MacDonald in January 1968 and George Thomson in April 1968, the Sultan and his father expressed their worries about the consequences of a British military withdrawal from the Far East.

A delegation led by Hassanal Bolkiah travelled to London to discuss Brunei's political future. From 19 September to 26 October 1968, the delegation held negotiations with British officials, focusing on the stationing of Gurkha troops and the provisions of the 1959 Agreement concerning Brunei's security clause and British responsibility for its foreign affairs, both set to expire in November 1970. Despite the fact that the first round of negotiations did not result in a change of heart from the British regarding Brunei, he remained optimistic and pursued more talks.

Between May and December 1969, Hassanal Bolkiah made three journeys to London in an attempt to establish contact with the British government; however, these travels were unsuccessful. The British government persisted in pushing for the removal of all military troops, including those stationed in Brunei. On 14 November 1969, the Sultan travelled to London to resume talks with Malcolm Shepherd and Michael Stewart. Accompanied by Prince Mohamed Bolkiah and other officials. Despite these efforts, the British Labour Party government persisted in its resolve to cede sovereignty of Brunei.

Hassanal Bolkiah made another trip to London in April 1970 in an attempt to break the stalemate in the negotiations, but the British government refused to compromise since it thought Brunei could defend itself on its own without British assistance. Given that the defence pact was about to expire in November 1970, he expressed significant concern about this, saying that "even if half the male population were to join the Armed Forces, Brunei would not be able to defend itself.

With the election of the Conservative Party, Hassanal Bolkiah found new hope. The British government agreed to keep a limited presence of British troops in Southeast Asia, which included keeping Gurkha troops stationed in Brunei, and decided not to renounce the 1959 Agreement, which was scheduled to expire on 30 June 1970. This resulted in successful negotiations with Anthony Royle in November 1970. These negotiations led to the signing of the Brunei–British Friendship Agreement on 23 November 1971, which gave Brunei "full internal independence" and restricted the authority of the British High Commissioner to matters concerning foreign affairs.

At the age of 25, Sultan Hassanal Bolkiah was named Inspector-General of the Royal Brunei Police Force (RBPF) and General of the RBMR on 17 July 1971. In an earlier statement on 14 July, he stated that this was "in accordance with long established Royal Custom in other countries." The commander of the RBMR, Colonel John Simpson, declared this to be a noteworthy distinction and an effort to fortify the relationship between the army and the royal family.

A budget of B$500 million was allotted for the Third National Development Plan (RKN 3), which was enacted between 1975 and 1979. The following objectives were given priority in the formulation and design of the plan to maintain a high level of employment and diversify the economy through accelerated development of agriculture and industry. With a budget of B$2.2 billion, the RKN 4 (1980–1984) placed a strong emphasis on advancing the economic, social, and cultural well-being of the populace. With a budget of $B3.7 billion, the RKN 5 (1986–1990) aimed to offer the numerous services and infrastructure necessary to raise peoples' standards of living while advancing the nation's economic and social growth.

Per Chapter 55 of the 1959 Constitution, the LegCo elected in 1970 was dissolved on 15 December 1977, with the Sultan's approval. He consented to restructure and reappoint a number of the council's former members. On 22 December 1977, a new council was formally called back to order. The next day, Hassanal Bolkiah dissolved the council.

=== Independence of Brunei ===
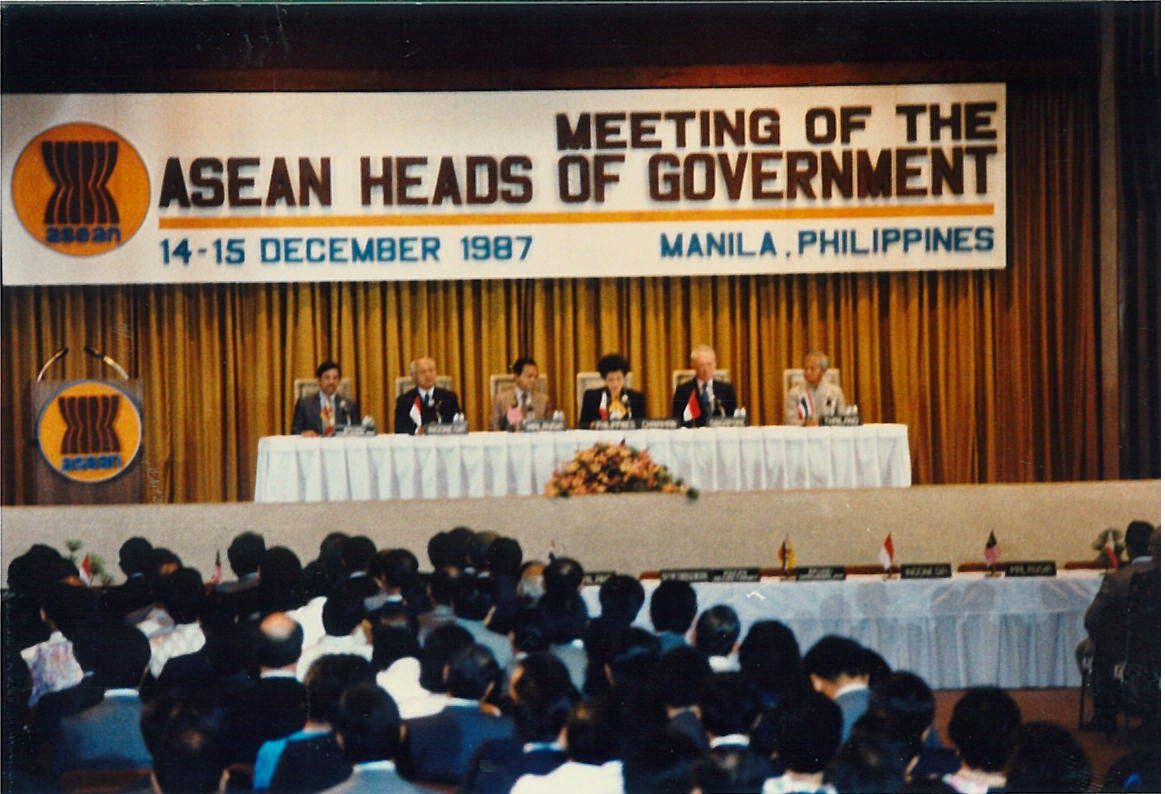
Hassanal Bolkiah (seated far left) at the 3rd ASEAN Summit on 14–15 December 1987

Hassanal Bolkiah headed another mission to London in 1978 to negotiate Brunei's status as an independent sovereign state with the British government. The result was the Treaty of Friendship and Cooperation between Brunei and Great Britain, which took effect on 1 January 1984, and released the British government from its duties managing Brunei's foreign affairs and defence. This marked Brunei's transition to an independent sovereign monarchy. Hassanal Bolkiah recited the Declaration of Independence at midnight.

Whereas, the time has now arrived when Brunei Darussalam will resume full international responsibility as a sovereign and independent nation in the community of nations.

— Sultan Haji Hassanal Bolkiah Mu'izzaddin Waddaulah, 1 January 1984

On the country's independence, Hassanal Bolkiah assumed the portfolios of Prime Minister, Minister of Home Affairs and Minister of Finance. (Note: Hassanal Bolkiah named six other ministers, including his father as the Minister of Defence, Prince Mohamed Bolkiah (Minister of Foreign Affairs), Prince Jefri Bolkiah (Minister of Culture, Youth and Sports and Minister of Finance), Pengiran Bahrin (Minister of Law and Minister of Communication) and Pehin Dato Haji Abdul Aziz (Minister of Education and Health).) At the same time, he declared Melayu Islam Beraja (MIB) as the national philosophy. It serves as a pillar of life for the citizens of the nation, regardless of religion, culture, or social background; the royal family, Malay cultural values, and Islamic religious teachings have all contributed to the nation's historical heritage that is still upheld today. They have also served as a fortress to protect Brunei from outside influences. The Sultan presided over Brunei's first National Day celebrations on 23 February 1984.

Hassanal Bolkiah reestablished the LegCo on 27 December 1983, and it was dissolved on 13 February 1984. He gave a contribution of B$210,000 to the United Nations International School (UNIS). Pengiran Bahrin, his special envoy, presented the gift to Refauddin Ahmad, chairman of the board of UNIS, on the occasion of the United Nations' 40th anniversary and the first anniversary of Brunei's membership.

With a budget of B$5.5 billion, the RKN 6 (1991–1995) intended to address the demands of the country, particularly in enhancing the standard of living and quality of life of its citizens as well as further bolstering the national economy. The RKN 7 (1996–2000) of a 20-year long-term development plan that began in 1985 and has a total budget of B$7.2 billion is the seventh national development plan. The plan aimed to raise the nation's economic achievement while continuing to significantly improve the quality of life for the populace. He appointed himself as the Minister of Finance on 23 February 1997. He had previously held the post from 1984 to 1986 before it was taken over by his brother Prince Jefri Bolkiah.

=== Silver Jubilee ===
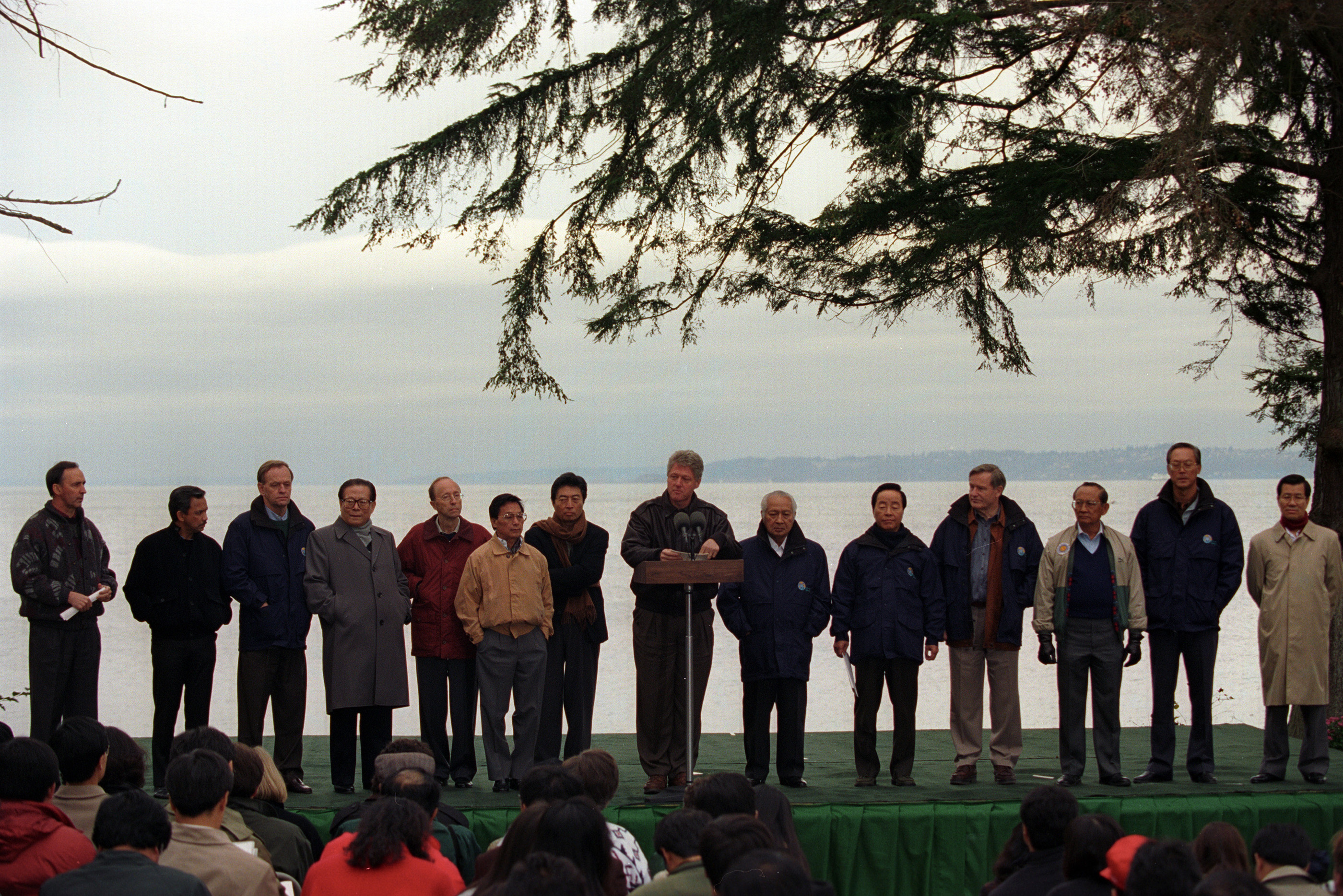
Hassanal Bolkiah (second from left) attending the 1993 APEC Summit on Blake Island, Seattle

The Silver Jubilee of 1992 commemorated 25 years since Hassanal Bolkiah's accession to the throne. An estimated $200 million was spent by Brunei to commemorate the event, which included building a 6,000-seat mosque with a gold dome, 21 guest homes for visiting dignitaries, an exhibition centre, and 200 Mercedes-Benz automobiles for visitors. To commemorate the milestone, the Churchill Memorial Building became the Royal Brunei Regalia Building in 1992. Established to commemorate the event, the Silver Jubilee Medal (Pingat Jubli Perak) was given out in three classes: gold, silver, and bronze.

The culmination of all the activities was a glamorous banquet held at the Istana Nurul Iman, where the Yang di-Pertuan Agong Azlan Shah and Raja Permaisuri Tuanku Bainun of Malaysia, Prince Edward, and the Sultans and Consorts of the Malaysian states were among the royal attendees. The sultan made an appearance before his people during a ceremony at the Istana Nurul Iman, accompanied by his two wives and ten children, all of whom were dressed in yellow attire and dazzling in jewels. "My late father's policies, particularly in safeguarding peace, increasing the standard of living of the people and the prosperity of the country, as well as upholding... Islam," the 46-year-old sultan pledged in a brief address. After that, the sultan travelled to the capital in a Rolls-Royce Silver Spur limousine and rode a massive chariot made of wood and gold that had servants dressed in black costume.

The people of Kuala Belait gifted The Silver Jubilee Park as a memorial to the occasion. The recreational park known as Sultan Haji Hassanal Bolkiah Silver Jubilee Park is a popular tourist destination and landmark in the neighbourhood. He ordered the creation of a foundation called as the Sultan Haji Hassanal Bolkiah Foundation in connection with the Silver Jubilee Celebration of Sultan Hassanal Bolkiah assuming the throne on 5 October 1992.

=== The new millennium ===
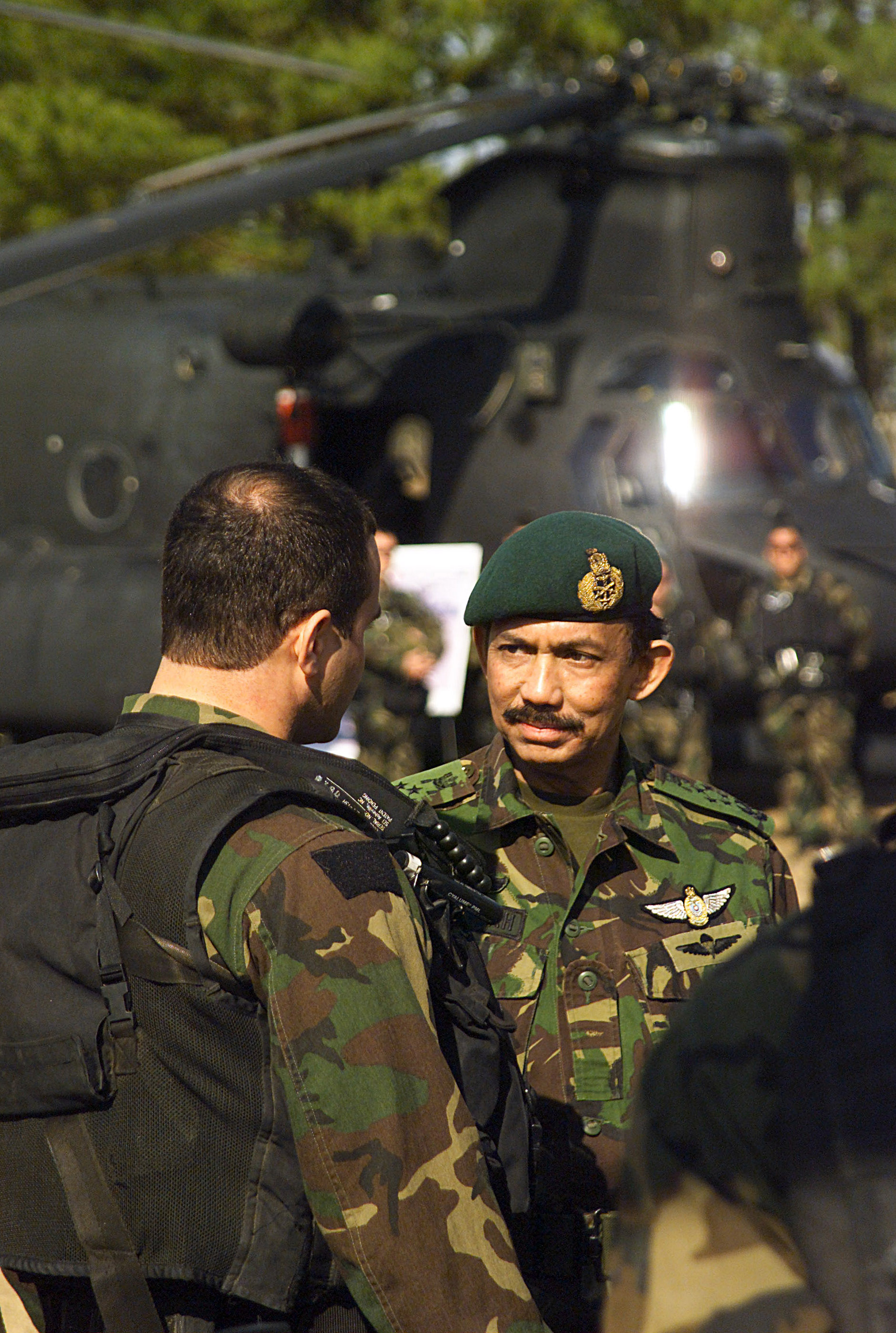
Hassanal Bolkiah visiting Fort Campbell on 17 December 2002

In 2004, the LegCo, which had been dissolved since 1962, was reopened. The proposed amendment to the 1959 constitution was the first item on the agenda when the Sultan convened again on 25 September 2004, following a 21-year break. A proposal to amend the constitution to expand the LegCo to 45 seats, 15 of which would have been elected, was passed by the council. On 1 September 2005, the Sultan dissolved the council; the next day, the council was recreated using the revised Brunei Constitution.

In September 2005, the Sultan nominated five members to the new LegCo, who were indirectly elected to represent village councils. Plans for a 45-member legislature with 15 seats up for public election were on the table in 2006 and 2007, but by year's end, elections had still not been set. The Internal Security Act (ISA) essentially preserves the sultan's personal authority, while all state power is still held by the sultan's family and designated heirs. On 9 March 2006, the Sultan was reported to have amended Brunei's constitution to make himself infallible under Bruneian law.

On 4 March 2008, the LegCo convened its inaugural meeting of the fourth session in the new facility located in Jalan Kebangsaan. Soon after receiving the Royal Salute and seeing the guard of honour consisting of RBPF officers, the Sultan presided over the grand inauguration by signing a plaque.

At the Hassanal Bolkiah National Stadium on 23 February 2009, Sultan Hassanal Bolkiah was present at Brunei's Silver Jubilee National Day celebration, accompanied by members of his royal family and official leaders. Following the guard of honour inspection and the march past, the Sultan was present when up to 25 young people representing various government agencies, the private sector, higher education institutions, and associations read the National Day oath. The faultless field performances, which were broken up into six parts, were created to represent the topic of the celebration was Kedewasaan Bernegara (Maturity of the Nation). To commemorate the event, he established the Silver Jubilee National Day Medal.

The RKN theme of "Knowledge and Innovation, Increase Productivity, Accelerated Economic Growth" centered the RKN 10 (2012–2017) on developmental initiatives to achieve faster and higher economic growth.

In 2014, Hassanal Bolkiah declared the implementation of strict Islamic criminal penalties, moving forward with proposals that prompted both rare domestic opposition to the opulently wealthy ruler and also worldwide outrage. The small sultanate's plans for the sharia penalties, which would eventually include flogging, amputation of limbs, and death by stoning, sparked outrage on social networking sites. Following the unexplained delay of the penalties' anticipated implementation on 22 April 2014, which prompted speculation that he was hesitant, uncertainty surrounded their execution. However, he stated in his proclamation that the action was "a must" in light of Islam, dismissing the "never-ending theories" that the sharia's penalties were harsh in remarks that were obviously directed at critics.

Hassanal Bolkiah also banned public celebrations of Christmas in 2015, including wearing hats or clothes that resemble Santa Claus. The ban only affects local Muslims. Christians are still allowed to celebrate Christmas. According to the late Bruneian Bishop and Cardinal Cornelius Sim, on 25 December 2015, there was an estimated 4,000 out of 18,000 Bruneian Catholics, mainly Chinese and expats living in the country, who attended mass on Christmas Eve and Christmas Day. While there was no absolute ban on celebrations, there was a ban affecting Christmas decorations in public places, especially shopping malls.

Following the 2015 Bruneian cabinet reshuffle on 22 October, Hassanal Bolkiah appointed himself as the country's Minister of Foreign Affairs, thus replacing his younger brother Prince Mohamed Bolkiah. The RKN11 (2018–2023), whose theme was "Increased Non-Oil and Gas Sector Output as Catalysts for Economic Growth," further integrated development efforts in the production of the non-oil and gas sector.

=== Golden Jubilee ===
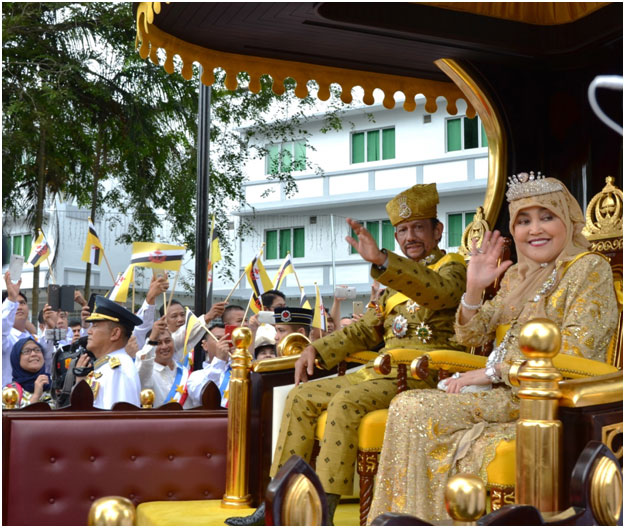
Hassanal Bolkiah and Pengiran Anak Saleha being transported in the royal chariot on 5 October 2017

The 50th anniversary of his royal ascension was celebrated on 5 October 2017, he declared during his speech that it was the "most historic day" for both Bruneians and himself. In addition, the Sultan stated that he and his people needed to exercise "reciprocal responsibility". According to press releases from their respective countries, Prime Ministers Lee Hsien Loong of Singapore, Hun Sen of Cambodia, Najib Razak of Malaysia, State Counsellor Aung San Suu Kyi of Myanmar, President Rodrigo Duterte of the Philippines and Joko Widodo of Indonesia were scheduled to attend the festivities. Among the many royal guests in attendance were Prince Edward and his wife, Sophie.

Ahead of the Golden Jubilee parade, 80,000 people gathered in the heart of the capital under the shadow of low-lying clouds outside the Istana Nurul Iman. The Grand Chamberlain led the royal parade, and the marching bands of the RBPF and the Royal Brunei Armed Forces (RBAF) followed. The Sultan got onto his royal chariot in front of the Bandar Seri Begawan Fire Station. As he entered the streets, tens of thousands of well-wishers cheered, Daulat Kebawah Duli Tuan Patik! Daulat (Long live the king), while waving the national flag.

The sultan's palace hosted festivities earlier, with the Sultan and the Queen consort sitting on golden thrones for a royal audience and an honor guard firing a 21-gun salute. The royal chariot pulled by fifty specially chosen workers across a 5 kilometres (3.1 mi) course. Crown Prince Al-Muhtadee Billah, Princes Abdul Azim, Abdul Malik, Abdul Mateen and Abdul Wakeel, and Princess Rashidah Sa'adatul Bolkiah joined on the chariot. A custom typically saved for royal occasions, visitors and locals alike were shown drumming and the lavish display of gold and silver weapons, including the Kampilan (dagger) and Kalasak (shield).

The Sultan's Golden Jubilee would be celebrated with a number of events in October, including the opening of the Raja Isteri Pengiran Anak Hajah Saleha Bridge on 14 October and inauguration of the Eco-Corridor Park on 22 October. Furthermore, the sultan's Golden Jubilee Medal was created with three distinct classes. The Royal Regalia Museum has been the new name of the Royal Regalia Building since 2 December 2017, in honour of his golden jubilee celebration.

=== Pandemic and beyond ===
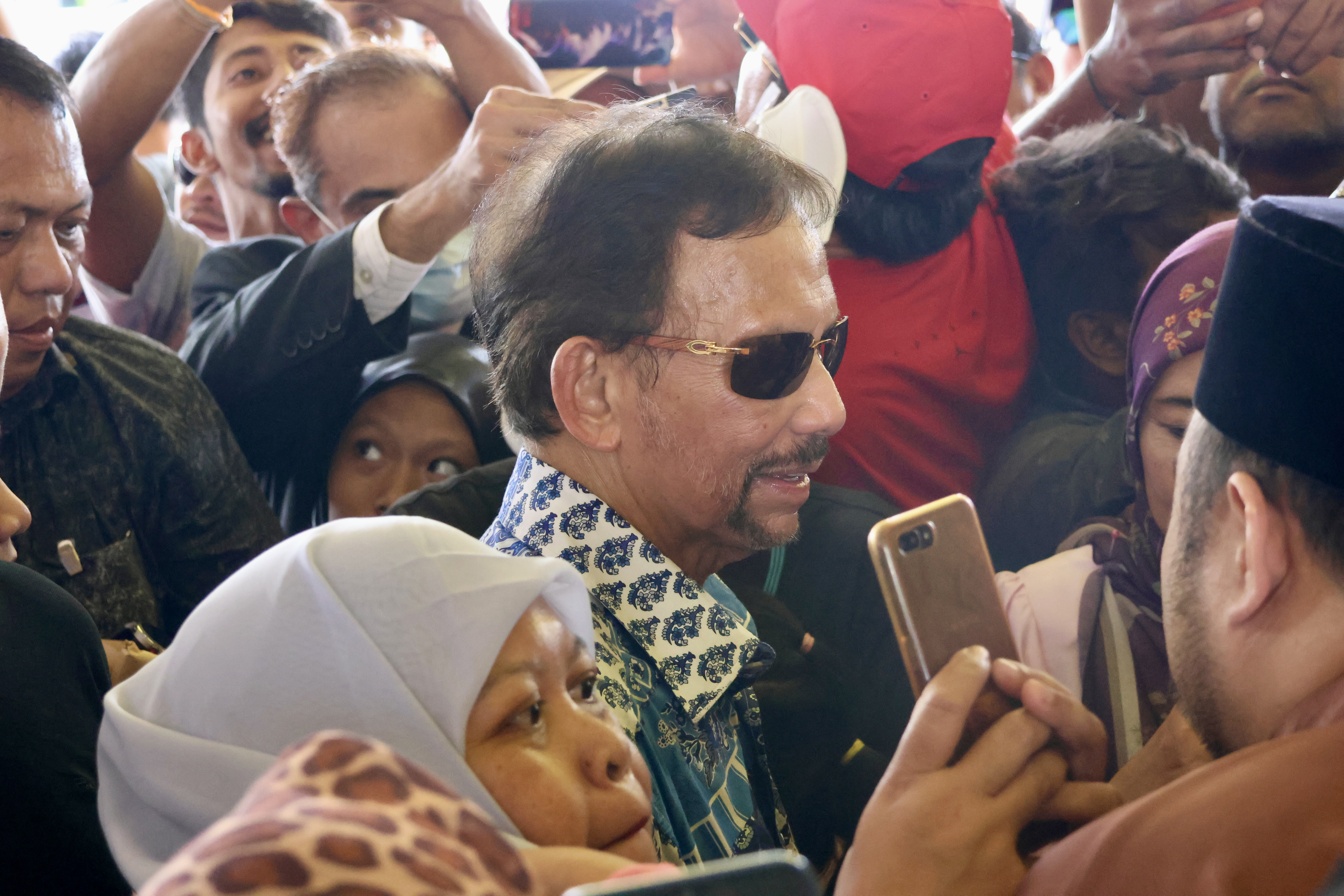
Hassanal Bolkiah on his 2023 visit to the Belait District, seen greeting the populace

During the COVID-19 pandemic in Brunei, Hassanal Bolkiah was described by the Australian Institute of International Affairs as having "demonstrated his leadership" by instituting restrictions on travel to and from Brunei in March 2020. The sultan also advised Bruneians to observe social distancing guidelines and redouble their adherence to prayers and the Quran, saying that for Muslims, the virus itself was "sent by God". On 1 April 2021, he was given a COVID-19 vaccination at the Istana Nurul Iman.

On 19 September 2022, the Sultan and Prince Abdul Mateen attended Queen Elizabeth II's state funeral at Westminster Abbey in London. In response to the Queen's death, the sultan ordered that the national flag be flown at half-mast at government buildings and the offices of Brunei's diplomatic missions abroad.

During the Gaza war, Hassanal Bolkiah called on the international community and the United Nations Security Council to support comprehensive peace efforts in the Middle East while attending an ASEAN–GCC summit in October 2023. He reaffirmed Brunei's support for Palestinians in a statement to the UN on the International Day of Solidarity with the Palestinian People in December 2023. His government established the National Committee for the Humanitarian Fund for Palestinians in Gaza to coordinate relief efforts.

During a speech on 22 February 2024, Brunei's 40th National Day, Hassanal Bolkiah referred to the nation's independence as a "blessing" from God. He underlined that unity and patriotism are essential for upholding the value of religion, sovereignty, and national identity. He also underlined that genuine independence involves freedom and harmony, attained through the sacrifices of previous and present generations. The Sultan further attributed Brunei's strong performance in international indices to the RKN's success in developing the country's workforce and putting creative solutions into practice.

== Foreign policy ==
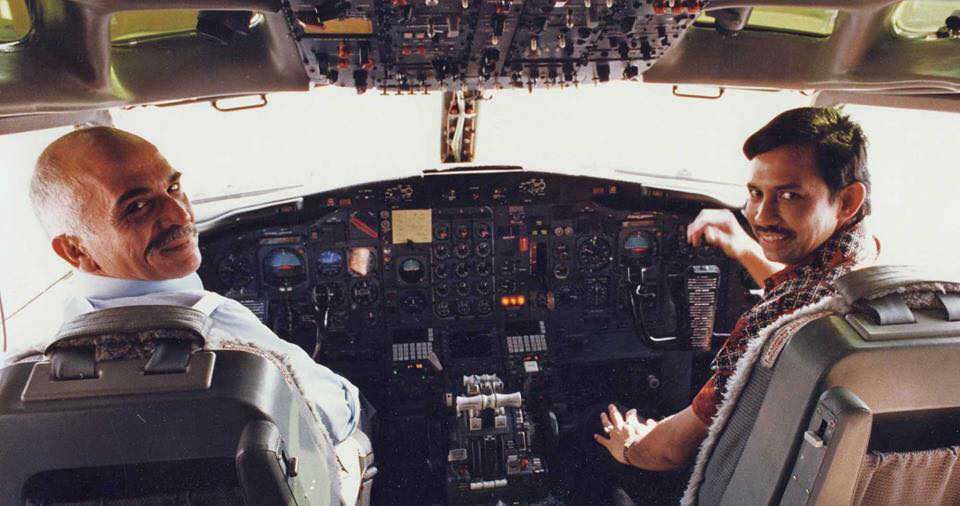
Hassanal Bolkiah in the cockpit with King Hussein of Jordan, 1984

Hassanal Bolkiah likewise places great emphasis on fostering and fortifying ties with the outside world. He has taken numerous trips around Europe, the Middle East, Southeast and East Asia, and the United States. Bolkiah addressed the United Nations General Assembly on Brunei's admission to the United Nations in September 1984. Brunei was also admitted to ASEAN that same year, and he formally established diplomatic ties with a number of nations, including Singapore. Like his father, he was knighted by Queen Elizabeth II of the United Kingdom, of which Brunei was a protectorate until 1984. He chaired an APEC leaders' summit in 2000 when Brunei held the rotating presidency of the organisation. He also chaired the ASEAN summits of 2013 and 2021.

Following the two countries' signing of the Trade and Investment Framework Agreement (TIFA) in Washington, D.C. on 16 December 2002, trade and investment relations between Brunei and the United States are expected to expand. On 27 December 2004, Brunei signed the Multilateral Agreement on the Liberalization of Passenger Air Services. An open skies agreement that grants unrestricted rights for third and fourth freedom traffic allows airlines operated by Brunei to operate into signatory states and transport passengers from non-signatory countries. Singapore and Thailand are among the other parties to this agreement.

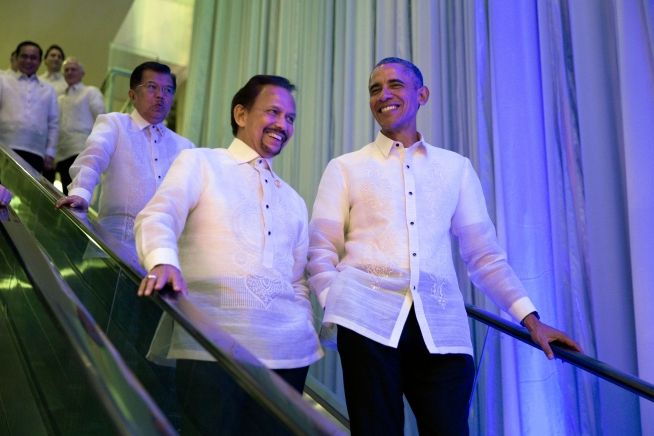
Hassanal Bolkiah with President Barack Obama in 2015

Following the signing of the bilateral liberalized air services agreement by the two governments on 19 April 2005, Brunei's open skies policy currently extends to its air connectivity with the United Arab Emirates. The signing of the "Agreement between Japan and Brunei Darussalam for an Economic Partnership" on 18 June 2007, made it possible for Brunei and Japan to collaborate in the areas of energy, human resource development, and capability upgrading. On 25 July 2008, Kuwait and Brunei signed a Memorandum of Understanding (MoU) in the fields of economics and technology. On 11 August 2008, Brunei and Kenya established formal diplomatic ties.

Hassanal Bolkiah said in front of world leaders on 30 September 2015 that the UN has no equivalent and that its 70-year existence is proof of its significance, despite what some may say about its efficacy. In order to eradicate poverty, combat inequality, and combat climate change over the following 15 years, all 193 UN Member States endorsed the 2030 Agenda for Sustainable Development, to which he was alluding. The Association of Southeast Asian Nations (ASEAN) member states in his area, he said, share the values of territorial integrity, non-interference, the rule of law, and good governance, which serve as a framework for attempts to increase cooperation for peace. He said that one method to do this is through cultural exchanges to promote more empathy and understanding among people, which may also help avert future conflicts.

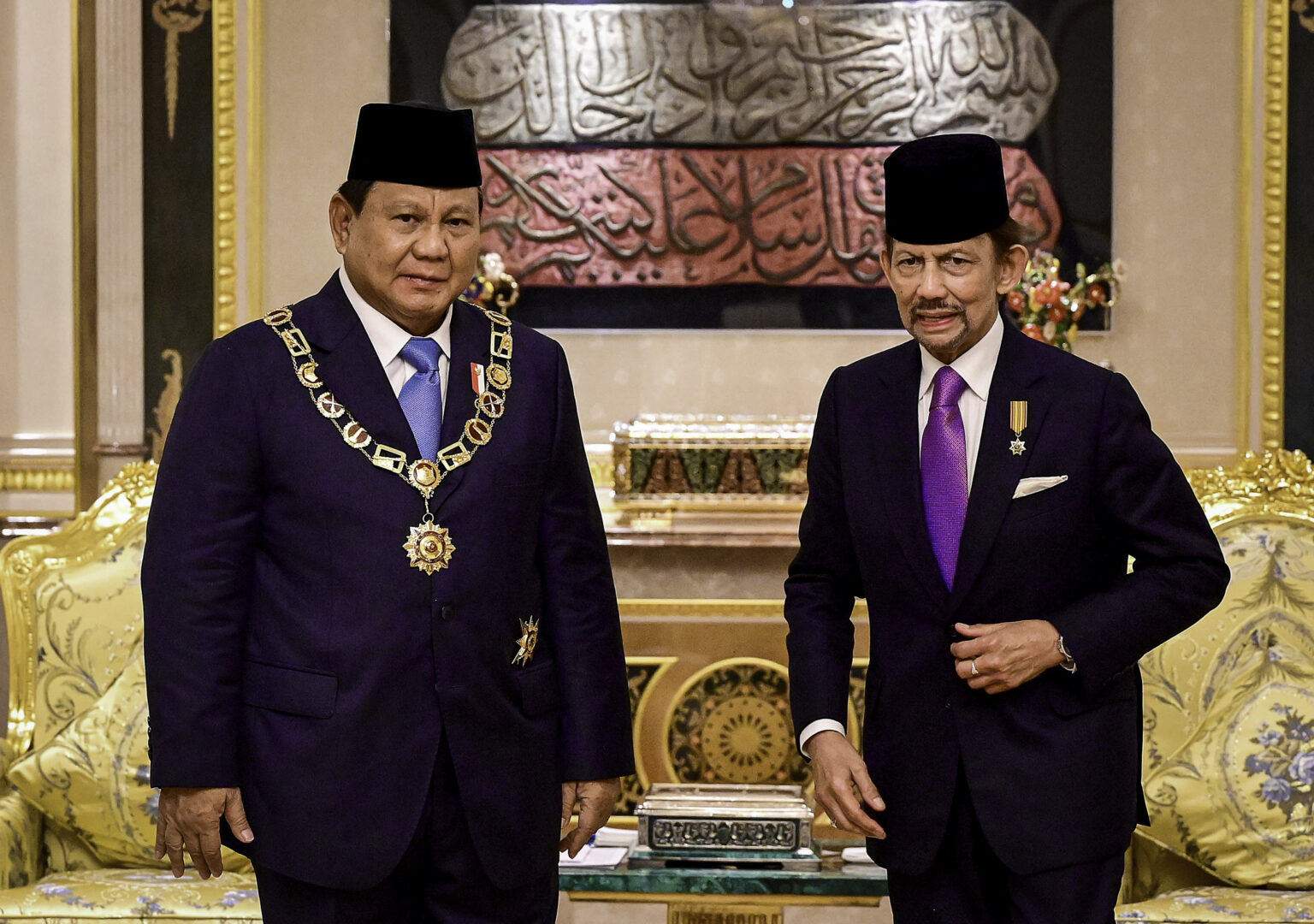
Hassanal Bolkiah with Indonesian President Prabowo Subianto at the Istana Nurul Iman in 2025

Singapore and Brunei commemorated their forty years of bilateral defence relations in August 2016. He paid his fourth state visit to Singapore on 5–6 July 2017, as the two nations commemorated the 50th anniversary of the Currency Interchangeability Agreement (CIA). Commemorative $50 notes were introduced by him and Prime Minister Lee Hsien Loong. Additionally, former President Tony Tan Keng Yam treated him to a state banquet.

Hassanal Bolkiah and Chinese President Xi Jinping met in Bangkok on 18 November 2022. He visited Bahrain on 9–11 June 2023, at the request of its king Hamad bin Isa Al Khalifa. On the occasion of the 35th anniversary of their diplomatic ties, this visit highlights the close bilateral connections that exist between Bahrain and Brunei and seeks to further collaboration in the areas of finance, investment, and military.

In June 2026, Bolkiah attended the ASEAN–Russia Commemorative Summit at the Kazan Expo International Exhibition Centre in Kazan, Russia, where he met with Russian President Vladimir Putin and discussed the ASEAN–Russia dialogue partnership. The summit concluded with the adoption of the Kazan Declaration.

== Controversies ==
=== Shannon Marketic Incident ===
In 1997, Shannon Marketic sued Prince Jefri Bolkiah, younger brother of Hassanal Bolkiah, claiming that she and other women were hired for promotional work but instead held as a "virtual prisoner", drugged and sexually abused. The sultan denied the claims. Marketic's lawsuit named Miss USA 1997 Brandi Sherwood as also being a victim; however, Sherwood declined to file her own lawsuit. After 18 months of litigation, a judge at the US court dismissed the lawsuit on the grounds that the Sultan had sovereign immunity as head of state.

=== Amedeo crisis ===
Hassanal had open disagreements with his brother Prince Jefri Bolkiah, who owned a network of companies and investment vehicles under the name "Amedeo Development Corporation" run by his son Pengiran Muda Abdul Hakeem, which was used to buy the luxury goods company Asprey and build an amusement park and other projects in Brunei. In July 1998 the Amedeo group collapsed under US$10 billion in debt. Between 1983 and mid-1998 some US$40 billion of what were called "special transfers" were made from the accounts of the Brunei Investment Agency (BIA). An independent investigation was undertaken into the circumstances of these special transfers, concluding that in round figures, US$14.8 billion were paid to the accounts of Prince Jefri apart from the US$8 billion to accounts of the sultan and US$3.8 billion for Government purposes. The destination, purpose and recipients of the remaining transfers were not established. Due to the secretive nature of the state and the blurred lines as to where the royal family's finances and the state finances began and ended, establishing the true course of events is very difficult.

Prince Jefri was accused of misappropriating state funds to pay for his own personal investments, bought through BIA and Amedeo companies and removed from his position as head of BIA. In February 2000, the Bruneian government attempted to obtain a freezing order on Prince Jefri's overseas assets, which led to him countersuing in New York. Following protracted negotiations a settlement agreement was signed by the Prince in May 2000, the terms of which were never made public. However, Prince Jefri claimed assurances were made to him by the sultan with regards to keeping certain properties to maintain his lifestyle, which BIA denied. In accordance with the settlement agreement signed in 2000, the prince began to return his assets to the state, including more than 500 properties, both in Brunei and abroad, about 2500 cars, 100 paintings, five boats, and nine aircraft. In 2001 ten thousand lots of Prince Jefri's possessions went to auction.

The BIA alleged that the Prince failed to uphold the agreement by failing to disclose all his accounts, and allowing money to be taken from frozen accounts, and restarted legal proceedings to gain full control of the Prince's assets. After a number of appeals, this finally reached the Privy Council in London, which can serve as Brunei's highest court of appeal as a result of Brunei's former protectorate status. The Privy Council rejected Prince Jefri's evidence, describing his contention that the agreement allowed for him to retain a number of properties as "simply incredible", and ruled in favour of the Government of Brunei and the BIA; consequently the Prince's appeal was dismissed and he was ordered to return the rest of his assets to Brunei. The decision of the Privy Council did not end the litigation between Prince Jefri and the BIA. The BIA re-opened proceedings in Malaysia and the Cayman Islands, resulting in the BIA gaining control over the Hotel Bel-Air in Los Angeles and The New York Palace Hotel in Manhattan.

The BIA also reopened collateral litigation in the High Court of England and Wales. After winning before the Privy Council, the BIA asked the court to determine whether Prince Jefri should be held in contempt of court for allegedly making misstatements in his listing of assets. The contempt proceeding was scheduled for a hearing in June 2008, but the Prince did not attend, instead going to Paris. Judge Peter Smith did not rule on whether Prince Jefri was in contempt, but did issue a warrant for his arrest.

As of October 2009, Prince Jefri appears to have been allowed back to Brunei. He is not back in any official government role but retains all his royal titles and decorations and remains in the royal protocol order. He is seen at major national functions like the national teachers day celebrations, the sultan's birthday and at the national day celebrations. His most recent appearance was at the legislative council opening ceremony in March 2012.

=== Anti-LGBT and death by stoning legislation ===
As Prime Minister, Hassanal Bolkiah has spearheaded legislation that would introduce capital punishment by stoning for homosexuality and adultery, effective from 3 April 2019. This sparked international protests. The policy resulted in calls for boycotts of numerous companies owned by the Bruneian royal family, notably the Dorchester Collection, a group of well-known hotels owned by the sultan in the US and Europe. The sultan, via his BIA that owns the Dorchester Collection hotels, also raised concerns abroad in April 2014 after he implemented a Sharia law penal code. The code included death by stoning, amputation, and flogging for crimes in Brunei that included abortion, adultery, and same-sex relationship acts. None of these were exempted from shariah, regardless of a person's social class, although the law was applied only to acts committed in Brunei itself. When the sultan made his announcement, entertainers such as George Clooney, Elton John, and Ellen DeGeneres called for a boycott of all hotels associated with him.

In protest, a United States national LGBT advocacy organisation, the Gill Action Fund, cancelled its reservation to hold a conference of major donors at The Beverly Hills Hotel and demanded a refund of its deposit. The hotel management responded by issuing a statement asserting that it does not discriminate on the basis of sexual orientation. Fashion designers Brian Atwood and Peter Som subsequently called for wider protests, urging the fashion industry to boycott all of the hotels owned by the Dorchester Collection.

In January 2013, the Royal College of General Practitioners designated the sultan the first companion of the college for services to healthcare in Brunei and abroad. In April 2019, the RCGP withdrew this honour in light of new anti-LGBT laws supported by the sultan which are not aligned with the organisation's values. Due to the international condemnation of the legislation, the Sultan announced that he would extend a moratorium on capital punishment for homosexuality and ratify the United Nations Convention Against Torture.

=== Car collection controversy ===
The sultan is often credited with owning one of the largest private car collections in the world with about 2,500 cars. However, his third brother Jefri Bolkiah is the true owner and overseer. The car collection and Prince Jefri Bolkiah's other indulgences cost billions of US dollars, and ultimately landed him in trouble and the royal family in financial crisis. The car collection was left abandoned; most of the non-garaged cars were beyond saving, the rest were auctioned.

== Philanthropy ==
=== Sultan Haji Hassanal Bolkiah Foundation ===
The Sultan Haji Hassanal Bolkiah Foundation (Yayasan Sultan Haji Hassanal Bolkiah; YSHHB), sometimes referred to as the Yayasan, was founded on 5 October 1992. Hassanal Bolkiah and his family members intended for the foundation to act as a conduit for their philanthropic gifts. Yayasan is guided by five guiding principles: finance, development, welfare, education, and religion.

In a speech on 28 January 2009, Hassanal Bolkiah gave his approval for "The Committee for the Palestinian Humanitarian Fund" to be established. The Palestinian Humanitarian Fund received a $50,000 grant from the Sultan Haji Hassanal Bolkiah Foundation. The gift increased the amount raised to sixty-one thousand dollars. The Foundation's School and the Foundation Building Complex both have donation boxes placed.

At a meeting of the YSHHB Committee of Governors on 2 October 2018, Prince Abdul Malik disclosed that more than $115,000 had been embezzled from the organisation. He mentioned that eight instances of breach of trust involving five employees and a total of $115,528 were filed between 2004 and 2016. The fraud was uncovered after the Prime Minister's Office Audit Department carried out its first audit since the foundation was founded in 1992.

=== Scholarships ===
Hassanal Bolkiah, in his capacity as Supreme Commander of the Royal Brunei Armed Forces (RBAF), has articulated a strategic vision for the development of the nation's leadership. This objective emphasizes the cultivation of advanced leadership competencies to navigate contemporary global socioeconomic and geopolitical transitions. In order to draw and nurture young leaders for Brunei's defence and security industries, the Supreme Commander of the Royal Brunei Armed Forces Scholarship Scheme was established in 2005. It offers tuition at international universities and military schools. Since its establishment, more than fifty Bruneians have been awarded this scholarship, which pays for tuition, living expenses, stipends, and an annual round-trip ticket. In addition to offering a broad range of disciplines, the scholarship recipients represent Brunei abroad as ambassadors.

As a direct result of the Sultan Haji Hassanal Bolkiah Foundation's founding objective, particularly with regard to education, a unique scholarship program called "Sultan's Scholar" has been formed. In 2006, Sultan Hassanal Bolkiah gave his approval for the "Sultan's Scholar" award to be given. The "Sultan's Scholar" Scholarship Scheme was enlarged by the Sultan Haji Hassanal Bolkiah Foundation in 2013 to include recitation up to the Doctor of Philosophy degree.

== Personal life ==
=== Interests ===
Hassanal Bolkiah played polo with then-Prince Charles on 15 July 1996, to commemorate his 50th birthday. He played polo competitively when he was younger, at one point even representing the Indian Army's 61st Cavalry team. He has a history of attending polo matches frequently in recent years, especially since two of his children started playing competitive polo. A friendly polo match between the Brunei team and the 61st Cavalry Indian Army team was also held a few years ago as part of the sultan's 70th birthday celebrations as a tribute to his long friendship with the latter.

On 8 February 2015, Hassanal Bolkiah competed in and won the Richard Mille Gold Cup, a charity polo match held at Padang 1, Royal Brunei Polo and Riding Club (RBPRC) Jerudong, in support of the Children's Cancer Foundation (YASKA). Later on the following day, he led his team to victory in the Richard Mille Exhibition Polo Match. The black team of the monarch defeated the white team 7–5 on the eighth day of the four-team charity competition at the same venue to advance to the final.

Hassanal Bolkiah likes to play badminton and squash.

=== Health ===
In May 2025, Hassanal Bolkiah was hospitalised in Kuala Lumpur, Malaysia for fatigue while attending an ASEAN summit.

On 18 January 2026, Hassanal Bolkiah had undergone a successful 'total knee replacement' surgery at the Jerudong Park Medical Centre in Brunei.

=== Marriages and issue ===
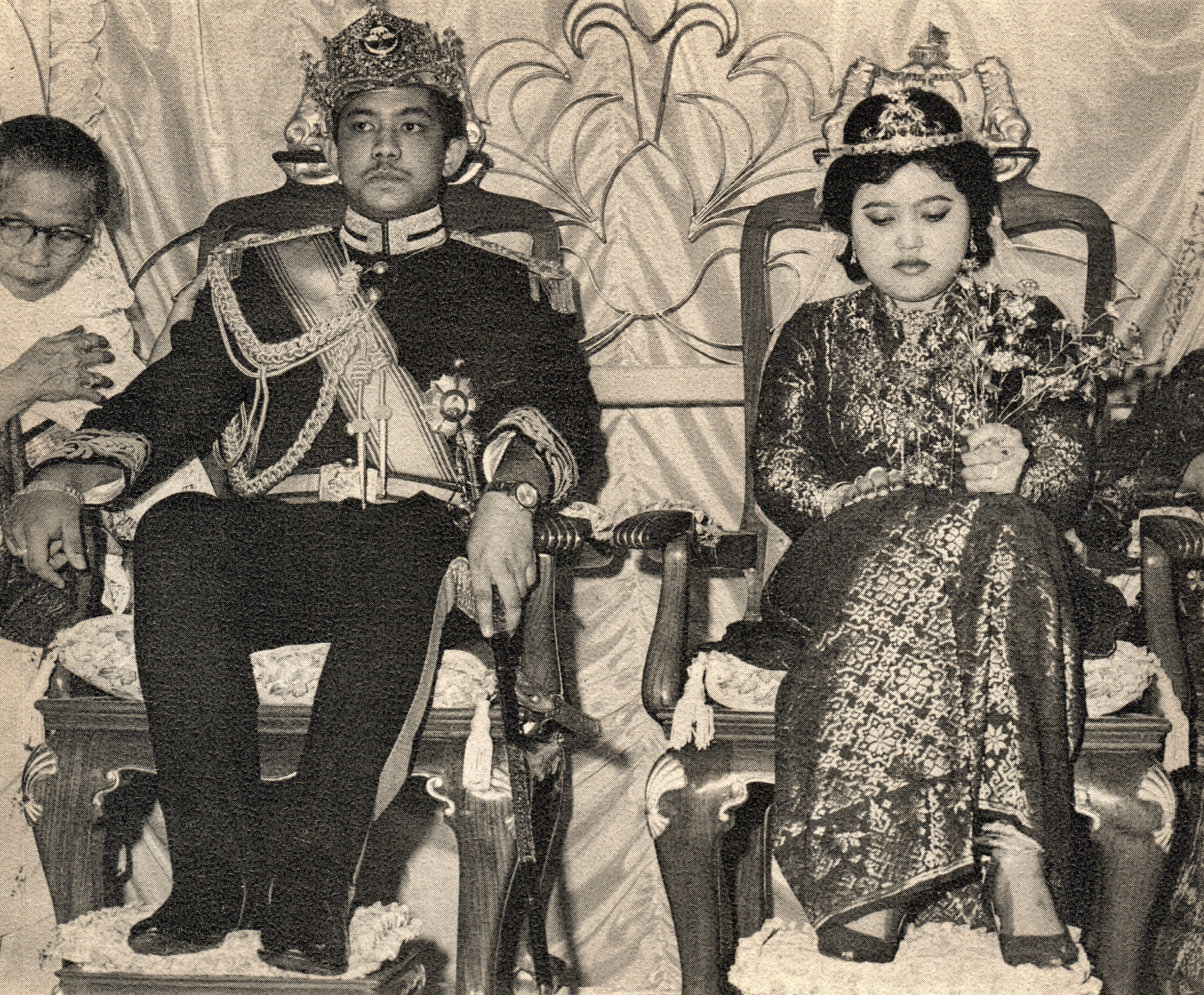
Bersanding ceremony of Prince Hassanal Bolkiah and Pengiran Anak Saleha on 29 July 1965

The sultan married his first cousin and first wife, Pengiran Anak Saleha at Istana Darul Hana on 29 July 1965. He married Mariam Abdul Aziz (formerly titled Duli Yang Teramat Mulia Pengiran Isteri) as his second wife in 1981 when she was an ex-flight attendant for Royal Brunei Airlines. According to Brunei's sharia law, Mariam was stripped of all royal titles in 2003 and the Sultan proclaimed a first-stage divorce from her, according to a statement made by Prince Sufri Bolkiah on state-run television. The Sultan married 33-year-old former Malaysian TV3 anchor Azrinaz Mazhar Hakim (formerly known as Duli Yang Teramat Mulia Pengiran Isteri) in a private wedding held in Kuala Lumpur in August 2005. On 16 June 2010, the Grand Chamberlain announced that the Sultan was divorcing his third wife and would strip her of all royal titles after five years of marriage, citing "special reasons" without further details, following weeks of rumours in the capital. It was also known that he has an adopted daughter named Afifa Abdullah with Mariam.

Prince Al-Muhtadee Billah is the current Pengiran Muda Mahkota (Crown Prince) and the sultan's heir, as the eldest son of the sultan and Raja Isteri Pengiran Anak Saleha. As of 2012, Hassanal Bolkiah has five sons and seven daughters with his three wives. As of 2025, he also has 20 grandchildren.

Name	Birth	Death	Marriage		Children
Name	Birth	Death	Date	Spouse	Children
Raja Isteri Pengiran Anak Hajah Saleha (m. 1965–present)
Pengiran Anak Puteri Hajah Rashidah Sa'adatul Bolkiah	26 July 1969		15 August 1996	Pengiran Maharaja Setia Laila Di-Raja Sahibul Irshad Pengiran Anak Haji 'Abdul Rahim bin Pengiran Indera Mahkota Pengiran Anak Dr. Kemaluddin Al-Haj	Pengiran Anak Raheemah Sanaul Bolkiah
Pengiran Anak Puteri Hajah Rashidah Sa'adatul Bolkiah	26 July 1969		15 August 1996	Pengiran Maharaja Setia Laila Di-Raja Sahibul Irshad Pengiran Anak Haji 'Abdul Rahim bin Pengiran Indera Mahkota Pengiran Anak Dr. Kemaluddin Al-Haj	Pengiran Anak Hariisah Widadul Bolqiah
Pengiran Anak Puteri Hajah Rashidah Sa'adatul Bolkiah	26 July 1969		15 August 1996	Pengiran Maharaja Setia Laila Di-Raja Sahibul Irshad Pengiran Anak Haji 'Abdul Rahim bin Pengiran Indera Mahkota Pengiran Anak Dr. Kemaluddin Al-Haj	Pengiran Anak 'Abdul Raqiib
Pengiran Anak Puteri Hajah Rashidah Sa'adatul Bolkiah	26 July 1969		15 August 1996	Pengiran Maharaja Setia Laila Di-Raja Sahibul Irshad Pengiran Anak Haji 'Abdul Rahim bin Pengiran Indera Mahkota Pengiran Anak Dr. Kemaluddin Al-Haj	Pengiran Anak 'Abdul Haseeb
Pengiran Anak Puteri Hajah Rashidah Sa'adatul Bolkiah	26 July 1969		15 August 1996	Pengiran Maharaja Setia Laila Di-Raja Sahibul Irshad Pengiran Anak Haji 'Abdul Rahim bin Pengiran Indera Mahkota Pengiran Anak Dr. Kemaluddin Al-Haj	Pengiran Anak Raqeeqah Raayatul Bolqiah
Pengiran Anak Puteri Hajah Muta-Wakkilah Hayatul Bolkiah	12 October 1971		None		
Pengiran Muda Mahkota Pengiran Muda Haji Al-Muhtadee Billah	17 February 1974		9 September 2004	Pengiran Anak Isteri Pengiran Anak Sarah binti Pengiran Haji Salleh Ab-Rahaman	Pengiran Muda Abdul Muntaqim
Pengiran Muda Mahkota Pengiran Muda Haji Al-Muhtadee Billah	17 February 1974		9 September 2004	Pengiran Anak Isteri Pengiran Anak Sarah binti Pengiran Haji Salleh Ab-Rahaman	Pengiran Anak Muneerah Madhul Bolkiah
Pengiran Muda Mahkota Pengiran Muda Haji Al-Muhtadee Billah	17 February 1974		9 September 2004	Pengiran Anak Isteri Pengiran Anak Sarah binti Pengiran Haji Salleh Ab-Rahaman	Pengiran Muda Muhammad Aiman
Pengiran Muda Mahkota Pengiran Muda Haji Al-Muhtadee Billah	17 February 1974		9 September 2004	Pengiran Anak Isteri Pengiran Anak Sarah binti Pengiran Haji Salleh Ab-Rahaman	Pengiran Anak Faathimah Az-Zahraa Raihaanul Bolkiah
Pengiran Anak Puteri Hajah Majeedah Nuurul Bolkiah	16 March 1976		10 June 2007; Divorced 7 December 2023	Pengiran Khairul Khalil bin Pengiran Syed Haji Jaafari	Pengiran Anak 'Abdul Hafeez
Pengiran Anak Puteri Hajah Majeedah Nuurul Bolkiah	16 March 1976		10 June 2007; Divorced 7 December 2023	Pengiran Khairul Khalil bin Pengiran Syed Haji Jaafari	Pengiran Anak Raihaanah Hanaa-Ul Bolqiah
Pengiran Anak Puteri Hajah Hafizah Sururul Bolkiah	12 March 1980		20 September 2012	Pengiran Anak Haji Muhammad Ruzaini bin Pengiran Dr. Haji Mohammad Yakub	Pengiran Anak Muhammad Za'eem
Pengiran Anak Puteri Hajah Hafizah Sururul Bolkiah	12 March 1980		20 September 2012	Pengiran Anak Haji Muhammad Ruzaini bin Pengiran Dr. Haji Mohammad Yakub	Pengiran Anak Muhammad 'Aamir
Pengiran Anak Puteri Hajah Hafizah Sururul Bolkiah	12 March 1980		20 September 2012	Pengiran Anak Haji Muhammad Ruzaini bin Pengiran Dr. Haji Mohammad Yakub	Pengiran Anak 'Abdul Hakeem
Pengiran Anak Puteri Hajah Hafizah Sururul Bolkiah	12 March 1980		20 September 2012	Pengiran Anak Haji Muhammad Ruzaini bin Pengiran Dr. Haji Mohammad Yakub	Pengiran Anak 'Abdul Aleem
Pengiran Muda 'Abdul Malik	30 June 1983		9 April 2015	Pengiran Raabi'atul Adawiyyah binti Pengiran Haji Bolkiah	Pengiran Anak Muthee'ah Raayatul Bolqiah
Pengiran Muda 'Abdul Malik	30 June 1983		9 April 2015	Pengiran Raabi'atul Adawiyyah binti Pengiran Haji Bolkiah	Pengiran Anak Fathiyyah Rafaahul Bolqiah
Pengiran Muda 'Abdul Malik	30 June 1983		9 April 2015	Pengiran Raabi'atul Adawiyyah binti Pengiran Haji Bolkiah	Pengiran Anak Khaalishah Mishbaahul Bolqiah
Pengiran Muda 'Abdul Malik	30 June 1983		9 April 2015	Pengiran Raabi'atul Adawiyyah binti Pengiran Haji Bolkiah	Pengiran Anak Nabeelah Najmul Bolqiah
Mariam Abdul Aziz (m. 1981–2003; divorced)
Pengiran Muda Haji 'Abdul 'Azim	29 July 1982	24 October 2020	None		
Pengiran Anak Puteri 'Azemah Ni'matul Bolkiah	26 September 1984		12 January 2023	Pengiran Muda Bahar ibni Pengiran Di-Gadong Sahibul Mal Pengiran Muda Haji Jefri Bolkiah	None
Pengiran Anak Puteri Fadzilah Lubabul Bolkiah	23 August 1985		20 January 2022	Pengiran Suami Abdullah Nabil Mahmoud Al-Hashimi	Pengiran Anak Daniya Rahmatul Bolkiah
Pengiran Muda 'Abdul Mateen	10 August 1991		11 January 2024	Pengiran Anak Isteri Anisha Rosnah binti Adam	Pengiran Anak Zahra Mariam Bolkiah
Azrinaz Mazhar Hakim (m. 2005–2010; divorced)
Pengiran Muda 'Abdul Wakeel	1 June 2006		None		
Pengiran Anak Puteri 'Ameerah Wardatul Bolkiah	28 January 2008		None		

== Titles and styles ==
Styles of The Sultan of Brunei
- Reference style: His Majesty
- Spoken style: Your Majesty
- Alternative style: Kebawah Duli Tuan Patik

=== Full title ===
- 5 October 1967 – present: His Majesty the Sultan Haji Hassanal Bolkiah Mu'izzaddin Waddaulah ibni Al-Marhum Sultan Haji Omar 'Ali Saifuddien Sa'adul Khairi Waddien, Sultan and Yang Di-Pertuan of Negara Brunei Darussalam
  - Malay (Rumi): Kebawah Duli Yang Maha Mulia Paduka Seri Baginda Sultan Haji Hassanal Bolkiah Mu’izzaddin Waddaulah ibni Al-Marhum Sultan Haji Omar ‘Ali Saifuddien Sa’adul Khairi Waddien, Sultan dan Yang Di-Pertuan Negara Brunei Darussalam
  - Malay (Jawi): کباوه دولي يڠ مها موليا ڤادوک سري بݢندا سلطان حاج حسن البلقية معز الدين والدولة ابن المرحوم سلطان حاج عمر علي سيف الدين سعد الخير والدين، سلطان دان يڠ دڤرتوان نݢارا بروني دارالسلام.

== Awards and honours ==
=== Academic honours ===
The sultan received an honorary doctorate at the Moscow State Institute of International Relations (MGIMO), 2005. He previously held an Honorary Doctor of Law degree from the University of Oxford, England, which was returned on 6 May 2019 following a letter from the university (but not revoked), and an Honorary Doctor of Letters degree from the University of Aberdeen, Scotland, which was revoked on 17 April 2019. He received an Honorary Doctorate from the Chulalongkorn University of Thailand. In 2003, he received an Honorary Doctorate Degree in Humanities and Culture from Universitas Gadjah Mada (UGM), Yogyakarta, Indonesia. On 27 January 2005, he was awarded an Honorary Doctor of Laws by the National University of Singapore. On 14 April 2011, he was conferred the Honorary Doctorate of Law by King's College London (KCL). The scroll for the honorary doctorate was presented by Lord Douro, the chairman of the Council of KCL. This honorary doctorate was rescinded on 6 June 2019 by the Fellowships and Hororary Degrees Committee at KCL upon recommendation of the KCL Chairman Christopher Geidt, in light of the Sultan's willingness to inflict death by stoning and other penalties upon homosexuals in Brunei. He was awarded with an honorary doctorate in philosophy and humanities on 21 April 2011 from Universitas Indonesia. On 23 March 2019, he was conferred the Honorary Doctorate Islamic Leadership from Universiti Teknologi MARA (UiTM), Malaysia.

=== Military honours ===
In the British Army, he was made an Honorary Major General in 1984. Queen Elizabeth II appointed Hassanal Bolkiah as an Air Chief Marshal in the Royal Air Force (RAF) in 1992. According to Buckingham Palace, the Queen did not decide whether to give him the honours, as Business Insider was informed. In the Royal Navy, he was appointed Honorary Admiral in 2001.

In April 2008, he was made an honorary member of the Indonesian Satgas Atbara Special Operations Unit. He holds the rank of Honorary Colonel Commandant of Pakistan's Special Service Group (SSG), awarded to him during his visit to the Pakistan Army's SSG headquarters at Cherat with effect from 3 April 2005. He possesses red beret and paratrooper wings of the Black Hawk paratroopers, presented to him by the Indian Army during his state visit to India. On 30 January 2009, he was awarded the Order of Lakandula Grand Collar from President Gloria Macapagal Arroyo of Philippines during his state visit to the country.

== See also ==
- List of sultans of Brunei
- List of Brunei-related topics
- List of current foreign ministers

== Notes ==
Hassanal Bolkiah House of Bolkiah Born: 15 July 1946
Regnal titles
Preceded by Omar Ali Saifuddien III	Sultan of Brunei; 1967–present	Incumbent; Heir apparent: Al-Muhtadee Billah
Bruneian royalty
Preceded by Ahmad Tajuddin	Crown Prince of Brunei; 1965–1967	Succeeded by Al-Muhtadee Billah
Diplomatic posts
Preceded by Jenny Shipley	Chairperson of APEC; 2000	Succeeded by Jiang Zemin
Preceded by Trần Đức Lương	Chairperson of ASEAN; 2001	Succeeded by Hun Sen
Preceded by Hun Sen	Chairperson of ASEAN; 2013	Succeeded by Thein Sein
Preceded by Nguyễn Xuân Phúc	Chairperson of ASEAN; 2021	Next: Hun Sen
Records
Preceded by Bill Gates	Richest Person in the World; 1997	Succeeded by Bill Gates
