= Prince Muhammad Aiman of Brunei =

Bruneian prince (born 2015)

Muhammad Aiman محمد أيمن
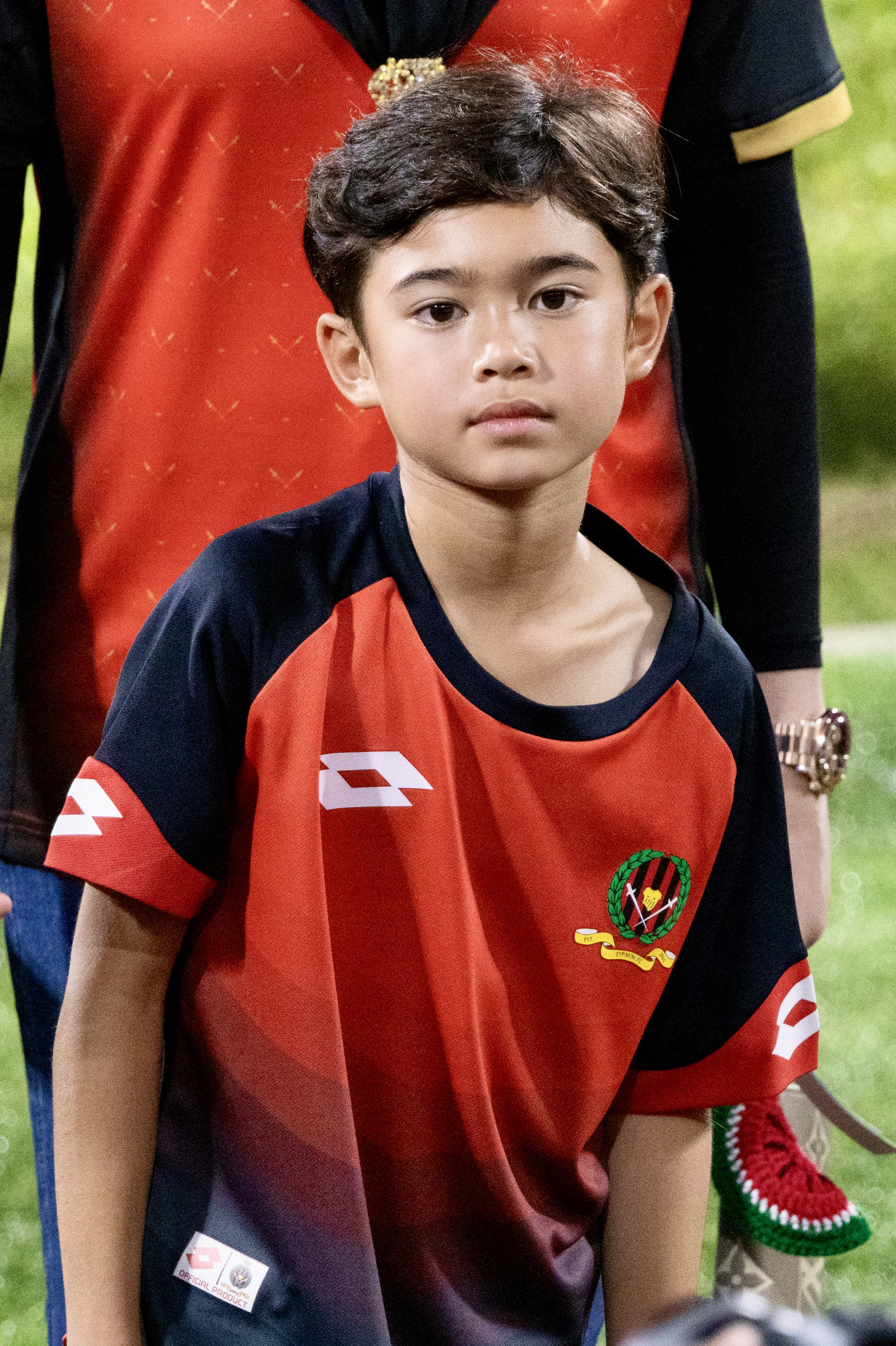
- Muhammad Aiman in 2024
- Born: Muhammad Aiman ibni Al-Muhtadee Billah; 7 June 2015 (age 11); Istana Nurul Iman, Bandar Seri Begawan, Brunei
- House: Bolkiah
- Father: Al-Muhtadee Billah
- Mother: Sarah binti Salleh
- Religion: Sunni Islam

Muhammad Aiman ibni Al-Muhtadee Billah (Jawi: محمد أيمن; born 7 June 2015) is a member of the royal family of Brunei. He is the second son of Crown Prince Al-Muhtadee Billah and Crown Princess Sarah and a grandson of Sultan Hassanal Bolkiah of Brunei. Prince Aiman is third in the line of succession to the Bruneian throne after his father and older brother.

== Early life ==
Prince Aiman was born on 7 June 2015 to Crown Prince Al-Muhtadee Billah and Crown Princess Sarah, at the Istana Nurul Iman in Bandar Seri Begawan, Brunei. He has three siblings: Prince Muntaqim, Princess Muneerah, and Princess Faathimah.

== Education ==
Prince Aiman attends International School Brunei in Bandar Seri Begawan. While at school, he has participated in plays and art exhibitions. Aiman also plays several sports including badminton, football, swimming, and tennis.

== Royal duties ==
Prince Aiman often accompanies his parents on official trips abroad. He has participated during visits to Japan, Malaysia, and Singapore.

Aiman also attends engagements in Brunei such as Chinese New Years open houses movie screenings, and events involving youth.

== Title and style ==
Styles of Prince Muhammad Aiman
- Reference style: Yang Teramat Mulia
- Alternative style: His Royal Highness

His full title and style is Yang Teramat Mulia Pengiran Muda Muhammad Aiman ibni Duli Yang Teramat Mulia Paduka Seri Pengiran Muda Mahkota Pengiran Muda Haji Al-Muhtadee Billah It is usually translated in English as His Royal Highness Prince Muhammad Aiman of Brunei.

Prince Muhammad Aiman of Brunei House of Bolkiah Born: 17 March 2007
Preceded by Abdul Muntaqim	Succession to the Bruneian throne 3rd position	Succeeded by Abdul Malik
