= Sarah, Crown Princess of Brunei =

Consort of the Crown Prince of Brunei (born 1987)

Sarah سارة
- Paduka Seri Pengiran Anak Isteri
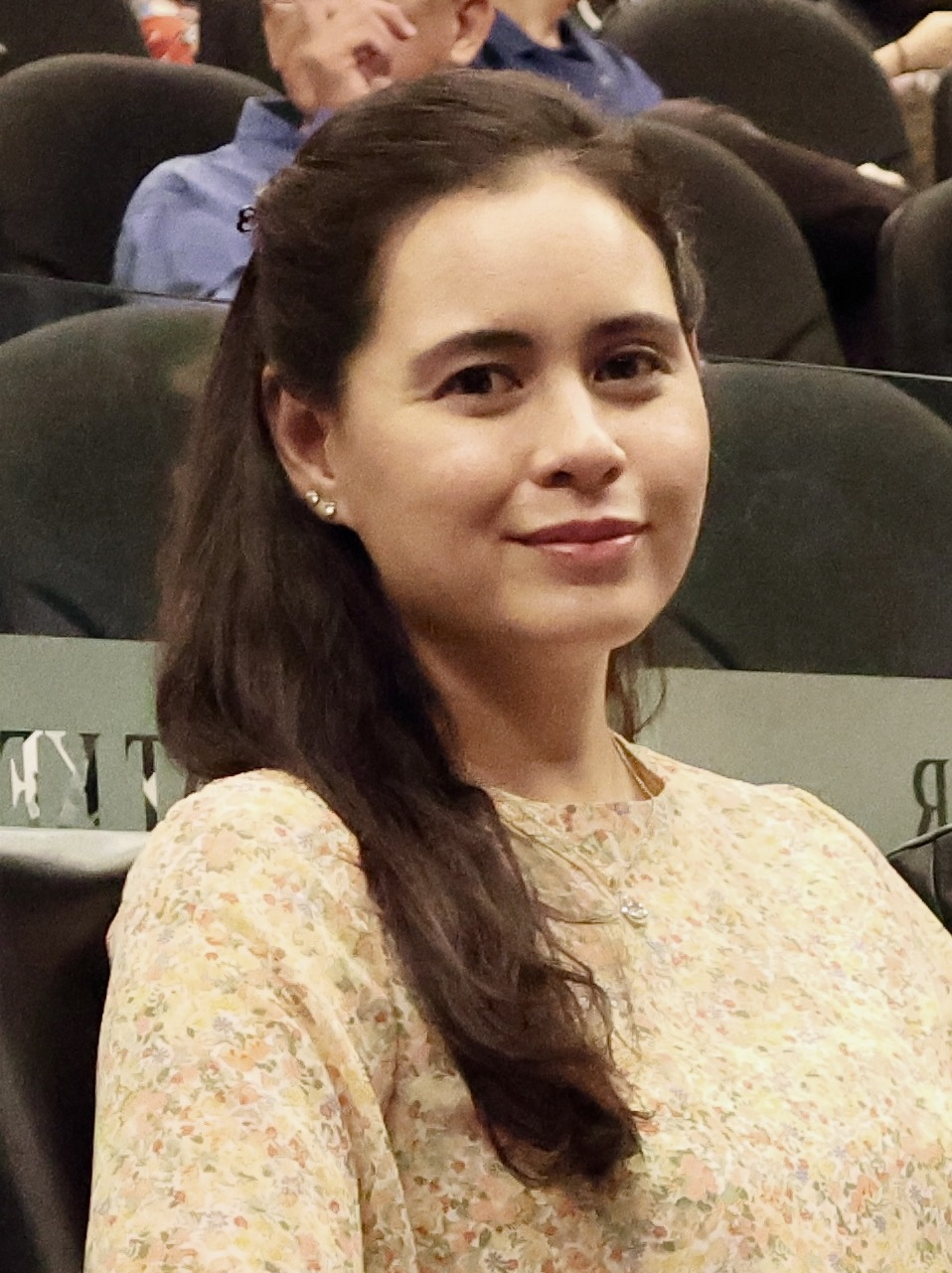
- Princess Sarah in 2024
- Born: Sarah binti Salleh Ab. Rahaman; 9 April 1987 (age 39); Raja Isteri Pengiran Anak Saleha Hospital, Bandar Seri Begawan, Brunei
- Spouse: Al-Muhtadee Billah (m. 2004)
- Issue: Prince Abdul Muntaqim; Princess Muneerah Madhul; Prince Muhammad Aiman; Princess Faathimah
- House: Bolkiah
- Father: Salleh Ab. Rahaman bin Damit
- Mother: Rinawaty Abdullah
- Education: St. Andrew's School; Paduka Seri Begawan Sultan Science College; Universiti Brunei Darussalam

Sarah binti Salleh Ab. Rahaman (Jawi: سارة; born 9 April 1987) is a member of the royal family Brunei. When she was 17 years old she married Crown Prince Al-Muhtadee Billah and together they have four children.

== Early life ==
Sarah was born on 9 April 1987 at Raja Isteri Pengiran Anak Saleha Hospital in Bandar Seri Begawan to Pengiran Salleh Ab. Rahaman bin Pengiran Damit and Rinawaty binti Abdullah née Suzanne Aeby. Her father was born on 1 June 1950 and is a distant member of the royal family. He worked as the chief laboratory assistant at the Water Services Division of the Public Works Department. Her mother was born on 3 March 1954 in Fribourg, Switzerland and worked as a nurse at Raja Isteri Pengiran Anak Saleha Hospital. Her parents met in the United Kingdom in the 1970s while studying. She has two older brothers named Irwan and Adrian.

== Education ==
Sarah attended St. Andrew's School in Bandar Seri Begawan for her primary education and passed her Primary Certificate of Education in 1998.

She then attended Paduka Seri Begawan Sultan Science College for her secondary education and later a pre-university course. She completed her Lower Secondary Assessment in 2002, GCE O Levels in 2003, and A Levels in 2005. In addition to her core subjects, Sarah studied French and participated in basketball and running activities.

In October 2010, Sarah graduated from the Universiti Brunei Darussalam with a Bachelor of Arts degree with first class honours in Public Policy and Administration. She earned the Book Prize for academic excellence in her second, third, and fourth years. She remarked that transitioning from a science background to one in policy and administration was "extremely tough."

While at university, Sarah joined the RBAF Military Cadets of Higher Institutions. During her training she placed third in a cadet pioneer competition and was promoted April 2010. She also played for the university's netball team.

In September 2011, Sarah graduated from Universiti Brunei Darussalam with a Master's degree in Public Policy.

== Marriage ==
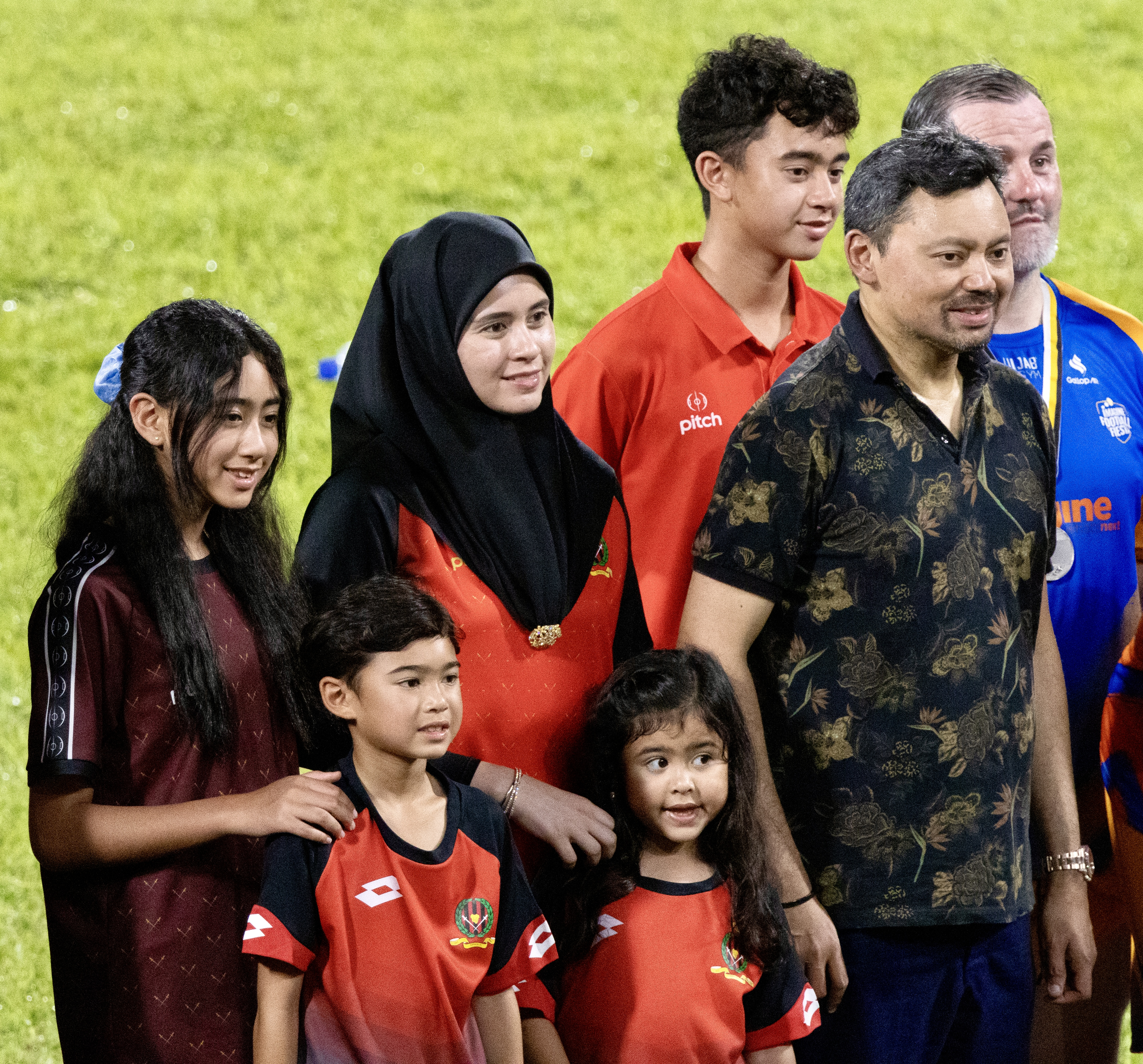
Sarah and Al-Muhtadee Billah with their four children in 2024

On 15 May 2004, the royal court announced the engagement of Sarah and Crown Prince Al-Muhtadee Billah. She was 17 and he was 30 years old. They reportedly met through mutual friends.

Sarah and Al-Muhtadee Billah got married in an elaborate three week celebration from the 24 August to 13 September 2004. The couple where officially married at the Akad Nikah or solemnisation ceremony on the 4th at Omar Ali Saifuddien Mosque. The next day was the Berbedak or powdering ceremony at Istana Nurul Iman where their families applied scented powder and oils to their hands to bless them. On the 8th, Sarah wore a traditional red dress with gold jewelry to the Berinai or henna ceremony. The highpoint of the celebrations was the Bersanding on the 9th which was followed by a procession through the streets of Bandar Seri Begawan in a custom Rolls-Royce. On the 10th was the Majlis Persantapan which was a banquet at Istana Nurul Iman with around 5,000 guests. The main events ended with the Muleh Tiga Hari on the 12th.

Many foreign dignitaries attended the wedding including King Hamad bin Isa of Bahrain, Crown Naruhito Prince of Japan, Prince Richard, Duke of Gloucester, Raja Sirajuddin of Perlis, Prince Bandar bin Sultan Al Saud, Prince Saud bin Faisal Al Saud, and several Malaysian sultans. The wedding was also attended by heads of state and government from Singapore, Thailand, Malaysia, Indonesia, and the Philippines.

=== Issue ===
Crown Prince Al-Muhtadee Billah and Princess Sarah have four children. All of their children have the style of Yang Teramat Mulia which translates to His/Her Royal Highness.

- Pengiran Muda Abdul Muntaqim; born 17 March 2007 at Raja Isteri Pengiran Anak Saleha Hospital
- Pengiran Anak Muneerah Madhul Bolkiah; born 2 January 2011 at Istana Nurul Iman
- Pengiran Muda Muhammad Aiman; born 7 June 2015 at Istana Nurul Iman
- Pengiran Anak Faathimah Az-Zahraa' Raihaanul Bolkiah; born 1 December 2017 at Istana Nurul Iman

== Royal duties ==
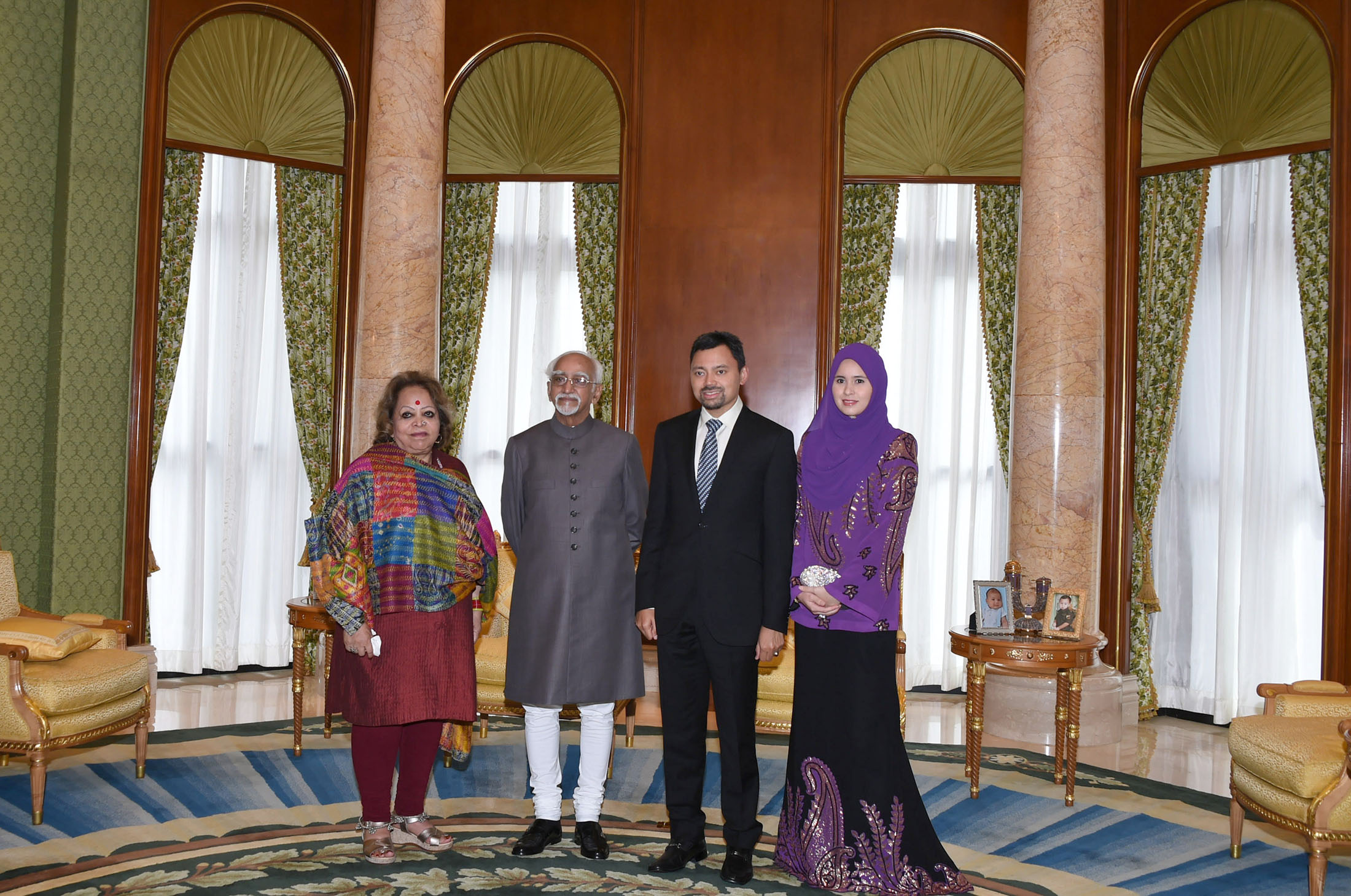
Sarah and Al-Muhtadee Billah meeting with the vice president of India in 2016

Pengiran Anak Sarah has been involved in various charitable causes and community initiatives. At the launch of the Anti-Corruption Bureau's drama Code 486 on 2 April 2006, she emphasised that corruption is a country's internal enemy and urged young people to embrace patriotic ideals and refrain from anti-social behaviours. Her message highlighted the importance of integrity and social responsibility in building a stronger nation. Additionally, at the inauguration of the 6th International School Brunei (ISB) Borneo Global Issues Conference (BGIC) on 1 March 2008, she stressed the significance of young people's involvement in addressing global challenges, particularly environmental issues, and advocated for their active participation in finding solutions to these pressing problems, underscoring their vital role in shaping the future.

On 17 April 2011, Pengiran Anak Sarah participated in UBD's Jogathon 2011, supporting the female student category. On 17 May 2012, during the World Telecommunication and Information Society Day ceremony in Brunei, Pengiran Anak Sarah presented simulated certificates for ICT training to women's associations, aiming to enhance their technological skills, a crucial area for personal and professional growth in the modern world. On 11 May 2013, she presided over the launch of Bank Islam Brunei Darussalam's ALAF program, a corporate social responsibility initiative dedicated to providing education to impoverished and orphaned children in Brunei, reflecting her commitment to supporting underprivileged communities. Pengiran Anak Sarah's dedication to youth development was further demonstrated on 10 March 2017, when she emphasised the importance of investing in young people for a sustainable future. At the 13th ISB BGIC, she highlighted the need for responsible development to address challenges like poverty, inequality, and climate change, while also supporting the development of essential life skills such as communication, negotiation, and global awareness.

On 26 May 2023, Pengiran Anak Sarah visited an exhibition during the opening of the Children's Cancer Foundation centre, where she accepted a drawing from a young cancer survivor, demonstrating her ongoing support for children's health and well-being. In addition to her charitable efforts, she has actively participated in sporting events. On 4 August 2024, she competed in the 5th Borneo Run Half Marathon, racing in the women's open division and covering a distance of 21.18 kilometres, before awarding prizes to the winners. Later, on 3 November 2024, she presented prizes at the VA Run, recognising the winners of the 10 km male and female open categories and supporting Team Peak in placing second in the Corporate 10 km category.

Pengiran Anak Sarah is the royal patron of several organisations, including the Brunei Ladies Golf Association and the ISB BGIC.

== Titles, styles and honours ==
Styles of Princess Sarah
- Reference style: Yang Teramat Mulia
- Alternative style: Her Royal Highness

=== Titles and styles ===
Brunei has a complex system of titles and the royal court does not use English translations of Sarah's title. After marriage, she was given the style of Yang Teramat Mulia which corresponds to Her Royal Highness and the title of Pengiran Anak Isteri which can be translated as Princess consort.

- 9 April 1987 – 9 September 2004: Yang Mulia Dayangku Sarah binti Pengiran Salleh Ab. Rahaman
- 9 September 2004 - present: Yang Teramat Mulia Paduka Seri Pengiran Anak Isteri Pengiran Anak Sarah binti Pengiran Salleh Ab. Rahaman

=== Honours ===
==== National ====
- Order of Laila Utama First Class (DK; 15 July 2005) – Dato Laila Utama

==== Foreign ====
- Jordan:
  - Grand Cordon of the Order of the Star of Jordan (13 May 2008)
- Netherlands:
  - Grand Cross of the Order of the Crown (21 January 2013)
  - Recipient of the King Willem-Alexander Inauguration Medal (30 April 2013)

=== Things named after her ===
- Pengiran Anak Isteri Pengiran Anak Sarah Mosque, a mosque in Kampong Sungai Kelugos.
