= Istana Nurul Iman =

Official residence of the Sultan of Brunei

Coordinates: 4°52′19.31″N 114°55′14.72″E

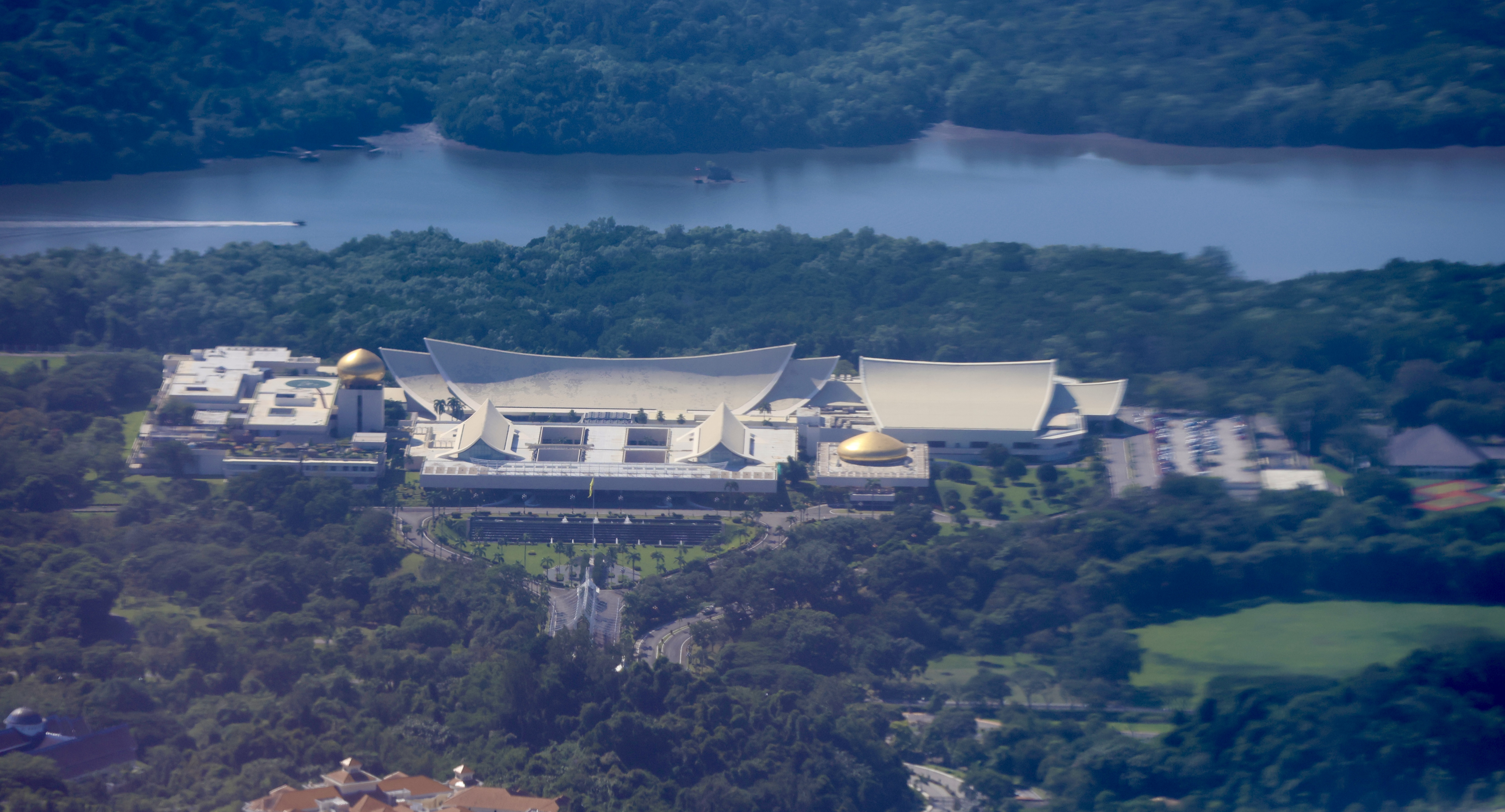
- Aerial photograph of the palace in 2024

General information
- Architectural style: Brunei's Islamic and Malay
- Location: Bandar Seri Begawan, Brunei
- Completed: 1984
- Cost: US$3 Billion (BN$4 Billion)

Technical details
- Structural system: Malay and Islam
- Floor count: Approximate 17 include underground floors
- Floor area: 2,152,782 square feet (200,000 m^{2})

Design and construction
- Architects: Leandro Locsin (overall) and Barbara Allen (interior)

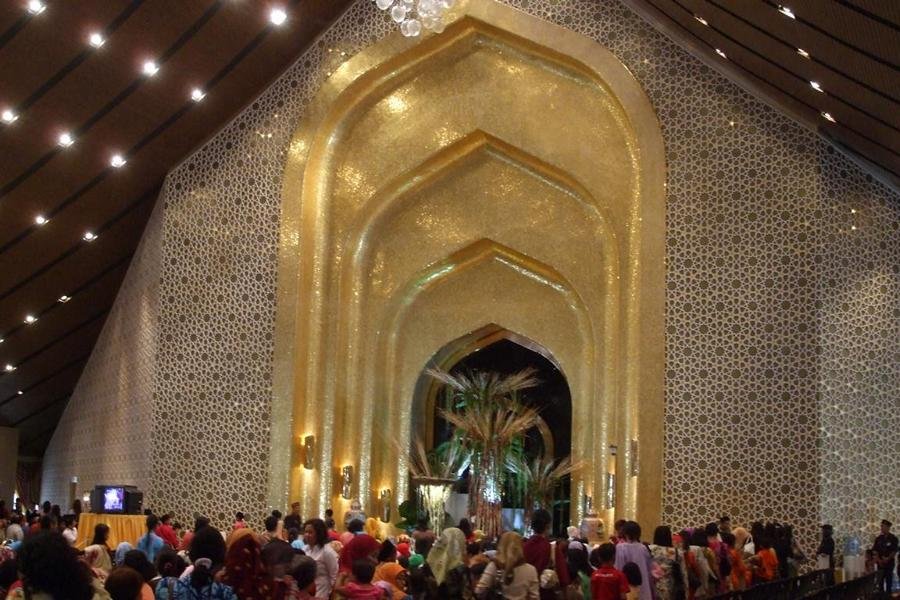
The banquet hall, which can seat up to 5,000 people

The Istana Nurul Iman (Jawi: ايستان نور الإيمان; English: The Light of Faith Palace) is the official residence of the Sultan of Brunei, Hassanal Bolkiah, and the seat of the Brunei government. The palace is located on a leafy, riverside sprawl of hills on the banks of the Brunei River, a few kilometres southwest of Bandar Seri Begawan, Brunei's capital city. The palace is often at the centre of state occasions and royal hospitality.

== Design and construction ==
The name "Istana Nurul Iman" is taken from Malay Istana and Arabic Nur-ul Imaan and means Palace of the Light of Faith. It was designed by Filipino Visayan architect Leandro V. Locsin, who utilized the architectural motif of golden domes and vaulted roofs to echo Brunei's Islamic and Malay influences. The interior of the palace was designed by Dale Keller Interior designers, and the redesigned Royal Wing by Barbara Allen, Construction was handled by Ayala Abbott and Butters, a UK construction firm and shop fitters, Hagen International from Denmark.

The palace had 10,000 people working on it from 17 countries across the globe. It was completed in 1984 at a total cost of around US$1.4 billion.

== World's largest palace ==
The title of the "world's largest palace" is difficult to ascertain, and controversial, as different countries use their own unique standard to claim that their palace is the largest. Using various definitions, a number of palaces are claimed to be the largest: the Forbidden City, the Royal Palace of Madrid, El Escorial, Buckingham Palace, Istana Nurul Iman, Abdeen Palace, Stockholm Palace, the Palace of Versailles, the Royal Palace of Caserta, the Winter Palace, the Louvre Palace, Quirinal Palace, Prague Castle, the Grand Palace and the Palace of the Parliament.

To be considered for the Guinness World Record, the palace must have been intended for use as a royal residence, and only the combined area of the palace's indoor floors (a measurement commonly known as floorspace) is considered. As measured by these standards, Guinness World Records currently considers Istana Nurul Iman to hold the title as the "world's largest residential palace." Upon completion, Istana Nurul Iman became the largest residential palace in the world and the largest single-family residence ever built. The palace contains 1,788 rooms, which includes 257 bathrooms, a banquet hall that can be expanded to accommodate up to 5,000 guests, and a mosque accommodating 1,500 people. The palace also includes 110 garages for 7,000 cars, an air conditioned stable for the Sultan's 200 polo ponies, and five swimming pools. In total, Istana Nurul Iman contains 2,152,782 square feet (200,000 m^{2}) of floorspace. Istana Nurul Iman has 564 chandeliers, 51,000 light bulbs, 44 stairwells and 18 elevators.

== Functions ==
The Sultan takes his official audiences at the palace. The palace is also used for all the state functions of the government of Brunei. In addition, the palace houses the prime minister's office, and serves as the seat of the Brunei government.

In addition to audience and state rooms, there is a throne chamber used for various formal occasions such as the proclamation of the crown prince and the annual birthday investiture.

However, in keeping with its primary use as the Sultan's personal residence, the palace is the home to the Sultan's 7,000 cars in 110 separate garages. The cars are valued at around $5 billion.

== Accessibility ==
The palace is not open to the public except on the annual Islamic celebration of Eid-ul-Fitr (the festival at the end of the Muslim fasting month) when the palace receives about 110,000 visitors over a three-day period where the guests receive gifts of food as well as green packets containing money for young children. The palace is also open to Muslims during 10 days of the Ramadhan period for Tadarus and Tarawih prayer gathering.

== See also ==
- Politics of Brunei
- Bandar Seri Begawan
