= Abdullah Al-Hashimi =

Bruneian prince from Iraq

Abdullah Al-Hashimi عبدالله الهاشمي
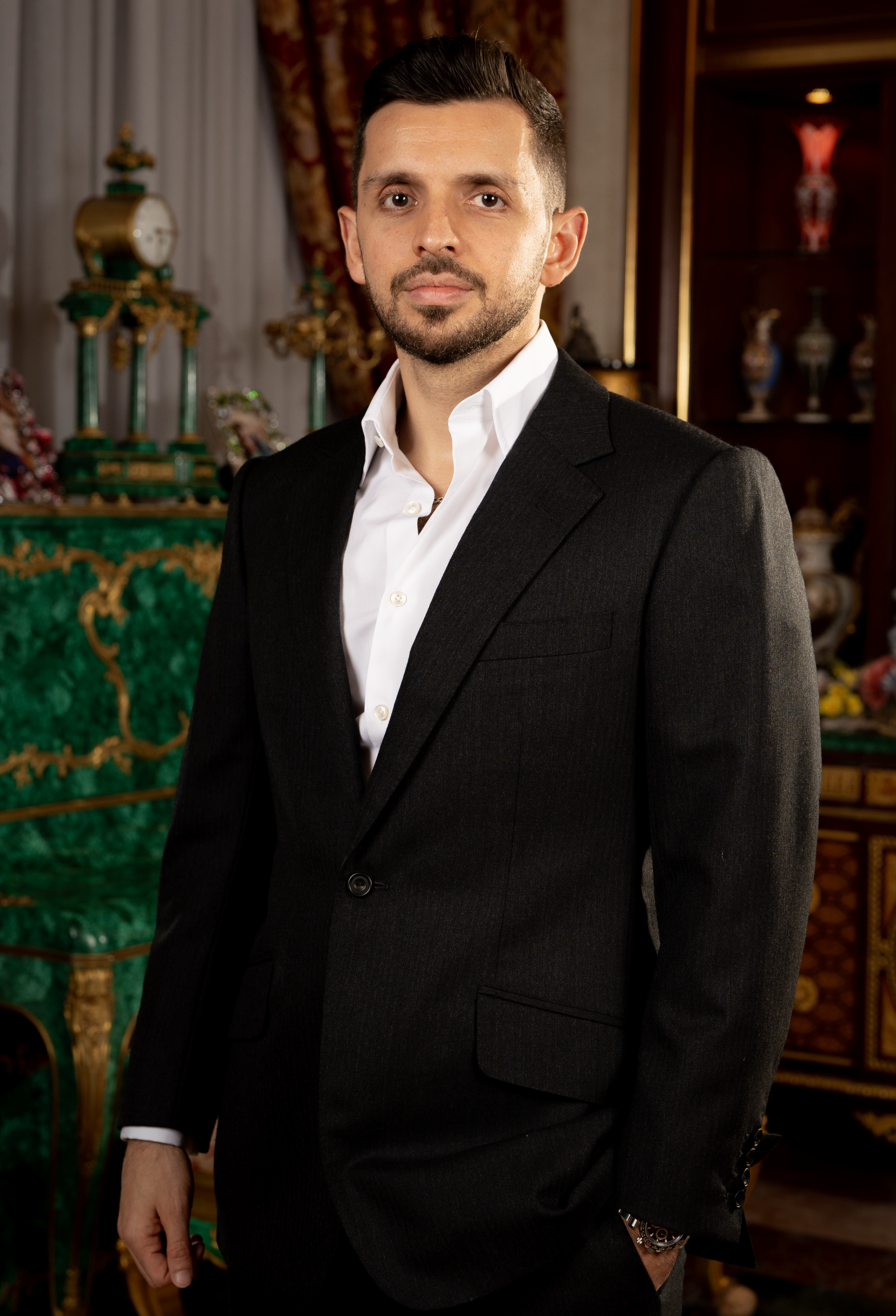
- Abdullah in 2022
- Born: Abdullah ibn Nabil Mahmoud Al-Hashimi; 11 March 1989 (age 37); Mosul, Iraq
- Spouse: Princess Fadzilah Lubabul Bolkiah (m. 2022)
- Issue: Princess Daniya Rahmatul Bolkiah
- House: Bolkiah (by marriage)
- Father: Nabil Mahmoud ibn Abdulkadir Al-Hashimi
- Mother: Hana binti Mohamed Yonis
- Religion: Sunni Islam
- Occupation: Entrepreneur

Abdullah ibn Nabil Mahmoud Al-Hashimi (Jawi: عبدالله بن نبيل محمود الهاشمي; born 11 March 1989) is a member of the royal family of Brunei as the husband of Princess Fadzilah Lubabul Bolkiah, a daughter of Sultan Hassanal Bolkiah of Brunei.

== Early life ==
Abdullah was born on 11 March 1989 in Iraq to Dr. Nabil Mahmoud ibn Abdulkadir Al-Hashimi and Hana binti Mohamed Yonis. His father is a university professor that formerly taught at the University of Mosul's College of Engineering. The family moved to Canada in the early 1990s and Abdullah has Canadian citizenship. They later settled in Brunei where his father became a professor at the University of Brunei.

== Education and career ==
On 9 June 2013, Abdullah was awarded his degree in Bachelor of Business Administration with honours in accounting from Mount Royal University in Calgary. He later qualified as a Chartered Accountant at BPP University in London.

In March 2016, he founded Roasted Sip, a chain of coffee shops in Brunei. They currently have six branches in Jerudong, Kiulap, Pusat Bandar, Serusop, Seria, and the Brunei International Airport.

== Marriage and issue ==
On 31 December 2021, the royal court announced that Abdullah was engaged to Princess Fadzilah Lubabul Bolkiah, daughter of Sultan Hassanal Bolkiah of Brunei. It is not known how long the couple have been in a relationship but he has been friends with her brother, Prince Mateen, since at least 2012.

In January 2022, Princess Fadzilah and Abdullah married in a ten-day celebration from the 16th to the 25th. The Majlis Istiadat Berbedak Pengantin Diraja or powdering ceremony was held on the 19th at Istana Nurul Iman. Fadzilah and Abdullah wore traditional red outfits and their families applied scented powder and oils to their hands to bless them. The next day was the Majlis Istiadat Akad Nikah Diraja or solemnisation ceremony at Omar Ali Saifuddien Mosque where they were officially married. The Majlis Bersanding Pengantin Diraja was on the 23rd. They wore matching white outfits with blue details. The last big event was the Majlis Persantapan Diraja which was a large banquet at Istana Nurul Iman on the 24th. The couple again wore matching outfits this time in blue-gray. All of the couple's wedding outfits were designed by Bernard Chandran.

On 2 October 2024, Princess Fadzilah gave birth to their daughter at Portland Hospital in London, United Kingdom. Her full name and title is Yang Amat Mulia Pengiran Anak Daniya Rahmatul Bolkiah binti Pengiran Suami Abdullah Al-Hashimi.

== Royal duties ==
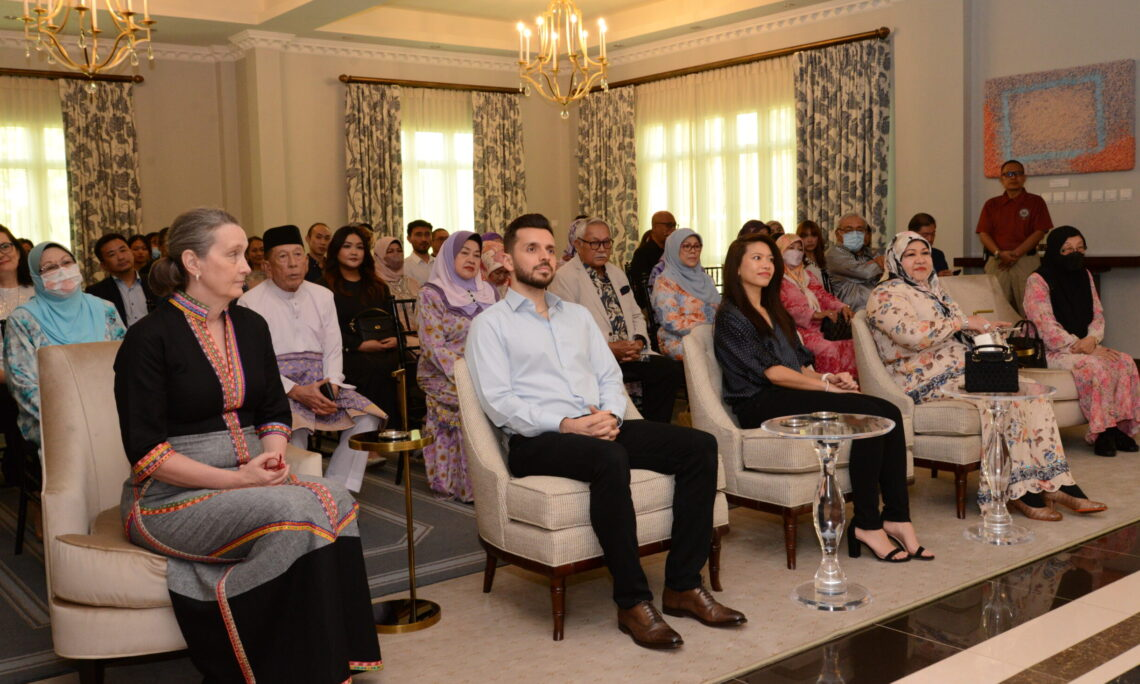
Abdullah and Fadzilah at a charity auction in 2022

Abdullah does not undertake royal duties himself but sometimes accompanies his wife to events. On 23 July 2022, he attended the presentation of earnings from the documentary 'Prince Azim: Son of the Arts' to four of the late Prince Azim's favorite charities. On 30 November 2022, he attended a charity auction hosted by the United States Embassy in Brunei with the funds going to Pusat Ehsan, a special needs charity founded by his mother-in-law, Mariam Abdul Aziz.

== Title and style ==
Styles of Abdullah Al-Hashimi
- Reference style: Yang Amat Mulia
- Alternative style: His Highness

Abdullah was bestowed the style of Yang Amat Mulia and the title of Pengiran Suami by the Sultan of Brunei in conjunction with his wedding in January 2022.

- 11 March 1989 – 23 January 2022: Yang Mulia Awang Abdullah ibn Nabil Mahmoud Al-Hashimi
- 23 January 2022 – present: Yang Amat Mulia Pengiran Suami Abdullah ibn Nabil Mahmoud Al-Hashimi
