= Princess Hafizah Sururul Bolkiah =

Bruneian princess (born 1980)

Hafizah Sururul Bolkiah
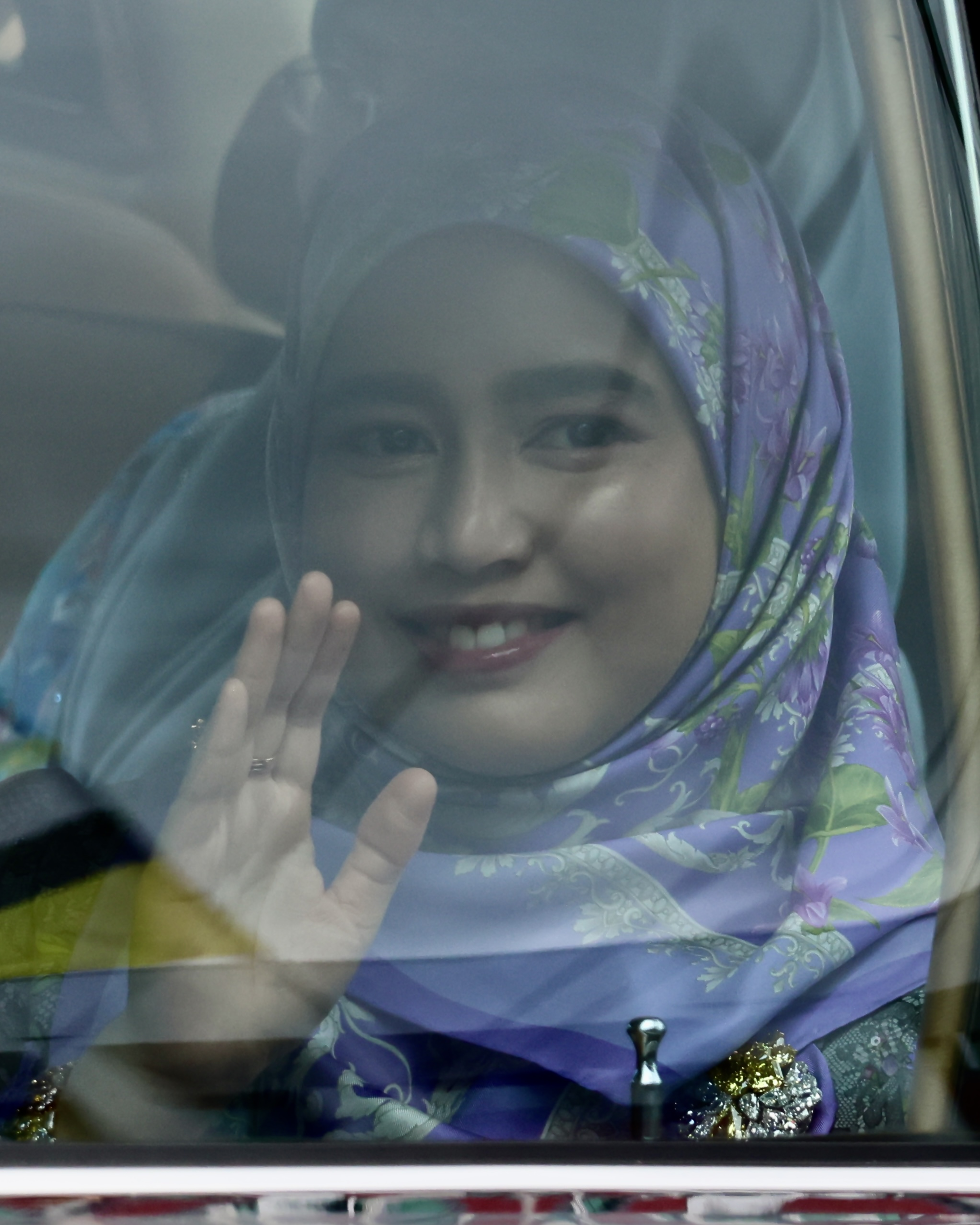
- Hafizah in 2024
- Born: Hafizah Sururul Bolkiah binti Hassanal Bolkiah Mu'izzaddin Waddaulah; 12 March 1980 (age 46); Bandar Seri Begawan, Brunei
- Spouse: Muhammad Ruzaini ibn Mohd Yakub (m. 2012)
- Issue: Muhammad Za'eem; Muhammad Aamir; Abdul Hakeem; Abdul Aleem
- House: Bolkiah
- Father: Hassanal Bolkiah
- Mother: Saleha binti Mohamed Alam
- Religion: Sunni Islam
- Education: Universiti Brunei Darussalam

Hafizah Sururul Bolkiah binti Hassanal Bolkiah (Jawi: حفيظة سرور البلقية; born 12 March 1980) is a member of the royal family of Brunei. She is the fifth child of Sultan Hassanal Bolkiah of Brunei and Queen Saleha.

== Early life ==
Princess Hafizah was born on 12 March 1980 to Sultan Hassanal Bolkiah of Brunei and his first wife, Queen Saleha of Brunei. She has five full siblings and six half-siblings from her father's other marriages.

== Education and career ==
Princess Hafizah attended International School Brunei from 1984 to 1990 when she passed the Primary Certificate of Education. She continued her education at Paduka Seri Begawan Sultan Science College. In 1993, she passed the Brunei Junior Certificate of Education and in June 1995 she completed the GCE O-level exams. Hafizah then attended Duli Pengiran Muda Al-Muhtadee Billah College where she completed the GCE A-level.

On 21 March 1996, Hafizah took part in a Khatam Al-Quran Ceremony at Istana Nurul Iman with her sisters, Princess Majeedah and Princess Azemah marking the completion of their recitation of the Quran.

In September 2002, Hafizah graduated with a Bachelor of Business Administration with second-class upper honours from the Universiti Brunei Darussalam. After graduation, Hafizah began working at the Ministry of Finance

== Marriage and issue ==
In September 2012, Princess Hafizah married Pengiran Anak Muhammad Ruzaini ibn Mohd Yakub in an elaborate celebration lasting over a week.

The Majlis Istiadat Berbedak Pengantin Diraja or powdering ceremony was held on the 19th at Istana Nurul Iman. Hafizah and Ruzaini's families applied scented powder and oils to their hands to bless them. The next day was the Majlis Istiadat Akad Nikah Diraja or solemnisation ceremony at Omar Ali Saifuddien Mosque where they were officially married. The Majlis Bersanding Pengantin Diraja and Majlis Persantapan Diraja which was a large banquet at Istana Nurul Iman on the 23rd.

Foreign dignitaries at the wedding included Yingluck Shinawatra, Benigno Aquino III, Hun Sen, K. Shanmugam, Musa Aman, and Abdul Taib Mahmud.

Hafizah and Ruzaini have four sons.

Name	Born	Age
Y.A.M. Pengiran Anak Muhammad Za'eem	3 August 2013	13 years, 3 months and 2 days
Y.A.M. Pengiran Anak Muhammad Aamir	13 February 2015	11 years, 8 months and 23 days
Y.A.M. Pengiran Anak Abdul Hakeem	19 February 2018	8 years, 8 months and 17 days
Y.A.M. Pengiran Anak Abdul Aleem	22 May 2020	6 years, 5 months and 14 days

== Royal duties ==
From 2008 to 2011, Princess Hafizah distributed Korban sacrificial meat during Hari Raya Aidiladha on behalf of the Ministry of Finance.

Princess Hafizah is the president of the Girl Guides Association of Brunei Darussalam.

== Titles, styles, and honours ==
Styles of Princess Hafizah
- Reference style: Yang Teramat Mulia
- Alternative style: Her Royal Highness

=== Title and style ===
Her full title and style is Yang Teramat Mulia Paduka Seri Pengiran Anak Puteri Hafizah Sururul Bolkiah binti Kebawah Duli Yang Maha Mulia Paduka Seri Baginda Sultan Hassanal Bolkiah Mu'izzaddin Wad'daulah It is usually translated in English as Her Royal Highness Princess Hafizah of Brunei.

=== Honours ===
- Order of the Crown of Brunei (DKMB)
- Hassanal Bolkiah Sultan Medal (PHBS)
- Sultan of Brunei Silver Jubilee Medal (5 October 1992)
- Sultan of Brunei Golden Jubilee Medal (5 October 2017)
- Proclamation of Independence Medal (1 January 1984)

=== Namesakes ===
- Pengiran Anak Puteri Hafizah Sururul Bolkiah Religious School, a religious school in Kampong Jaya Setia.
