= Princess Fadzilah Lubabul Bolkiah =

Bruneian princess (born 1985)

Fadzilah Lubabul Bolkiah
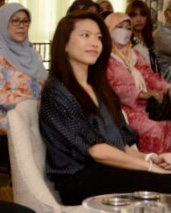
- Fadzilah in 2022
- Born: Fadzilah Lubabul Bolkiah binti Hassanal Bolkiah Mu'izzaddin Waddaulah; 23 August 1985 (age 41); Bandar Seri Begawan, Brunei
- Spouse: Abdullah Al-Hashimi (m. 2022)
- Issue: Princess Daniya Rahmatul Bolkiah
- House: Bolkiah
- Father: Hassanal Bolkiah
- Mother: Mariam Abdul Aziz
- Religion: Sunni Islam
- Education: Kingston University; Hult International Business School; Sports career
- Country: Brunei
- Sport: Netball
Medal record
Netball
Representing Brunei
SEA Games
Bronze medal – third place	2019 Santa Rosa	Women's tournament

Fadzilah Lubabul Bolkiah binti Hassanal Bolkiah (Note: (Jawi script: فضيلة لباب البلقية)) (born 23 August 1985) is a member of the royal family of Brunei. She is the ninth child of Sultan Hassanal Bolkiah of Brunei by his former second wife, Mariam Abdul Aziz.

== Early life ==
Princess Fadzilah was born on 23 August 1985 to Sultan Hassanal Bolkiah of Brunei and his second wife, Mariam Abdul Aziz. Her parents divorced in 2003. She has three full siblings: Prince Azim, Princess Azemah, and Prince Mateen along with eight half siblings from her father's other marriages.

Fadzilah was raised and continues to reside at Istana Nurul Izzah in Kampong Jerudong, Brunei. The palace was built in the mid-1980s for the then Princess Consort Mariam and her children.

== Education ==
On 9 January 2008, Princess Fadzilah graduated with honours from Kingston University in London, UK, with a Bachelors Degree in International Relations. The next year, on 19 January 2009, she earned a Masters Degree (MSc) with honours also in International Relations from Kingston University.

In 2015, she earned a Master of Business Administration (MBA) from Hult International Business School

== Marriage and issue ==
On 31 December 2021, the royal court announced that Princess Fadzilah was engaged to Abdullah Al-Hashimi. It is not known how long the couple have been in a relationship but Abdullah has been friends with her brother, Prince Mateen, since at least 2012.

In January 2022, Princess Fadzilah and Abdullah married in a ten day celebration from the 16th to the 25th. The Majlis Istiadat Berbedak Pengantin Diraja or powdering ceremony was held on the 19th at Istana Nurul Iman. Fadzilah and Abdullah wore traditional red outfits and their families applied scented powder and oils to their hands to bless them. The next day was the Majlis Istiadat Akad Nikah Diraja or solemnisation ceremony at Omar Ali Saifuddien Mosque where they were officially married. The Majlis Bersanding Pengantin Diraja was on the 23rd. They wore matching white outfits with blue details and Princess Fadzilah wore a diamond tiara borrowed from Queen Saleha. The last big event was the Majlis Persantapan Diraja which was a large banquet at Istana Nurul Iman on the 24th. The couple again wore matching outfits this time in blue-gray with Princess Fadzilah wearing a diamond and emerald tiara borrowed from Queen Saleha. All of Princess Fadzilah's wedding dresses were designed by Bernard Chandran.

On 2 October 2024, Princess Fadzilah gave birth to a daughter at Portland Hospital in London, United Kingdom. Her full name and title is Yang Amat Mulia Pengiran Anak Daniya Rahmatul Bolkiah binti Pengiran Suami Abdullah Al-Hashimi.

== Sports career ==
She has been nicknamed 'Fadz' by her teammates in the netball national team and sometimes referred to as the 'Sporty Princess' by the media.

As the national team's official prior to the 29th Southeast Asian (SEA) Games in Kuala Lumpur, she praised the efforts put into preparations and progress. Fad made her national team debut as a WA in the 2018 Asian Netball Championship, where the team concluded the tournament in the 8th place. On 14 April 2019, she and Rocketeers team emerged champions of the President's Cup Netball Tournament held at the Multi-Purpose Hall of the Hassanal Bolkiah National Sports Complex.

She captained the national netball team and took part in the 2019 Southeast Asian Games which was held in Laguna, Philippines. They returned from the tournament with bronze medals with Prince Sufri Bolkiah as the awardee. After the team's bronze win, she alongside her team received cash incentive through the government's Sports Excellence Incentive Scheme.

== Royal duties ==
Princess Fadzilah regularly attends public and private celebrations around the country.

== Titles, style and honours ==
Styles of Princess Fadzilah
- Reference style: Yang Teramat Mulia
- Alternative style: Her Royal Highness

=== Title and style ===
Her full title and style is Yang Teramat Mulia Paduka Seri Pengiran Anak Puteri Fadzilah Lubabul Bolkiah binti Kebawah Duli Yang Maha Mulia Paduka Seri Baginda Sultan Haji Hassanal Bolkiah Mu'izzaddin Wad'daulah It is usually translated in English as Her Royal Highness Princess Fadzilah of Brunei.

=== Honours ===
==== National ====
- Royal Family Order of the Crown of Brunei (DKMB)
- Sultan Hassanal Bolkiah Medal (PHBS)
- National Day Silver Jubilee Medal (23 February 2009)
- Sultan of Brunei Golden Jubilee Medal (5 October 2017)
- Sultan of Brunei Silver Jubilee Medal (5 October 1992)

==== Foreign ====
- Thailand :
  - Dame Grand Cross of the Order of the White Elephant (MPCh (GCE); 26 August 2002)

=== Namesakes ===
- Pengiran Anak Puteri Fadzilah Lubabul Bolkiah Religious School, a religious school in Kampong Kupang.
