= Princess Azemah Ni'matul Bolkiah =

Bruneian princess (born 1984)

Azemah Ni'matul Bolkiah
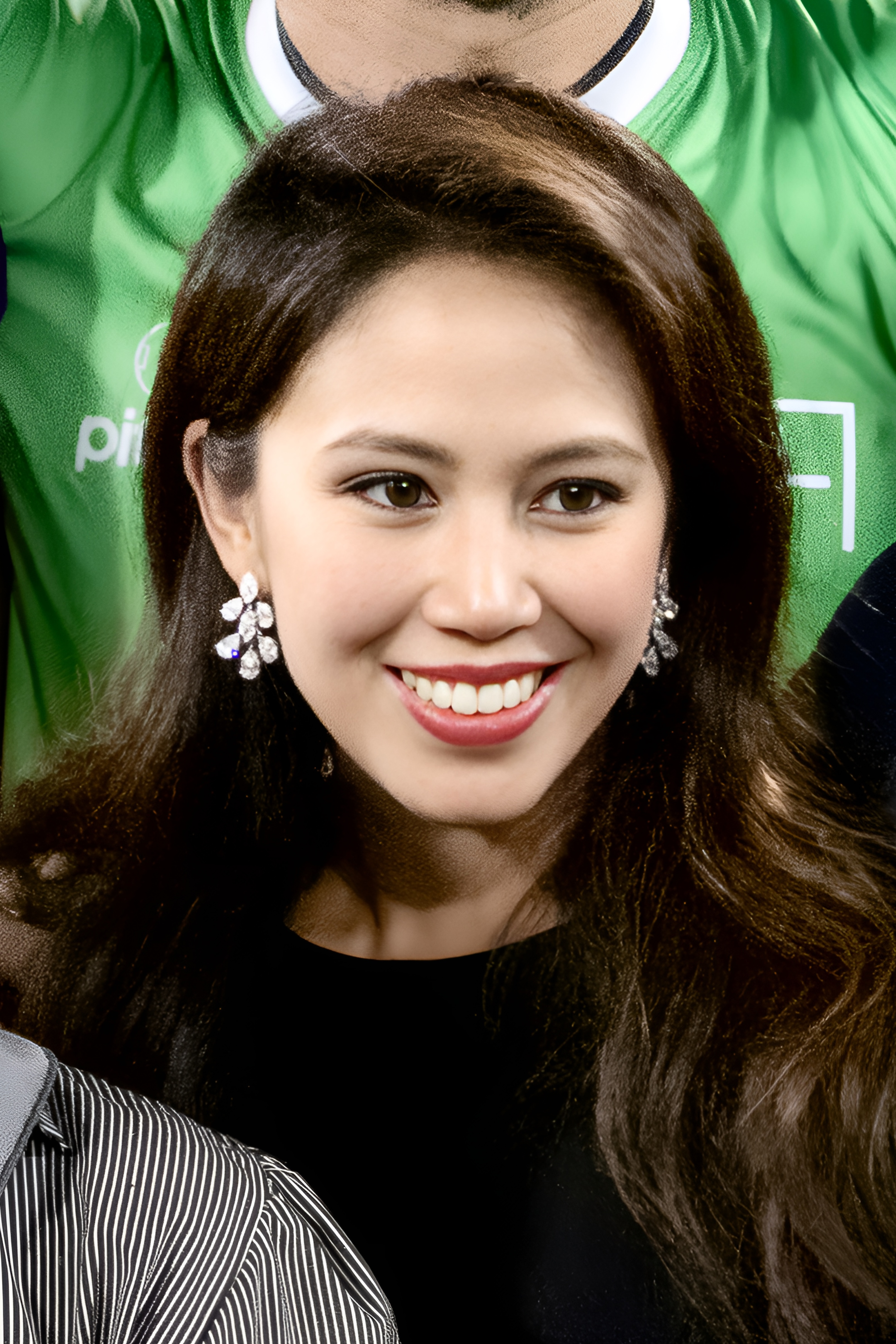
- Azemah in 2024
- Born: 'Azemah Ni'matul Bolkiah binti Hassanal Bolkiah Mu'izzaddin Waddaulah; 26 September 1984 (age 42); Bandar Seri Begawan, Brunei
- Spouse: Bahar Jefri Bolkiah (m. 2023)
- House: Bolkiah
- Father: Hassanal Bolkiah
- Mother: Mariam Abdul Aziz
- Religion: Sunni Islam
- Sports career
- Country: Brunei
- Sport: Polo
Medal record
SEA Games
Bronze medal – third place	2017 Kuala Lumpur	Polo tournament
Bronze medal – third place	2019 Calatagan	Polo tournament
Silver medal – second place	2025 Bangkok	Mixed 2-4 Goals
Bronze medal – third place	2025 Bangkok	Mixed 4-6 Goals

Azemah Ni'matul Bolkiah binti Hassanal Bolkiah (Jawi: عظيمة نعمة البلقية; born 26 September 1984) is a member of the royal family of Brunei. She is the eighth child of Sultan Hassanal Bolkiah of Brunei by his former second wife, Mariam Abdul Aziz.

== Early life ==
Princess Azemah was born on 26 September 1984 to Sultan Hassanal Bolkiah of Brunei and his second wife, Mariam Abdul Aziz. She has three full siblings: Prince Azim, Princess Fadzilah, and Prince Mateen along with eight half siblings from her father's other marriages.

Her parents divorced in February 2003. Shortly after, Princess Azemah wrote into the BruDirect Have Your Say section criticizing people online spreading rumors about the reason for the divorce. "We can take your views but those cruel and heartless comments are tearing me and my brother apart because you are talking about our parents."

Azemah was raised and continues to reside at Istana Nurul Izzah in Kampong Jerudong, Brunei. The palace was built in the mid-1980s for the then Princess Consort Mariam and her children.

== Education ==
Princess Azemah studied at St. Andrew's School in Bandar Seri Begawan, Brunei. In July 2008, she graduated from the University of Warwick in Coventry, United Kingdom with a Bachelor of Laws degree with honors.

Azemah also has two master's degrees. In July 2011, she received a Master of Arts degree in Global Media and Post-national Communications from the School of Oriental and African Studies, University of London and in January 2014, she received a Master of Arts degree in Geopolitics, Territory, and Security from King's College London.

== Marriage ==
On 4 November 2022, the royal court announced the engagement of Princess Azemah and her first cousin, Prince Bahar ibni Jefri Bolkiah. The couple had been dating for several years and in 2018 they opened an indoor cycling gym called Shine Cycle together.

In January 2023, Azemah and Bahar married in a ten day celebration from the 8th to the 17th. The Majlis Istiadat Berbedak Pengantin Diraja or powdering ceremony was held on the 11th at Istana Nurul Iman. Azemah and Bahar wore traditional red outfits and their families applied scented powder and oils to their hands to bless them. The next day was the Majlis Istiadat Akad Nikah Diraja or solemnisation ceremony at Omar Ali Saifuddien Mosque where they were officially married. The Majlis Bersanding Pengantin Diraja was on the 15th. The last big event was the Majlis Persantapan Diraja which was a large banquet at Istana Nurul Iman on the 16th. All of the couple's wedding outfits were designed by Bernard Chandran and Princess Azemah wore jewelry including two diamond tiaras loaned from Queen Saleha.

== Sports career ==
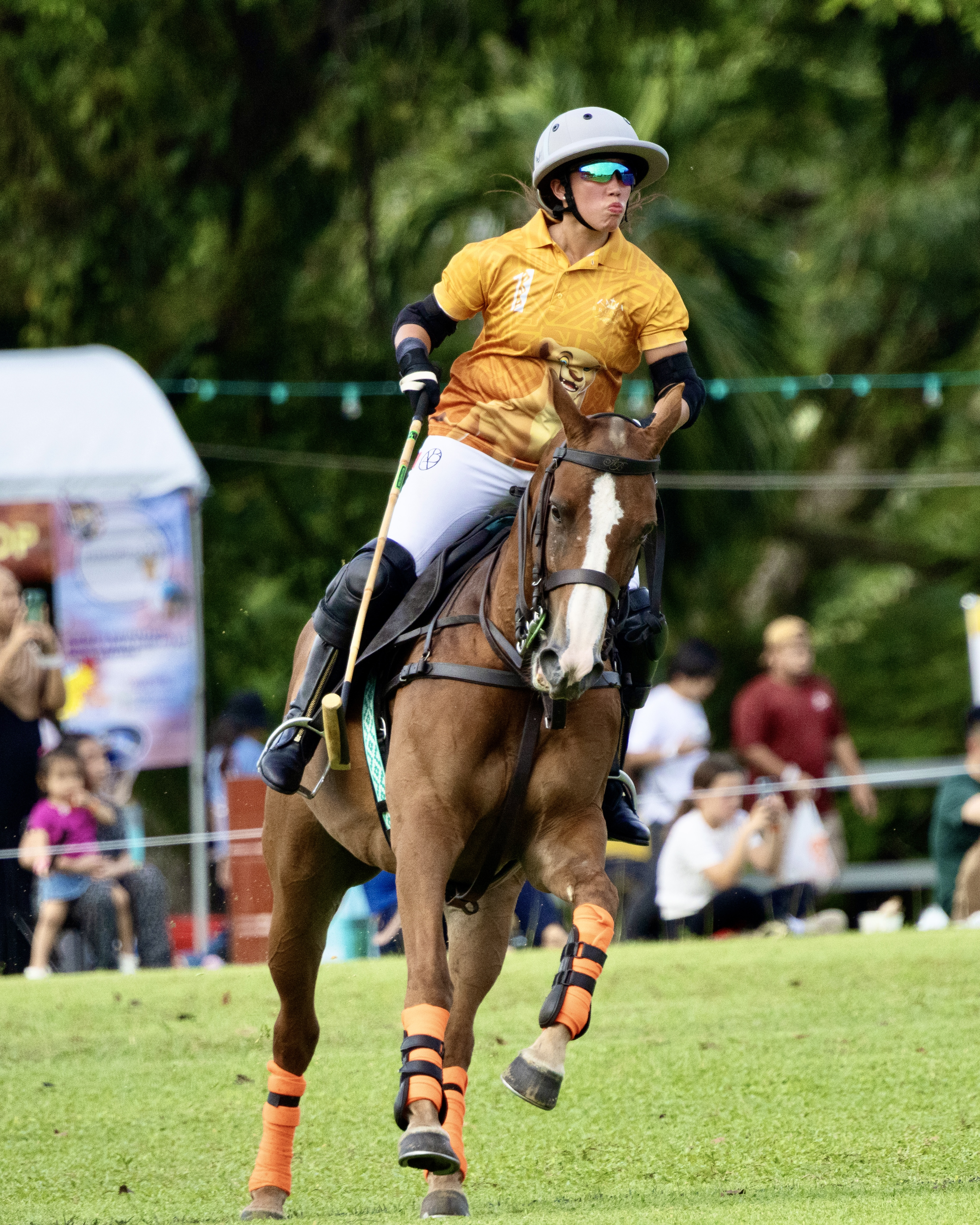
Azemah playing a charity polo exhibition match in 2024

Princess Azemah is an avid polo player along with many other members of the Bruneian royal family. She began riding at four years old and did show jumping when she was young but did start polo until she was student at the University of Warwick. She is coached by Castagnola Marianela.

Polo uses mixed gender teams but the sport is still primarily played by men. Princess Azemah hopes to encourage other women to play polo. “Sport has an incredible influence and impact on communities and individuals. You learn to be disciplined and focused. You learn how to win and lose gracefully, and you develop leadership skills, which have benefited me in many other areas of my life. Sports was a gamechanger for me, and I believe that women and girls should have as much opportunity to flourish through sport in as many ways as possible." In December 2021, Azemah was appointed by ASEAN as a Women in Sports Ambassador to promote gender equality and women empowerment through sports. This part of the #WeScore campaign to build on the legacy of the delayed 2020 Tokyo Olympics.

Princess Azemah has represented her country in polo three times in the Southeast Asian Games. All three times she played alongside her brother, Prince Mateen, and her husband, Prince Bahar. At the 2017 SEA Games, the Bruneian national team that included Princess Azemah earned a bronze medal. She became the first female competitor from Brunei to earn a medal. Nearly 3,000 spectators came to watch the match between Brunei and Malaysia. At the 2019 SEA Games, Azemah and the Bruneian team won the silver medal in the low goal division and the bronze medal in the high goal division. At the 2025 SEA Games, Azemah and the Bruneian team again earned a silver medal in the low goal division and a bronze medal in the high goal division.

In 2024, Azemah played on the national team at the All Asia Cup in Thailand where they won the silver medal.

In addition to playing for the national team, Princess Azemah plays for Brunei team, a professional polo team that is a subsidiary of MB Polo. They compete at the Torneo Internacional de Polo in Sotogrande, Spain. In, 2016, they won first place in the medium goal division of the Silver Cup. In 2019, they won first place at the Gold Cup in the medium goal division. In 2022, they earned second place at the Silver Cup. In 2025, they won first place in the medium goal division of the Silver Cup.

In October 2023, the Brunei team, captained by Princess Azemah, won the first Agong's Cup in Putrajaya, Malaysia. They defeated the Jogo Polo team 7–5. In July 2024, the Brunei team won second place in His Majesty’s Polo Cup in Jerudong, Brunei. They lost to the MB Polo team captained by Prince Mateen.

Princess Azemah also plays at the annual Charity Polo Tournament at the Royal Brunei Polo and Riding Club, in Jerudong to raise funds for Pusat Ehsan, a special needs charity founded by her mother.

== Royal duties ==
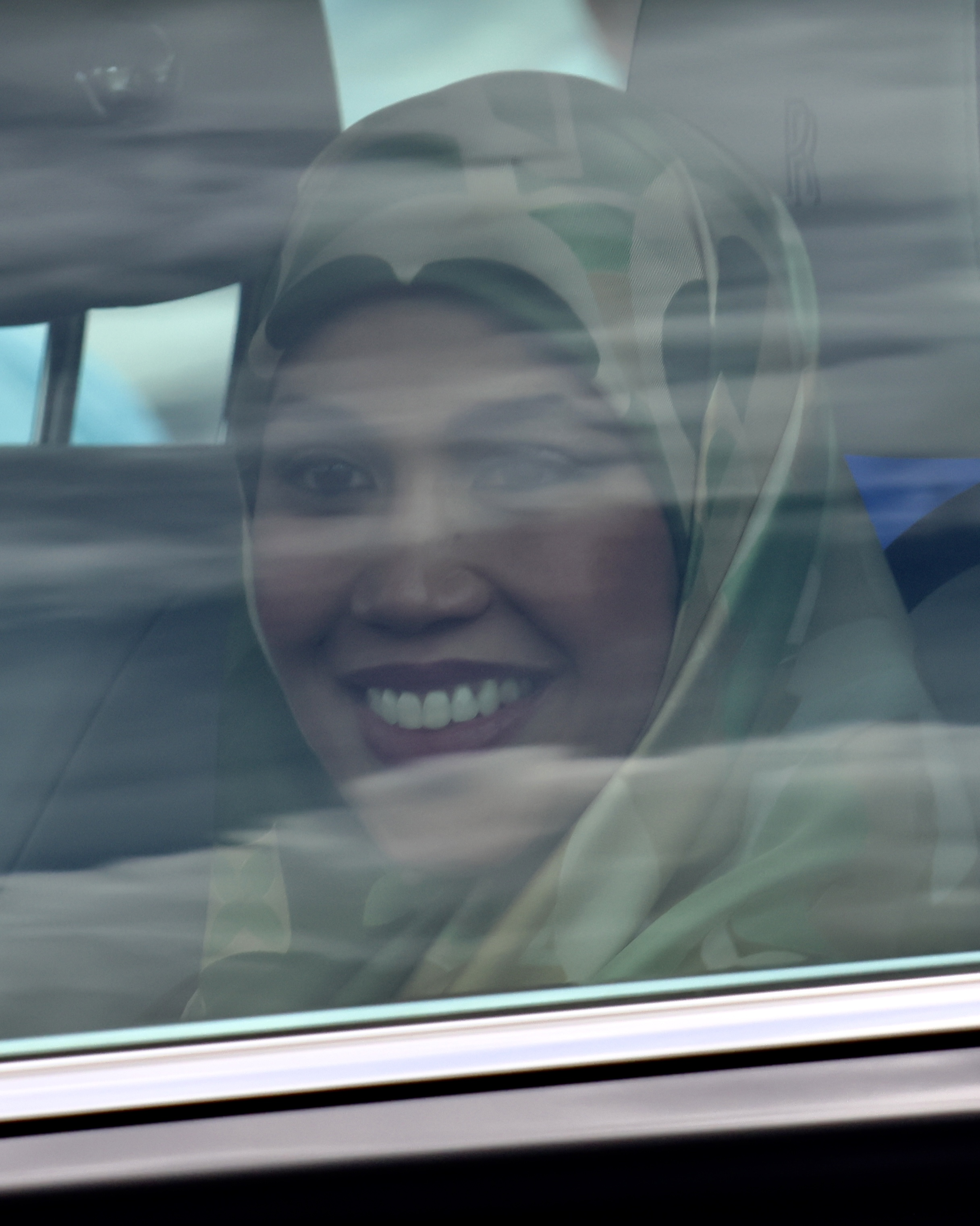
Azemah at the wedding procession of Prince Abdul Mateen; January 2024

As a member of the royal family, Princess Azemah regularly participates in incoming state visits to Brunei, investiture ceremonies, and National Day celebrations. In July 2024, she traveled to Kuala Lumpur for the installation of Ibrahim Iskandar of Johor as the 17th King of Malaysia.

She has presented Kurnia Peribadi personal gifts during Hari Raya Aidilfitri on behalf of her father. In 2016 and 2017, Azemah issued gifts in the Belait District. In 2019, she and her half-sister, Princess Hafizah, attended the ceremony of delivering personal gifts to people in the Brunei–Muara District

Princess Azemah is the Chairperson of The Board of Trustees of Pusat Ehsan Al-Ameerah Al-Hajjah Maryam, a special needs charity founded by her mother, Mariam Abdul Aziz. Pusat Ehsan is dedicated to offering high-quality training, rehabilitation, and educational opportunities for people with special needs. In 2008 and 2017, she opened the Pusat Ehsan charity bazaar and visited the exhibition booths at the center in Bandar Seri Begawan. In July 2017, Azemah opened the center's new rehabilitation block that she had helped fund. In July 2024, she attended the inauguration of Brunei's first special education school, Sekolah Al-Ameerah Al-Hajjah Maryam, at Pusat Ehsan.

In 2016, Princess Azemah along with her brother, Prince Mateen, began an annual Charity Polo Day to raise money for Pusat Ehsan. Azemah plays in the polo match and presents the proceeds to representatives from the charity. The inaugural event raised B$ 52,122. She later handed over proceeds of B$53,416 in 2017, B$83,056 in 2019, B$135,819 in 2022, and B$141,685 in 2023.

Princess Azemah often attends fitness and sports related engagements. In 2009, she along with her sister, Princess Fadzilah, and sister-in-law, Crown Princess Sarah, participated in the Setia Motors Netball Open Championship at the Hassanal Bolkiah National Sports Complex. On 17 April 2016, Princess Azemah joined the Let's Walk/Run Ladies event and presented the awards after at Jerudong Park. On 19 March 2018, she attended and presented the Brunei Ladies Open Champion Trophy to Hong Ran from South Korea.

In 2022, Princess Azemah, Princess Fadzilah, and Prince Mateen collaborated with Progresif Media and Relentless Entertainment to create a documentary called 'Prince Azim: Son of the Arts' about their brother, Prince Azim, who died in 2020. The earnings from screenings of the documentary were presented to four of his favorite charities on 23 July 2022 at Istana Nurul Izzah.

== Titles, styles, and honours ==
Styles of Princess Azemah
- Reference style: Yang Teramat Mulia
- Alternative style: Her Royal Highness

=== Title and style ===
Her full title and style is Yang Teramat Mulia Paduka Seri Pengiran Anak Puteri 'Azemah Ni'matul Bolkiah binti Kebawah Duli Yang Maha Mulia Paduka Seri Baginda Sultan Haji Hassanal Bolkiah Mu'izzaddin Wad'daulah It is usually translated in English as Her Royal Highness Princess Azemah of Brunei.

=== Honours ===
- Royal Family Order of the Crown of Brunei (DKMB)
- Sultan Hassanal Bolkiah Medal (PHBS; 1 August 1968)
- Meritorious Service Medal (PJK; 12 June 2024)
- Proclamation of Independence Medal (1 January 1984)
- Sultan of Brunei Silver Jubilee Medal (5 October 1992)
- Sultan of Brunei Golden Jubilee Medal (5 October 2017)
- National Day Silver Jubilee Medal (23 February 2009)
