= Princess Majeedah Nuurul Bolkiah =

Bruneian princess (born 1976)

Majeedah Nuurul Bolkiah
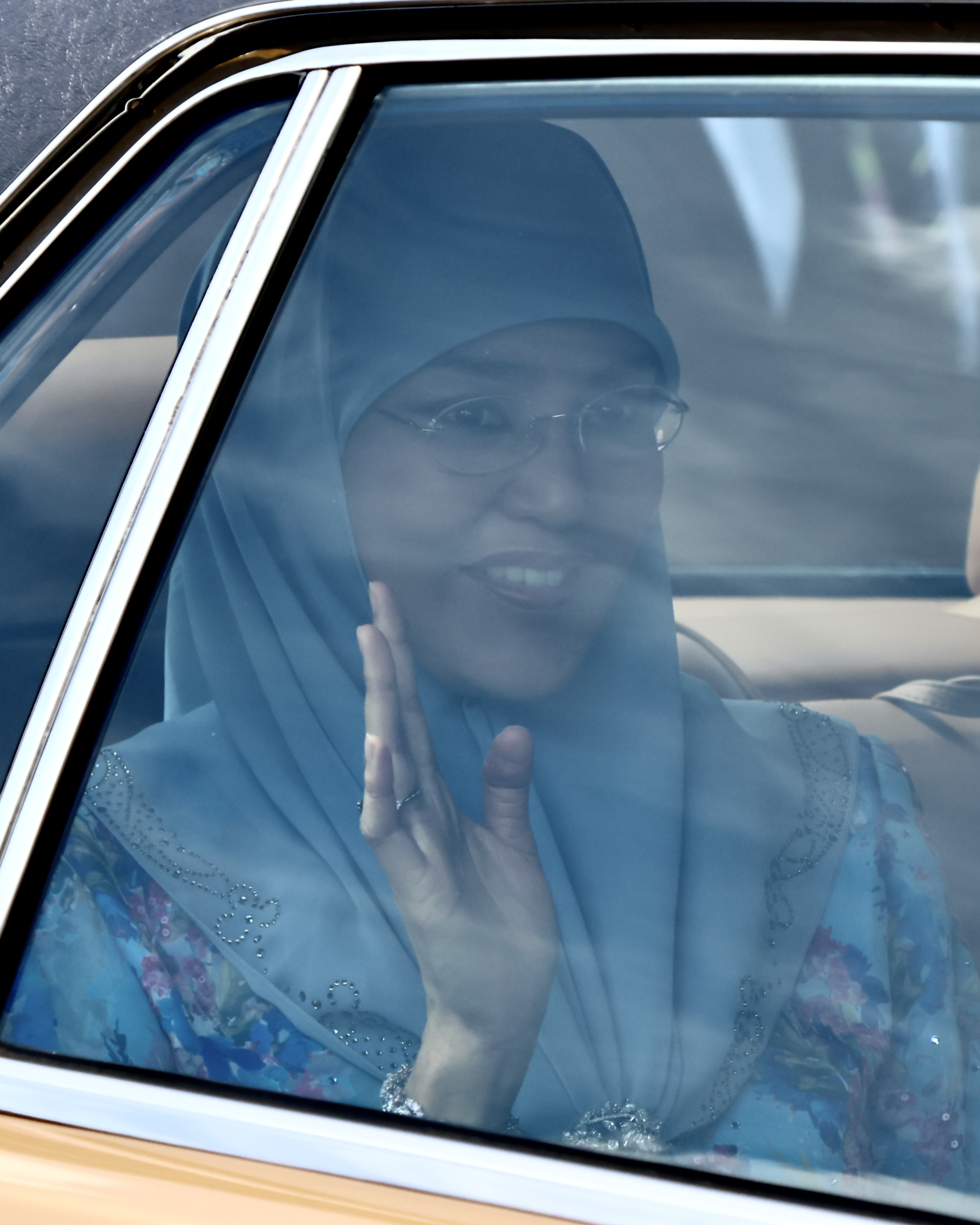
- Majeedah in 2024
- Born: Majeedah Nuurul Bolkiah binti Hassanal Bolkiah Mu'izzaddin Waddaulah; 16 March 1976 (age 50); Bandar Seri Begawan, Brunei
- Spouse: Khairul Khalil bin Ja'afari (m. 2007; div. 2023)
- Issue: Abdul Hafeez; Raihaanah Hanaa-Ul
- House: Bolkiah
- Father: Hassanal Bolkiah
- Mother: Saleha binti Mohamed Alam
- Religion: Sunni Islam
- Education: Universiti Brunei Darussalam; King's College London

Majeedah Nuurul Bolkiah binti Hassanal Bolkiah (Jawi: مجيدة نور البلقية; born 16 March 1976) is a member of the royal family of Brunei. She is the fourth child of Sultan Hassanal Bolkiah of Brunei and Queen Saleha.

== Early life ==
Princess Majeedah was born on 16 March 1976 to Sultan Hassanal Bolkiah of Brunei and his first wife, Queen Saleha of Brunei. She has five full siblings and six half-siblings from her father's other marriages.

== Education ==
Princess Majeedah attended St. Andrew's School and Paduka Seri Begawan Sultan Science College. She passed the Primary Certificate of Education in 1987, the Brunei Junior Certificate of Education in 1990, and received several GCE O Levels in 1992.

In September 2000, Majeedah graduated from Universiti Brunei Darussalam with a Bachelor of Arts with honours in Administration and Public Policy. She then earned a Master of Arts in environmental development from King's College London in January 2005.

== Marriage and issue ==
In June 2007, Princess Majeedah married Pengiran Khairul Khalil bin Pengiran Syed Ja'afari in an elaborate two week celebration from the 1st to the 14th.

The Majlis Istiadat Berbedak Pengantin Diraja or powdering ceremony was held on the 5th at Istana Nurul Iman. Majeedah and Khairul's families applied scented powder and oils to their hands to bless them. On the 7th was the Majlis Istiadat Akad Nikah Diraja or solemnisation ceremony at Omar Ali Saifuddien Mosque where they were officially married. On the 9th was the Majlis Istiadat Berinai Diraja, or henna ceremony, where the couple wore matching red traditional outfits. The Majlis Bersanding Pengantin Diraja was on the 10th and was followed by a procession through the streets of Bandar Seri Begawan. The last big event was the Majlis Persantapan Diraja which was a large banquet at Istana Nurul Iman on the 11th.

The couple have two children both of whom have the style of Yang Amat Mulia and the title of Pengiran Anak.

- Abdul Hafeez bin Khairul Khalil (born 18 March 2008)
- Raihaanah Hanna-Ul Bolqiah binti Khairul Khalil (born 6 January 2010).

On 7 December 2023, it was announced that Princess Majeedah and Khairul Khalil were divorced.

== Career ==
She presently serves as the Department of the Environment, Parks and Recreation's Senior Environment Officer and Chief of the Planning and Management Division. This organization is part of the Ministry of Development.

On 11 February 2002, Princess Majeedah started her work as a Special Duties Officer in the Environment Unit, a division of the Ministry of Development in charge of strategic and policy-related environmental issues. Evaluating the Environmental Impact Assessment Report of the Sungai Liang Industrial Site Development is one of the duties of the Planning and Management Division. The Asean Youth Forum on Environment, which took place on 8 January 2007, is one of a number of successful initiatives under her direct supervision.

Her writings include the Position Paper on Brunei's Accession to the Basel Agreement to Control the Disposal and Transboundary Transport of Hazardous Waste and the Environmental Management Guidelines for Quarry Activities.

== Titles, styles, and honours ==
Styles of Princess Majeedah
- Reference style: Yang Teramat Mulia
- Alternative style: Her Royal Highness

=== Title and style ===
Her full title and style is Yang Teramat Mulia Paduka Seri Pengiran Anak Puteri Majeedah Nuurul Bolkiah binti Kebawah Duli Yang Maha Mulia Paduka Seri Baginda Sultan Hassanal Bolkiah Mu'izzaddin Wad'daulah It is usually translated in English as Her Royal Highness Princess Majeedah of Brunei.

=== Honours ===
- Order of the Crown of Brunei (DKMB)
- Hassanal Bolkiah Sultan Medal (PHBS)
- Sultan of Brunei Silver Jubilee Medal (5 October 1992)
- Sultan of Brunei Golden Jubilee Medal (5 October 2017)
- Proclamation of Independence Medal (1 January 1984)

=== Namesakes ===
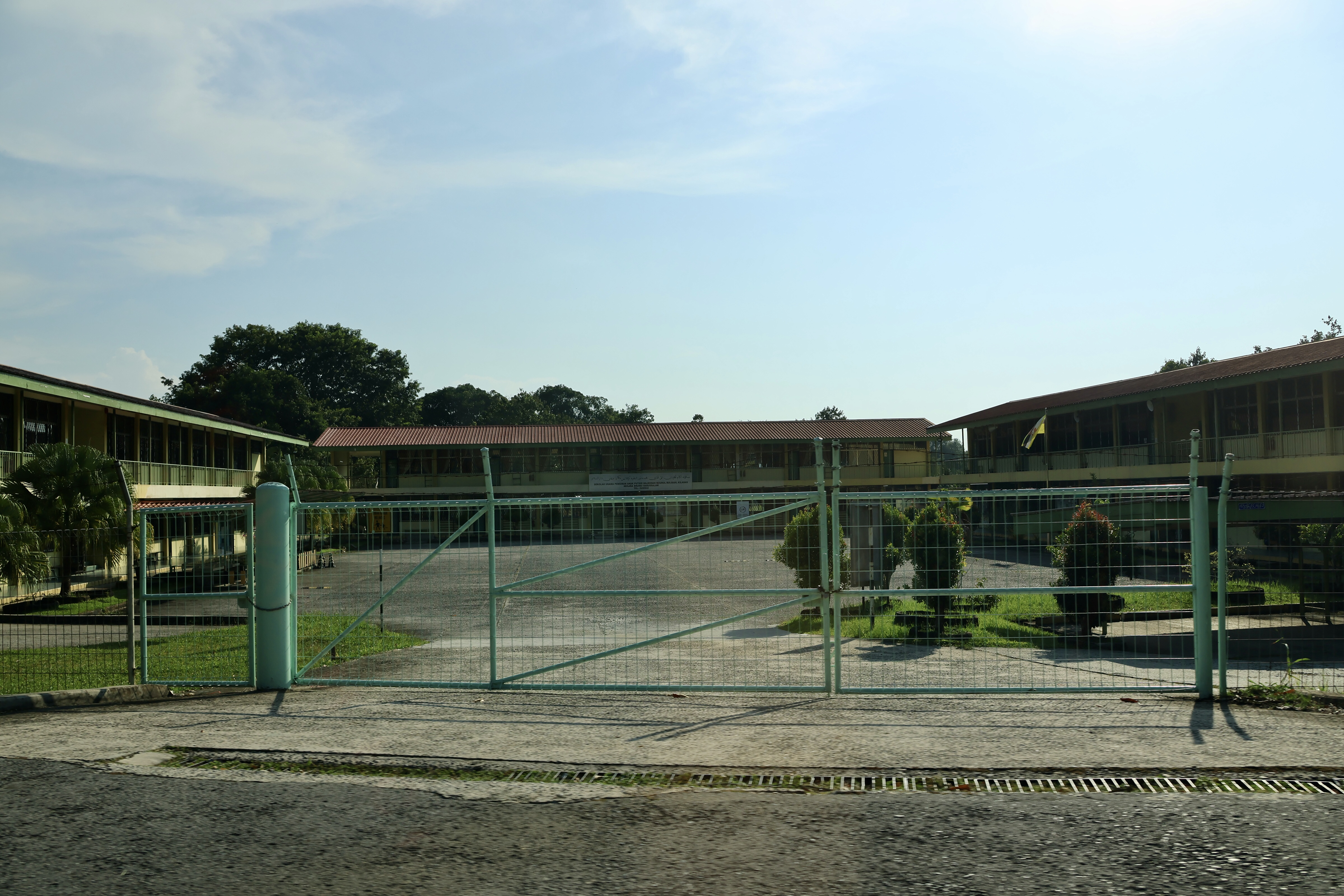
Pengiran Anak Puteri Majeedah Nuurul Bulqiah Religious School (Sekolah Ugama Pengiran Anak Puteri Majeedah Nuurul Bulqiah) at Kampong Kilanas

- Pengiran Anak Puteri Majeedah Nuurul Bulqiah Religious School, a religious school in Kampong Kilanas.
