= Dyg =

Dyg or DYG may refer to:

- Dayang (honorific), Brunei
- Zhangjiajie Hehua International Airport, China (IATA:DYG)
- Tegh, Armenia
