= Royal Family Order of the Crown of Brunei =

Order of Brunei

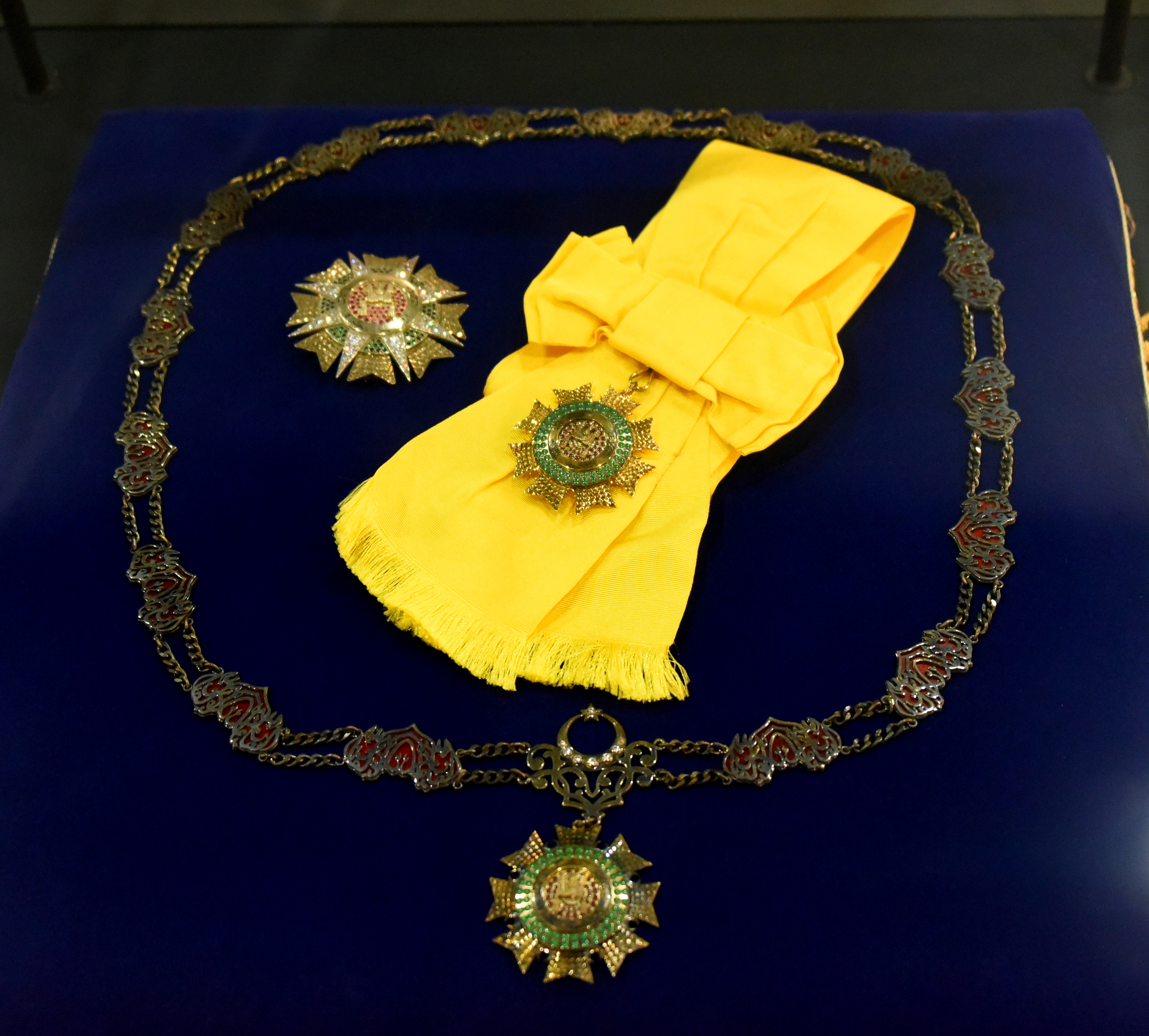
- DKMB neck decoration

Awarded by the Sultan of Brunei
- Type: Royal family order
- Established: 15 August 1982
- Country: Brunei
- Eligibility: Members of the Brunei royal family
- Criteria: At His Majesty's pleasure
- Status: Currently constituted
- Sovereign: Hassanal Bolkiah
- Post-nominals: DKMB

Precedence
- Next (lower): Family Order of Laila Utama

The Most Esteemed Royal Family Order of the Crown of Brunei (Malay: Darjah Kerabat Diraja Mahkota Brunei) is an order of Brunei. It was established on 15 August 1982 by Sultan Hassanal Bolkiah. The order carries the post-nominal letters "DKMB".

== Recipients ==
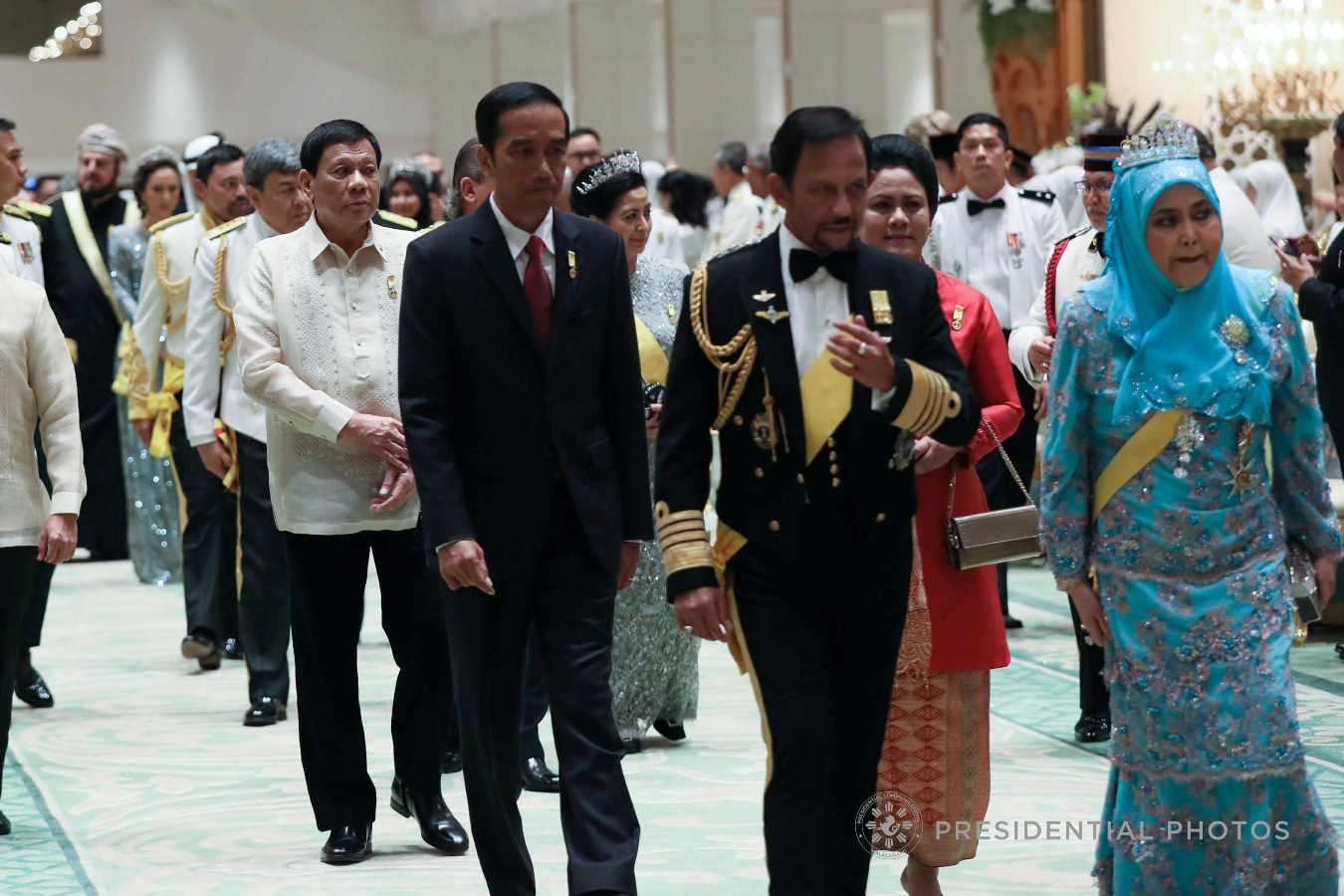
Sultan Hassanal Bolkiah and Queen Saleha wearing the order's sash in 2017

=== Bruneian royalty ===
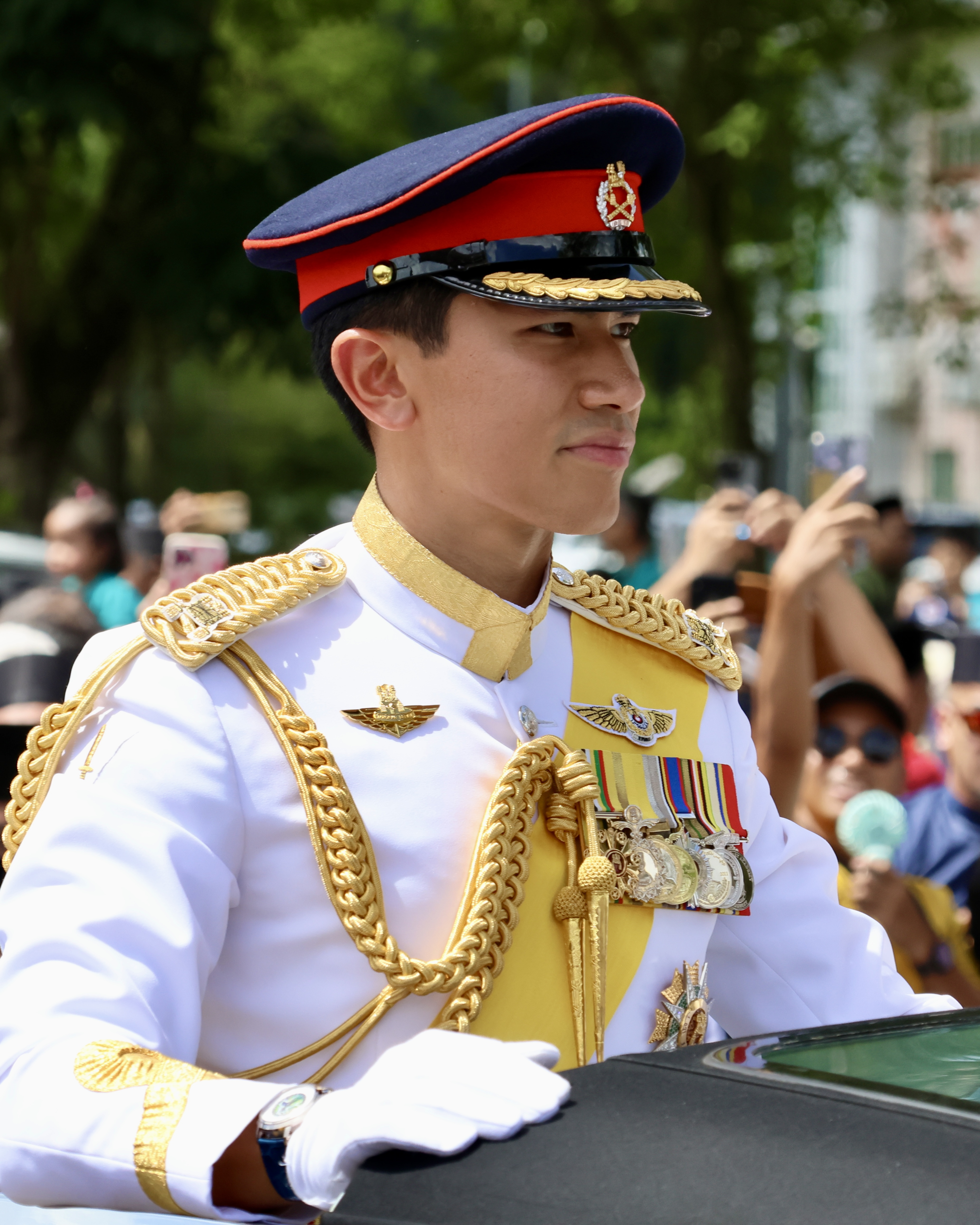
Prince Abdul Mateen wearing his sash in 2024

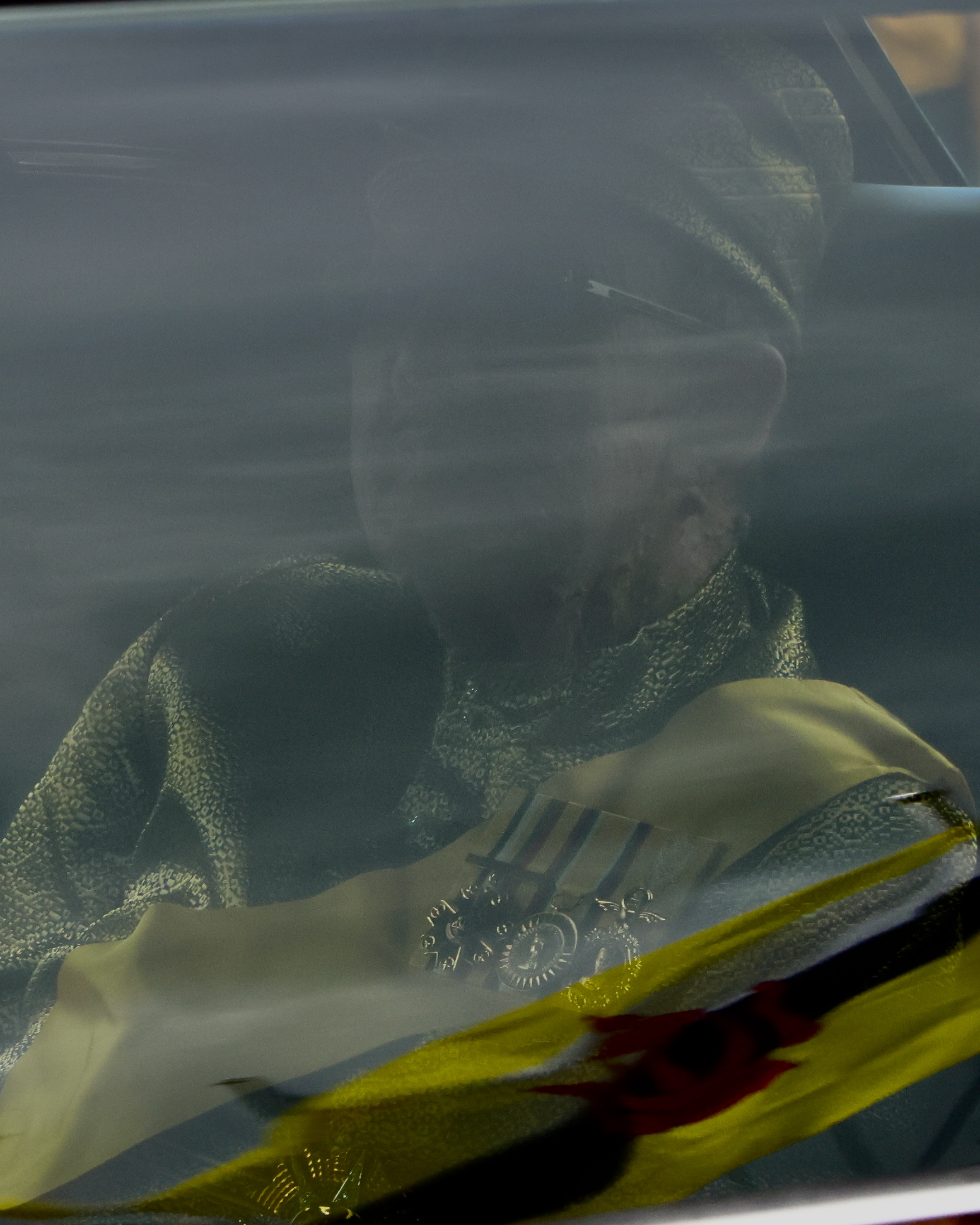
Prince Sufri Bolkiah wearing his sash in 2024

==== Current recipients ====
- Sultan Haji Hassanal Bolkiah, Sultan and Yang di-Pertuan of Brunei (15 August 1982)
- Raja Isteri Pengiran Anak Hajah Saleha, Queen Consort of Brunei (15 August 1982)
- Pengiran Muda Mahkota Pengiran Muda Haji Al-Muhtadee Billah, Crown Prince of Brunei (15 August 1982)
- Pengiran Anak Puteri Hajah Rashidah Sa'adatul Bolkiah, Princess of Brunei
- Pengiran Anak Puteri Hajah Muta-Wakkilah Hayatul Bolkiah, Princess of Brunei
- Pengiran Anak Puteri Hajah Majeedah Nuurul Bolkiah, Princess of Brunei
- Pengiran Anak Puteri Hajah Hafizah Sururul Bolkiah, Princess of Brunei
- Pengiran Muda Abdul Malik, Prince of Brunei
- Pengiran Anak Puteri Azemah Ni'matul Bolkiah, Princess of Brunei
- Pengiran Anak Puteri Fadzilah Lubabul Bolkiah, Princess of Brunei
- Pengiran Muda Abdul Mateen, Prince of Brunei
- Pengiran Muda Abdul Wakeel, Prince of Brunei
- Pengiran Anak Puteri Ameerah Wardatul Bolkiah, Princess of Brunei
- Pengiran Muda Haji Mohamed Bolkiah, Prince of Brunei
- Pengiran Muda Haji Sufri Bolkiah, Prince of Brunei
- Pengiran Muda Haji Jefri Bolkiah, Prince of Brunei

==== Former recipients ====
- Sultan Sir Muda Haji Omar Ali Saifuddien III, former Sultan of Brunei (deceased)
- Pengiran Muda Haji Abdul Azim, Prince of Brunei (deceased)
- Hajah Mariam, former consort of Sultan Hassanal Bolkiah (revoked)
- Azrinaz Mazhar, former consort of Sultan Hassanal Bolkiah (revoked)

=== Foreign recipients ===
- Jordan: King Hussein I bin Talal I, King of the Hashemite Kingdom of Jordan (1984)
- Oman: Sultan Qaboos bin Said, Sultan of Oman (1984)
- Malaysia: Sultan Ismail Petra, Sultan of Kelantan (1988)
- Malaysia: Sultan Azlan Shah, Sultan of Perak & 9th Yang di-Pertuan Agong of Malaysia (1988)
- Malaysia: Sultan Iskandar, Sultan of Johor & 8th Yang di-Pertuan Agong of Malaysia (1988)
- Indonesia: President Soeharto, President of Indonesia (1988)
- Thailand: King Bhumibol Adulyadej, King of Thailand (1990)
- United Kingdom: Queen Elizabeth II, Queen of the United Kingdom and the other Commonwealth Realms (1992)
- Malaysia: Tuanku Ja'afar, Yang di-Pertuan Besar of Negeri Sembilan & 10th Yang di-Pertuan Agong of Malaysia (1996)
- Malaysia: Sultan Mizan Zainal Abidin, Sultan of Terengganu & 13th Yang di-Pertuan Agong of Malaysia (1999)
- Malaysia: Tuanku Syed Sirajuddin, Raja of Perlis & 12th Yang di-Pertuan Agong of Malaysia (2002)
- Malaysia: Sultan Abdul Halim, Sultan of Kedah & 5th and 14th Yang di-Pertuan Agong of Malaysia (2002)
- Sweden: King Carl XVI Gustaf, King of Sweden (2004)
- Jordan: King Abdullah II bin Hussein I, King of the Hashemite Kingdom of Jordan (2008)
- Netherlands: Princess Beatrix of the Netherlands, former Queen of the Netherlands (2013) (conferred as Queen)
- Malaysia: Sultan Ibrahim Ismail, Sultan of Johor & 17th Yang di-Pertuan Agong of Malaysia (2014)
- Kuwait: Sheikh Sabah Al-Ahmad Al-Jaber Al-Sabah, Emir of Kuwait (2015)
- Saudi Arabia: King Salman, King of Saudi Arabia (2017)
- Bahrain: King Hamad bin Isa Al Khalifa, King of Bahrain (2017)
- Malaysia: Al-Sultan Abdullah, Sultan of Pahang & 16th Yang di-Pertuan Agong of Malaysia (2019)
- Oman: Sultan Haitham bin Tariq, Sultan of Oman (2026)

==== Unknown date of conferment ====
- Malaysia: Sultan Ahmad Shah, Sultan of Pahang & 7th Yang di-Pertuan Agong of Malaysia
- Malaysia: Sultan Mahmud, Sultan of Terengganu
- Malaysia: Sultan Salahuddin, Sultan of Selangor & 11th Yang di-Pertuan Agong of Malaysia
