= St. Andrew's School, Brunei =

Private school in Brunei

St. Andrew's School
- Sekolah St. Andrew

Location
- Kampong Pusar Ulak, Jalan Haji Basir; Bandar Seri Begawan, BS8411; Brunei
- 4.89638°N 114.93737°E

Information
- Type: Private
- Motto: Courage & Love
- Founded: January 1956; 70 years ago
- Founder: Paul Chong En Siong
- Status: Operational
- Chairman: Stephen Ong
- Principal: Tan Lian Lian
- Gender: Coeducational
- Nickname: SAS
- Affiliations: CIE
- Website: saintandrew.edu.bn
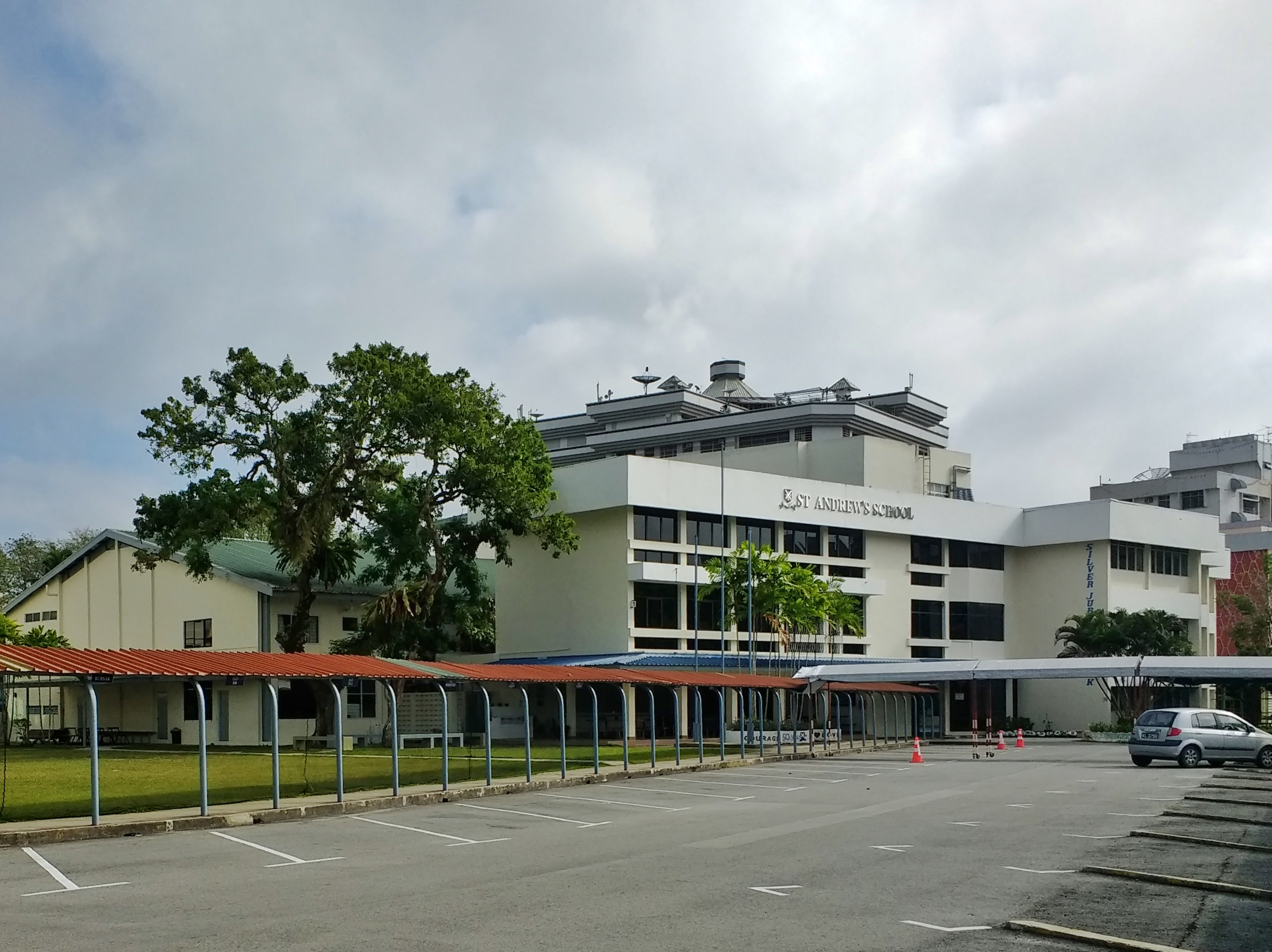

St. Andrew's School (SAS; Malay: Sekolah St. Andrew) is a Christian private, co-education school in Bandar Seri Begawan, Brunei, that is overseen and operated by the Anglican Church. It is Brunei's first Anglican school to be founded.

== History ==
The school was founded as an Anglican school in January 1956 by Rev. Canon Paul Chong En Siong, as a primary school with 70 students and 3 teachers. It was the first Anglican school in Brunei. Until 1964 it was based in a church vicarage. That year it moved to its current locations, a site donated by Ong Kim Kee. The Ministry of Religious Affairs has provided all Islamic Religious Knowledge professors with a temporary position since 1971. The school introduced computer studies classes in 1995.

Around 1000 students from Brunei and other countries attended the school in 2009; it offered kindergarten through secondary education. Secondary levels are taught in English, whereas primary levels are taught in Malay. In January 2018, a press release from St Andrew's School formally designated the brand-new parking lot adjacent to the school the Letak Kereta Pengiran Muda Haji 'Abdul 'Azim (Prince Haji 'Abdul 'Azim Car Park), situated on a 1.83 acres (0.74 ha) tract of property owned by Prince Abdul Azim.

== Notable alumni ==
- Prince Al-Muhtadee Billah
- Prince Abdul Qawi
- Prince Abdul Mateen
- Princess Sarah
- Princess Muta-Wakkilah Hayatul
- Princess Rashidah Sa'adatul
- Princess Azemah Ni'matul Bolkiah
- Rano Iskandar
- Nik Hafimi
- YAM Pg Anak Siti Radhiah
- Abdul Mutalib
- YAM Pg Anak Muhammad Ruzaini
- Lau How Teck
