= Mariam Abdul Aziz =

Former wife of Sultan Hassanal Bolkiah of Brunei (born 1956)

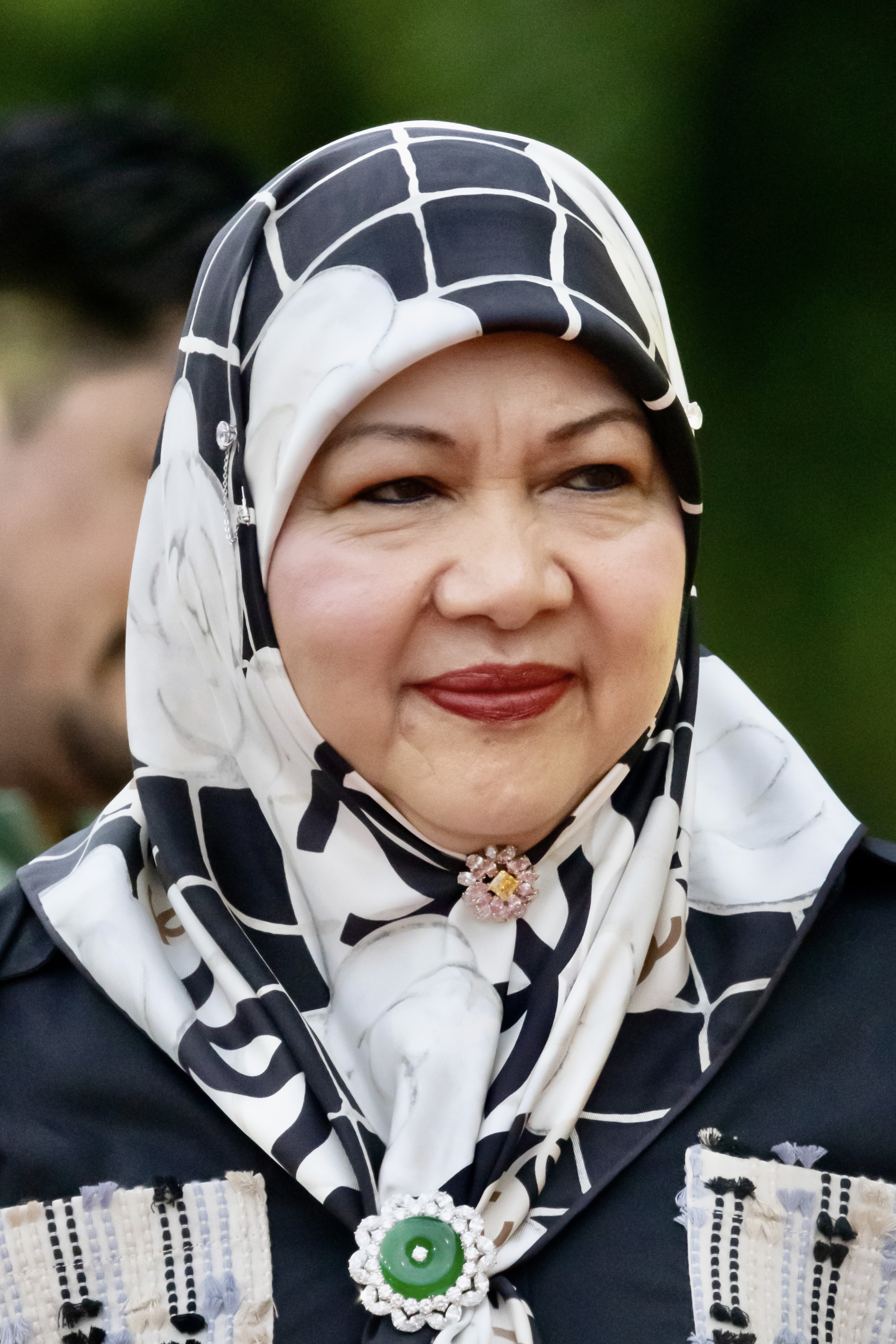
- Mariam in 2024
- Born: Mariam binti Abdul Aziz; 29 January 1956 (age 70); Brunei
- Spouse: Sultan Hassanal Bolkiah (m. 1981; div. 2003)
- Issue: Prince Abdul Azim; Princess Azemah; Princess Fadzilah; Prince Abdul Mateen
Names
- Mariam Aziz; Mariam Bell
Regnal name
- Yang Mulia Datin Paduka Seri Dayang Hajah Mariam binti Haji Abdul Aziz
- Father: Haji Abdul Aziz bin Abdullah
- Mother: Pengiran Rashidah binti Pengiran Mohammad Salleh
- Religion: Sunni Islam

Mariam binti Abdul Aziz (born 29 January 1956), is the former second wife of Sultan Hassanal Bolkiah of Brunei. They were married from 1981 to 2003.

== Early life and education ==
Mariam was born in 1955 or 1956 in Brunei Town to Abdul Aziz bin Abdullah and Rashidah binti Mohammad Salleh. Her father was born Jimmy Bell, of Scottish and Japanese descent. He converted to Islam and took the name Abdul Aziz when he married Rashidah, who was of Bruneian Malay descent. Abdul Aziz worked as a civil servant in the Royal Customs and Excise Department. Her siblings include Pehin Dato Jaafar Abdul Aziz and Dato Setia Samid Abdul Aziz.

She attended Sultan Omar Ali Saifuddien College in Brunei Town and worked as a flight attendant for Royal Brunei Airlines for six years.

== Marriage and issue ==
On 28 October 1981, Mariam married Sultan Hassanal Bolkiah in a private ceremony. They had met the year before while she was working as a flight attendant. Mariam became the Sultan's second wife as he was still married to his first wife, Queen Saleha. His father, Sultan Omar Ali Saifuddien III, disapproved of the marriage because Mariam was a mixed-race commoner.

The couple had four children.

- Prince Abdul Azim (29 July 1982 – 24 October 2020)
- Princess Azemah (26 September 1984); married Prince Bahar bin Jefri on 12 January 2023
- Princess Fadzilah (23 August 1985); married Abdullah Al-Hashimi on 20 January 2022 and had a daughter
  - Pengiran Anak Daniya Rahmatul (2 October 2024)
- Prince Abdul Mateen (10 August 1991); married Anisha Isa Kalebic on 11 January 2024
  - Pengiran Anak Zahra Mariam (8 February 2026)

Mariam also has a least ten adopted children including Afifa Abdullah and Farid Abdullah.

On 2 February 2003, the Sultan announced that he was divorcing Mariam after 21 years of marriage. The divorce was done with a single talaq and no reason for the divorce was given. All of her titles and honours were revoked.

== Jewellery lawsuit ==
Mariam accused Fatimah Kumin Lim of stealing jewelry in two lawsuits in London. The judge concluded that the thief had illegally sold two diamonds and a diamond jewellery worth about £12.5 million. She lives in Singapore and is currently pursuing compensation for the theft. Mariam had previously testified in court that she had given a diamond bracelet to one of her bodyguards on a night out in 2008 for safekeeping and had not seen it since.

== Social contributions ==
In 2000, Mariam founded Pusat Ehsan Al-Ameerah Al-Hajjah Maryam, a non-profit, charitable organization dedicated to offering high-quality training, rehabilitation, and educational opportunities for people with special needs. Mariam continues to serve as Pusat Ehsan's patron. The center was founded by Mariam with the intention of improving the lives of people with impairments. In 2024, Pusat Ehsan opened Brunei's first special education school, Sekolah Al-Ameerah Al-Hajjah Maryam.

She was the colonel-in-chief of the Royal Brunei Malay Regiment (RBMR) Women's Company (Kompeni Askar Wanita), which was founded in 1981.

== Residences ==
Mariam and her children reside in Istana Nurul Izzah in Kampong Jerudong, Brunei. The palace was built for her in 1985 by the Sultan at a cost of US$120 million.

In the United Kingdom, she has a townhouse in Pembroke Gardens, Kensington, London and a country house in Leicestershire.

== Titles, styles and honours ==
During her marriage, Mariam held the title Duli Yang Teramat Mulia Pengiran Isteri Hajah Mariam binti Haji Abdul Aziz or Her Royal Highness Princess Consort Mariam binti Abdul Aziz. This was revoked upon her divorce in 2003 and as of 2022, she still holds the title of Datin Paduka Seri.

=== Honours ===
==== National ====
- Royal Family Order of the Crown of Brunei (DKMB; 11 April 1987)
- Most Exalted Order of Famous Valour First Class (DPKT; 29 November 1996) – Datin Paduka Seri
- Sultan Hassanal Bolkiah Medal (PHBS; 1 August 1968)
- Sultan of Brunei Silver Jubilee Medal (5 October 1992).
- Proclamation of Independence Medal (1 January 1984)

==== Foreign ====
- Jordan:
  - Supreme Order of the Renaissance Grand Cordon (19 December 1984)
- Malaysia:
  - Malaysian Service Medal (PJM; 11 April 1987)
  - Royal Family Order of Kelantan (DK; 7 March 1999)
  - Royal Family Order of Johor First Class (DK I; 6 March 1997)
  - Order of the Crown of Johor Knight Grand Commander (SPMJ; 11 April 1987) – Datin Paduka
  - Order of the Star of the Hornbill of Sarawak Knight Commander (DA) – Datuk Amar
- South Korea:
  - Grand Order of Mugunghwa (6 April 1984)
- Egypt:
  - Order of the Virtues Supreme Class (17 December 1984)
- Thailand:
  - Dame Grand Cross of the Order of Chula Chom Klao (DGC; 26 August 2002)

=== Things named after her ===
- Pengiran Isteri Hajjah Mariam Hospital (PIHM Hospital), home to the fourth-largest district hospital in the nation. It is located at Temburong District's Bangar town.
- Pengiran Isteri Hajjah Mariam Secondary School (SMPIHM), a school in Kampong Serasa.
- Al-Ameerah Al-Hajjah Maryam Mosque, a place of worship in Kampong Jerudong.
