= Nik Hafimi =

Bruneian businessperson and politician (born 1973)

Nik Hafimi PSB
- نئ هافيمي
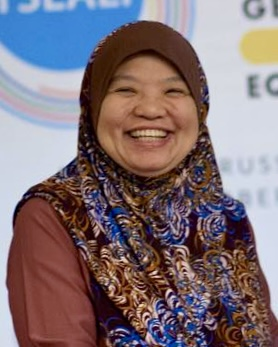
- Nik Hafimi in 2019

Member of the Legislative Council
- In office 13 January 2017 – 6 March 2022

Personal details
- Born: 12 November 1973 (age 52) Brunei
- Education: St. Andrew's School; Geelong Grammar School
- Alma mater: Deakin University (BA; BArch)
- Occupation: Politician; businesswoman

Nik Hafimi binti Abdul Haadii @ Frances Lo (born 12 November 1973) is a Bruneian businessperson and politician who was previously appointed as a member of Brunei's Legislative Council (LegCo) from 2017 to 2022. Notably, she is the chair of the Yayasan Committee on Social Enterprise and the founding member of the Young Entrepreneur Association of Brunei.

== Early life and education ==
Nik Hafimi was born on 12 November 1973 in Brunei, into a third generation business family. She attended Papakowphai Elementary School in New Zealand and St. Andrew's School in Brunei for her early schooling. She completed her secondary school in Australia at Geelong Grammar School. She has degrees from Deakin University in Australia in both Bachelor of Arts and Bachelor of Architecture with first-class honours. After more than ten years in Australia, she returned to Brunei in 1998 to work as an apprentice and receive training in a variety of roles at many businesses.

== Business career ==
In 2000, Nik Hafimi was confirmed as the executive director of LO International. Later that year, she became a founding member of the Young Entrepreneurs Association of Brunei (YEAB), and from 2012 to 2013, she served as its president. She was a member of the founding team of the ASEAN-China Young Entrepreneurs Forum from 2008 to 2013, with Brunei serving as the event's successful host in 2013. She was elected as a member of Brunei Darussalam to the APEC Business Advisory Council in 2013. Additionally, she is the executive director of the LVK Group of Companies, and holds directorships and shares in multiple businesses, including The Jag Shop, LO International, Gunung Intan Company, Mas Sugara Travel Services, and Bintang Berjaya Company.

She has held a number of prominent positions, including co-chairing the Sustainable Development Working Group in 2015 and serving as chair of the Micro, Small, and Medium Enterprise and Entrepreneurship Working Group at ABAC from 2017 to 2018. As of right now, she serves as the chair of the ABAC Inclusion Task Force in 2023. She is on the boards of TOQQA Global in Australia and Universiti Brunei Darussalam (UBD) in Brunei. She is also a member of the Digital Economy Council of Brunei. She was named to the Brunei Economic Development Board (BEDB) and Darussalam Enterprise (DE) boards in 2016. She was named chairman of Brunei Darussalam's Competition Commission (CCBD) on 6 December 2018.

== Political career ==
On 13 January 2017, she was named as a LegCo Member in the "Among the Persons Who Have Achieved Distinctions" category. On 5 May 2018, a dialogue session was arranged by the Institute of Policy Studies' Islamic Governance cluster with newly selected young representatives from LegCo. Nik Hafimi states, "There have been three changes to our school system. Long-term policies are required; current implementation lacks commitment and must be changed." She again said, "If we keep changing initiatives, we won't ever reach our goal."

During the second day of the 18th LegCo session on 25 February 2022, Nik Hafimi urged authorities to investigate the labour market, stating that it must be equitable for both locals and foreigners in terms of employment. She stated, "Laws covering both locals and foreigners can be improved." She added that the "working industry framework" should include lifelong learning or a minimal degree of education. After a week of discussions, LegCo members approved a BND5.7 billion budget for the fiscal year 2022–2023, which would take effect on 1 April. "To achieve our vision, we will always practice empowering the community and enabling inclusive opportunity," she stated. On 12 April, the Department of Councils of State declared that the appointed members of the LegCo were dissolved on 6 March.

As the chair of the CCBD, she participated in the 2nd Heads of Competition Agency Meeting, which was conducted in Brisbane, Australia, from 6 to 7 June 2023.

== Honours ==
Throughout her career, she has received the following:

- Order of Setia Negara Brunei Fourth Class (PSB; 2019)
