= Princess Muta-Wakkilah Hayatul Bolkiah =

Bruneian princess (born 1971)

Muta-Wakkilah Hayatul Bolkiah
- Born: Muta-Wakkilah Hayatul Bolkiah binti Hassanal Bolkiah Mu'izzaddin Waddaulah; 12 October 1971 (age 55); Istana Darul Hana, Bandar Seri Begawan, Brunei
- House: Bolkiah
- Father: Hassanal Bolkiah
- Mother: Saleha binti Mohamed Alam
- Religion: Sunni Islam
- Education: Universiti Brunei Darussalam; SOAS University of London

Muta-Wakkilah Hayatul Bolkiah binti Hassanal Bolkiah (Jawi: متوكلة حياة البلقية; born 12 October 1971) is a member of the royal family of Brunei. She is the second child of Sultan Hassanal Bolkiah of Brunei and Queen Saleha.

== Early life ==
Princess Muta-Wakkilah was born on 12 October 1971 at Istana Darul Hana to Sultan Hassanal Bolkiah of Brunei and his first wife, Queen Saleha of Brunei. She has five full siblings and six half-siblings from her father's other marriages.

== Education ==
Princess Muta-Wakkilah started her education at the private school set up for royal children at Istana Darul Hana. She then attended St. Andrew's School.

Muta Wakkilah earned a Bachelor's degree with lower second-class honours in management from Universiti Brunei Darussalam. In July 2005, she graduated from the School of Oriental and African Studies, University of London, with a Bachelor of Laws degree with upper second class honours. In August 2006, she enrolled in the Bar Vocational Course at BPP Law School.

On 22 November 2007, Princess Muta-Wakkilah took part in her Call to the bar ceremony as a member of Gray's Inn in London. Her parents, Sultan Hassanal Bolkiah and Queen Saleha, were present at the ceremony.

== Royal duties ==
In addition to regular events with other members of the royal family, Princess Muta-Wakkilah often attends events related to the law. On 1 May 2006, she visited the Royal Brunei Armed Forces Military Legal Unit at the Ministry of Defence, Bolkiah Garrison. While there she attended a fictitious court hearing at the court marshal

On 6 February 2013, Muta-Wakkilah attended the AANZFTA-WIPO seminar on accession to Madrid Protocol for trademark owners, SMEs, and trademark agents On 24 April 2013, she presided over a workshop on issues related to intellectual property (IP) and free trade agreements (FTAs) at the Attorney General's Chambers (AGC) Law and Courts Building.

== Titles, styles, and honours ==
Styles of Princess Muta-Wakkilah
- Reference style: Yang Teramat Mulia
- Alternative style: Her Royal Highness

=== Title and style ===
Her full title and style is Yang Teramat Mulia Paduka Seri Pengiran Anak Puteri Muta-Wakkilah Hayatul Bolkiah binti Kebawah Duli Yang Maha Mulia Paduka Seri Baginda Sultan Hassanal Bolkiah Mu'izzaddin Wad'daulah It is usually translated in English as Her Royal Highness Princess Muta-Wakkilah of Brunei.

=== Honours ===
- Order of the Crown of Brunei (DKMB)
- Hassanal Bolkiah Sultan Medal (PHBS)
- Sultan of Brunei Silver Jubilee Medal (5 October 1992)
- Sultan of Brunei Golden Jubilee Medal (5 October 2017)
- National Day Silver Jubilee Medal (23 February 2009)
- Proclamation of Independence Medal (1997)

=== Namesakes ===
- Pengiran Anak Puteri Hajah Muta-Wakillah Hayatul Bolkiah Health Centre, a clinic in Kampong Rimba.
- Pengiran Anak Puteri Muta-Wakkilah Hayatul Bolkiah Religious School, a school in Kampong Serusop.
