= Prince Abdul Mateen of Brunei =

Foreign Minister Of Brunei

Abdul Mateen
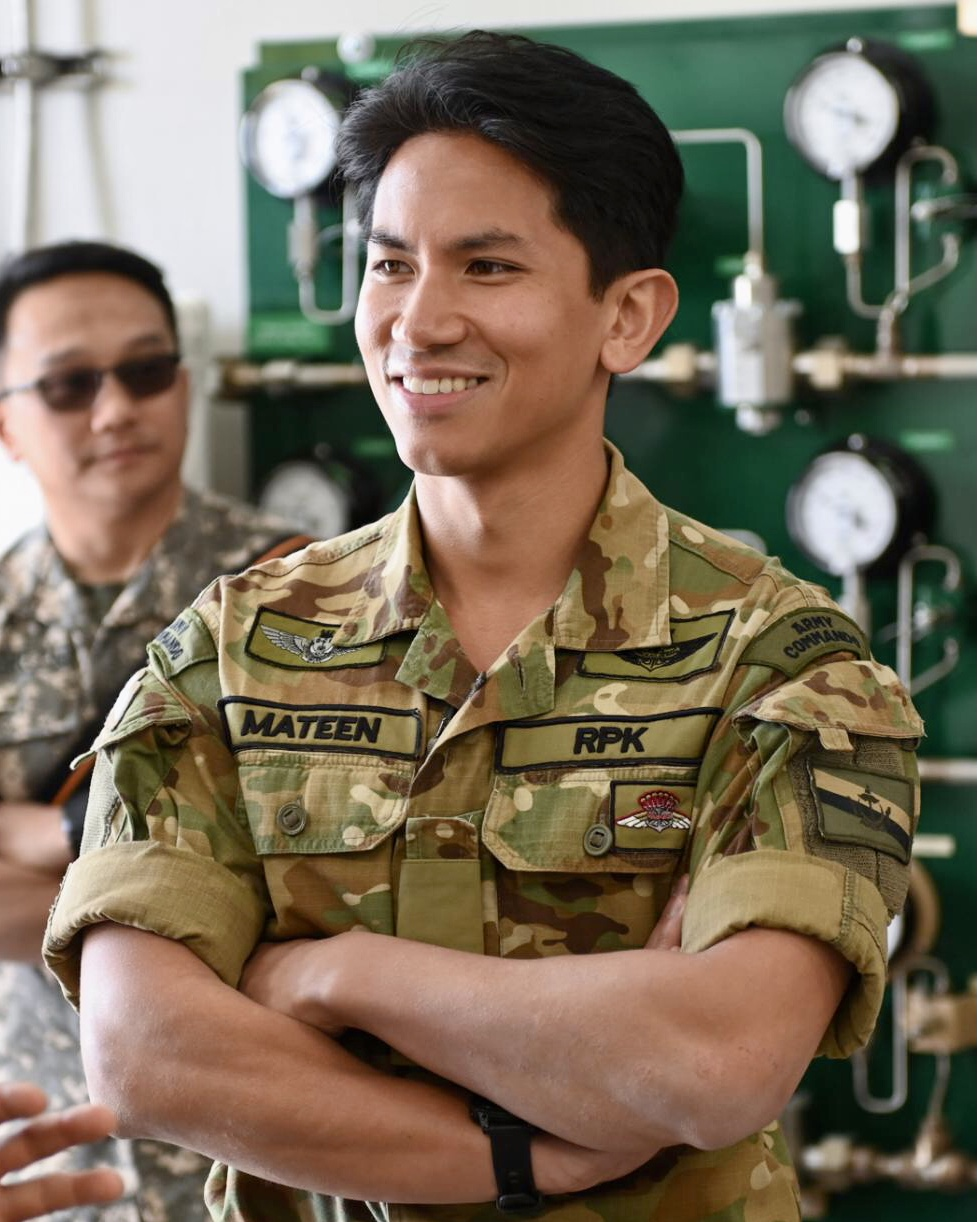
- Mateen in 2023

3rd Minister of Foreign Affairs
- Incumbent
- Assumed office 4 June 2026
- Monarch: Hassanal Bolkiah
- Preceded by: Hassanal Bolkiah
- Born: 10 August 1991 (age 35); Raja Isteri Pengiran Anak Saleha Hospital, Bandar Seri Begawan, Brunei
- Spouse: Anisha Rosnah (m. 2024)
- Issue: Princess Zahra Mariam Bolkiah
- House: Bolkiah
- Father: Hassanal Bolkiah
- Mother: Mariam Abdul Aziz
- Religion: Sunni Islam
- Education: King's College London (BA); Royal Military Academy Sandhurst; School of Oriental and African Studies (MA); Sports career
- Country: Brunei
- Sport: Polo
Medal record
Polo
Representing Brunei
SEA Games
Bronze medal – third place	2017 Kuala Lumpur	Polo tournament
Bronze medal – third place	2019 Calatagan	Polo tournament
Silver medal – second place	2025 Bangkok	Mixed 2-4 Goals
Bronze medal – third place	2025 Bangkok	Mixed 4-6 Goals
- Military career
- Allegiance: Brunei
- Branch: Royal Brunei Air Force
- Service years: 2010–present
- Rank: Lieutenant Colonel
- Unit: Special Forces Regiment

Abdul Mateen ibni Hassanal Bolkiah (Jawi: عبد المتين; born 10 August 1991) is a member of the royal family of Brunei and the current minister of foreign affairs of Brunei since 2026. He is the son of Sultan Hassanal Bolkiah and his former second wife Mariam Abdul Aziz. He is fifth in the line of succession to the Bruneian throne.

== Early life ==
Prince Mateen was born on 10 August 1991 at Raja Isteri Pengiran Anak Saleha Hospital in Bandar Seri Begawan, Brunei to Sultan Hassanal Bolkiah and his former second wife, Mariam Abdul Aziz. He is the fourth son and tenth child of the Sultan. Mateen has three older full siblings: Prince Azim, Princess Azemah, and Princess Fadzilah along with eight half siblings from his father's other marriages.

He was raised and continues to reside at Istana Nurul Izzah in Kampong Jerudong, Brunei. The palace was built in the mid-1980s for the then Princess Consort Mariam and her children.

== Education ==
Prince Mateen received his primary education at the St. Andrew's School in Bandar Seri Begawan, Brunei. He continued his secondary education at the Paduka Seri Begawan Sultan Science College and Jerudong International School.

In July 2014, Prince Mateen received his Bachelor of Arts degree in International Politics from King's College London in the United Kingdom. In July 2016, Prince Mateen was awarded a Master of Arts degree in International Studies and Diplomacy from the School of Oriental and African Studies, University of London.

== Career ==
=== Military career ===
Prince Mateen began his military career by following in his father's footsteps. He enrolled in the 44 week Regular Commissioning Course at Royal Military Academy Sandhurst along with over 200 other recruits on 9 May 2010. Prince Mateen graduated and participated in the 102nd Sovereign's Parade on 15 April 2011. Upon completion of the course, he was promoted to the rank of Second Lieutenant.

Prince Mateen was then attached to the Household Cavalry Mounted Regiment's Life Guards and Blues and Royals at Hyde Park Barracks, London. He was promoted to the rank of Lieutenant on 15 September 2012.

On 28 April 2017, Prince Mateen completed a seven month Elementary Flying Training course on a Grob G 115 aircraft at RAF Cranwell. He was promoted to Captain in the Royal Brunei Air Force on 9 May 2017 after serving as an acting captain since 9 May 2016.

From September 2017 to March 2018, Prince Mateen completed the Single Engine Rotary Wing training at the Defence Helicopter Flying School at RAF Shawbury. He qualified as a helicopter pilot while training on Squirrel HT1/2 and Griffin HT1 helicopters. The Sultan presented Prince Mateen with his Aircrew Flying Badge (wings) at his graduation ceremony on 28 March 2018. In September he underwent Helicopter Underwater Escape Training at the Megamas Training Company and in November he completed the first stage of his training on the S-70i Black Hawk helicopter at CAE Brunei Multi-Purpose Training Centre.

On 30 June 2019, the Sultan presented Prince Mateen with honorary membership in the Special Forces Regiment as part of the celebrations honoring the 58th anniversary of the Royal Brunei Armed Forces. That same year, he completed the Basic Airborne Static Line and Basic Military Freefall training which qualifies him to perform jumps from aircraft and he underwent Aviation Physiology Training at Singapore Aeromedical Centre.

On 20 May 2021, Prince Mateen was promoted to the rank of Major in the RBAF. Later that year, Prince Mateen underwent the All Arms Commando Course at the Commando Training Centre Royal Marines in the United Kingdom for eleven weeks from September to December and was one of the top ten in the course. He received his Green Beret at the graduation ceremony on 4 December 2021 which was presented by his father, Sultan Hassanal Bolkiah.

On 23 September 2022, Prince Mateen was awarded the Parachute Badge with Wings at RAF Brize Norton after completing the Basic Parachute Course. The RAF reported that he had spent the previous two weeks training alongside 64 other new parachutists.

From 13 to 14 March 2023, Prince Mateen took part in a comprehensive tour of the Coronado, California-based Naval Special Warfare (NSW) commands. He met with members of NSW and Rear Admiral Keith B. Davids, chief of Navy Special Warfare Command, to talk about potential areas of future cooperation.

From September 2024 to July 2025, Prince Mateen completed the Advanced Command and Staff Course at the Defence Academy of the United Kingdom. On July 18, the Sultan attended his graduation ceremony and presented him with the Pass Staff College Certificate and the Cormorant Pin, which is awarded to international course members. On 6 November 2025, Prince Mateen was promoted to the rank of Lieutenant Colonel in the RBAF.

=== Diplomatic career ===
In April 2011, the Sultan appointed Prince Mateen as a member of the Privy Council and he is also the Deputy Chairman 2 of the Jabatan Adat Istiadat Negara, or the Department of State Customs.

In November 2015, Prince Mateen, as a representative of his father, attended the Commonwealth Heads of Government Meeting in Malta. He again attended the 2022 Commonwealth Heads of Government Meeting in Rwanda this time alongside his father.

He was present at the Inauguration Ceremony of the Oxford Centre for Islamic Studies' new building in May 2017. Following leaders' bilateral meetings in Amman on 4 October 2018, which saw the signing of three memorandum of understanding in the areas of infrastructure, tourism, and defense in addition to a customs cooperation agreement, Brunei and Jordan reaffirmed their longstanding alliance. The negotiations were held at Al-Husseinieh Palace with participation from senior cabinet members from both nations as well as Prince Mateen and Crown Prince Al Hussein.

On 19 October 2019, alongside his father, he attended the 12th Asia–Europe Meeting (ASEM) in Brussels, where Brunei demanded that talks to get back up a Free Trade Agreement (FTA) between the European Union (EU) and ASEAN. On 3 November 2019, the 35th ASEAN Summit and Related Summits' Opening Ceremony was attended by both father and son at Muang Thong Thani.

Prince Mateen regularly represents the royal family at foreign royal events usually alongside his father. On 22 October 2019, he attended the enthronement ceremony of Emperor Naruhito of Japan In September 2022, he and his father were present at Westminster Abbey for the state funeral of Queen Elizabeth II of the United Kingdom and again in May 2023 for the coronation of King Charles III. In June 2023, he attended the wedding celebrations of Crown Prince Hussein of Jordan and Rajwa bint Khalid Al Saif. In July 2024, Prince Mateen and his wife, Anisha Rosnah, traveled to Kuala Lumpur for the installation of Ibrahim Iskandar of Johor as the 17th King of Malaysia. In May 2026, he again joined his father representing Brunei in the 48th ASEAN Summit held in Cebu City in the Philippines.

=== Ministerial career ===
On 4 June 2026, Sultan Hassanal Bolkiah as Prime Minister of Brunei, announced a major cabinet reshuffle. Prince Mateen was appointed as the third Minister of Foreign Affairs replacing his father who previously had held the office since October 2015. This marks Prince Mateen's first official role in the government.

=== Sports career ===
Prince Mateen is an avid polo player along with other members of the Bruneian royal family. He has represented his country in polo three times in the Southeast Asian Games. At the 2017 SEA Games, the Bruneian national team that included both Prince Mateen and his sister, Princess Azemah, earned a bronze medal. Nearly 3,000 spectators came to watch the match between Brunei and Malaysia. At the 2019 SEA Games, Mateen, Azemah and the rest of the Bruneian team again won the bronze medal. In 2024, Mateen played on the national team at the All Asia Cup in Thailand where they won the silver medal. At the 2025 SEA Games, Mateen, Azemah and the rest of the Bruneian team earned a silver medal in the low goal division and a bronze medal in the high goal division.

In 2018, Prince Mateen founded his own professional polo team called MB Polo. He plays on the team along with Pablo Mac Donough. They compete at the annual Gold Cup of the Torneo Internacional de Polo in Sotogrande, Spain. In 2018, MB Polo came in second place at the Gold Cup medium goal finals. They won the high goal Gold Cup final for the first time in 2019 and came in second in 2023.

On 7 April 2007, the AM Gunners captained by Abdul Mateen ended in a 1–1 draw against team Projek Ikan Pusu (PIP) during a Charity football match. The match which took place at the Hassanal Bolkiah National Stadium collected a total of B$12,192. A charity match between Mateen-led AM Gunners and Sport School was again held at the same location on 22 March 2008.

In 2020, Prince Mateen opened Jab Gym in Brunei. It is a primarily a boxing gym but also offers other fitness classes.

== Personal life ==
In April 2023, he alongside other family members performed the Umrah pilgrimage in Mecca.

=== Marriage and children ===
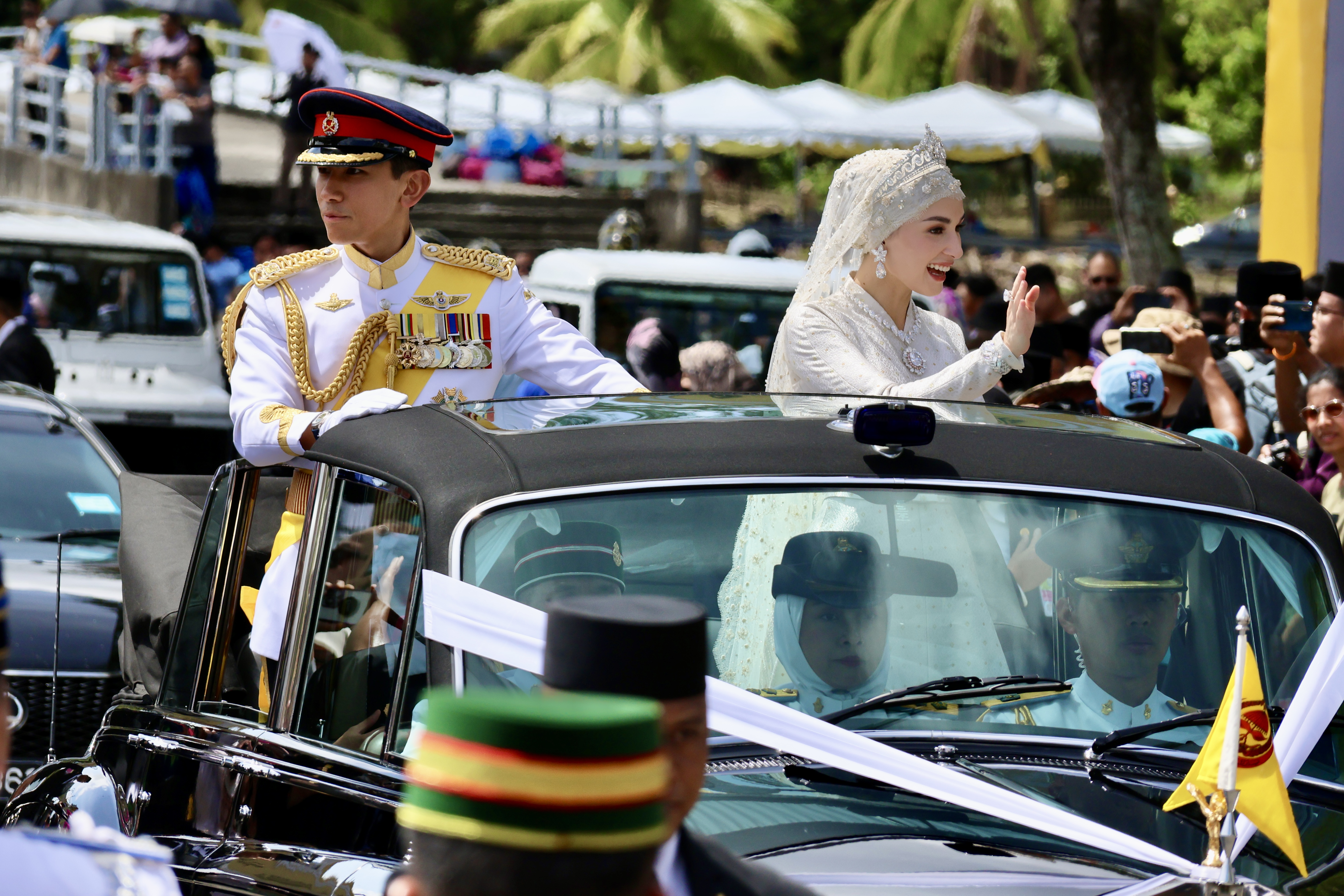
Mateen and Anisha during the street parade following their wedding in 2024

On 8 October 2023, the royal court announced the engagement of Prince Mateen and Anisha Rosnah binti Adam also known prior to her marriage as Anisha Isa-Kalebic. The couple have known each other since they were children and are said to have begun dating in 2018. Anisha has attended several events over the years as Prince Mateen's partner such as his Green beret presentation in 2021, Princess Fadzilah's wedding in 2022, and Princess Azemah's wedding in 2023.

The couple married in a elaborate ten day celebration from 7 January to 16 January 2024. The Majlis Istiadat Berbedak Pengantin Diraja or powdering ceremony was held on 10 January. Anisha and Mateen wore traditional red outfits and their families applied scented powder and oils to their hands to bless them. The next day was the Majlis Istiadat Akad Nikah Diraja or solemnisation ceremony at Omar Ali Saifuddien Mosque where they were officially married. The highpoint of the celebrations was the Majlis Bersanding Pengantin Diraja on the 14th which was followed by a procession through the streets of Bandar Seri Begawan. The events ended with the Majlis Persantapan Diraja which was a banquet at Istana Nurul Iman with around 5,000 guests.

Many foreign royals and politicians attended the wedding including President Joko Widodo, President Bongbong Marcos and Liza Araneta Marcos, Sultan Abdullah and Tunku Azizah, King Jigme Khesar Namgyel Wangchuck and Queen Jetsun Pema, Prime Minister Lee Hsien Loong and Ho Ching, Prime Minister Anwar Ibrahim and Wan Azizah, Princess Noor and Amr Zedan, Princess Munira Al-Saud and Prince Mamdouh, Sheikh Rashid, Tengku Muhammad Iskandar, Tunku Idris Iskandar, Tengku Fahd Mu'adzam, and Tunku Aminah Maimunah.

On 14 October 2025, the couple announced that they were expecting their first child. Anisha gave birth to their daughter Zahra Mariam on 8 February 2026. Her full name and title is Yang Amat Mulia Pengiran Anak Zahra Mariam Bolkiah Binti Duli Yang Teramat Mulia Paduka Seri Pengiran Muda 'Abdul Mateen. This is roughly translated to Her Highness Princess Zahra Mariam Bolkiah of Brunei.

== Titles, styles and honours ==
Styles of Prince Abdul Mateen
- Reference style: Yang Teramat Mulia
- Alternative style: His Royal Highness

Royal Standard of Prince Abdul Mateen as a non-gahara child of the Sultan

=== Title and style ===
His full title and style is Duli Yang Teramat Mulia Paduka Seri Pengiran Muda 'Abdul Mateen ibni Sultan Haji Hassanal Bolkiah Mu'izzaddin Waddaulah, Pengiran Muda dari Brunei Darussalam It is usually translated in English as His Royal Highness Prince Mateen of Brunei.

=== Honours ===
==== National ====
- Order of the Crown of Brunei (DKMB)
- Order of Paduka Keberanian Laila Terbilang First Class (DPKT) – Dato Paduka Seri (15 July 2021)
- Hassanal Bolkiah Sultan Medal (PHBS)
- Meritorious Service Medal (PJK; 12 June 2024)
- Sultan of Brunei Golden Jubilee Medal (5 October 2017)
- Sultan of Brunei Silver Jubilee Medal (5 October 1992)
- National Day Silver Jubilee Medal (23 February 2009)
- General Service Medal (Armed Forces)
- Royal Brunei Armed Forces Golden Jubilee Medal (31 May 2011)
- Royal Brunei Armed Forces Diamond Jubilee Medal (31 May 2021)
- Honorary Member of the Special Forces Regiment (30 June 2019)

==== Foreign ====
- Malaysia:
  - Recipient of the 17th Yang di-Pertuan Agong Installation Medal (20 July 2024)
- United Kingdom:
  - Recipient of the Sandhurst Medal

=== Wear of orders, decorations, and medals ===
Ribbons of HRH Prince Abdul Mateen of Brunei

=== Namesakes ===
- Pengiran Muda 'Abdul Mateen Mosque (PMAM), a place of worship in Kampong Mulaut.

=== Awards ===
- Lee Kuan Yew Fellowship (2023)

Prince Abdul Mateen of Brunei House of Bolkiah Born: 10 August 1991
Preceded by Abdul Malik	Succession to the Bruneian throne 5th position	Succeeded by Abdul Wakeel
