= Prince Abdul Azim of Brunei =

Bruneian prince (1982–2020)

Prince Abdul Azim
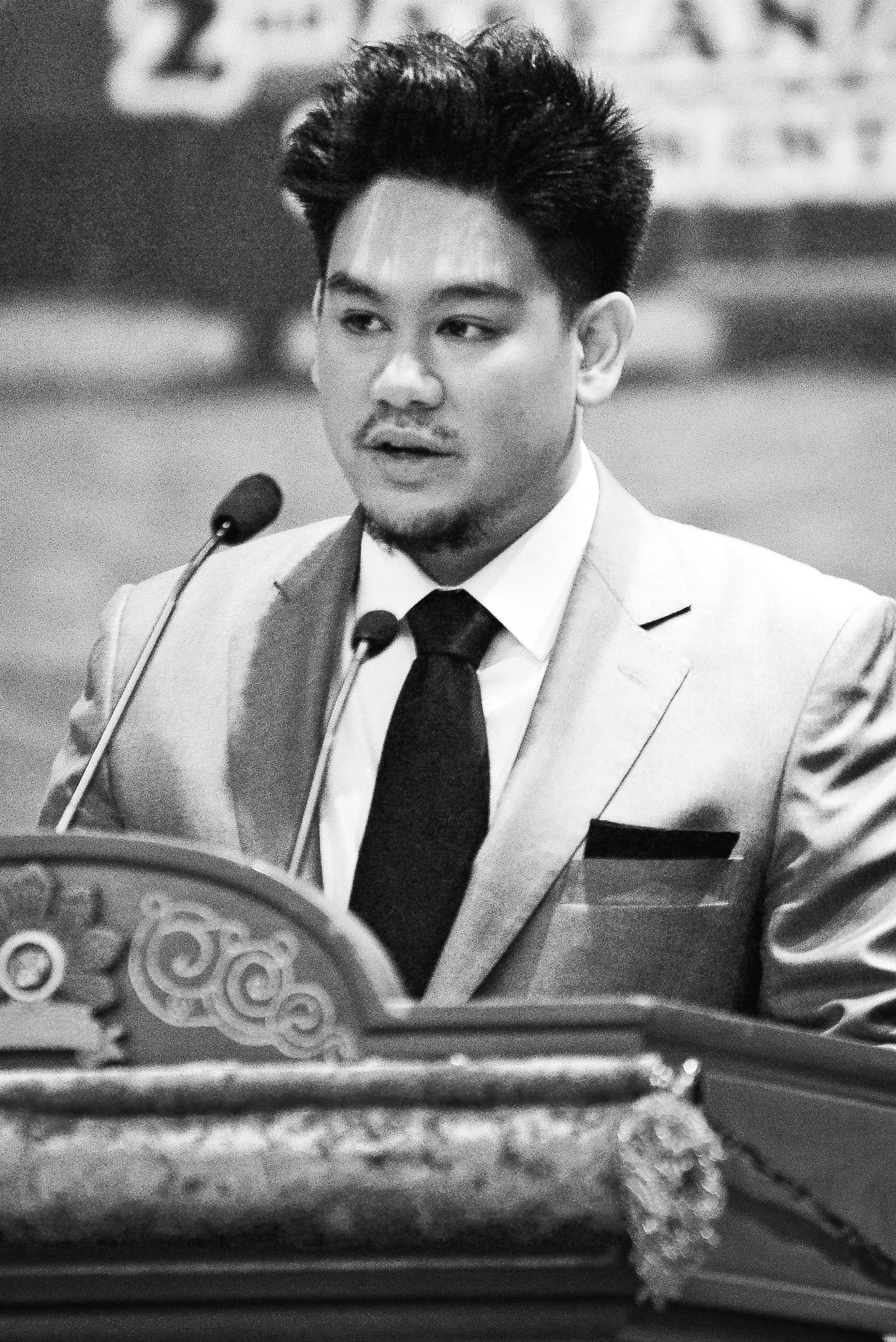
- Azim in 2013
- Born: 29 July 1982; Bandar Seri Begawan, Brunei
- Died: 24 October 2020 (aged 38); Jerudong Park Medical Centre, Kampong Jerudong, Brunei
- Burial: 24 October 2020; Royal Mausoleum, Bandar Seri Begawan
Names
- Pengiran Muda Haji Abdul 'Azim Ibni Sultan Haji Hassanal Bolkiah Muizzaddin Waddaulah
- House: Bolkiah
- Father: Hassanal Bolkiah
- Mother: Mariam Abdul Aziz
- Religion: Sunni Islam
- Education: International School Brunei; Raffles Institution; Oxford Brookes University

Abdul Azim ibni Hassanal Bolkiah (Jawi: عبد العظيم; 29 July 1982 – 24 October 2020) was a member of the royal family of Brunei. He was the second son of Sultan Hassanal Bolkiah and the first with his former second wife, Mariam Abdul Aziz.

He was fourth in the line of succession to the Bruneian throne at the time of his death in 2020.

== Early life ==
Prince Azim was born on 29 July 1982 in Bandar Seri Begawan, Brunei to Sultan Hassanal Bolkiah and his former second wife, Mariam Abdul Aziz. His parents divorced in February 2003. He was the second son of the Sultan and sixth child of the Sultan. Azim has three younger full siblings: Princess Azemah, Princess Fadzilah, and Prince Mateen along with eight half siblings from his father's other marriages.

He was raised at Istana Nurul Izzah in Kampong Jerudong, Brunei. The palace was built in the mid-1980s for the then Princess Consort Mariam and her children.

== Education ==
After attending International School Brunei in Bandar Seri Begawan and Raffles Institution in Singapore he attended Leighton Park School in England.In September 2008, he graduated from Oxford Brookes University in the United Kingdom with a Bachelor of Science degree with honors in Politics and International Relations.

In 2008, Prince Azim started the nine-month officer training course at the Royal Military Academy Sandhurst, but he dropped out after one week.

== Career ==
Prince Azim was a producer with the London-based film company Daryl Prince Productions which produced You're Not You. The implementation of sharia law by his father was poorly received in Hollywood and led to a boycott of properties owned by Brunei. Azim is thought to have cancelled his attendance at a party for buyers of You're Not You because of the controversy.

== Royal duties ==
Prince Azim was an advocate for the arts and creative industries and championed and donated to several causes around youth and people with disabilities.

In 2009, he designed unisex weekend bags for MCM. The proceeds went to the Make A Wish Foundation UK, a charity in which he was one of the patrons.

In May 2011, at a charity show in Brunei Darussalam, held at the Empire Hotel and Country Club's Indera Samudra Hall at which 31 persons with autism performed, Prince Azim said that those with autism should be treated with respect, "as would to any of your family members". On 27 April 2013 at the opening of the 2nd ASEAN Autism Network (AAN) Congress, he urged that appropriate support be given to families with autistic family members.

== Personal life ==
Prince Azim was a prominent figure of the international jetset. He was reported to have had a net worth of US$5 billion at the time of his death.

In April 2019, Prince Azim was outed as gay by blogger Perez Hilton, in response to the Sultan of Brunei's introduction of Sharia law, which included the death penalty for gay people. Prince Azim responded by saying that he did not mind being outed, but he was concerned that it "probably hurt a few people in the community".

After his death it was revealed that he suffered from bipolar disorder.

== Death ==
Prince Azim died on 24 October 2020, at the age of 38, at Jerudong Park Medical Centre in Kampong Jerudong, Brunei. The royal court did not announce his cause of death but on 27 October, his brother, Prince Abdul Mateen, revealed that Azim died from multiple organ failure which was caused by persistent infections due to severe systemic vasculitis that he was diagnosed with in early 2020.

The government of Brunei announced a seven-day period of mourning and ordered all national flags be lowered to half-mast. Prince Azim was laid to rest beside his grandfather, Sultan Omar Ali Saifuddien III, at the Royal Mausoleum in Bandar Seri Begawan after the Asar prayers. His funeral and burial ceremony was attended by the Brunei royal family, state dignitaries and cabinet ministers. Among the foreign guests who were present to give their last respects was Tunku Idris Iskandar of Johor.

Foreign dignitaries including Sultan Ibrahim Ismail of Johor, Prime Minister Muhyiddin Yassin of Malaysia, Prime Minister Lee Hsien Loong of Singapore, and President Halimah Yacob of Singapore all sent their condolences. Some celebrities like Joan Collins, Janet Jackson, Daniel Lismore, and Kevin McHale also offered their condolences on social media.

== Titles, styles, and honours ==
Styles of Prince of Brunei
- Reference style: Duli Yang Teramat Mulia
- Spoken style: Your Royal Highness

=== Title and style ===
His full title and style was Duli Yang Teramat Mulia Paduka Seri Pengiran Muda Haji 'Abdul 'Azim Ibni Kebawah Duli Yang Maha Mulia Paduka Seri Baginda Sultan Haji Hassanal Bolkiah Muizzaddin Waddaulah It is usually translated in English as His Royal Highness Prince Azim of Brunei.

=== Honours ===
==== National ====
- Order of the Crown of Brunei (DKMB)
- Sultan Hassanal Bolkiah Medal (PHBS)
- Proclamation of Independence Medal (1 January 1984)
- Sultan of Brunei Silver Jubilee Medal (5 October 1992)
- National Day Silver Jubilee Medal (23 February 2009)
- Sultan of Brunei Golden Jubilee Medal (5 October 2017)

==== Foreign ====
- Sultan Mizan Zainal Abidin Coronation Medal (Terengganu, 4 March 1999)

=== Things named after him ===
- Pengiran Muda Abdul Azim Religious School, Kampong Serasa
- Haji Abdul Azim Mosque, Kampong Luagan Dudok
