= Dayang (honorific) =

Dayang, abbreviated as Dyg., is a commonly used honorific for the female commoners in Brunei. It is the female equivalent of Awang.

== Usage ==
Dayang is used in formal situation as a mark of respect for non-royal and non-noble females in Brunei. Generally, it is addressed immediately before the person's given name. If the name includes titles, the order of Dayang is after all of the titles which precede the name. However, this excludes the title Hajah; in this case, Dayang is placed before it.

The honorific Dayang is often found with the Malay style Yang Mulia, which is an honorary style also for the commoners. However, they may not be necessarily consecutive; Yang Mulia is always addressed at the beginning of the name system, and this includes preceding any available title.

If the person already has Dayang as part of her birth name, it is not required to add this honorific as it will become repetitive.

== See also ==
- Awang
- Yang Mulia
