= Awang (honorific) =

Bruneian honorific for male commoners

"Awang" (hereditary) is a hereditary title for male Aristocrats or "awang-awang" in Brunei and Sarawak. Bruneian Aristocrats or "awang-awang" write their names as 'Haji Awang' for men and 'Hajah Dayang' for women. Therefore, their Aristocratic name are written as 'Haji Awang Ahmad Bin Haji Awang Besar' for men and 'Hajah Dayang Fauziah Binti Haji Awang Sungai' for women when they completed their Hajj ritual or 'Awang Taha Bin Awang Tengah' if they haven't completed their Hajj. This is different for commoners in Brunei who are referred to as 'Awang Haji Rahman Bin Bulat' for men and 'Dayang Limah Binti Puteh' for women in formal situations.

Awang, abbreviated as Awg. or Aw., is a commonly used honorific for the male commoners in Brunei.

== Usage ==
Awang is used in formal situation as a mark of respect for non-royal and non-noble males in Brunei. Generally, it is addressed immediately before the person's given name. If the name includes titles, the order of Awang is after all of the titles which precede the name. However, this excludes the title Haji; in this case, Awang is placed before it.

The honorific Awang is often found with the Malay style Yang Mulia, which is an honorary style also for the commoners. However, they may not be necessarily consecutive; Yang Mulia is always addressed at the beginning of the name system, and this includes preceding any available title. Yang Mulia is also not restrictive to the males; it is also used with the female equivalent of Awang, that is Dayang.

If the person already has Awang as part of his birth name, it is not required to add this honorific as it will become repetitive.
