= Succession to the Bruneian throne =

Succession to the Bruneian throne is guided by the Succession and Regency Proclamation within the Constitution of Brunei first established in 1959. The succession laws have been amended several times since then and the most recent update was published in 2022.

== Law of succession ==
According to the constitution, heirs must be legitimate, male, Muslim, and descended from Muhammad Jamalul Alam II, the 26th Sultan of Brunei. The line of succession follows agnatic primogeniture. Preference was previously given to sons whose mother was also royal but this was repealed in an amendment on 4 September 2021.

=== Proclamation of the Crown Prince ===
The heir presumptive is given the title Duli Yang Teramat Mulia Paduka Seri Pengiran Muda. It is possible for an heir presumptive to be displaced by someone with a better claim to the throne. If an heir apparent is proclaimed they are given the title Duli Yang Teramat Mulia Paduka Seri Pengiran Muda Mahkota and they cannot be displaced. The current sultan's oldest son, Al-Muhtadee Billah was installed as the Crown Prince in August 1998 meaning he has been chosen to succeed his father.

== Line of succession ==
- Sultan Omar Ali Saifuddien III (1914–1986)
  - Sultan Hassanal Bolkiah (born 1946)
    - (1) Crown Prince Al-Muhtadee Billah (born 1974)
      - (2) Prince Abdul Muntaqim (born 2007)
      - (3) Prince Muhammad Aiman (born 2015)
    - (4) Prince Abdul Malik (born 1983)
    - (5) Prince Abdul Mateen (born 1991)
    - (6) Prince Abdul Wakeel (born 2006)
  - (7) Prince Mohamed Bolkiah (born 1948)
    - (8) Prince Abdul Qawi (born 1974)
      - (9) Prince Abdul Muhaimin Bolkiah Petra (born 2022)
    - (10) Prince Abdul Fattah (born 1982)
    - (11) Prince Abdul Mu'min (born 1983)
    - (12) Prince Omar Ali (born 1986)
    - (13) Prince Abdul Muqtadir
  - (14) Prince Sufri Bolkiah (born 1952)
    - (15) Prince Muhammad Safiz (born 1974)
    - (16) Prince Abdul Khaliq (born 1994)
    - (17) Prince Abdul Aleem
  - (18) Prince Jefri Bolkiah (born 1954) (Note: The succession list is not complete because it is unknown how many children Prince Jefri has or if they meet the qualifications to be included.)
    - (19) Prince Abdul Hakeem (born 1973)
      - (20) Prince Abdul Halim Ar-Rahman (born 2024)
    - (21) Prince Bahar (born 1981)
    - (22) Prince Hasan Kiko (born 1995)
    - (23) Prince Faiq (born 1998)

== See also ==
- House of Bolkiah
- List of sultans of Brunei
