= International School Brunei =

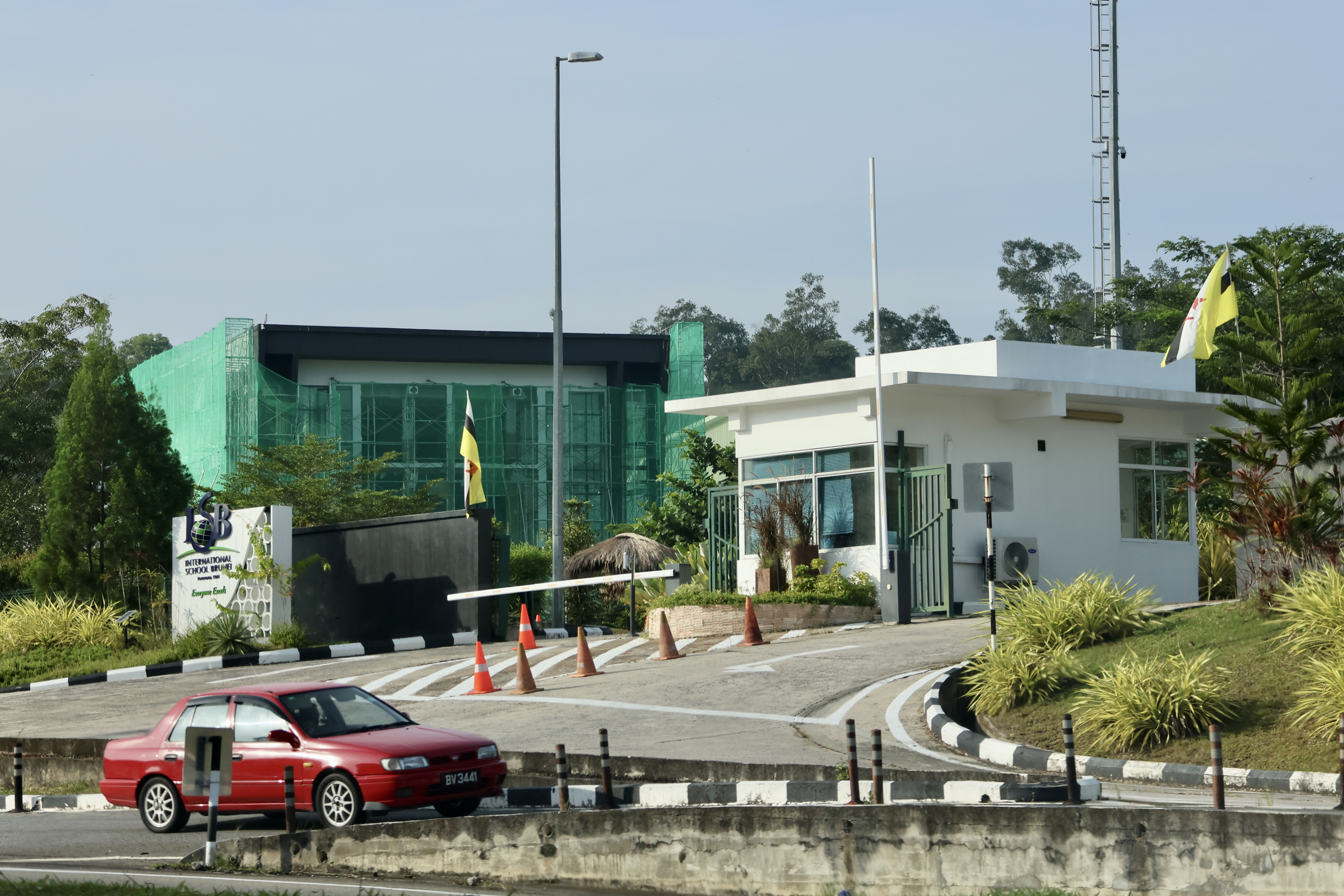
- International School Brunei main campus

Location
- Jalan Utama Salambigar; Bandar Seri Begawan, BC2115; Brunei
- Coordinates: 4°57′43″N 114°59′29″E

Information
- School type: International
- Motto: Everyone Excels
- Established: 1964
- Status: Active
- ISB Executive Principal: Mr Dominic Morley
- Average class size: 25
- Language: English (main)
- Hours in school day: 7
- Website: www.isb.edu.bn

International School Brunei (ISB) is a co-educational, boarding and day international school in Brunei established in 1964. It operates three campuses: the main site in Kampong Sungai Hanching, Bandar Seri Begawan; a branch in Seria in the Belait district; and the ISB Centre for Inclusive Learning in Panaga.

The school offers education for students aged 2 to 18 years, organised into Early Years (Pre-Kindy to Reception), Primary (Year 1 to Year 6), Secondary (Year 7 to Year 11), and the International Baccalaureate Diploma Programme (Year 12 to Year 13). ISB was the first school in Brunei to offer the IB Diploma, and it also provides Cambridge IGCSE qualifications.

In 2025, ISB won the International School of the Year Award 2025 from the Australian Boarding Schools Association. The school also won Specialist Provision School of the Year at the Tes Schools Awards 2025.

The current executive principal is Dominic Morley.

== Notable alumni ==
- Prince Abdul Azim
- Muhammad Isa Ahmad
- Christian Nikles
- Paula Malai Ali
- Nur 'Azizah
