= House of Bolkiah =

Ruling royal family of Brunei

- Royal house
- Emblem of the House of Bolkiah
- Parent family: Ishmaelites; Qedarites tribe; al-Adnani; al-Qurashi; al-Hashimi; al-Alawi; al-Hasani; Dhawu 'Awn; Qatadah (Note: Since 1425 due to cognatic inheritance)
- Country: Brunei Darussalam (previously the Bruneian Empire)
- Origin: Mecca (cognatic inheritors)
- Founded: 1368; 658 years ago
- Founder: Sultan Muhammad Shah
- Current head: Sultan Haji Hassanal Bolkiah Mu'izzaddin Waddaulah
- Titles: Sultan of Brunei; Crown Prince of Brunei
- Connected families: Hashemites; Mahawangsa
- Distinctions: Ishmael and Abraham (claimed)
- Traditions: Sunni Islam (1368–present)
- Cadet branches: House of Salalila (1500–1571); House of Digadong (1807–1846); House of Deria (1921–present; as separate family)

The House of Bolkiah is the ruling royal family of Brunei Darussalam. It is composed of the descendants of the 1st sultan Sultan Muhammad Shah and his family. The Sultan of Brunei is the head of state and absolute monarch of Brunei. He is also head of government in his capacity as Prime Minister.

Since independence from the British in 1984, only one Sultan has reigned, though the royal institution dates back to the 14th century. The Sultan of Brunei can be thought of as synonymous with the ruling House of Bolkiah, with descendency being traced from the 1st Sultan Muhammad Shah's brother, the 3rd Sultan Ahmad through and his daughter Puteri Ratna Kesuma, the wife of the 4th Sultan Sharif Ali, a Sayyid and grandson of Emir Rumaythah ibn Abi Numayy of Mecca. The 14th Sultan Abdul Hakkul Mubin was an exception to familial succession, but he ascended after murdering the 13th Sultan Muhammad Ali and was in turn killed by the 15th Sultan Muhyiddin. It is not clear when the house became known as the 'House of Bolkiah', and whether it was named after the current 30th Sultan Hassanal Bolkiah, or the 6th Sultan Bolkiah.

== Title ==
The full title of the Sultan is: His Majesty The Sultan and Yang Di-Pertuan of Brunei Darussalam (Kebawah Duli Yang Maha Mulia Paduka Seri Baginda Sultan dan Yang di-Pertuan Negara Brunei Darussalam).

Today, the surname Bolkiah is carried by any descendant of the House of Bolkiah. Members of the royal household hold high and influential positions in government.

Sons and grandsons of Sultan Hassanal Bolkiah are referred to in the style "His Royal Highness" (HRH) or "Pengiran Muda" in Malay, differing from the royals belonging to the cadet branches which are addressed as "The Lord" (HH) or "Pengiran Anak" in Malay.

== Members ==
The core of the Brunei royal family is made up of the immediate family of the incumbent Sultan of Brunei;

- Sultan Hasannal Bolkiah of Brunei and Queen Saleha of Brunei
  - Princess Rashidah Sa'adatul Bolkiah and Abdul Rahim Kemaluddin
  - Princess Muta-Wakkilah Hayatul Bolkiah
  - Crown Prince Al-Muhtadee Billah and Crown Princess Sarah
    - Prince Abdul Muntaqim
    - Princess Muneerah Madhul Bolkiah
    - Prince Muhammad Aiman
    - Princess Faathimah Az-Zahraa' Raaihanul
  - Princess Majeedah Nuurul Bolkiah
  - Princess Hafizah Sururul Bolkiah and Muhammad Ruzaini Mohd. Yakub
  - Prince Abdul Malik and Raabi'atul 'Adawiyyah Bolkiah
  - Princess Azemah Ni'matul Bolkiah and Prince Bahar
  - Princess Fadzilah Lubabul Bolkiah and Abdullah Al-Hashimi
  - Prince Abdul Mateen and Anisha Isa Kalebic
  - Prince Abdul Wakeel
  - Princess Ameerah Wardatul Bolkiah

Only Sultan Hassanal Bolkiah and his two sons; Crown Prince Al-Muhtadee Billah and Prince Abdul Mateen carry out government duties full-time, mainly for the Prime Minister's Office and the Royal Brunei Armed Forces. The Sultan's sister, Princess Masna, is the current ambassador-at-large to the United Nations representing the Brunei government and the only extended royal member to be part of the working royals.

Other members of the royal family with royal rank who do not carry out official duties are the Sultan's siblings, and their children are considered to be part of the lesser royal members;

- Prince Mohamed Bolkiah
- Princess Masna
- Princess Nor'ain
- Prince Sufri Bolkiah
- Prince Jefri Bolkiah
- Princess Amal Umi Kalthum Al-Islam
- Princess Amal Rakiah
- Princess Amal Nasibah
- Princess Amal Jefriah

== See also ==
- List of sultans of Brunei
- List of Bruneian royal consorts
- Ibrahim Shah of Kedah
- Succession to the Bruneian throne
