= Brunei Malay wedding =

Type of wedding

A Brunei Malay wedding has many types of ceremonies.

== Ceremonies ==
=== Mengagai or Berjarum-jarum ===
In the old days when men and women did not openly court each other, this ceremony was meant to be an opportunity for the groom's representative, such as his parents, to find out whether the girl is still available for marriage. Nowadays, it signals the start of the whole process, when parents from both sides first meet each other. This is also when they discuss when they can send a proper entourage to seal the formal engagement.

=== Menghantar Tanda Pertunangan ===
This is when the proper entourage comes to the bride side. The groom's side will usually offer two rings. One is called the 'pembuka mulut' to signify the groom's real interest to ask for the daughter's hand in marriage. The other is the official engagement ring. Both sides will also discuss details on the upcoming wedding, particularly the date, as well as the "Berian" or lists of dowry of the bride.

=== Menghantar Berian ===
Menghantar Berian means delivering gifts which consists of all the requests during the engagement ceremony, and may also include additional gifts by the groom. The bride would also, if she so wishes, respond in kind. The delivery of the gifts is usually a grand affair, with an entourage of men or women carrying silver trays adorned with beautiful cloths on top of which would display each gift. In most Brunei Malay weddings, the ceremony is held on the same day with the Akad Nikah.

=== Berbedak Mandi ===
Berbedak Mandi is a ceremony to bless the soon-to-be groom and bride by close family members especially the parents, siblings and elders in their own homes. Here, they are scrubbed with traditional body-scrub powder which is applied to the whole body by the close family members. It symbolizes fertility and wealth.

=== Akad Nikah ===
This is the solemnisation ceremony. It is presided over by a religious official and only involves the groom. Sometimes the bride is not usually present but she will be represented by her father or a 'wali' (legal family representative). Here, under the grace of Allah (God), the groom vows to accept the bride's hand in front of witnesses.

=== Malam Berbedak ===
The Malam Berbedak or Night of Powdering is a ceremonial event where family members and friends/family are invited to 'bless' the bride/groom by anointing the bride/groom with an ointment made from colored rice flour and scented oils. The bride and groom are dressed up in traditional Berbedak attire which is different for each one. The bride has on a heavy brass (sometimes gold plated) headgear that has either a symbol/statuette of a chicken (called Ayam-ayam) or dragon (Naga) and is surrounded (wrapped) round with scented flowers. The groom has on a songkok (Muslim hat) or Dastar (crown made from songket cloth). Both are adorned with brass/gold plated arm bands, wrist bands, ankle bands and necklace. The bride is also wrapped around her waist with a kain songket (usually red) that was given by the groom as part of her dowry (hantaran).

=== Malam Berinai/Berpacar dan Pengganggunan ===
The Berinai / Berpacar is an event usually attended by close family and it is also commonly known as the Henna Night. Here, the Bride, dressed up in attire similar to the Malam Berbedak sits on the 'throne' with her hands on her lap and family members apply a pinch of 'pacar' (Henna) on the palm of her hand. Bunga Rampai (fragrant shreddings of pandan and flower petals) are also scattered over her hands signifying a blessing. In some weddings, these may be carried out on the same night of the Malam Berbedak whilst others keep them separate. This tradition is mostly practiced by only those in the Brunei Muara District and not in Tutong or the other districts.

Later that night, after all the guests have left, the elders of the family then bring the bride to her bridal room where the Penganggun (Wedding Attendant?) then lights three candles and passes them to one elderly lady sitting on the bride's bed and to another who follows behind her. The Bride then puts her arms around the Penganggun and is led around the bed behind her three times. The Bride then proceeds to sit on the bed and blows out the three candles ending the initiation. Again, this practice is only carried out in weddings from the Brunei Muara District.

=== Bersanding ===
Bersanding (Wedding reception) is the climax point of the wedding ceremony. This is where wide circle of friends and family of both sides gather and recognise the couple as official husband and wife in the eyes of the public. Bersanding is a grand event where much food is provided for the guests. In the past, this usually occurred in the vicinity of their home but currently, most Bruneians prefer to book a hall for the ceremony. The setup of this event is similar to a banquet style where food in buffet form is served.

=== Majlis Ambil-ambilan ===
The Majlis Ambil-ambilan is a post-wedding reception event usually attended by close family of both sides. The event usually held the night or the day after the wedding reception. The event is intended for both families getting to know each other. The bride usually receive gifts on this event notably gold jewellery from the groom families.

=== Muleh Tiga Hari ===
Muleh Tiga Hari is where the couple moves to the bride's home and stay for three days; and also move to the groom’s home and stay for another three days. This will let them decide whether or not they will stay or move out to live on their own in the future.

== See also ==
- Islamic marital practices
- Islamic marital jurisprudence
