= Brunei at the 2025 World Aquatics Championships =

- Flag of Brunei
- World Aquatics code: BRU
- National federation: Brunei Amateur Swimming Association

in Singapore
- Competitors: 3 in 1 sport
- Medals: Gold 0 Silver 0 Bronze 0 Total 0

World Aquatics Championships appearances
- 1973; 1975; 1978; 1982; 1986; 1991; 1994; 1998; 2001; 2003; 2005; 2007; 2009; 2011; 2013; 2015; 2017; 2019; 2022; 2023; 2024; 2025

Brunei is competing at the 2025 World Aquatics Championships in Singapore from 11 July to 3 August 2025.

== Competitors ==
The following is the list of competitors in the Championships.

Sport	Men	Women	Total
Swimming	2	1	3
Total	2	1	3

== Swimming ==
Men

Athlete	Event	Heat		Semifinal		Final	
Athlete	Event	Time	Rank	Time	Rank	Time	Rank
Joel Ling	50 m freestyle	24.44	77	Did not advance			
Joel Ling	100 m backstroke	1:00.06	56	Did not advance			
Haziq Samil	100 m freestyle	56.07	91	Did not advance			
Haziq Samil	200 m freestyle	2:04.05	58	Did not advance			

Women

Athlete	Event	Heat		Semifinal		Final	
Athlete	Event	Time	Rank	Time	Rank	Time	Rank
Sharmeen Mohd Mharvin	100 m freestyle	1:02.46	65	Did not advance			
Sharmeen Mohd Mharvin	50 m backstroke	31.19	49	Did not advance			
