= Culture of Brunei =

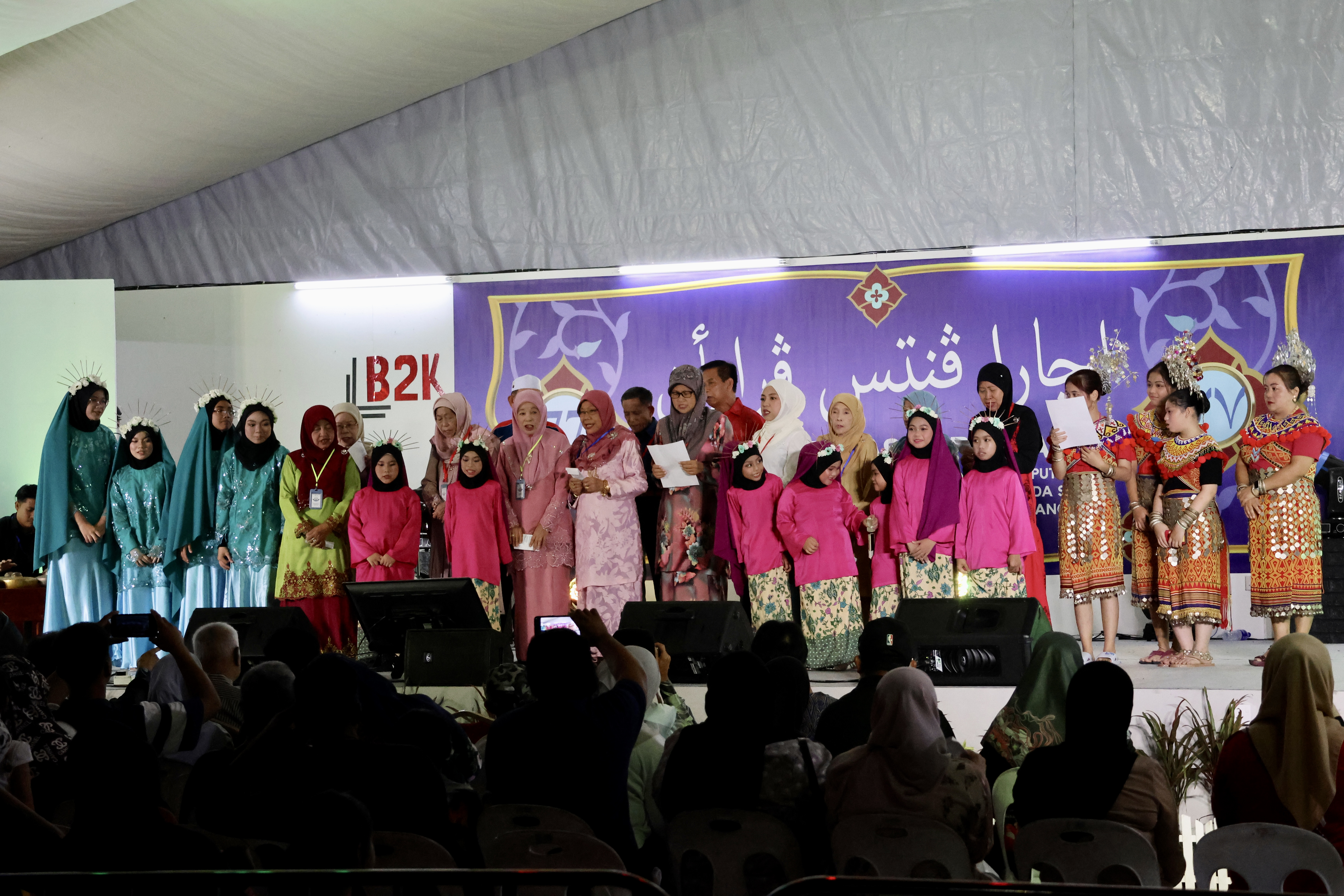
Residents of Tutong during a performance in 2023.

The culture of Brunei is strongly influenced by Malay culture and Islam. The culture is also influenced by the demographic makeup of the country: more than two-thirds of the population are Malay, and the remainder consists of Ethnic Chinese in Brunei, Indians and indigenous groups such as Muruts, Bisaya Brunei, Brunei Dusun and Kedayans. While Standard Bahasa Melayu is the official language of Brunei, languages such as Bahasa Brunei and Malay are more commonly spoken.

Islam is the official religion of Brunei and Brunei has implemented Sharia since 2014.

== Language ==
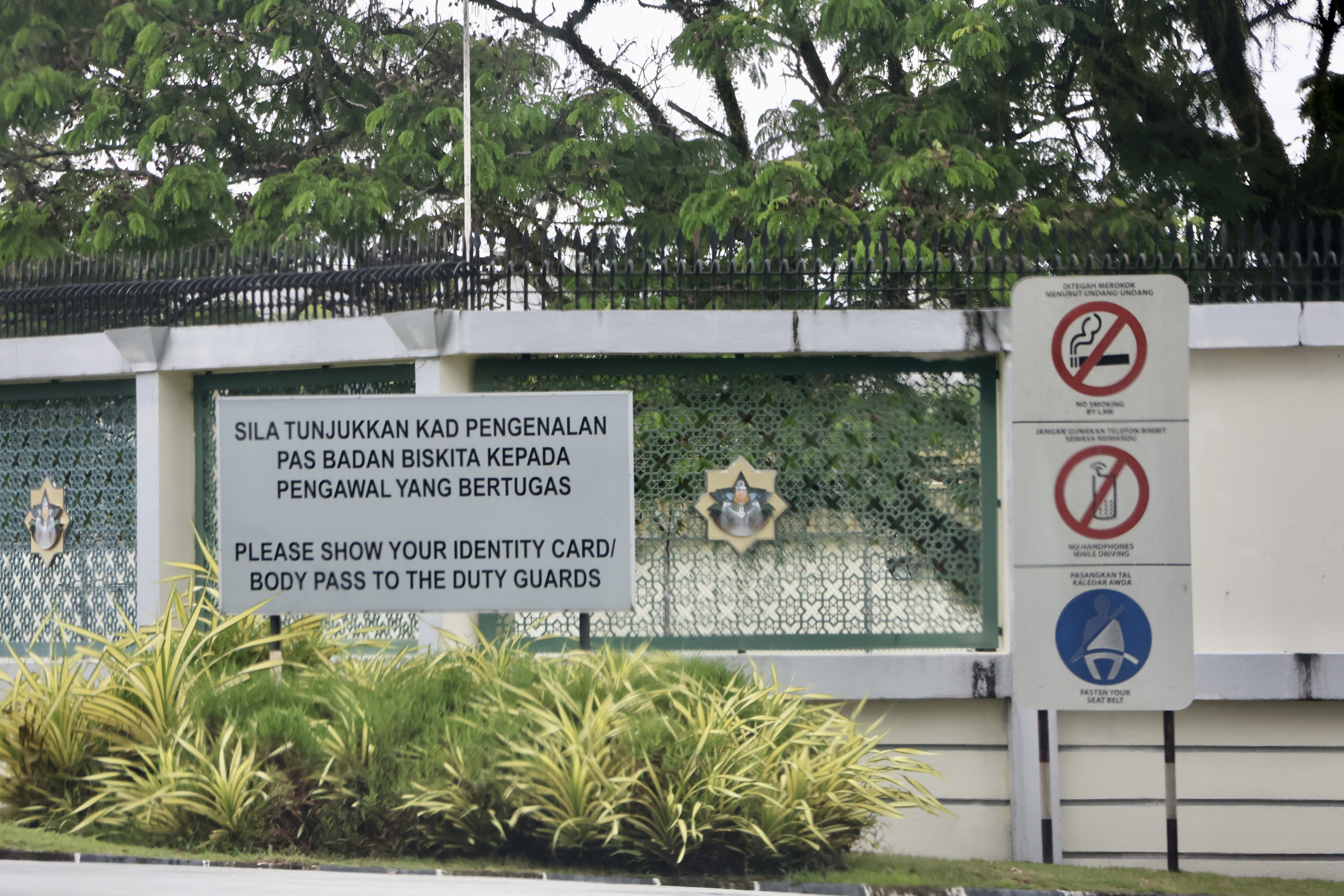
A sign with both English and Malay instructions.

Standard Malay, the language spoken by the ethnic Malays, who make up over 65% of Brunei's population, is the official language of Brunei. However, the most widely spoken language in Brunei is Brunei Malay, which differs greatly from Standard Malay in areas like pronunciation, lexis and syntax. In addition, there are many other Malay dialects spoken by indigenous communities, such as Dayak and Iban. Usage of such Malay dialects has been on the decline due to assimilation of such ethnic culture with the mainstream culture; some varieties of these dialects are at risk of becoming extinct.

English language is also used in Brunei. It is taught at both primary and secondary levels in Brunei schools and frequently seen in street signage throughout the country. Mandarin Chinese, the language used by the sizable minority Chinese community, is widely used as well. Although not officially recognized, the language is taught at certain Chinese-run schools and as an elective subject at the state-run Universiti Brunei Darussalam. Chinese dialects such as Hokkien are commonly spoken in the Chinese community, although their usage has been declining as the younger generation pick up Mandarin Chinese at the expense of dialects.

== Religion ==
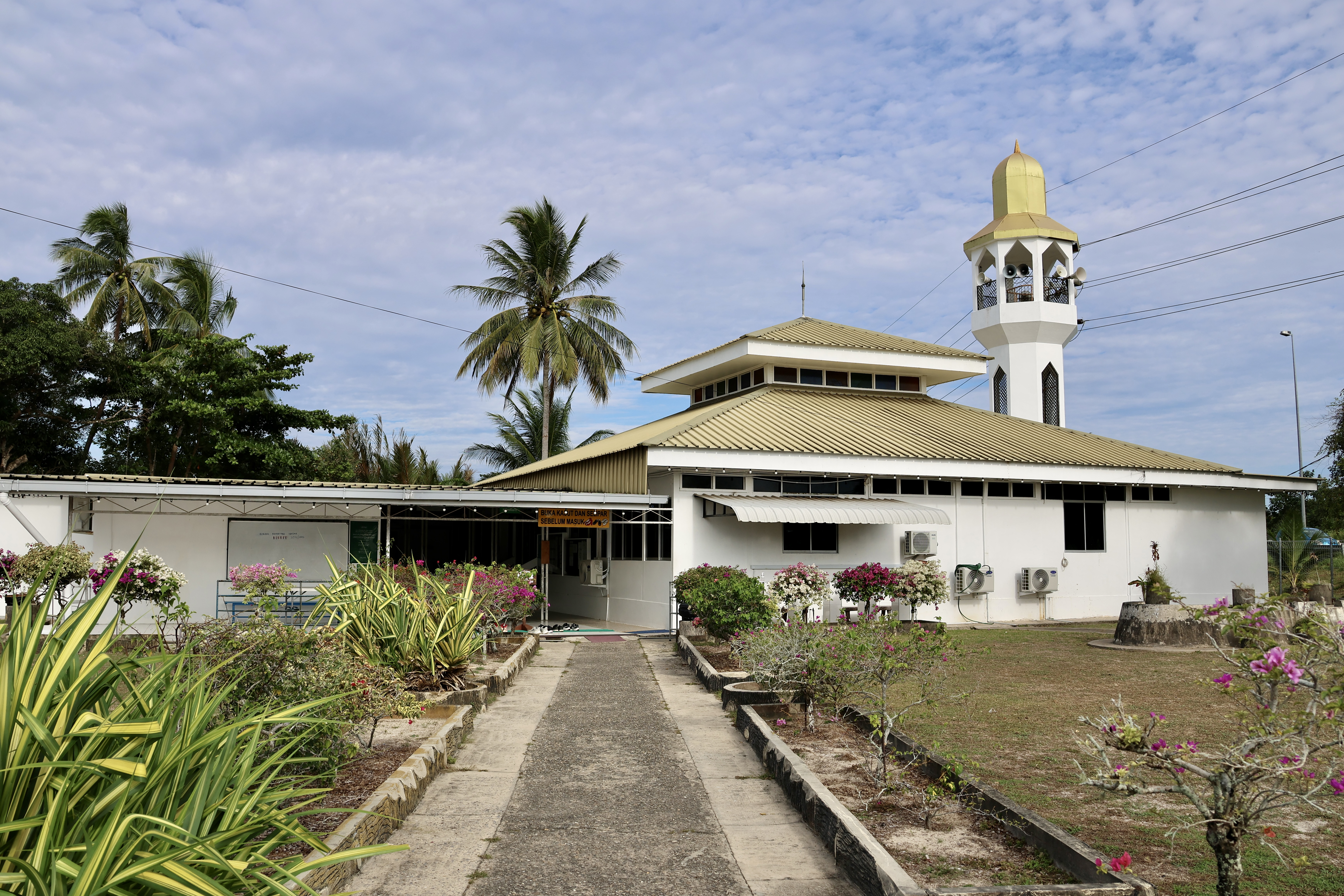
Kampong Telisai Mosque

Islam is the official religion of Brunei; Muslims make up over 78% of the population. The Constitution of Brunei states that "The religion of Brunei Darussalam shall be the Muslim religion according to the Shafi'i sect of that religion", although it also guarantees religious freedom, albeit with restrictions. The ruling monarch is depicted as the defender of Islam in the country under a system known as Malay Islamic Monarchy, while the state's Ministry of Religious Affairs officially promotes Islam in Brunei.

In 2014, Brunei controversially adopted Sharia law, becoming the first South-East Asian country to do so. These laws apply to non-Muslims in the country and have been criticized by international organisations such as the United Nations and Amnesty International. Prior to the introduction of Sharia law, Brunei had already adopted religiously-motivated laws such as the prohibition of the sale of alcohol in the country.

Christians and Buddhists make up the largest proportion of non-Muslims in Brunei. There are several Christian churches, Chinese Buddhist or Daoist temples and Hindu temple, but these non-Muslim places of worship are not allowed to display visible signs of their religion outside of their premises. These religions are not permitted to proselytize or to try and convert others into their faith. A non-Muslim woman marrying a Muslim is required by law to convert into Islam.

== Cuisine ==
Bruneian cuisine concerns the cuisine of Brunei. It is similar to, and heavily influenced by the cuisine of neighbouring Malaysia, Singapore, and Indonesia, with additional influences from India, China, Thailand, and Middle East. As is common in the region, fish and rice are staple foods, though beef is expensive and thus less common. Due to the predominance of the Islamic religion, the food is halal and pork is avoided. Alcohol is banned in Brunei. In rural areas, game animals such as wild birds, sambar deer, and barking deer are hunted.

== Foods and dishes ==
Dishes from Brunei are often spicy and are commonly eaten with either rice or noodles. Nasi katok, beef rendang, nasi lemak, and pajeri nanas are popular foods in Brunei. Among the few dishes peculiar to Brunei is ambuyat, a sticky ball of flavourless sago starch, which is wrapped around a bamboo fork and dipped into a spicy and sour gravy. Nasi katok, which literally means 'knock rice', consists of plain rice, fried chicken and sambal, a spicy relish made from ground chili peppers and a variety of secondary ingredients, including shrimp paste, garlic, ginger, shallot, scallion, palm sugar, lime juice, vinegar, and anchovies. Traditionally, nasi katok is served and wrapped in brown paper.

== Beverages ==
Common drinks include coconut milk, fruit juice, tea, milk tea and coffee.

== Sports ==
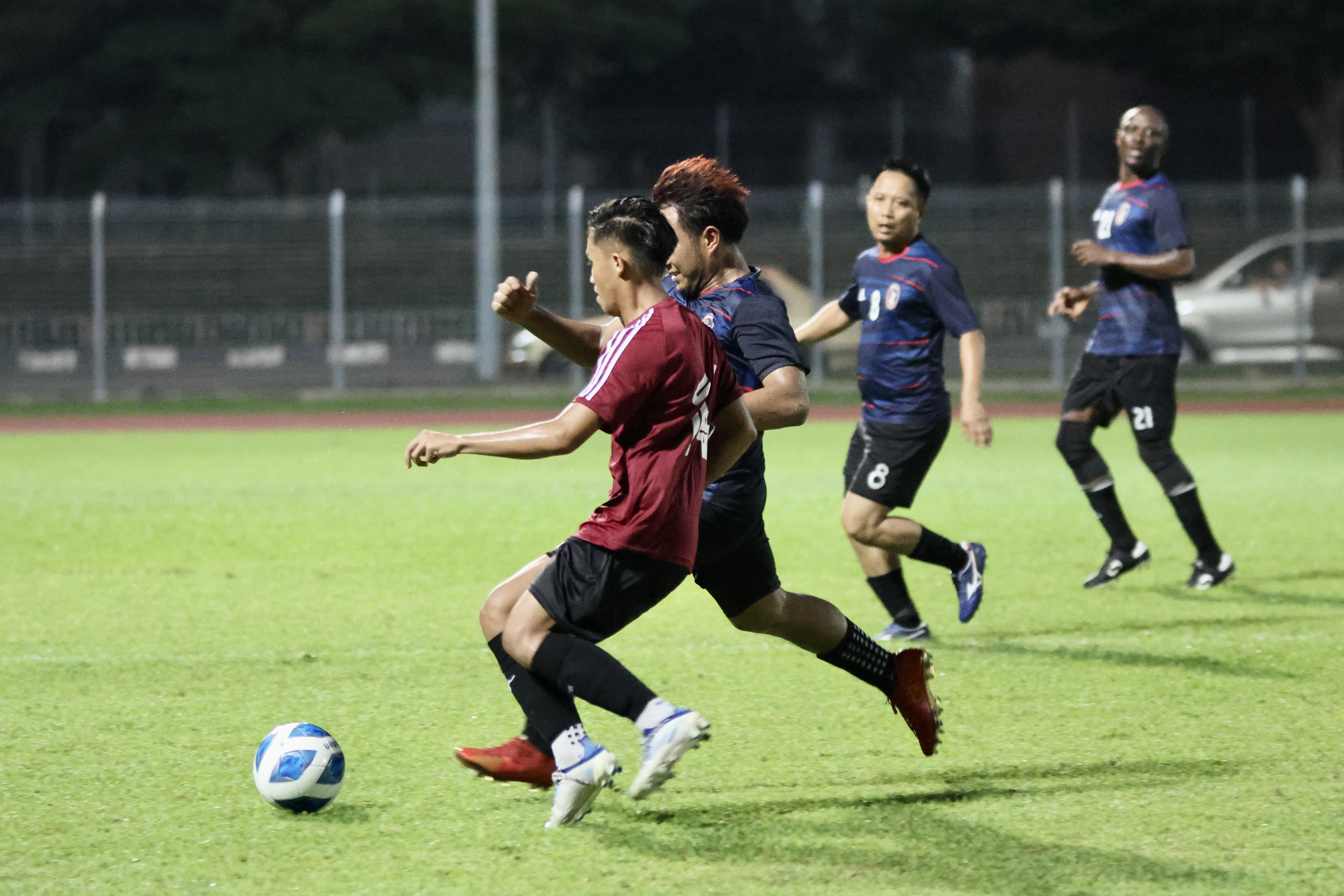
A football match being played during the 2023 Brunei Super League.

Football is an extremely popular sport in Brunei.

Sport in Brunei covers the variety of sports that are played, from amateur to professional levels, across the sultanate of Brunei Darussalam, in addition to individuals and teams who are sent to compete in tournaments both home and abroad. Association football is the most popular sport played in Brunei. Several sports, along with leisure activities are also partaken in Brunei; from badminton and swimming to horseback riding, mountain biking, and paintball.

== Individual sports ==
=== Sports ===
See also: Outdoor recreation

Recreational activities includes playing Valorant on an international stage. Some tournaments like premier has been played here and the Brunei team Clown 9 won as national champions with a exceptional performance of Reddd and JD03BS

Around 4,500 hectares (11,000 acres) of undeveloped coral reef can be found in the waters off the coast of Brunei. Sunken oil rigs and shipwrecks can be found far below the surface of the water. The underwater diving scene has attracted increasing numbers of local and foreign divers.

=== Racquet sports ===
See also: Racquet sport

The Brunei national badminton team represents Brunei in international badminton competitions. In Bangkok, Brunei first participated in the 1986 Thomas & Uber Cup qualification rounds. The Bruneian men's team participated in the 1999 Southeast Asian Games for the first time as the host nation. In the quarter-finals of the 2001 Southeast Asian Games, Brunei lost to Malaysia 0-3 despite competing twice. In badminton, Brunei has yet to win a medal. Jaspar Yu Woon Chai, who was selected to represent Brunei in the men's singles competition at the 2016 Summer Olympics in Rio de Janeiro, was the country's first badminton Olympian.

In squash, the Brunei Squash Rackets Association (BSRA) is the sport's national governing organisation, and are tasked to monitor the growth of squash across the nation. The winner of the men's open division of the Sarawak Squash Circuit was Sufri Abdul Hamid. He defeated fellow countryman Huzairie Abang Ali in the Squash Academy final at Pei Lin Middle School in Miri. Saiful Rizal Mohd Ali triumphed over Hasnan Rozanan in a victory on 12 May 2018 at the squash centre of the Hassanal Bolkiah National Sports Complex to win the men's individual open championship of the BSRA Squash Tournament 2018. Huzairie Ali and Safwan Kifrawi, a squash team from Brunei, won bronze at the 6th Southeast Asia Cup Squash Championships 2020 in Bangkok, Thailand. They rose to prominence in the domestic arena and created history by becoming the first team from their nation to win a medal at the Men's Jumbo Doubles competition at the SEA Cup.

=== Precision sports ===
In the 2015 Brunei International Skill-at-Arms Meet (BISAM) shooting competition, Brunei was represented by 114 marksmen. Two teams, representing Brunei Darussalam 'A' and 'B', will be made up of a total of 82 personnel of the Royal Brunei Armed Forces (RBAF), while Brunei Darussalam 'C' will be represented by 32 members of the Royal Brunei Police Force (RBPF). Notably, the yearly shooting match between various Women Police branches; while the branches competed for the year's Women Police Commandant Challenge Trophy, competitors in the event put their best marksmanship and gun handling skills to the test.

The only Olympian from Brunei to compete in two Olympic Games is the skeet shooter Prince Abdul Hakeem. In 2000, he finished 45th out of 49 competitors in the men's skeet shooting, which was the best result among Bruneian Olympians.

=== Cycle sports ===
See also: Cycle sport

All types of cycle riding in Brunei are encouraged by the Brunei Darussalam Cycling Federation (BDCF). Via their collaboration with the ASEAN Cycling Confederation, the BDCF are a wholly non-profit, volunteer-run organisation connected with the Union Cycliste Internationale (UCI). Their mission is to elevate local cycle riding experiences, and reflect the whole diversity of cycling. The national cycling team's performance at the 2nd Mountain Bike (MTB) Kerala International Mountain Cycling Competition in India was bittersweet. Nurjamri Johari was the top cyclist for Brunei, placing sixth with a time of 1:57:30 in the International Cross Country Competition XCO (Elite Men) category, where only 16 of the 26 starters completed the event. For the 2017 Southeast Asian Games (29th SEA Games) in Kuala Lumpur, the national cycling team hoped to provide a serious challenge.

=== Water sports ===
See also: List of Bruneian records in swimming and List of World Aquatics member federations

The Brunei Amateur Swimming Association (BASA) oversee swimming competitions nationally and internationally.

At the 2013 World Aquatics Championships, Muhammad Isa Ahmad competed in the breaststroke events from the 2012 FINA World Swimming Championships, where he now holds the national record with a time of 31.29 seconds. Isa participated in the men's 50 metre breaststroke and men's 100 metre breaststroke events for Brunei at the 2019 World Aquatics Championships in Gwangju, South Korea. Isa made his Olympic debut for Brunei at the Tokyo 2020 Games by swimming the 100 metre breaststroke in 1:08.65.

Anderson Lim Chee Wei competed in the 200 metre freestyle preliminary round at the Aquatics Centre of Olympic Park at the London 2012 Olympic Games in England. In his event, the Brunei's first Olympian swimmer easily broke the previous national record with a time of 2:02.26. On 16 July 2022, Zeke Chan, beat Anderson Lim's ten-year-old national record in the 200 metre freestyle event with a timing of 2:00.46.

Christian Nikles participated in the 50 and 100 metre freestyle events at the 2011 World Aquatics Championships, but he was unable to make it past the quarter-finals. In the 2019 World Aquatics Championships, he competed in the men's 50 and 100 metre freestyle events representing Brunei. He failed to qualify for the semi-finals in either of the events.

National swimmer Joel Ling Thai Yu won silver in the men's 200 metre backstroke event at the 2022 Sukma Games with a timing of 2:12.91, beating his previous record of 2:14:68 established in the preliminary round. Joel also beat his personal record of 1:00.91 set at the 29th Brunei Age Group Championship 2022 by clocking a new national record in the men's 100 metre backstroke event.

Hayley Wong broke both the age group and national records for girls between the ages of 14 and 15 in the 19th FINA World Championships in Budapest, Hungary in 2022. Hayley set a new national record in the 200 metre butterfly event with a timing of 2:35.48, breaking Maria Grace Koh's previous mark. She broke a record that had existed since 21 June 2008, when her predecessor finished in a time of 2:39.86.

=== Endurance sports ===
At the 2016 Summer Olympics in Rio de Janeiro, Maizurah Abdul Rahim participated in the women's 200 metre event. At the end of the Games, she carried the Brunei flag during the closing ceremony.

The first female participant from Brunei ever to compete in an Olympic Games occurred at London 2012 when Maziah Mahusin broke the national athletics record in the women's 400 metres. Seven years later, she won silver and gold for 100 and 200 metre hurdles during the 2019 Sarawak Open Track and Field Championship.

Brunei sprinter Muhd Noor Firdaus Ar-Rasyid ran a time of 21.99 seconds in the 200 metres at the 2017 and 2019 World Athletics Championships. With a time of 21.39 seconds, he presently holds the record for the men's 200 metre competition at the Southeast Asian Games.

=== Combat sports ===
Silat Melayu is widely practised in Brunei, like its neighbouring countries in the Malay Archipelago. The local martial art in Brunei is called 'Silat Suffian Bela Diri'.

At the 19th World Pencak Silat Championships in Melaka, Malaysia, two bronze medals were won by Brunei. The men's and women's regu events in the competition from July 26 to 31 yielded both medals. In the men's division, the Philippines were defeated in the quarter-finals by the team of Ali Saifullah Abdullah, Hazim Ramliee, and Haziq Aqwa. They lost to Indonesia in the semi-finals, earning a joint bronze medal. The team of Anisah Najihah, Nur Wasiqah Aziemah, and Norleyermah Raya, on the other hand, defeated Thailand in the round of eight, but lost to Singapore in the semi-finals.

During the 18th Sukma Games at the Stadium Perpaduan in Petra Jaya, Kuching, siblings Hyde Nachman Hijium and Hyde Nathania Hijium represented Brunei by winning the bronze medals in the poomsae male individual and poomsae female individual events, respectively. Hyde Nachman of Brunei Darussalam defeated Mic Daniel Siaw of Sabah is competing for the male individual gold medal, and Hyde Nathania defeated Maitheli A/P Mohana Sundaram of Pulau Pinang to continue competing for the female individual gold medal.

== Team sports ==
=== Football ===
Main article: Football in Brunei

The most popular team sport in Brunei is association football. The Brunei national football team joined FIFA in 1969, but has not achieved much success. Brunei's highest-level domestic football league is the Brunei Super League, which is managed by the Football Association of Brunei Darussalam (FABD). Its first football league was the Brunei Premier League, which existed from 2002 until 2019.

=== Sepaktakraw ===
At the 2017 Southeast Asian Games (29th SEA Games), which were held at the Titiwangsa Stadium on 28 August 2017, the national sepak takraw team of Brunei took the bronze medal in the Men's Regu event. Despite finishing the round robin stage in fourth place and suffering straight-set losses to Malaysia, Laos, and Philippines, the national team shared the bronze medal with Laos. The team's bronze medal marked the nation's 14th overall finish in the SEA Games that year.

=== Rugby union ===
Main article: Rugby union in Brunei

The Brunei national rugby union team is in the 6th division.

=== Polo ===
The Brunei national polo team achieved bronze in the 2017 Southeast Asian Games (29th SEA Games).

=== Basketball ===
Brunei had a short-lived basketball tournament, the Brunei Cup, as well as a short-lived professional basketball team named Brunei Barracudas, which featured in the ASEAN Basketball League from 2009 to 2012.

=== Netball ===
Main article: Netball in Brunei

The Brunei national netball team represents Brunei in international events, and is known by the nickname Royal Bees. The INF World Rankings list Brunei at number 34 as of 2 December 2022. The Brunei national team won the bronze medal at the 2015 Southeast Asian Games as one of the two semi-finalists. For placing as one of the semi-finalists at the 2017 Southeast Asian Games, Brunei repeated this accomplishment. Brunei was led by Sri Lankan coach Thilaka Jinadasa during the 2017 Games. The 2019 Southeast Asian Games were held in Laguna, Philippines, and the Brunei ladies again managed to win bronze.

== Major sport events ==
Main articles: Brunei at the Olympics, Brunei at the Paralympics, and Brunei at the Commonwealth Games

=== Brunei Darussalam National Games ===
Brunei Darussalam holds its biennial national multi-sport event; the Brunei Darussalam National Games (Malay: Sukan Kebangsaan Brunei Darussalam, Jawi: سوكن كبڠسأن بروني دارالسلام, abbreviated as SKBD) since 2012, involving young athletes representing the nation's four districts, government agencies, and private organisations.

=== International multi-sport events ===
Brunei Darussalam participates in the neighbouring Sukma Games in Malaysia since 2000 as an invitational team; and regional international sporting events such as the BIMP-EAGA Friendship Games, the Asian Games, and the Southeast Asian Games. Global international multi-sport events partaken by Brunei include the Olympic Games and the Commonwealth Games. Brunei hosted the 1999 Southeast Asian Games and the 2008 and 2018 BIMP-EAGA Friendship Games.

=== Hassanal Bolkiah Trophy ===
Main article: Hassanal Bolkiah Trophy

Southeast Asia's youth football competition is known as the Hassanal Bolkiah Trophy for ASEAN Youth Football Championship. Football players from ASEAN members under the age of 21 were allowed to take part in this. The ASEAN Football Federation and the National Football Association of Brunei Darussalam jointly organise the competition. The competition made its debut in 2002, and is always hosted by Brunei Darussalam.

== See also ==
- Royal Brunei Armed Forces Sports Council
- Ministry of Culture, Youth and Sports (Brunei)

== See also ==
- Malay culture
- People of Brunei
- Prostitution in Brunei
- Public holidays in Brunei
