= Brunei at the 2022 World Aquatics Championships =

- Flag of Brunei
- World Aquatics code: BRU
- National federation: Brunei Amateur Swimming Federation

in Budapest, Hungary
- Competitors: 3 in 1 sport
- Medals: Gold 0 Silver 0 Bronze 0 Total 0

World Aquatics Championships appearances
- 1973; 1975; 1978; 1982; 1986; 1991; 1994; 1998; 2001; 2003; 2005; 2007; 2009; 2011; 2013; 2015; 2017; 2019; 2022; 2023; 2024; 2025

Brunei competed at the 2022 World Aquatics Championships in Budapest, Hungary from 17 June to 3 July.

== Swimming ==
Brunei entered three swimmers.

Men

Athlete	Event	Heat		Semifinal		Final	
Athlete	Event	Time	Rank	Time	Rank	Time	Rank
Christian Nikles	50 m freestyle	24.44	65	did not advance			
Christian Nikles	100 m freestyle	54.71	81	did not advance			
Haziq Samil	200 m freestyle	2:04.14	58	did not advance			
Haziq Samil	400 m freestyle	4:23.59	41	—		did not advance	

Women

Athlete	Event	Heat		Semifinal		Final	
Athlete	Event	Time	Rank	Time	Rank	Time	Rank
Hayley Wong	200 m butterfly	2:35.48	25	did not advance			
Hayley Wong	200 m medley	2:37.55	37	did not advance			
