= Brunei at the 2024 World Aquatics Championships =

- Flag of Brunei
- FINA code: BRU
- National federation: Brunei Amateur Swimming Association

in Doha, Qatar
- Competitors: 3 in 1 sport
- Medals: Gold 0 Silver 0 Bronze 0 Total 0

World Aquatics Championships appearances
- 1973; 1975; 1978; 1982; 1986; 1991; 1994; 1998; 2001; 2003; 2005; 2007; 2009; 2011; 2013; 2015; 2017; 2019; 2022; 2023; 2024

Brunei competed at the 2024 World Aquatics Championships in Doha, Qatar from 2 to 18 February.

== Competitors ==
The following is the list of competitors in the Championships.

Sport	Men	Women	Total
Swimming	2	1	3
Total	2	1	3

== Swimming ==
Brunei entered 3 swimmers.

Men

Athlete	Event	Heat		Semifinal		Final	
Athlete	Event	Time	Rank	Time	Rank	Time	Rank
Zeke Chan	100 metre backstroke	1:00.49	50	Did not advance			
Zeke Chan	200 metre backstroke	2:12.94	33	Did not advance			
Haziq Samil	50 metre freestyle	25.72	85	Did not advance			
Haziq Samil	100 metre freestyle	55.36	88	Did not advance			

Women

Athlete	Event	Heat		Semifinal		Final	
Athlete	Event	Time	Rank	Time	Rank	Time	Rank
Hayley Wong	100 metre freestyle	1:03.49	65	Did not advance			
Hayley Wong	100 metre breaststroke	1:20.28	49	Did not advance			
