= Brunei at the 2023 World Aquatics Championships =

- Flag of Brunei
- FINA code: BRU
- National federation: Brunei Amateur Swimming Association
- Website: bruneiswimming.com

in Fukuoka, Japan
- Competitors: 3 in 1 sport
- Medals: Gold 0 Silver 0 Bronze 0 Total 0

World Aquatics Championships appearances
- 1973; 1975; 1978; 1982; 1986; 1991; 1994; 1998; 2001; 2003; 2005; 2007; 2009; 2011; 2013; 2015; 2017; 2019; 2022; 2023; 2024

Brunei is set to compete at the 2023 World Aquatics Championships in Fukuoka, Japan from 14 to 30 July.

== Swimming ==
Brunei entered 3 swimmers.

Men

Athlete	Event	Heat		Semifinal		Final	
Athlete	Event	Time	Rank	Time	Rank	Time	Rank
Zeke Chan	100 metre freestyle	55.37	98	Did not advance			
Zeke Chan	100 metre backstroke	59.61	56	Did not advance			
Joel Ling	50 metre freestyle	24.96	87	Did not advance			
Joel Ling	200 metre backstroke	2:13.07	38	Did not advance			

Women

Athlete	Event	Heat		Semifinal		Final	
Athlete	Event	Time	Rank	Time	Rank	Time	Rank
Hayley Wong	100 metre freestyle	1:03.48	63	Did not advance			
Hayley Wong	100 metre butterfly	1:09.52	47	Did not advance			
