= India at the 2023 Commonwealth Youth Games =

- CGF code: IND
- CGA: Indian Olympic Association

in Trinidad and Tobago
- Competitors: 24
- Flag bearer: Vedaant Madhavan
- Medals Ranked 17th: Gold 0 Silver 2 Bronze 3 Total 5

Commonwealth Youth Games appearances
- 2000; 2004; 2008; 2011; 2015; 2017; 2023

India competed at the 2023 Commonwealth Youth Games, officially known as the VII Commonwealth Youth Games and informally as Trinbago 2023. It was held in Trinidad and Tobago from 4 to 11 August 2023. India has participated in all the editions of the Commonwealth Youth Games. The nation was represented by the Indian Olympic Association, which is responsible for the Commonwealth Games and Commonwealth Youth Games in India.

== Competitors ==
Sport	Boys	Girls	Total
Athletics	4	4	8
Cycling	3	3	6
Swimming	3	3	6
Triathlon	2	2	4
Total	12	12	24

== Medalists ==
Medal	Name	Sport	Event	Date
Silver	Shoan Ganguly	Swimming	Men's 400m Individual Medley	7 August
Silver	Asha Kiran Barla	Athletics	Women's 800 m	
Bronze	Sasi Anupriya	Athletics	Women's shot put	7 August
Bronze	Pooja	Athletics	Women's high jump	
Bronze	Arjun	Athletics	Men's javelin throw	

== Athletics ==
Boys

Athletes	Event	Final	
Athletes	Event	Result	Rank
Abhay Singh	200 m	-	DNF
Navpreet Singh	400 m	48:20	4
Bapi Hansda	400 m hurdles	1:05:29	8
Arjun	Javelin throw	65.94	3

Girls

Athletes	Event	Final	
Athletes	Event	Result	Rank
Asha Kiran Barla	800 m	2:04:99	2
Anupriya Sasi	Shot put	15.62m	Bronze medal
Pooja	High jump	1.75	3

Mixed

Athletes	Event	Final	
Athletes	Event	Result	Rank
Abhay Singh; Navpreet Singh; Asha Kiran Barla; Shireen Ahluwalia	4×400 m relay	3:31:79	6

== Cycling ==
Road race

Athletes	Event	Final	
Athletes	Event	Result	Rank
Aksar Tyagi	Boy's road race	1:33:59	20
Aashirvad Saxena	Boy's road race	1:41:25	29
Gargi Bishnoi	Girl's road race	1:47:41	16
Priyamvadha Jayakumar	Girl's road race	1:34:16	10

Track

Athletes	Event	Final	
Athletes	Event	Result	Rank
Aksar Tyagi	Boy's 3000 individual pursuit	3:26:978	7
Aashirvad Saxena	Boy's 3000 individual pursuit	3:35:823	8
Gargi Bishnoi	Girl's 3000 individual pursuit	20:39	7
Priyamvadha Jayakumar	Girl's 3000 individual pursuit	20:49	6
Aksar Tyagi	Boy's point race	5	9
Aashirvad Saxena	Boy's point race	-	-
Gargi Bishnoi	Girl's point race	7	4
Priyamvadha Jayakumar	Girl's point race	-20	10
Aksar Tyagi	Boy's scratch race		10
Aashirvad Saxena	Boy's scratch race		11
Gargi Bishnoi	Girl's scratch race		9
Priyamvadha Jayakumar	Girl's scratch race		5
Vendat Jadhav	Boy's sprint		5
Vendat Jadhav	Boy's time trial	1:11:304	10
Vendat Jadhav	Boy's keirin	12:633	5
Srimathi Jesudasan	Girl's sprint	12.943	6
Srimathi Jesudasan	Girl's time trial	39:242	7
Srimathi Jesudasan	Girl's keirin	-	DNS
