= Brunei at the 2013 World Aquatics Championships =

- Flag of Brunei
- FINA code: BRU
- National federation: Brunei Swimming Federation
- Website: www.bruneiswimming.com

in Barcelona, Spain
- Competitors: 4 in 1 sports
- Medals: Gold 0 Silver 0 Bronze 0 Total 0

World Aquatics Championships appearances
- 1973; 1975; 1978; 1982; 1986; 1991; 1994; 1998; 2001; 2003; 2005; 2007; 2009; 2011; 2013; 2015; 2017; 2019; 2022; 2023; 2024

Brunei competed at the 2013 World Aquatics Championships in Barcelona, Spain between 19 July and 4 August 2013.

== Swimming ==
Swimmers from Brunei achieved qualifying standards in the following events (up to a maximum of 2 swimmers in each event at the A-standard entry time, and 1 at the B-standard):

Men

Athlete	Event	Heat		Semifinal		Final	
Athlete	Event	Time	Rank	Time	Rank	Time	Rank
Muhammad Isa Ahmad	50 m breaststroke	31.68	66	did not advance			
Muhammad Isa Ahmad	100 m breaststroke	1:09.96	68	did not advance			
Christian Nikles	50 m freestyle	25.52	71	did not advance			
Christian Nikles	100 m freestyle	55.55	72	did not advance			

Women

Athlete	Event	Heat		Semifinal		Final	
Athlete	Event	Time	Rank	Time	Rank	Time	Rank
Nur Hamizah Ahmad	50 m backstroke	33.85	48	did not advance			
Nur Hamizah Ahmad	100 m backstroke	1:13.25	48	did not advance			
Tiara Shahril	50 m freestyle	28.74	61	did not advance			
Tiara Shahril	100 m freestyle	1:02.88	62	did not advance			
