= Malaysia at the 2023 Commonwealth Youth Games =

- Flag of Malaysia
- CGF code: MAS
- CGA: Olympic Council of Malaysia
- Website: olympic.org.my

in Trinidad and Tobago 4 August 2023 – 11 August 2023
- Competitors: 14 in 3 sports
- Flag bearers: Muhammad Hafiq Mohd Jafri; Tan Rou Xin
- Medals Ranked 14th: Gold 1 Silver 2 Bronze 2 Total 5

Commonwealth Youth Games appearances
- 2000; 2004; 2008; 2011; 2015; 2017; 2023

Malaysia competed at the 2023 Commonwealth Youth Games in Trinidad and Tobago, from 4 to 11 August 2023. It is Malaysia's 7th appearance at the Commonwealth Youth Games. Malaysia is represented by the Olympic Council of Malaysia, which is responsible for Malaysian participation in the multi-sport events, including Commonwealth Games and Commonwealth Youth Games. Malaysian delegation consisted of 14 athletes competed in three different sports— athletics, cycling, and swimming.

== Competitors ==
| Sport | Boy | Girl | Total |
|---|---|---|---|
| Athletics | 4 | 0 | 4 |
| Cycling | 3 | 4 | 7 |
| Swimming | 2 | 1 | 3 |
| Total | 9 | 5 | 14 |

== Medal summary ==
=== Medal by sports ===
Medals by sport
| Sport | 1st place, gold medalist(s) | 2nd place, silver medalist(s) | 3rd place, bronze medalist(s) | Total |
|---|---|---|---|---|
| Cycling | 0 | 2 | 2 | 4 |
| Swimming | 1 | 0 | 0 | 1 |
| Total | 1 | 2 | 2 | 5 |

=== Medal by date ===
Medals by date
| Day | Date | 1st place, gold medalist(s) | 2nd place, silver medalist(s) | 3rd place, bronze medalist(s) | Total |
|---|---|---|---|---|---|
| 1 | 4 August | Opening Ceremony | | | |
| 2 | 5 August | 0 | 0 | 0 | 0 |
| 3 | 6 August | 0 | 0 | 0 | 0 |
| 4 | 7 August | 0 | 0 | 1 | 1 |
| 5 | 8 August | 0 | 0 | 0 | 0 |
| 6 | 9 August | 1 | 1 | 0 | 2 |
| 7 | 10 August | 0 | 1 | 1 | 2 |
| 8 | 11 August | Closing Ceremony | | | |
| Total | | 1 | 2 | 2 | 5 |

=== Medalists ===
| Medal | Name | Sport | Event | Date |
|---|---|---|---|---|
| Gold | Goh Li Hen | Swimming | Boy’s 200 m butterfly | August 9 |
| Silver | Darwish Putra Sanusi | Cycling-Track | Boy’s Keirin | August 10 |
| Silver | Nur Alyssa Mohd Farid | Cycling- Track | Girl’s Sprint | August 9 |
| Bronze | New Joe Lau | Cycling - Road | Boy's road race | August 7 |
| Bronze | Muhammad Hafiq Mohd Jafri | Cycling-Track | Boy’s 1000m Time Trial | August 10 |

== Athletics ==
Track & road events

| Athlete | Event | Final | |
| Athlete | Event | Time | Rank |
|---|---|---|---|
| Muhammad Fiross Mohd Faizal | Boy's 110 m hurdles | 13.69 | 5 |
| Muhammad Hazriq Mat Kilau | Boy's 110 m hurdles | 13.67 | 4 |

Field events

| Athlete | Event | Final | |
| Athlete | Event | Distance | Position |
|---|---|---|---|
| Mohamad Nawawi Mohamad | Boy's High jump | 1.95 | 5 |
| Adam Haqimi Azrail | Boy's Long jump | 7.05 | 7 |

== Cycling ==
=== Road ===
Boy

| Athlete | Event | Time | Rank |
|---|---|---|---|
| Muhammad Hafiq Mohd Jafri | Road race | 1:33:55 | 11 |
| New Joe Lau | Road race | 1:33:25 | 3rd place, bronze medalist(s) |
| Muhammad Hafiq Mohd Jafri | Time trial | 21:43.30 | 24 |
| New Joe Lau | Time trial | 20:48.42 | 12 |

Girl

| Athlete | Event | Time | Rank |
|---|---|---|---|
| Ameera Alya Md Zahirrudin | Road race | 1:34:16 | 8 |
| Dahlia Hazwani Hasyim | Road race | 1:32:55 | 6 |
| Dahlia Hazwani Hasyim | Time trial | 16:13.11 | 10 |

=== Track ===
Sprint

| Athlete | Event | Qualification | | Quarterfinals | Semifinals | Final | |
| Athlete | Event | Time | Rank | Opposition Time | Opposition Time | Opposition Time | Rank |
|---|---|---|---|---|---|---|---|
| Darwish Putra Mohd Sanusi | Boy's sprint | 11.054 | 5 Q | William Salter (WAL); L, W 11.352, W 11.379 | Tayte Ryan (AUS); L, L | Danell James (TTO); L, L | 4 |
| Nur Alyssa Mohd Farid | Girl's sprint | 11.733 | 2 Q | Srimathi Jesudasanr (IND); W 12.204, W 12.522 | Yong Ann Tung (MAS); W 12.373, W 12.232 | Sarah Johnson (SCO); L, L | 2nd place, silver medalist(s) |
| Yong Ann Tung | Girl's sprint | 11.772 | 3 Q | Alexia Wilson (TTO); W 12.207, W 12.396 | Nur Alyssa Mohd Farid (MAS); L, L | Liliya Tatarinoff (AUS); L, L | 4 |

Keirin

| Athlete | Event | 1st Round | Final |
| Athlete | Event | Rank | Rank |
|---|---|---|---|
| Darwish Putra Mohd Sanusi | Boy's keirin | —N/a | 2nd place, silver medalist(s) |
| Nur Alyssa Mohd Farid | Girl's keirin | 1 Q | 4 |
| Yong Ann Tung | Girl's keirin | 3 Q | 5 |

Time trial

| Athlete | Event | Time | Rank |
|---|---|---|---|
| Muhammad Hafiq Mohd Jafri | Boy's 1000m time trial | 1:04.944 | 3rd place, bronze medalist(s) |
| Nur Alyssa Mohd Farid | Girl's 500m time trial | 37.440 | 5 |
| Yong Ann Tung | Girl's 500m time trial | 37.300 | 4 |

Scratch

| Athlete | Event | Rank |
|---|---|---|
| Muhammad Hafiq Mohd Jafri | Boy's 10km scratch race | 5 |
| New Joe Lau | Boy's 10km scratch race | 7 |
| Dahlia Hazwani Hasyim | Girl's 7.5km scratch race | 7 |
| Ameera Alya Md Zahirrudin | Girl's 7.5km scratch race | 8 |

== Swimming ==
| Athlete | Event | Heats | | Final | |
| Athlete | Event | Time | Rank | Time | Rank |
|---|---|---|---|---|---|
| Goh Li Hen | Boy's 200 m butterfly | 2:05.75 | 2 Q | 2:03.63 | 1st place, gold medalist(s) |
| Goh Li Hen | Boy's 200 m freestyle | 1:58.81 | 24 | Did not advance | |
| Goh Li Hen | Boy's 400 m freestyle | 4:11.10 | 16 | Did not advance | |
| Goh Li Hen | Boy's 400 m individual medley | 4:42.07 | 14 | Did not advance | |
| Muhammad Dhuha Zulfikry | Boy's 100 m freestyle | 53.31 | 23 | Did not advance | |
| Muhammad Dhuha Zulfikry | Boy's 200 m freestyle | 1:55.14 | 15 | Did not advance | |
| Muhammad Dhuha Zulfikry | Boy's 400 m freestyle | 4:02.93 | 10 | Did not advance | |
| Muhammad Dhuha Zulfikry | Boy's 1500 m freestyle | —N/a | | 16:03.15 | 7 |
| Tan Rou Xin | Girl's 50 m breaststroke | 32.83 | 3 Q | 32.75 | 5 |
| Tan Rou Xin | Girl's 100 m breaststroke | 1:13.75 | 9 | Did not advance | |
| Tan Rou Xin | Girl's 200 m breaststroke | 2:37.85 | 9 | Did not advance | |
| Tan Rou Xin | Girl's 200 m individual medley | 2:22.48 | 4 Q | 2:21.91 | 6 |
