= BRFU =

BRFU may refer to:

- Brunei Rugby Football Union
- Buller Rugby Football Union
