= Beach volleyball at the 2023 Commonwealth Youth Games =

- Venue: Black Rock beach, Tobago
- Dates: August 5, 2023–August 10, 2023
- Nations: 12

Beach volleyball at the 2023 Commonwealth Youth Games took place from 5–10 August 2023 at the Black Rock beach in Tobago, Trinidad and Tobago.

== Medalists ==
| Event | Gold | Silver | Bronze |
|---|---|---|---|
| Boys | Canada; Oliver Toomes; Andon Kiriakou | England; Peter Soczewka; Rob Morgan | New Zealand; Calum Stewart; Juraj Karjci |
| Girls | Canada; Calinda Kok; Katarina Drozd | Australia; Jasmine Rayner; Cameron Zajer | New Zealand; Kiana Stevenson; Tineke Hinton |

== Medal table ==
* Host nation (Trinidad and Tobago)

| Rank | Nation | Gold | Silver | Bronze | Total |
|---|---|---|---|---|---|
| 1 | Canada | 2 | 0 | 0 | 2 |
| 2 | Australia | 0 | 1 | 0 | 1 |
| 2 | England | 0 | 1 | 0 | 1 |
| 4 | New Zealand | 0 | 0 | 2 | 2 |
| Totals (4 entries) | | 2 | 2 | 2 | 6 |

== Results ==
=== Group stage ===
Boys
Group A

| Pos | Team | Pld | W | L | Pts | SW | SL | SR | SPW | SPL | SPR |
|---|---|---|---|---|---|---|---|---|---|---|---|
| 1 | Alexeis Savvadis – Anninos Alexios (CYP) | 2 | 2 | 0 | 4 | 0 | 0 | — | 0 | 0 | — |
| 2 | Jagreef Miguel – Jerome Morrison (TTO) | 2 | 1 | 1 | 3 | 0 | 0 | — | 0 | 0 | — |
| 3 | Majula Nisal Hawarige – Sameen Madhusan Fernando (SRI) | 2 | 0 | 2 | 2 | 0 | 0 | — | 0 | 0 | — |

Group B

| Pos | Team | Pld | W | L | Pts | SW | SL | SR | SPW | SPL | SPR |
|---|---|---|---|---|---|---|---|---|---|---|---|
| 1 | Jett Grehan – Mitchell Croft (AUS) | 2 | 2 | 0 | 4 | 0 | 0 | — | 0 | 0 | — |
| 2 | Jayden Cristiano – Delosgen Valaitham (RSA) | 2 | 1 | 1 | 3 | 0 | 0 | — | 0 | 0 | — |
| 3 | Julian AjonSashi – Vikash Prakash (SKN) | 2 | 0 | 2 | 2 | 0 | 0 | — | 0 | 0 | — |

Group C

| Pos | Team | Pld | W | L | Pts | SW | SL | SR | SPW | SPL | SPR |
|---|---|---|---|---|---|---|---|---|---|---|---|
| 1 | Calum Stewart – Juraj Karjci (NZL) | 2 | 2 | 0 | 4 | 0 | 0 | — | 0 | 0 | — |
| 2 | Rio Viktor Hawarige – Tafari Charles (LCA) | 2 | 1 | 1 | 3 | 0 | 0 | — | 0 | 0 | — |
| 3 | Bubakar Semega – Sanusi Jawara (GAM) | 2 | 0 | 2 | 2 | 0 | 0 | — | 0 | 0 | — |

Group D

| Pos | Team | Pld | W | L | Pts | SW | SL | SR | SPW | SPL | SPR |
|---|---|---|---|---|---|---|---|---|---|---|---|
| 1 | Oliver Toomes – Andon Kiriakou (CAN) | 2 | 2 | 0 | 4 | 0 | 0 | — | 0 | 0 | — |
| 2 | Peter Soczewka – Rob Morgan (ENG) | 2 | 1 | 1 | 3 | 0 | 0 | — | 0 | 0 | — |
| 3 | Tristan Kayiraga– Francois D'assise (RWA) | 2 | 0 | 2 | 2 | 0 | 0 | — | 0 | 0 | — |
