= List of Bruneian records in swimming =

The Bruneian records in swimming are the fastest ever performances of swimmers from Brunei, which are recognised and ratified by the Brunei Amateur Swimming Association (BASA).

All records were set in finals unless noted otherwise.

== Long Course (50 m) ==
=== Men ===
Event	Time		Name	Club	Date	Meet	Location	Ref
50 m freestyle	24.23	h	Christian Nikles	Brunei	7 May 2023	Southeast Asian Games	Phnom Penh, Cambodia	
100 m freestyle	52.72	r	Joel Ling	Brunei	14 December 2025	Southeast Asian Games	Bangkok, Thailand	
200 m freestyle	1:59.95		Zeke Chan	Brunei	25 August 2023	SEA Age Group Championships	Jakarta, Indonesia	
400 m freestyle	4:20.14		Nur Haziq Samil	-	23 October 2020	Thailand Age Group Championships	Samutprakan, Thailand	
800 m freestyle	9:04.88		Nur Haziq Samil	-	25 October 2020	Thailand Age Group Championships	Samutprakan, Thailand	
1500 m freestyle	17:13.37		Nur Haziq Samil	-	30 November 2021	Thailand Age Group Championships	Samutprakan, Thailand	
50m backstroke	27.25		Joel Ling	-	25 September 2025	Borneo Games	Kuching, Malaysia	
50m backstroke	27.07	#	Joel Ling	Brunei	19 August 2026	Sukma Games	Shah Alam, Malaysia	
100m backstroke	58.94		Joel Ling	-	16 January 2026	MILO/AKL Age Group Championships	Kuala Lumpur, Malaysia	
100m backstroke	57.85	#	Joel Ling	Brunei	23 August 2026	Sukma Games	Shah Alam, Malaysia	
200m backstroke	2:11.41	h	Joel Ling Thai Yu	Brunei	15 December 2025	Southeast Asian Games	Bangkok, Thailand	
200m backstroke	2:11.00	h, #	Joel Ling	Brunei	26 July 2026	Commonwealth Games	Glasgow, United Kingdom	
200m backstroke	2:09.49	#	Joel Ling	Brunei	20 August 2026	Sukma Games	Shah Alam, Malaysia	
50m breaststroke	29.87		Muhammad Isa Ahmad	Brunei	8 December 2019	Southeast Asian Games	Capas, Philippines	
100m breaststroke	1:06.40		Muhammad Isa Ahmad	-	21 April 2019	Brunei Age Group Championships	Bandar Seri Begawan, Brunei	
200m breaststroke	2:28.12		Muhammad Isa Ahmad	-	13 September 2019	Brunei Open & Masters Championships	Bandar Seri Begawan, Brunei	
50m butterfly	25.96	h	Christian Nikles	University of Strling	8 April 2017	Irish Championships	Dublin, Ireland	
100m butterfly	58.81	h	Christian Nikles	Brunei	26 August 2015	World Junior Championships	Singapore, Singapore	
200m butterfly	2:15.58		Zeke Chan	-	12 June 2022	Brunei Age Group Championships	Bandar Seri Begawan, Brunei	
200m individual medley	2:11.01		Zeke Chan	-	27 April 2025	Brunei Age Group Championships	Bandar Seri Begawan, Brunei	
400m individual medley	4:59.37		Joel Ling	-	2 April 2021	Brunei Age Group Championships	Bandar Seri Begawan, Brunei	
4×100m freestyle relay	3:38.20		Christian Nikles (54.51); Zeke Chan (53.92); Muhammad Ahmad (55.52); Nur Samil (54.25)	Brunei	10 May 2023	Southeast Asian Games	Phnom Penh, Cambodia	
4×200m freestyle relay	8:37.15		Nur Haziq Samil; Dylan Wong; Danniel Chan; Joel Ling	-	28 September 2025	Borneo Games	Kuching, Malaysia	
4×100m medley relay	4:15.25		Joel Ling; Muhammad Isa Ahmad; Christian Nikles; Ak Md Abd Saifullah Pg Hj Asmalina	-	3 April 2021	Brunei Age Group Championships	Bandar Seri Begawan, Brunei	

Legend: # – Record awaiting ratification by BASA; WR – World record; AS – Asian record; e – equalled existing record;
Records not set in finals: h – heat; sf – semifinal; r – relay 1st leg; rh – relay heat 1st leg; b – B final; † – en route to final mark; so – swim-off; tt – time trial

=== Women ===
Event	Time		Name	Club	Date	Meet	Location	Ref
50m freestyle	27.19		Hayley Wong	-	17 May 2026	Brunei Age Group Championships	Bandar Seri Begawan, Brunei	
100m freestyle	59.53		Hayley Wong	-	27 June 2026	Brunei Open & Masters Championships	Bandar Seri Begawan, Brunei	
200m freestyle	2:12.56		Tiara Anwar	-	15 November 2014	Brunei Open	Bandar Seri Begawan, Brunei	
400m freestyle	4:39.54		Tiara Anwar	-	15 November 2014	Brunei Open	Bandar Seri Begawan, Brunei	
800m freestyle	9:45.45		Tiara Anwar	-	16 November 2014	Brunei Open	Bandar Seri Begawan, Brunei	
1500m freestyle	19:05.55		Tiara Anwar	-	18 April 2014	Brunei Age Group Championships	Bandar Seri Begawan, Brunei	
50m backstroke	30.48		Sharmeen Binti Mohd Mharvin	-	15 May 2026	Brunei Age Group Championships	Bandar Seri Begawan, Brunei	
50m backstroke	30.29	h, #	Sharmeen Binti Mohd Mharvin	Brunei	19 August 2026	Sukma Games	Shah Alam, Malaysia	
100m backstroke	1:07.78		Sharmeen Binti Mohd Mharvin	-	25 November 2025	ASEAN Schools Games	Bandar Seri Begawan, Brunei	
100m backstroke	1:07.65	h, #	Sharmeen Binti Mohd Mharvin	Brunei	23 August 2026	Sukma Games	Shah Alam, Malaysia	
200m backstroke	2:33.97		Sharmeen Binti Mohd Mharvin	-	25 September 2025	Borneo Games	Kuching, Malaysia	
50m breaststroke	34.91		Hayley Wong	Brunei	27 February 2024	Asian Age Group Championships	New Clark City, Philippines	
100m breaststroke	1:19.74		Emma Yusuf	Hammerheads	15 February 2020	Brunei Sprints Championships	Bandar Seri Begawan, Brunei	
200m breaststroke	2:50.35		Hayley Wong	-	30 June 2024	Brunei Age Group Championships	Bandar Seri Begawan, Brunei	
50m butterfly	29.31		Hayley Wong	Brunei	6 August 2023	Commonwealth Youth Games	Couva, Trinidad and Tobago	
50m butterfly	28.99	h, #	Hayley Wong	Brunei	24 July 2026	Commonwealth Games	Glasgow, United Kingdom	
100m butterfly	1:05.89		Hayley Wong	-	17 May 2026	Brunei Age Group Championships	Bandar Seri Begawan, Brunei	
200m butterfly	2:35.48		Hayley Wong	Brunei	21 June 2022	World Championships	Budapest, Hungary	
200m individual medley	2:33.80		Hayley Wong	-	4 April 2021	Brunei Age Group Championships	Bandar Seri Begawan, Brunei	
400m individual medley	5:29.06		Hayley Wong	-	25 August 2023	SEA Age Group Championships	Jakarta, Indonesia	
4×100m freestyle relay	4:21.64		Ashley Chai; Emma Yusuf; Andra Chai; Hayley Wong	-	4 April 2021	Brunei Age Group Championships	Bandar Seri Begawan, Brunei	
4×200m freestyle relay								
4×100m medley relay	4:52.85		Ashley Chai; Emma Yusuf; Andra Chai; Hayley Wong	-	2 April 2021	Brunei Age Group Championships	Bandar Seri Begawan, Brunei	

Legend: # – Record awaiting ratification by BASA; WR – World record; AS – Asian record; e – equalled existing record;
Records not set in finals: h – heat; sf – semifinal; r – relay 1st leg; rh – relay heat 1st leg; b – B final; † – en route to final mark; so – swim-off; tt – time trial

== Short Course (25 m) ==
=== Men ===
Event	Time		Name	Club	Date	Meet	Location	Ref
50m freestyle	23.53		Christian Nikles	-	3 December 2022	Brunei Age Group Championships	Bandar Seri Begawan, Brunei	
100m freestyle	51.56		Zeke Chan	-	27 January 2024	Brunei National Age Group Sprints	Bandar Seri Begawan, Brunei	
200m freestyle	1:55.50		Zeke Chan	-	4 December 2022	Brunei Age Group Championships	Bandar Seri Begawan, Brunei	
400m freestyle	4:08.06		Zeke Chan	-	17 November 2022	Brunei Open & Masters Championships	Bandar Seri Begawan, Brunei	
800m freestyle	8:59.42		Nur Haziq Samil	-	23 October 2021	TSA-AIMG Time Trial	Samutprakan, Thailand	
1500m freestyle	16:44.20		Nur Haziq Samil	-	23 October 2021	TSA-AIMG Time Trial	Samutprakan, Thailand	
50m backstroke	26.86		Joel Ling	-	13 June 2025	Brunei Open & Masters Championships	Bandar Seri Begawan, Brunei	
100m backstroke	57.23		Zeke Chan	-	18 November 2023	Brunei Open & Masters Championships	Bandar Seri Begawan, Brunei	
200m backstroke	2:05.03		Zeke Chan	-	17 November 2023	Brunei Open & Masters Championships	Bandar Seri Begawan, Brunei	
50m breaststroke	29.32	h	Muhammad Isa Ahmad	Brunei	20 December 2021	World Championships	Abu Dhabi, United Arab Emirates	
100m breaststroke	1:04.09	h	Muhammad Isa Ahmad	Brunei	16 December 2021	World Championships	Abu Dhabi, United Arab Emirates	
200m breaststroke	2:30.49	h	Muhammad Isa Ahmad	Brunei	10 November 2012	World Cup	Singapore, Singapore	
50m butterfly	25.50	h	Christian Nikles	University of Strling	10 December 2017	Scottish Championships	Edinburgh, Great Britain	
100m butterfly	57.03		Christian Nikles	Millfield College	8 November 2015	ASA South West Regionals	Millfield, Great Britain	
200m butterfly	2:12.76		Joel Ling	-	8 February 2025	Brunei Age Group Championships	Bandar Seri Begawan, Brunei	
100m individual medley	58.47	h	Joel Ling	Brunei	12 December 2024	World Championships	Budapest, Hungary	
200m individual medley	2:06.01	h	Zeke Chan	Mount Kelly	5 December 2024	Swim England National Winter Championships	Sheffield, United Kingdom	
400m individual medley	4:44.83		Joel Ling	-	8 February 2025	Brunei Age Group Championships	Bandar Seri Begawan, Brunei	
4×50m freestyle relay	1:42.60		Joel Ling; Ilyas Haziq Mohd Irwan Hasmann; Ak Md Abd Saifullah Pg Hj Asmalina; Nur Haziq Samil	-	1 October 2022	Brunei Age Group Championships	Bandar Seri Begawan, Brunei	
4×100m freestyle relay								
4×200m freestyle relay								
4×50m medley relay	1:53.96		Joel Ling; Ak Md Abd Saifullah Pg Hj Asmalina; Ilyas Haziq Mohd Irwan Hasmann; Nur Haziq Samil	-	2 October 2022	Brunei Age Group Championships	Bandar Seri Begawan, Brunei	
4×100m medley relay								

Legend: # – Record awaiting ratification by BASA; WR – World record; AS – Asian record; e – equalled existing record;
Records not set in finals: h – heat; sf – semifinal; r – relay 1st leg; rh – relay heat 1st leg; b – B final; † – en route to final mark; so – swim-off; tt – time trial

=== Women ===
Event	Time		Name	Club	Date	Meet	Location	Ref
50m freestyle	26.77		Sharmeen Md Mharvin	-	7 December 2025	Brunei Age Group Championships	Bandar Seri Begawan, Brunei	
100m freestyle	59.26		Sharmeen Md Mharvin	-	6 December 2025	Brunei Age Group Championships	Bandar Seri Begawan, Brunei	
200m freestyle	2:08.15	h	Tiara Anwar	Brunei	7 December 2014	World Championships	Doha, Qatar	
400m freestyle	4:44.80		Hayley Wong	-	28 April 2024	Brunei Age Group Championships	Bandar Seri Begawan, Brunei	
800m freestyle								
1500m freestyle								
50m backstroke	30.10		Sharmeen Md Mharvin	-	6 December 2025	Brunei Age Group Championships	Bandar Seri Begawan, Brunei	
100m backstroke	1:05.64		Sharmeen Md Mharvin	-	7 December 2025	Brunei Age Group Championships	Bandar Seri Begawan, Brunei	
200m backstroke	2:29.36		Sharmeen Md Mharvin	-	13 June 2025	Brunei Open & Masters Championships	Bandar Seri Begawan, Brunei	
50m breaststroke	33.32		Hayley Wong	-	28 April 2024	Brunei Age Group Championships	Bandar Seri Begawan, Brunei	
100m breaststroke	1:14.10		Hayley Wong	-	28 January 2024	Brunei Age Group Championships	Bandar Seri Begawan, Brunei	
200m breaststroke	2:44.66		Hayley Wong	-	28 April 2024	Brunei Age Group Championships	Bandar Seri Begawan, Brunei	
50m butterfly	28.78		Hayley Wong	-	18 November 2023	Brunei Open & Masters Championships	Bandar Seri Begawan, Brunei	
100m butterfly	1:04.99		Hayley Wong	-	8 February 2026	Brunei Age Group Championships	Bandar Seri Begawan, Brunei	
200m butterfly	2:34.14		Hayley Wong	-	3 December 2022	Brunei Age Group Championships	Bandar Seri Begawan, Brunei	
100m individual medley	1:07.03		Hayley Wong	-	19 November 2023	Brunei Open & Masters Championships	Bandar Seri Begawan, Brunei	
200m individual medley	2:28.66		Hayley Wong	-	28 April 2024	Brunei Age Group Championships	Bandar Seri Begawan, Brunei	
400m individual medley	5:20.86		Hayley Wong	-	3 December 2022	Brunei Age Group Championships	Bandar Seri Begawan, Brunei	
4×50m freestyle relay	2:08.62		Sharmeen Md Mharvin; Eva Adelleeya Haszriman; Dk Nura Huda Pg Shamsol Bahri; Abbey Wong	-	9 February 2025	Brunei Age Group Championships	Bandar Seri Begawan, Brunei	
4×100m freestyle relay								
4×200m freestyle relay								
4×50m medley relay	2:17.74		Ashley Chai; Andra Chai; Kyra Adrieanna Bahrom Shem; Sharmeen Md Mharvin	-	18 July 2021	Brunei Sprints & Masters Championships	Bandar Seri Begawan, Brunei	
4×100m medley relay								

Legend: # – Record awaiting ratification by BASA; WR – World record; AS – Asian record; e – equalled existing record;
Records not set in finals: h – heat; sf – semifinal; r – relay 1st leg; rh – relay heat 1st leg; b – B final; † – en route to final mark; so – swim-off; tt – time trial

=== Mixed relay ===
Event	Time		Name	Club	Date	Meet	Location	Ref
Mixed 4×50m freestyle relay	1:47.98		Christian Nazario Nikles (24.71); Nur Hamizah Ahmad (29.52); Amnahliyani Mohamad Husain (28.63); Muhammad Isa Ahmad (25.12)	Brunei	11 November 2012	World Cup	Singapore, Singapore	
Mixed 4×50m medley relay	2:00.39	h	Nur Hamizah Ahmad (32.52); Haji Abdul Rudi Haji Abdul Rahim (31.77); Amnahliyani Mohamad Husain (31.15); Christian Nazario Nikles (24.95)	Brunei	10 November 2012	World Cup	Singapore, Singapore	

Legend: # – Record awaiting ratification by BASA; e – equalled existing record;
Records not set in finals: h – heat; so – swim-off
