= Rugby sevens at the 2023 Commonwealth Youth Games =

- Venues: Shaw Park Cultural Complex
- Dates: 7–9 August 2023
- Teams: 12

Rugby sevens at the 2023 Commonwealth Youth Games is being held from 7–9 August in Shaw Park Sports Complex, Tobago, Trinidad and Tobago.

== Medalists ==
Event	Gold	Silver	Bronze
Boys	Scotland	Fiji	South Africa
Girls	Australia	Canada	Fiji

== Participating nations ==
Nation	Boys	Girls
Australia	No	Yes
Canada	Yes	Yes
Fiji	Yes	Yes
Jamaica	Yes	No
Kenya	No	Yes
Scotland	Yes	No
South Africa	Yes	No
Trinidad and Tobago	Yes	Yes
Wales	No	Yes
	6	6

== Tournament ==
=== Boys ===
Team	Pld	W	D	L	PF	PA	PD	Pts
Fiji	5	5	0	0	231	20	+211	10
Scotland	5	4	0	1	141	68	+73	8
South Africa	5	3	0	2	187	38	+151	6
Canada	5	2	0	3	136	100	+36	4
Trinidad and Tobago	5	1	0	4	27	224	+197	2
Jamaica	5	0	0	5	14	288	-274	0

Gold medal match

8 August 2023

Fiji	20-25	Scotland
	results

Shaw Park Cultural Complex, Tobago

Bronze medal match

8 August 2023

South Africa	52-0	Canada
	results

Shaw Park Cultural Complex, Tobago
