= Hasely Crawford Stadium =

Stadium in Trinidad and Tobago

Coordinates: 10°39′41″N 61°31′59″W

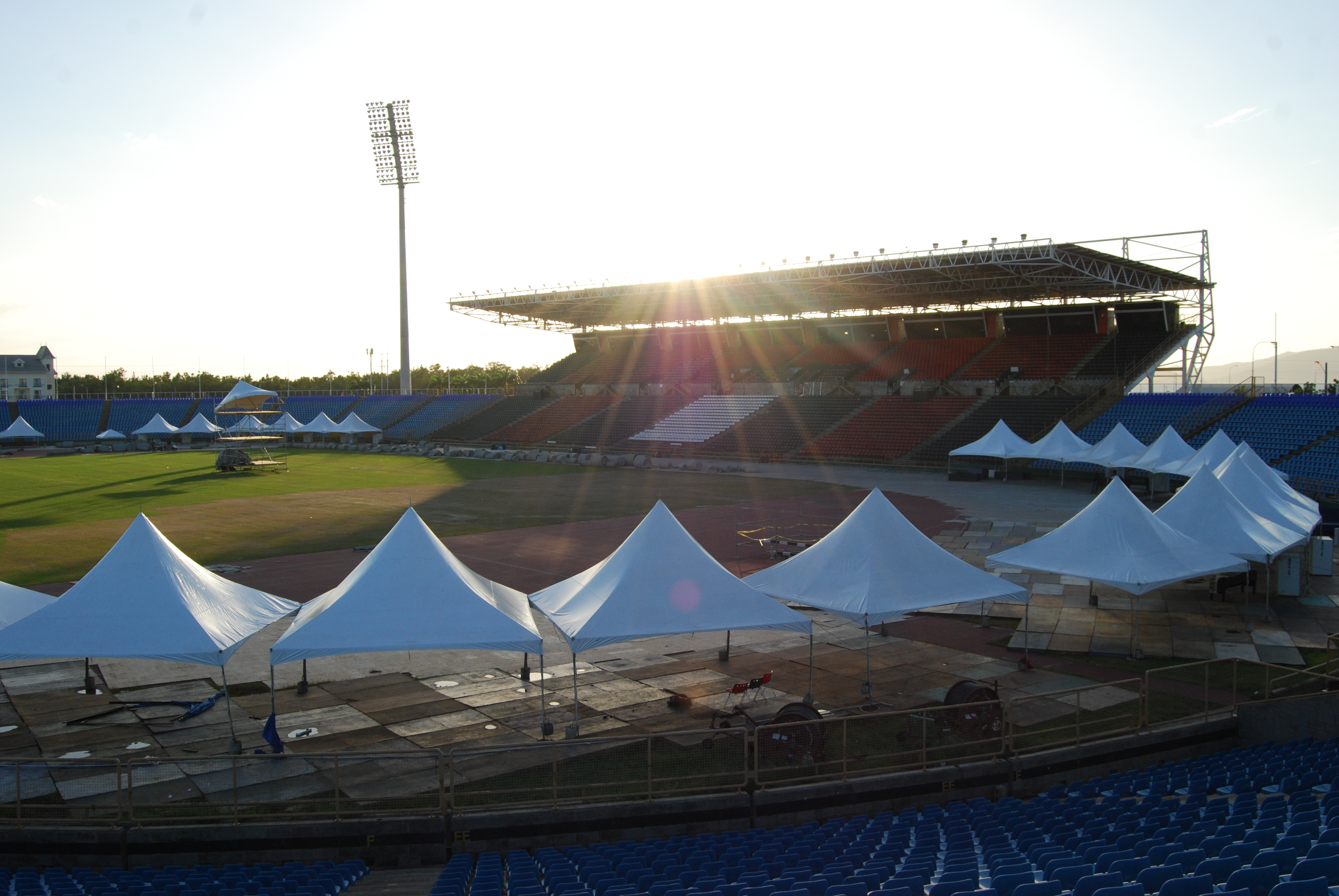
- Interactive map of Hasely Crawford Stadium
- Location: Port of Spain, Trinidad and Tobago
- Owner: Government of Trinidad and Tobago
- Operator: Sports Company of Trinidad and Tobago
- Capacity: 23,000
- Surface: Grass

Construction
- Opened: 12 June 1982

Tenants
- Trinidad and Tobago national football team San Juan Jabloteh F.C. Defence Force F.C.

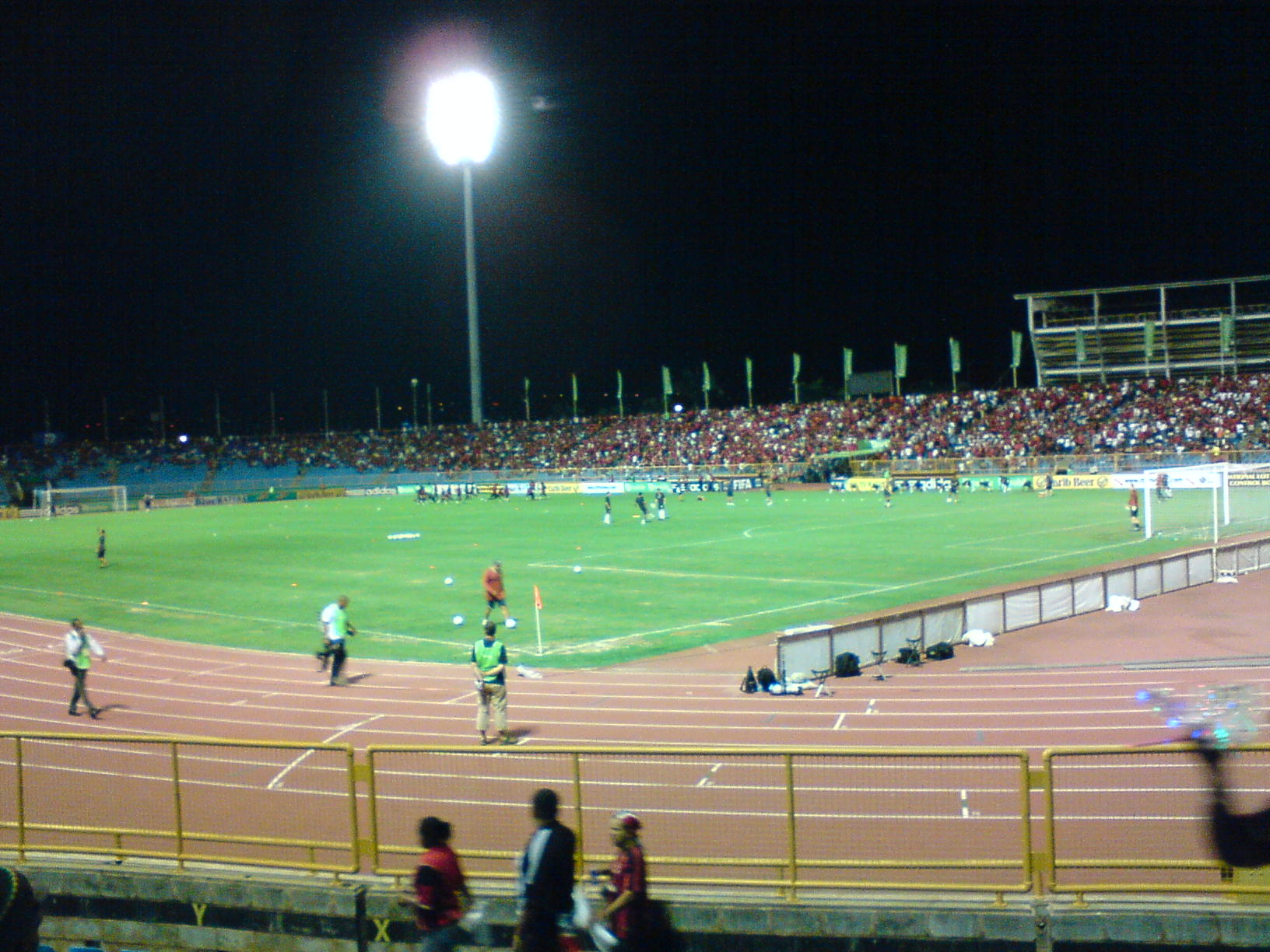
The stadium hosting Trinidad and Tobago vs Cuba qualifying match for the 2010 World Cup.

The Hasely Crawford Stadium, formerly the National Stadium, is located in Port of Spain, Trinidad and Tobago. It was inaugurated and formally opened by Prime Minister George Chambers on 12 June 1982. On 30 December 1996, Prime Minister Basdeo Panday officially designated it "The Hasely Crawford Stadium", after track and field athlete Hasely Crawford, the first person from Trinidad and Tobago to win an Olympic gold medal.

== History ==
The stadium, which is sometimes used by the Trinidad and Tobago national football team, hosted the final of the 2001 FIFA U-17 World Championship. It also hosted 4 games at the 2010 FIFA U-17 Women's World Cup. It hosted athletics and the opening ceremony for the 2023 Commonwealth Youth Games.

Currently the stadium has a capacity of 23,000 with the installation of individual seats. However, on 19 November 1989 Trinidad and Tobago played the US in a winner takes all WC qualifying match in front of somewhere between 30,000 – 40,000 fans. Its theatre-style VIP Room holds 250.

Preceded by North Harbour Stadium; Auckland	FIFA U-17 Women's World Cup; Final Venue; 2010	Succeeded by Tofiq Bahramov Stadium; Baku
