= Swimming at the 2025 SEA Games – Men's 200 metre backstroke =

Men's 200 metre backstroke at the 2025 SEA Games
- Venue: SAT Swimming Pool
- Date: 15 December
- Competitors: 10 from 6 nations
- Winning time: 2:00.62

Medalists
gold medal	Quah Zheng Wen	Singapore
silver medal	Farrel Armandio Tangkas	Indonesia
bronze medal	Tonnam Kanteemool	Thailand

The men's 200 metre backstroke event at the 2025 SEA Games will take place on 15 December 2025 at the SAT Swimming Pool in Bangkok, Thailand.

== Schedule ==
All times are Indochina Standard Time (UTC+07:00)

Date	Time	Event
Monday, 15 December 2025	9:29	Heats
Monday, 15 December 2025	18:50	Final

== Records ==
Prior to this competition, the existing world, Asian, and Southeast Asian Games records were as follows.

World Record	Aaron Peirsol (USA)	1:51.92	Rome, Italy	31 July 2009
Asian Record	Ryosuke Irie (JPN)	1:52.51	Rome, Italy	31 July 2009
Games Record	Quah Zheng Wen (SGP)	2:00.06	Capas, Philippines	6 December 2019

== Results ==
=== Heats ===
Rank	Heat	Lane	Swimmer	Nationality	Time	Notes
1	1	5	Farrel Armandio Tangkas	Indonesia	2:05.52	Q
2	1	4	Trần Hưng Nguyên	Vietnam	2:08.14	Q
3	1	6	Jason Donovan Yusuf	Indonesia	2:09.00	Q
4	1	3	Ratthawit Thammananthachote	Thailand	2:09.15	Q
5	2	5	Zackery Tay	Singapore	2:09.31	Q
6	2	6	Tonnam Kanteemool	Thailand	2:09.74	Q
7	2	4	Quah Zheng Wen	Singapore	2:10.19	Q
8	2	3	Cao Văn Dũng	Vietnam	2:10.25	Q
9	1	2	Joel Ling Thai Yu	Brunei	2:11.41	R, NR
10	2	2	Joran Paul Jamero Orogo	Philippines	2:12.36	R

=== Final ===
Rank	Lane	Swimmer	Nationality	Time	Notes
1st place, gold medalist(s)	1	Quah Zheng Wen	Singapore	2:00.62	
2nd place, silver medalist(s)	4	Farrel Armandio Tangkas	Indonesia	2:01.63	
3rd place, bronze medalist(s)	7	Tonnam Kanteemool	Thailand	2:02.89	
4	5	Trần Hưng Nguyên	Vietnam	2:03.24	
5	2	Zackery Tay	Singapore	2:04.06	
6	8	Cao Văn Dũng	Vietnam	2:04.85	
7	6	Ratthawit Thammananthachote	Thailand	2:06.37	
8	3	Jason Donovan Yusuf	Indonesia	2:07.70	
