= Brunei at the 2019 World Aquatics Championships =

- Flag of Brunei
- FINA code: BRU
- National federation: Brunei Amateur Swimming Federation

in Gwangju, South Korea
- Competitors: 2 in 1 sport
- Medals: Gold 0 Silver 0 Bronze 0 Total 0

World Aquatics Championships appearances
- 1973; 1975; 1978; 1982; 1986; 1991; 1994; 1998; 2001; 2003; 2005; 2007; 2009; 2011; 2013; 2015; 2017; 2019; 2022; 2023; 2024

Brunei competed at the 2019 World Aquatics Championships in Gwangju, South Korea from 12 to 28 July.

== Swimming ==
Brunei entered two swimmers.

Men

Athlete	Event	Heat		Semifinal		Final	
Athlete	Event	Time	Rank	Time	Rank	Time	Rank
Muhammad Isa Ahmad	50 m breaststroke	30.22	60	did not advance			
Muhammad Isa Ahmad	100 m breaststroke	1:06.51	74	did not advance			
Christian Nikles	50 m freestyle	24.69	86	did not advance			
Christian Nikles	100 m freestyle	55.33	98	did not advance			
