= Netball in Brunei =

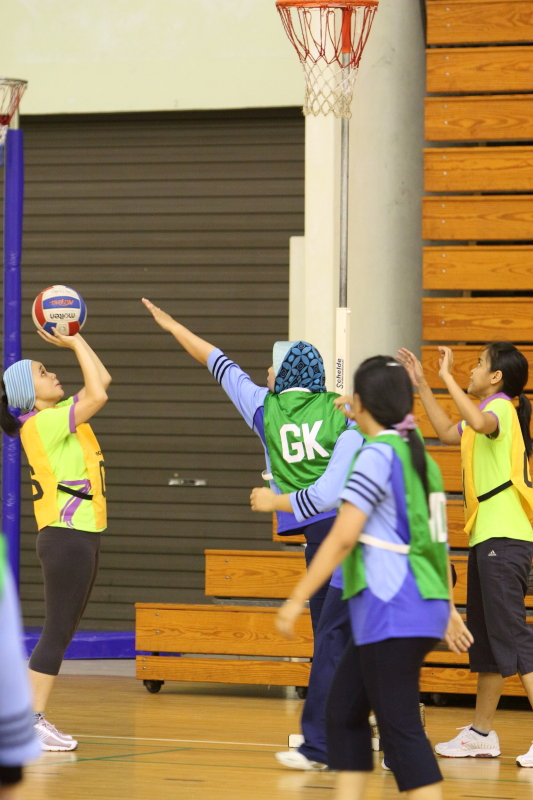
- BKP Netball Tournament at the SHHB Sports Complex in Berakas, Brunei (May 2009).
- Country: Brunei
- National team: Brunei

Netball is a sport available to girls in physical education classes in Brunei.

The national team competed in its first ever international tournament the 2012 Asian Netball Championships.

== See also ==
- Sport in Brunei

== Bibliography ==
- International Federation of Netball Associations (21 January 2011a). "Current World Rankings". Archived from the original on 19 May 2011.
- Williams, Ross (1999). "Three soccer balls, two netballs and no health education. Can healthy outcomes be achieved? A case study of one teacher's efforts to promote healthy lifestyles in a SE Asian high school" (PDF). Archived from the original (PDF) on 26 February 2011.
