= Rugby union in Brunei =

- Country: Brunei
- Governing body: Brunei Rugby Football Union
- National team: Brunei
- First played: 1950s

National competitions
- Rugby World Cup; Rugby World Cup Sevens; IRB Sevens World Series; Asian Five Nations

Rugby Union is a minor sport in Brunei

== Governing body ==
The Brunei Rugby Football Union is the governing body of Rugby Union in Brunei. It is still in its infancy, being admitted into the Asian Rugby Football Union in 2004, and more recently, into the International Rugby Board in 2005. It was set up in 1977, and registered officially as a society in November 2004, and has been formally admitted as an associate member of the Asian Rugby Football Union. It was granted full membership in the game's controlling body, the International Rugby Board in late 2005.

== History ==
Rugby Union, which is played in 105 countries around the world, has already been played in Brunei since the 1950s. According to the archives of the Royal Brunei Yacht Club, a "Town Rugby Football Team" played a team from the Seria district in 1957. In the mid 1970s, rugby in Brunei grew in popularity with the influx of expatriates from Britain and active participation from the Royal Brunei Armed Forces (RBAF), Brunei Shell Recreation Club, Royal Brunei Yacht Club, the Panaga Club and the British Garrison in Seria.

A domestic competition took place from 1978 to 1993, involving regular teams from the Panaga Club, the Royal Brunei Yacht Club, the British Garrison, the Royal Brunei Armed Forces, the Royal Brunei Police, the Brunei Shell recreation Club, Pirates RFC and the Miri RFC from Malaysia.

Numerous clubs also organised Rugby sevens and tens competitions from time to time, but the large number of British and Commonwealth expatriates leaving the sultanate in the late 1990s led to a decline in the number of such tournaments.

== Brunei Rugby 7s 2009 ==
Brunei was one of the countries that hosted the annual Asian Rugby Seven Series in 2009. It was a 2-day event set on the 24th and 25 October at the Hassanal Bolkiah stadium. The Brunei Rugby Football Union (BRFU) have been given a contract to host annual Brunei Sevens rugby tournaments for four years.

Schedule for the Asian Rugby Sevens Series 2009:

Shanghai Sevens, China, September 12–13

Subic Sevens, Philippines, October 10–11

Brunei Sevens, October 24–25

Borneo Sevens, Kota Kinabalu, October 31 - November 1

Kish Island Sevens, Iran, November 20–22

Sri Lanka Sevens, November 28–29

== Brunei national rugby union team ==
The national team has not qualified for the Rugby World Cup yet.

Brunei takes part in the Pacific Asia region of the Asian Five Nations

Brunei also has a national sevens team.
