= Triathlon at the 2023 Commonwealth Youth Games =

- Venue: Tobago Buccoo Beach, Tobago
- Dates: August 6, 2023–August 8, 2023
- Competitors: 47 from 19 nations

Triathlon at the 2023 Commonwealth Youth Games was held from 6–8 August 2023. The venue will be Tobago Buccoo Beach, Tobago, Trinidad and Tobago.

== Participating nations ==
- Australia (4)
- Bahamas (2)
- Barbados (3)
- Bermuda (4)
- Cyprus (2)
- Fiji (2)
- Ghana (1)
- Grenada (1)
- India (4)
- Jamaica (1)
- Jersey (2)
- Kenya (2)
- Malta (3)
- Namibia (4)
- Northern Ireland (2)
- South Africa (3)
- Scotland (2)
- Singapore (2)
- Trinidad and Tobago (3) (host)

== Medalists ==
Event	Gold		Silver		Bronze	
Boys	Luke Holmes; Jersey	29:47	Alex Robin; Scotland	30:03	Jack Latham; Australia	30:38
Girls	Aspen Anderson; Australia	32:53	Jessica Heeps; Scotland	33:17	Maja Brinkmann; Namibia	34:04
Mixed relay	Jack Latham; Aspen Anderson; Australia	40.58	Alex Robin; Jessica Heeps; Scotland	41.23	Luke Holmes; Siena Stephans; Jersey	41.38

== Medal table ==
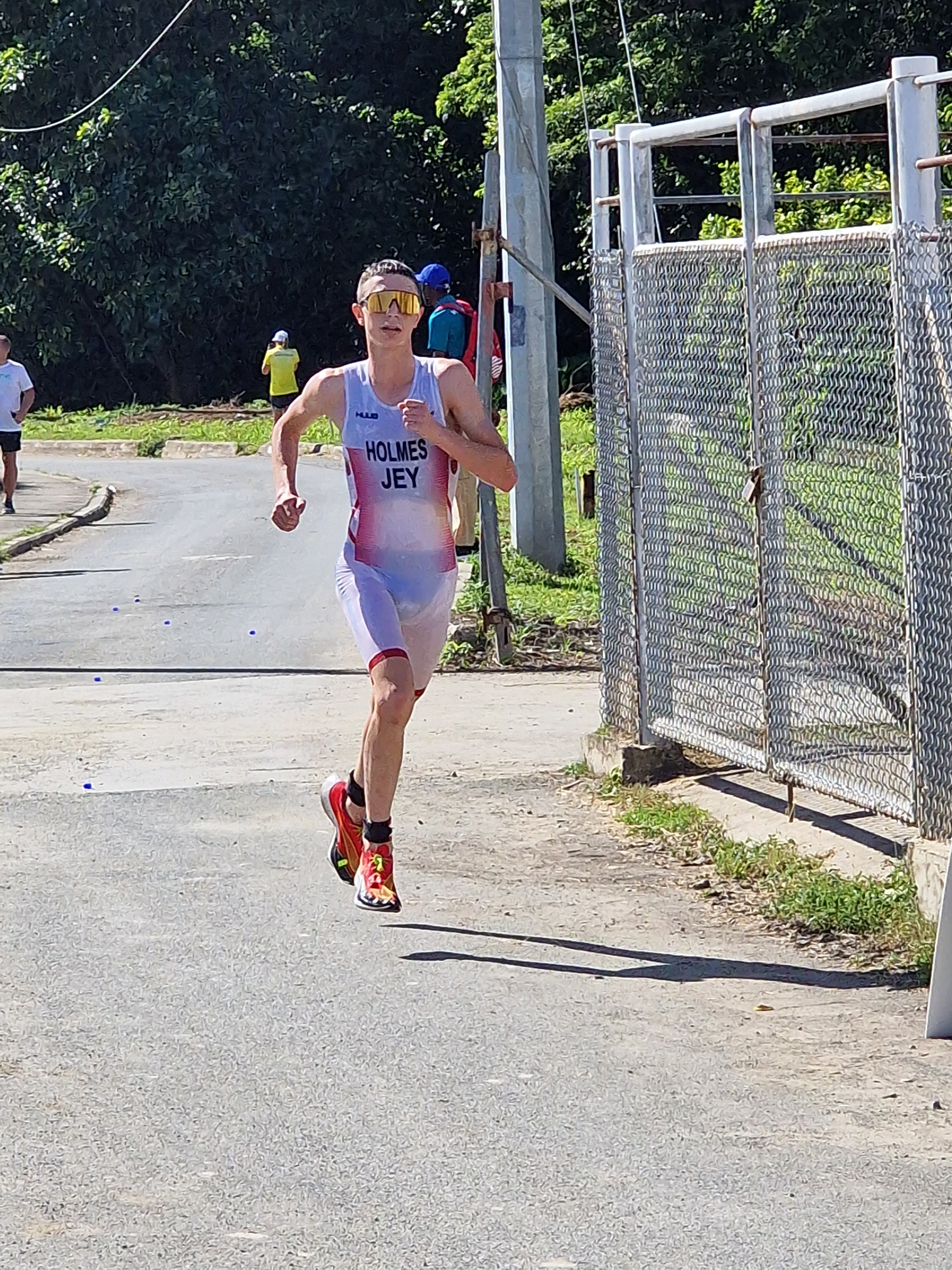
Luke Holmes, leads towards the end of the first leg Mixed Team Relay Triathlon at Buccoo Beach

* Host nation (Trinidad and Tobago)

Rank	Nation	Gold	Silver	Bronze	Total
1	Australia	2	0	1	3
2	Jersey	1	0	1	2
3	Scotland	0	3	0	3
4	Namibia	0	0	1	1
Totals (4 entries)		3	3	3	9
