= Black Rock, Trinidad and Tobago =

- Village
- Location within Trinidad and Tobago Location within the Caribbean Location within North America
- Country: Trinidad and Tobago
- Island: Tobago

Population
  - Total: 1,923 (2,011)

Black Rock is a seaside village on the island of Tobago.

== History ==
Black Rock hosted the beach volleyball at the 2023 Commonwealth Youth Games.

== Notable people ==
- Stanford Callender, politician.
- A. P. T. James, politician.

== See also ==
- List of cities and towns in Trinidad and Tobago
