= 2023 Commonwealth Youth Games =

Youth sporting event in Trinidad and Tobago

VII Commonwealth Youth Games
- Logo
- Country: Trinidad and Tobago
- Motto: One Heart, One Nation, One Spirit
- Nations: 68
- Athletes: 1000
- Events: 93 in 7 sports
- Opening: 4 August 2023
- Closing: 11 August 2023
- Opened by: President Christine Kangaloo
- Main venue: Hasely Crawford Stadium, Trinidad (athletics, opening ceremony); Pigeon Point, Tobago (closing ceremony)
- Website: Trinbago 2023

The 2023 Commonwealth Youth Games, officially known as the VII Commonwealth Youth Games and as Trinbago 2023, were a youth sporting event for members of the Commonwealth that was held in Trinidad and Tobago. They were the seventh edition of the Commonwealth Youth Games. The games were initially scheduled between 1 and 7 August 2021 but were postponed and held from 4 to 11 August 2023 as a result of the global COVID-19 pandemic and scheduling issues with the 2020 Summer Olympics and the 2022 Commonwealth Games.

The 2023 Commonwealth Youth Games were the first to be held since the death of Queen Elizabeth II and the accession of King Charles III as Head of the Commonwealth and the reigning monarch of the Commonwealth Realms on 8 September 2022. They were also the first to be held in the Caribbean, and the first to include para-sports.

This was the last Commonwealth Games to take place under the CGF presidency of Dame Louise Martin.

== Host selection ==
The 2023 Commonwealth Youth Games went through three extensive host selections.

=== First selection ===
==== Accepted bid ====
- Belfast, Northern Ireland

With the backing of the Northern Ireland Assembly and the Commonwealth Games Council for Northern Ireland, Belfast submitted an official bid for the games. On 29 November 2015, it was confirmed that Northern Ireland was the only official, and thus the preferred, bid. They were named the official hosts in January 2016, with the Games originally scheduled for 27 July to 1 August 2021. Robert McVeigh, the Chair of the Northern Ireland Commonwealth Games Council, said he was "delighted" that the bid was successful.

In June 2018, Belfast was stripped of the Games due to uncertainty surrounding funding for the event during the absence of a functioning Northern Ireland Executive. This was as £3 million of grants had not been signed off by the Executive before it collapsed in January 2017, meaning the Games had a significant funding gap.

==== Withdrawn bids ====
- Gaborone, Botswana

The Botswana National Olympic Committee stated it was preparing a bid for the 2021 Commonwealth Youth Games, but later withdrew from consideration.

- Saint Helier, Jersey

Jersey was considering a bid in early 2015 but pulled out of the bidding process in June 2015. The withdrawal came as Botswana and Northern Ireland placed bids - Paul du Feu, Jersey's Commonwealth Games Association leader commented that "when you're up against opposition with a bigger population and totally different infrastructure you have to be realistic".

=== Second selection ===
Following the stripping of the games from Belfast, a new selection process has been initiated, which lasted for six months. Trinidad and Tobago was announced as new host on 21 June 2019.

==== Accepted second bid ====
- Trinidad and Tobago

==== Other bids ====
- Gibraltar City, Gibraltar

=== Third selection ===
Following the postponement, Trinidad and Tobago were elected host of the 2023 Commonwealth Youth Games in Birmingham, England at the Commonwealth Games Federation general assembly.

==== Accepted third bid ====
- Trinidad and Tobago

== Postponement ==
Since the spread of the COVID-19 pandemic, the Tokyo Olympic and Paralympic Games were moved to 2021 during the original dates of the Commonwealth Youth Games, the CGF considered the best alternative options and time frames for holding the event in the future, potentially in 2023, to avoid clashing with the Birmingham 2022 Commonwealth Games, with Trinidad and Tobago having the first option to hold the event. On 26 July 2022, it was announced that the 7th Commonwealth Youth Games will be held in 2023 in Trinidad and Tobago.

== Marketing ==
=== Mascot ===
On 16 March 2023, the Minister of Sport and Community Development, Shamfa Cudjoe, revealed the games' mascot, Cocoyea, a Leatherback sea turtle. The mascot was designed by Djibril Annisette, who won a design competition that was run for children.

== Participation ==
68 of the 72 Commonwealth Games Associations participated in the games. Maldives, Norfolk Island, Sierra Leone did not compete, along with Gabon and Togo, new members of the Commonwealth which had not yet joined the Commonwealth Games Federation. Gambia was scheduled to compete but withdrew due to not getting visas in time.

Participating Commonwealth Games Association *
- Antigua and Barbuda
- Australia
- Barbados
- Bangladesh
- Bermuda
- Belize
- Botswana
- Brunei
- Canada
- Cayman Islands
- Cyprus
- Dominica
- England
- Fiji
- Gambia
- Gibraltar
- Grenada
- Guyana
- India
- Isle of Man
- Jamaica
- Jersey
- Kenya
- Malaysia (14)
- Mozambique
- Namibia
- New Zealand
- Northern Ireland
- Pakistan
- Papua New Guinea
- Rwanda
- Saint Kitts and Nevis
- Saint Lucia
- Saint Vincent and the Grenadines
- Seychelles
- Scotland
- South Africa
- Sri Lanka
- Trinidad and Tobago (Host)
- Vanuatu
- Wales

*As confirmed by 1 August 2023.

== Ceremonies ==
=== Opening ceremony ===
The opening ceremony took place on 4 August 2023 in Hasely Crawford Stadium in Port of Spain, Trinidad. It was themed as a Trinidad and Tobago carnival.

The traditional parade of nations was led by the Bahamas (as the host of the previous games), followed by the rest of the nations from the Americas. Following this, nations entered by region in order from Africa, Asia, Europe, Oceania, and lastly the Caribbean. The host nation, Trinidad and Tobago, entered last. Each nation was preceded by a placard bearer carrying a circular board containing the respective nation's flag.

The games were opened by President Christine Kangaloo and were attended by Commonwealth Games Federation President Louise Martin, Prime Minister Keith Rowley, and his wife. A smaller ceremony was held in Tobago the same day.

=== Closing ceremony ===
The closing ceremony took place on 11 August 2023 in Pigeon Point, Tobago. In addition to the opening ceremony, the closing ceremony was also carnival themed.

== The Games ==
A total of 93 events over seven sports was contested.

2023 Commonwealth Youth Games
- Athletics (34)
- Beach volleyball (2)
- Cycling
  - Road cycling (4)
  - Track cycling (12)
- Netball Fast 5 (1)
- Rugby sevens (2)
- Swimming (35)
- Triathlon (3)

=== Calendar ===
OC	Opening ceremony	●	Event competitions	1	Event finals	CC	Closing ceremony

August		4 Fri	5 Sat	6 Sun	7 Mon	8 Tue	9 Wed	10 Thu	11 Fri	Medal events
Ceremonies (opening / closing)		OC							CC	—N/a
Athletics					8	8	7	11		34
Beach volleyball			●	●	●	●	●	2		2
Cycling
Cycling	Road		2		2					4
Cycling	Track					1	4	7		12
Fast5 Netball						●	●	1		1
Swimming				9	9	9	8			35
Rugby sevens				●	●	2				2
Triathlon				2		1				3
Total Medal events			2	11	19	21	19	21		93
Cumulative total			2	13	32	53	72	93		—N/a
		4 Fri	5 Sat	6 Sun	7 Mon	8 Tue	9 Wed	10 Thu	11 Fri	Medal events

== Medal table ==
* Host nation (Trinidad and Tobago)

Rank	CGA	Gold	Silver	Bronze	Total
1	Australia	26	17	21	64
2	England	16	23	10	49
3	Scotland	12	11	5	28
4	South Africa	7	6	7	20
5	Nigeria	6	2	0	8
6	Kenya	5	4	0	9
7	Trinidad and Tobago*	4	5	6	15
8	Northern Ireland	4	2	2	8
9	Wales	3	6	6	15
10	Cayman Islands	2	1	3	6
11	Guyana	2	1	1	4
12	Canada	2	1	0	3
13	Jamaica	2	0	2	4
14	Jersey	1	2	2	5
14	Malaysia	1	2	2	5
16	New Zealand	0	3	6	9
17	India	0	2	3	5
18	Bahamas	0	2	2	4
19	Fiji	0	1	2	3
19	Uganda	0	1	2	3
21	Sri Lanka	0	1	1	2
22	Barbados	0	0	2	2
22	Isle of Man	0	0	2	2
22	Namibia	0	0	2	2
22	Saint Lucia	0	0	2	2
26	Antigua and Barbuda	0	0	1	1
26	Cyprus	0	0	1	1
26	Grenada	0	0	1	1
Totals (28 entries)		93	93	94	280

== Venues ==
Event		Venue		No. of events			
Event		Venue		Men	Women	Mixed	Total
Athletics		Trinidad	Hasely Crawford Stadium	13	13	2	28
Para athletics		Trinidad	Hasely Crawford Stadium	3	3	—N/a	6
Cycling	Road	Trinidad	Brian Lara Cricket Academy Cycling Track	2	2	—N/a	4
Cycling	Track	Trinidad	National Cycling Velodrome	6	6	—N/a	12
Swimming		Trinidad	National Aquatics Stadium	16	16	3	35
Beach volleyball		Tobago	Courland Beach Sports Arena, Black Rock	1	1	—N/a	2
Netball		Tobago	Shaw Park Cultural Complex	—N/a	1	—N/a	1
Rugby sevens		Tobago	Shaw Park Cultural Complex	1	1	—N/a	2
Triathlon		Tobago	Tobago Buccoo Beach	1	1	1	3
				43	44	6	93
