= Brunei Rugby Football Union =

Governing body of rugby union in Brunei

Kesatuan Sepakbola Ragbi Brunei
- Sport: Rugby union
- Founded: 1977; 49 years ago
- World Rugby affiliation: 2013
- Asia Rugby affiliation: 2004
- Headquarters: 0
- Location: 0
- Patron: 0
- Chairman: 0
- President: Dr Haji Kamaruddin bin Dato Paduka Haji Talib
- Director of International Relations: Ainol Razman Mohd Ghazaly
- Men's coach: 0
- Women's coach: 0
- Sevens coach: 0
- Website: BruneiRugby.wordpress.com

The Brunei Rugby Football Union (BRFU; Malay: Kesatuan Sepakbola Ragbi Brunei - KSRB) is the governing body of rugby union in Brunei Darussalam.

== History ==
Rugby union, which is played in 105 countries around the world, has been played in Brunei since the 1950s. Despite the fact that the Brunei Rugby Football Union has been around since 1977, it was never officially registered with the Registrar of Societies until November 2004.

The Brunei Rugby Football Union is still in its infancy. It registered officially as a society in November 2004, and was admitted into Asia Rugby in 2004. It became an associate member of World Rugby in 2013.

It administers the Brunei national rugby union team.

== See also ==
- Rugby union in Brunei
- Ministry of Culture, Youth and Sports (Brunei)
- Borneo Games
- Sabah Rugby Academy
