= Cycling at the 2023 Commonwealth Youth Games =

- Venue: Couva, Trinidad
- Location: Trinidad and Tobago

Cycling at the 2023 Commonwealth Youth Games will be scheduled to held from 8–10 August 2023. The track events will be held at National Cycling Velodrome while the road events will be held near Brian Lara Cricket Academy in Couva, Trinidad, Trinidad and Tobago.

== Road ==
Boys

Event	Gold		Silver		Bronze	
Time trial	Miles Bailey Liebenberg; South Africa	19:17.63	Elliot Rowe; Scotland	19:21.01	Will Heath; Australia	19:35.24
Road race	Oisin Ferriti; Northern Ireland	1:33.05	Max Bufton; Wales	1:33.05	Newjeo Lau; Malaysia	1:33.25

Girls

Event	Gold		Silver		Bronze	
Time trial	Lauren Emily Bates; Australia	14:09.31	Keira Will; Australia	14:31.89	Ruby Oakes; Isle of Man	14:31.91
Road race	Keira Will; Australia	1:29.00	Lauren Emily Bates; Australia	1:29.00	Ruby Oakes; Isle of Man	1:32.47

== Track ==
Boys

Event	Gold	Silver	Bronze
Individual pursuit	Calum Moir; Scotland	Sam Fisher; Wales	Noah Blannin; Australia
Time trial	Tayte Ryan; Australia	Calum Moir; Scotland	Muhammad Hafiq Mohd Jafri; Malaysia
Scratch race	Samuel McKee; Australia	Ethan Garth Kulsen; South Africa	Calum Moir; Scotland
Points race	Calum Moir; Scotland	Sam Fisher; Wales	Noah Blannin; Australia
Sprint	Tayte Ryan; Australia	Syndel Samaroo; Trinidad and Tobago	Danell James; Trinidad and Tobago
Keirin	Tayte Ryan; Australia	Darwish Putra Muhd Sanusi; Malaysia	Syndel Samaroo; Trinidad and Tobago

Girls

Event	Gold	Silver	Bronze
Individual pursuit	Keira Will; Australia	Lauren Emily Bates; Australia	Millie Thomson; Scotland
Time trial	Liliya Tatarinoff; Australia	Sarah Johnson; Scotland	Makaira Wallace; Trinidad and Tobago
Scratch race	Lauren Emily Bates; Australia	Millie Thomson; Scotland	Keira Will; Australia
Points race	Lauren Emily Bates; Australia	Keira Will; Australia	Millie Thomson; Scotland
Sprint	Sarah Johnson; Scotland	Nur Alyssa Mohd Farid; Malaysia	Liliya Tatarinoff; Australia
Keirin	Sarah Johnson; Scotland	Makaira Wallace; Trinidad and Tobago	Liliya Tatarinoff; Australia

== Medal table ==
=== Medal table road ===
* Host nation (Trinidad and Tobago)

Rank	Nation	Gold	Silver	Bronze	Total
1	Australia	2	2	1	5
2	Northern Ireland	1	0	0	1
2	South Africa	1	0	0	1
4	Scotland	0	1	0	1
4	Wales	0	1	0	1
6	Isle of Man	0	0	2	2
7	Malaysia	0	0	1	1
Totals (7 entries)		4	4	4	12

=== Medal table track ===
* Host nation (Trinidad and Tobago)

Rank	Nation	Gold	Silver	Bronze	Total
1	Australia	8	2	5	15
2	Scotland	4	3	3	10
3	Trinidad and Tobago*	0	2	3	5
4	Malaysia	0	2	1	3
5	Wales	0	2	0	2
6	South Africa	0	1	0	1
Totals (6 entries)		12	12	12	36
