= Zeke Chan =

Bruneian swimmer (born 2007)

Zeke Chan 曾子悦
Personal information
- Full name: Zeke Chan Zhi Yue
- National team: Brunei
- Born: 30 August 2007 (age 18) Brunei
- Height: 5 ft 10 in (178 cm)

Sport
- Sport: Swimming
- Strokes: Backstroke, Freestyle
- Club: Mabohai Swimming Club
Medal record
Men's swimming
Representing Brunei
Event	1st	2nd	3rd
Southeast Asian Swimming Championships	0	2	0
Total	0	2	0
Southeast Asian Age Groups Swimming Championships
Silver medal – second place	2023 Jakarta	100 m backstroke
Silver medal – second place	2023 Jakarta	4×100 m medley

Zeke Chan
- Simplified Chinese: 曾子悦
- Traditional Chinese: 曾子悅
Transcriptions
Standard Mandarin
- Hanyu Pinyin: Céng Ziyuè

Zeke Chan Zhi Yue (Chinese: 曾子悦; pinyin: Zēng Zǐyuè; born 30 August 2007) is a Bruneian swimmer who competed in the 2024 Summer Olympics.

== Early life and education ==
Chan attends Jerudong International School in addition to swimming for the Brunei national team. At nine years old, he began taking swim classes. However, it wasn't until he was eleven years old that he began swimming competitively with his childhood swimming club, Mabohai Swimming Club. He has pursued a variety of different interests over the years, including boxing, basketball, drumming, and other sports. He represented his school at the swimming competition during the 1st Brunei Darussalam Schools Games.

He completed his IGCSE Edexcel course with 6 A*s, 1 A, and 2 Bs, despite the fact that he trains nine times a week (twice a day on Monday, Thursday, and Saturday). He said that he will pursue the International Baccalaureate for his pre-university course, and that swimming would be an integral component of his university preparation.

== Swimming career ==
Chan, the youngest contender from Brunei, improved his performance from 35.20 seconds to 34.61 seconds in the boys' 13 and under 50-mter butterfly event on 11 November 2017, during the 41st Southeast Asian Age Groups Swimming Championships.

On 24 June 2022, Chan finished 14th in the men's 200-meter freestyle, clocking in at 2:00.46s, at the 17th Singapore National Championships. He later helped the men's 4×100-meter freestyle relay team win the 2023 SEA Games in Cambodia on 10 May 2023, with a time of 3:38.20. Then, on 8 August 2023, in the men's 200-meter backstroke, a time of 2:11.72 earned 15th place in the 2023 Commonwealth Youth Games in Trinidad and Tobago.

At the 45th Southeast Asian Age Groups Swimming Championships in 2023, in Jakarta, Chan took home a silver medals, which was Brunei's first medals in the competition in ten years. On 24 August, he won the silver medal in the boy's 16–18 100-meter backstroke. In the process, he broke the previous national record, finishing in 59.18 seconds. His prior best, which he set in July at the World Aquatics Championships in Japan, was beaten by the time. He then proceeded to clock 2:12.24 in the 200-meter event. The mixed 4×100-meter medley relay team won the same event the following day with a timing of 4:27.53.

Chan has produced a number of noteworthy outcomes in the World Aquatics Championships. The men's 100-meter backstroke finished in 56th place with a time of 59.61 at Fukuoka, Japan, while he finished in 98th place in the men's 100-meter freestyle with a time of 55.37 in 2023. The men's 200-meter backstroke performance in Doha, Qatar in 2024 yielded a 33rd-place finish with a time of 2:12.94, while men's 100-meter backstroke performance finished in 50th place with a time of 1:00.49.

At the 11th Asian Age Group Aquatics Championships held in the Philippines on 26 February 2024, the men's 50-meter butterfly time of 28.30 and the men's 200-meter medley time of 2:14.37 placed them in 16th place, respectively. The next day, he finished 16th in the men's 50-meter freestyle event with a time of 24.81, and he finished 16th in the men's 50-meter backstroke event with a time of 28.11.

In Paris, France, three athletes from Brunei will be competing in the 2024 Olympic Games. The eight members of the contingent consisted of Muhd Noor Firdaus Ar-Rasyid, a sprinter, and national swimmers Zeke Chan and Hayley Wong Ann Yue. Chan would participate in the 100-meter breaststroke. He and Wong carried the Bruneian flag during the Parade of Nations on 26 July 2024. He finished at number 45 in the qualifying Heat 1 in a timing of 1:00.38 seconds.
