= Hayley Wong =

Bruneian swimmer (born 2008)

Hayley Wong 黄安玉
Personal information
- Full name: Hayley Wong Ann Yue
- National team: Brunei
- Born: 13 May 2008 (age 18) Brunei
- Height: 164 cm (5 ft 5 in)

Sport
- Sport: Swimming
- Strokes: Backstroke, Freestyle, Butterfly
- Club: Dolphin Swimming Club
Medal record
Women's swimming
Representing Brunei
Southeast Asian Age Groups Swimming Championships
Bronze medal – third place	2023 Jakarta	50 m butterfly

Hayley Wong
- Simplified Chinese: 黄安玉
- Traditional Chinese: 黃安玉
Transcriptions
Standard Mandarin
- Hanyu Pinyin: Huáng Ānyù

Hayley Wong Ann Yue (Chinese: 黄安玉; pinyin: Huáng Ānyù; born 13 May 2008) is a Bruneian swimmer who competed in the 2024 Summer Olympics.

== Education ==
Wong attends Pengiran Anak Puteri Hajah Masna Secondary School in Kampong Sungai Akar, Bandar Seri Begawan. She represented her school at the swimming competition during the 1st Brunei Darussalam Schools Games. She is a member of the Dolphin Swimming Club.

== Swimming career ==
At 14-year-old, Wong made her international swimming debut in the 200-meter butterfly and 200-meter individual medley at the Budapest, Hungary, 2022 World Aquatics Championships (placed 25th and 37th, respectively).

The Brunei delegation consisting of female swimmer Hayley Wong and male swimmers Joel Ling and Zeke Chan participated in the 2023 World Aquatics Championships on Wednesday at the Marine Messe Fukuoka in Fukuoka, Japan. Manager Linda Lai and head coach Wu Na oversee the national team. Wong signed up for the Brunei squad's first competition on 22 July in the 100-meter butterfly event. She finished 25th in a timing of 2:35.48 seconds, not good enough to go to the semi-finals.

On 6 August 2023, Wong made history as she broke two new national records during the 7th Commonwealth Youth Games in Trinidad and Tobago. In the women's 50-meter butterfly event, she broke the previous national record at the National Aquatics Stadium with a timing of 29.31 seconds. On the following day, she broke her third consecutive national record in the women's 50-meter breaststroke event with a time of 35.19 seconds, surpassing the 35.57 second national record after her successes in the 50- and 200-meter breaststroke.

On 25 August 2023, in Jakarta, during the 45th Southeast Asian Age Groups Swimming Championships, Wong won the bronze medal in the girl's 14–15 50-meter butterfly event. At the Gelora Bung Karno Aquatic Stadium, the 15-year-old finished third out of 14 swimmers with a time of 29.42 seconds. She finished with a time of 5:29.06, smashing the old record of 5:34.15 in the 400-meter individual medley.

Wong began the 7th Brunei Open & Masters Swimming Championships in 4:49.78 for the 400-meter freestyle, ended the 50-meter freestyle in 27.26 seconds, completed the 100-meter freestyle in 59.93 seconds on the following day of competition, and finished the 200-meter Individual Medley in 2:28.86 seconds, followed by a time of 28.78 seconds in the 50-meter butterfly. Six gold medals were hers from the International School Brunei pool in Salambigar.

Wong participated in the Women's 100m Breaststroke at the 11th Asian Age Group Aquatics Championships, which were held in the Philippines from 26 to 29 February 2024. She finished with a time of 1:20.07. She competed in three events on 27 February: the women's 50-meter freestyle, where she finished in 28.89 seconds; the women's 50-meter breaststroke, where she finished in 34.91 seconds; and the women's 100-meter butterfly, where she finished in 1:08.78 seconds. She finished the women's 200-meter freestyle swim on 28 February in 2:22.01. Ultimately, on 29 February, she participated in the Women's 50m Butterfly, finishing in 30.30, and the Women's 200m Breaststroke, finishing in 2:59.92.

Wong competed in the women's 100-meter breaststroke and 100-meter freestyle events at the World Aquatics Championships in Doha, Qatar, in February 2024. Her times were 1:20.28 and 1:03.49, respectively. She later competed in several events at the 11th Asian Age Group Championships in the Philippines, winning top marks in the women's 50-meter freestyle, 50-meter breaststroke, 100-meter butterfly, 200-meter freestyle, and 50-meter butterfly. Two notable times were 28.89 in the 50-meter freestyle and 34.91 in the 50-meter breaststroke.

Wong achieved a national record of 27.94 seconds in the 50-meter freestyle in 2024 at the ASEAN School Games in Da Nang, Vietnam, finishing in 28 seconds for the first time. She received certificates of recognition and Incentives for Sports Excellence (IKS) awards from the Minister of Education, Romaizah Mohd Salleh.

In Paris, France, three athletes from Brunei will be competing in the 2024 Olympic Games. The eight members of the contingent consisted of Muhd Noor Firdaus Ar-Rasyid, a sprinter, and national swimmers Chan and Wong. Wong plans to compete in the women's 50 metre freestyle. She and Chan carried the Bruneian flag during the Parade of Nations on 26 July 2024. Despite placing second in heat 4, she finished with a time of 28.52, ranking 50, meaning she was not eligible for the semifinals.
