= Christian Nikles =

Bruneian swimmer

Personal information
- Full name: Christian Nazario Anak Nikles
- Nickname: Benteke
- Born: 26 December 1997 (age 28) Bandar Seri Begawan, Brunei
- Height: 175 cm (5 ft 9 in)
- Weight: 73 kg (161 lb)

Sport
- Sport: Swimming
- Strokes: Freestyle
- Club: ISB Hammerheads
- College team: University of Stirling

Christian Nikles (born 26 December 1997) is a Bruneian sprint freestyle swimmer.

He competed at the 2011 World Aquatics Championships in the 50 metre and 100 metre freestyle events, where he failed to advance to the semi-finals.

In 2019, he represented Brunei at the 2019 World Aquatics Championships held in Gwangju, South Korea and competed in the men's 50 metre freestyle and 100 metre freestyle events. He failed to advance to the semi-finals in either event.

== See also ==
- List of swimmers
- Brunei at the 2011 World Aquatics Championships
