= Brunei at the 2011 World Aquatics Championships =

Sporting event delegation

Flag of Brunei

Brunei competed at the 2011 World Aquatics Championships in Shanghai, China between July 16 and 31, 2011.

== Swimming ==
As per the qualifying system, two swimmers from Brunei qualified for the championships.

Men

Athlete	Event	Heats		Semifinals		Final	
Athlete	Event	Time	Rank	Time	Rank	Time	Rank
Christian Nikles	Men's 50m Freestyle	25.86	72	did not advance			
Christian Nikles	Men's 100m Freestyle	57.44	81	did not advance			
Anderson Lim	Men's 200m Freestyle	2:06.40	59	did not advance			
Anderson Lim	Men's 400m Freestyle	4:34.95	47			did not advance	
