= Golden Jubilee of Hassanal Bolkiah =

50th anniversary of the monarch's accession

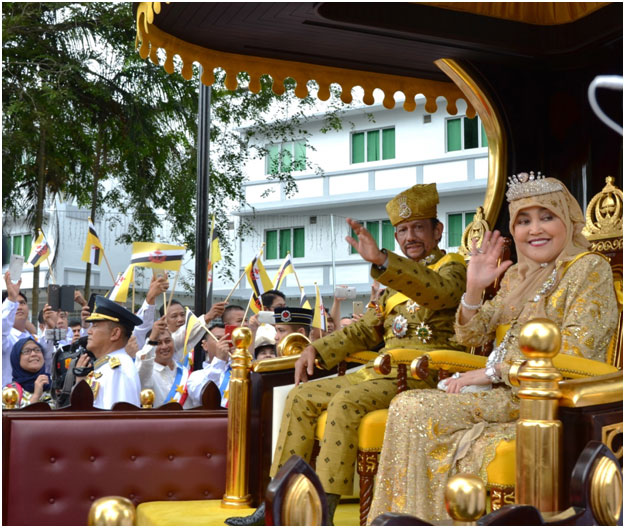
- Sultan Hassanal Bolkiah and Pengiran Anak Saleha being transported in the royal chariot
- Genre: Jubilee of Brunei monarch
- Date: 5 October 2017
- Location: Bandar Seri Begawan
- Country: Brunei
- Previous event: Silver Jubilee of Hassanal Bolkiah

The Golden Jubilee of Hassanal Bolkiah (Malay: Jubli Emas Hassanal Bolkiah) was a celebration held throughout Brunei Darussalam in October 2017 to celebrate the Sultan Hassanal Bolkiah's Golden Jubilee; his 50th year on the Bruneian throne.

== Background ==
On 5 October 2017, Brunei made its history when His Majesty Sultan Haji Hassanal Bolkiah Mu’izzaddin Waddaulah, the 29th Sultan of Brunei, become the third monarch to celebrate Golden Jubilee, marking his 50 years reign on the Throne of Brunei. Hassanal Bolkiah ascended the Throne as the 29th Sultan of Brunei on 5 October 1967 after following the voluntary abdication of his father, Sultan Omar Ali Saifuddien Saadul Khairi Waddien. The Sultan had celebrated his Silver Jubilee to mark the 25th year of his reign on the Throne on 5 October 1992.

In conjunction with his Golden Jubilee celebration, the Sultan declared Thursday, 5 October 2017 to be a public holiday.

== Main programmes ==
=== Royal ceremonies ===
The Golden Jubilee celebrations of Sultan Hassanal Bolkiah's Accession to the Throne in October 2017 as follows:

Date	Time	Ceremony	Place
Tuesday, 3 October	08:00	The Opening of Gendang Jaga-Jaga Ceremony	Lapau, Bandar Seri Begawan
Wednesday, 4 October	20:00	Mass Fardhu Maghrib and Isya Prayers and Doa Kesyukuran	Jame' Asr Hassanil Bolkiah Mosque, Kampong Kiarong
Thursday, 5 October	07:15	The Royal Parade and Audience Ceremony	Indera Buana Throne Hall, Istana Nurul Iman
Thursday, 5 October	09:00	Royal Procession surrounding Bandar Seri Begawan	Bandar Seri Begawan
Friday, 6 October	19:00	Royal Banquet	Banquet Hall, Istana Nurul Iman
Sunday, 8 October	14:00	The Doa Selamat and the Closing of Gendang Jaga-Jaga Ceremony	Istana Nurul Iman
Wednesday, 11 October	13:30	Khatam Al Quran Ceremony	Istana Nurul Iman
Saturday, 14 October	19:30	The Opening Ceremony of the Sungai Kebun Bridge (Raja Isteri Pengiran Anak Hajah Saleha Bridge), Procession of Decorated Floats and Firework Display	Bandar Seri Begawan
Wednesday, 18 October	14:00	Tahlil Ceremony	Royal Mausoleum, Bandar Seri Begawan
Sunday, 22 October	07:15	Procession of Decorated Vehicles, Opening Ceremony of Eco-Corridor Park (Taman Mahkota Jubli Emas) and Mass Junjung Kasih and Kesyukuran Ceremony	Taman Mahkota Jubli Emas, Bandar Seri Begawan

All the Golden Jubilee ceremonies were broadcast nationwide by the Radio Television Brunei, the Brunei government's main broadcasting body.

=== Other ceremonies ===
- Flag hoisting in conjunction of the Golden Jubilee Celebration, 1 October until 31 October 2017.
- Forum Melayu Islam Beraja (MIB) at all four district of Brunei-Muara, Tutong, Belait and Temburong, in conjunction of the Golden Jubilee Celebration, 2 October until 12 October 2017.

== Foreign guests ==
=== Heads of state and consorts ===
Country	Name	Title
Malaysia	Sultan Muhammad V	Yang Di Pertuan Agong of Malaysia
Johor	Sultan Ibrahim Ismail and Raja Zarith Sofiah	Sultan and Permaisuri of Johor
Pahang	Tengku Abdullah Sultan Ahmad Shah and Tunku Azizah Aminah Maimunah Iskandariah	Regent and Tengku Puan of Pahang
Penang	Tun Dato' Seri Utama Haji Abdul Rahman bin Haji Abbas	Yang Di Pertua Negeri of Pulau Pinang
Perak	Sultan Nazrin Muizzuddin Shah and Tuanku Zara Salim	Sultan and Raja Permaisuri of Perak
Perlis	Tuanku Syed Faizuddin Putra Jamalullail and Tuanku Lailatul Shahreen Akashah	Raja Muda and Raja Puan Muda of Perlis
Sabah	Tan Sri Datuk Seri Panglima Haji Musa bin Haji Aman	Chief Minister of Sabah
Sarawak	Tun Pehin Sri Haji Abdul Taib bin Mahmud	Yang Di Pertua Negeri of Sarawak
Selangor	Sultan Sharafuddin Idris Shah and Tengku Permaisuri Norashikin Binti Abdul Rahman	Sultan and Tengku Permaisuri of Selangor
Terengganu	Al-Wathiqu Billah Sultan Mizan Zainal Abidin and Sultanah Nur Zahirah	Sultan and Sultanah of Terengganu

=== Heads of government ===
Country	Name	Title
Cambodia	Samdech Hun Sen	Prime Minister of Cambodia
Indonesia	Joko Widodo and his wife, Iriana	President and First Lady of Indonesia
Malaysia	Najib Razak	Prime Minister of Malaysia
Myanmar	Aung San Suu Kyi	State Counsellor of Myanmar
Philippines	Rodrigo Duterte	President of the Philippines
Singapore	Lee Hsien Loong and his wife, Ho Ching	Prime Minister of Singapore
Thailand	General Prayut Chan-o-cha	Prime Minister of the Kingdom of Thailand

=== Royal representatives ===
Country	Name	Position
United Kingdom	Prince Edward, Earl of Wessex and Sophie, Countess of Wessex	Representatives of Queen Elizabeth II of the United Kingdom
Jordan	Prince Hashim bin Hussein	Representative of King Abdullah II of Jordan
United Arab Emirates	Rashid Ahmad Muhammad Bin Fahad	United Arab Emirates's Minister of State

== Monuments and souvenirs ==
In conjunction of the Sultan's Golden Jubilee celebration, Brunei government and also private bodies through the Golden Jubilee Memorial Souvenir Sectorial Committee produce and sell commemorative merchandise and souvenirs to the public. Major broadcasting bodies also publish and sell photographs of the ceremonies.

The Brunei Information Department Department was given the rights to provide photographs and any informations needed about the Golden Jubilee for the use of local and foreign journalists and also to individuals. Government newspapers such as the Pelita Brunei and local media such as Media Permata and Borneo Bulletin made their special commemorative publications.

== See also ==
- Hassanal Bolkiah
- Brunei
- List of sultans of Brunei
