= Bandar Seri Begawan =

Capital and largest city of Brunei

Bandar Seri Begawan بندر سري بڬاوان (Jawi)
- Capital city

Other transcription(s)
  - Mandarin: 斯里巴加湾市; Sīlǐbājiāwānshì (Hanyu Pinyin)
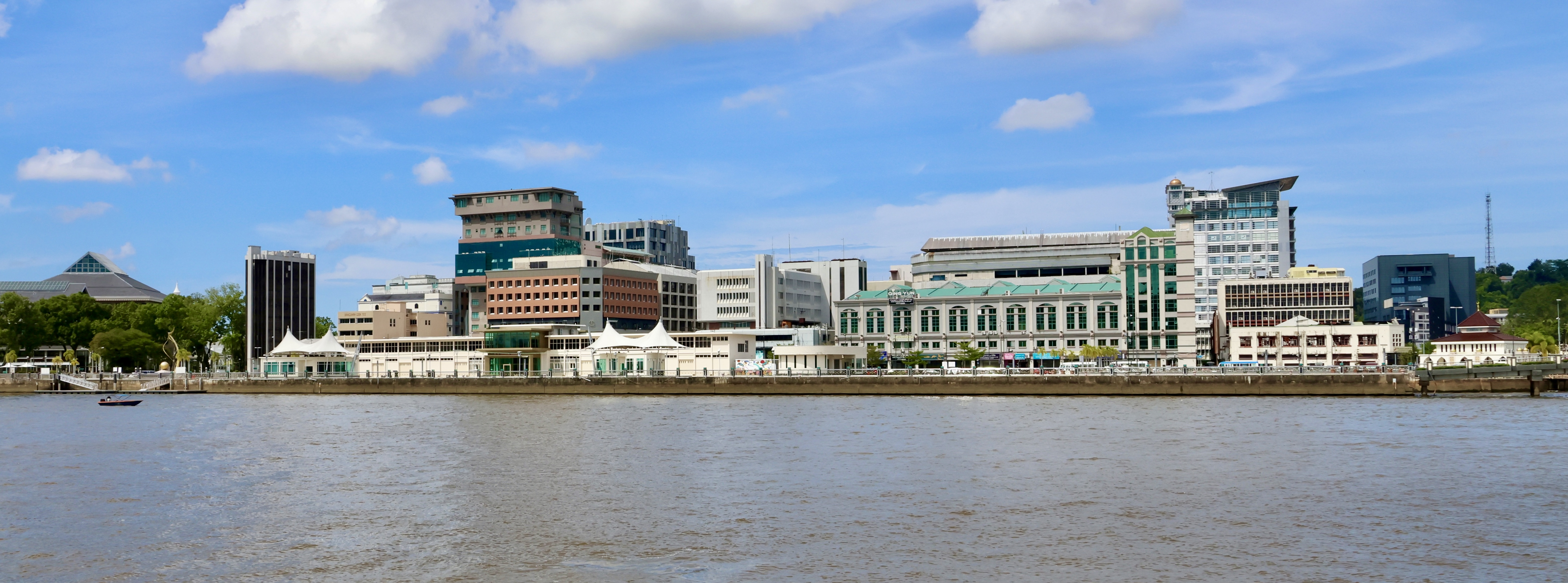
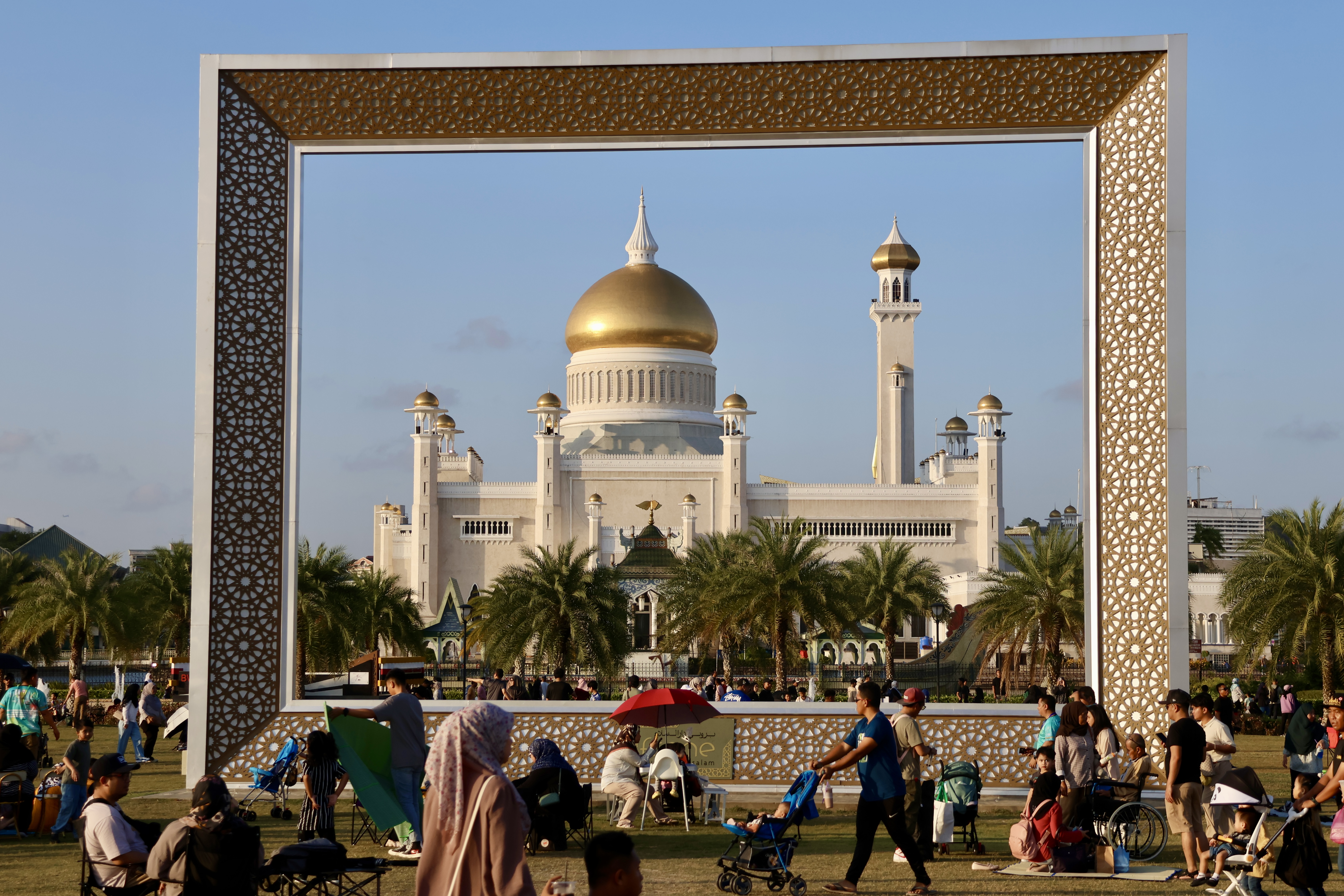
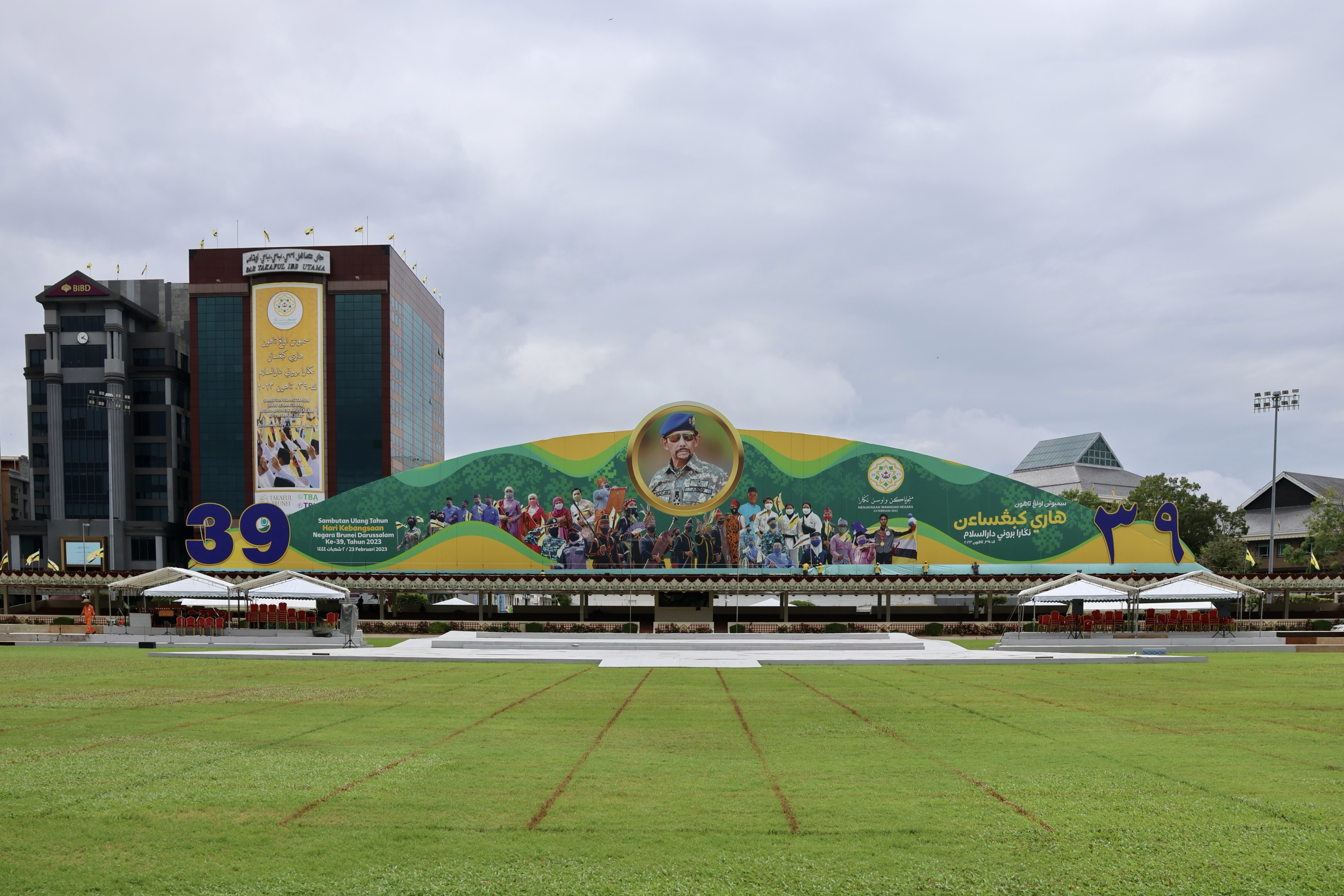
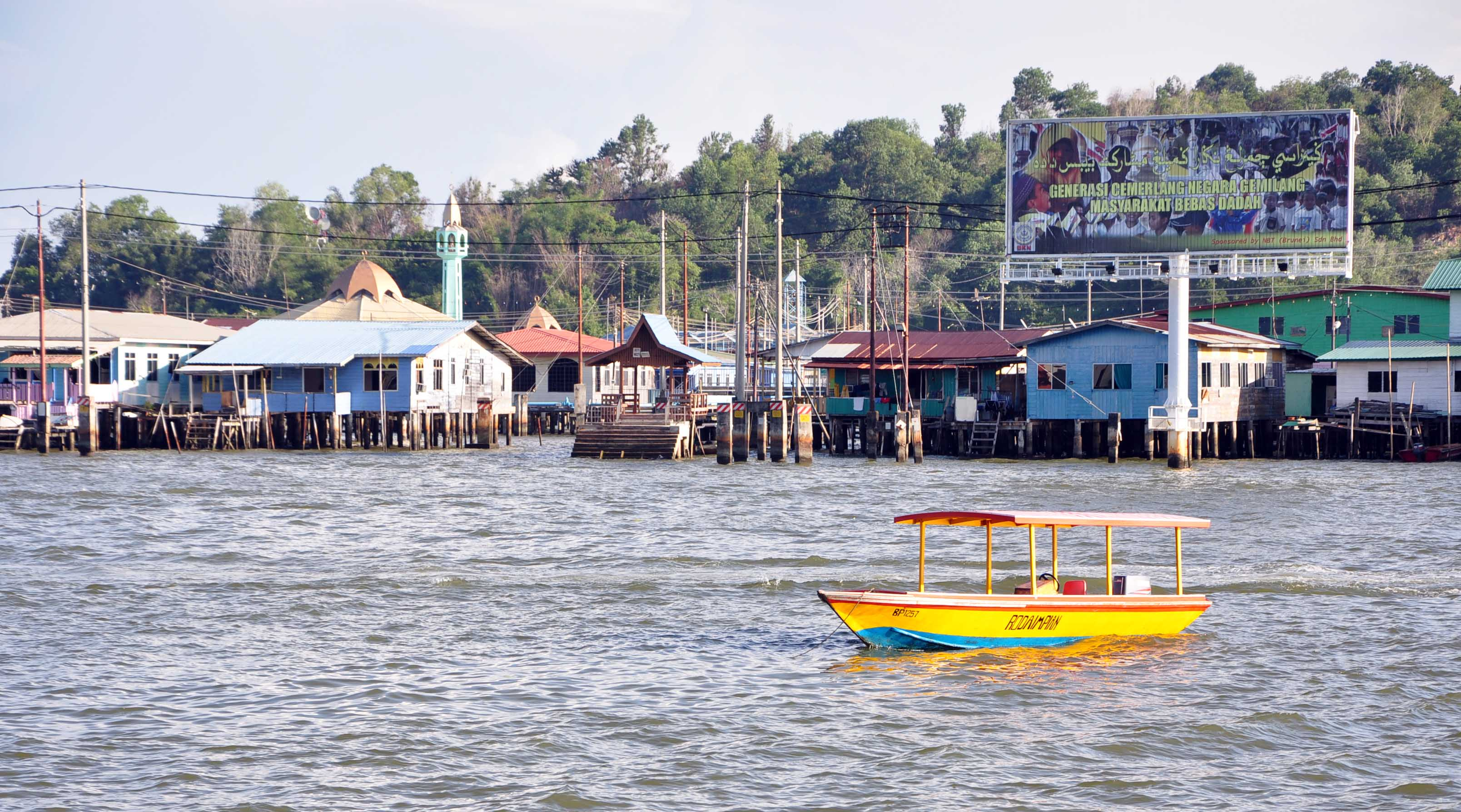
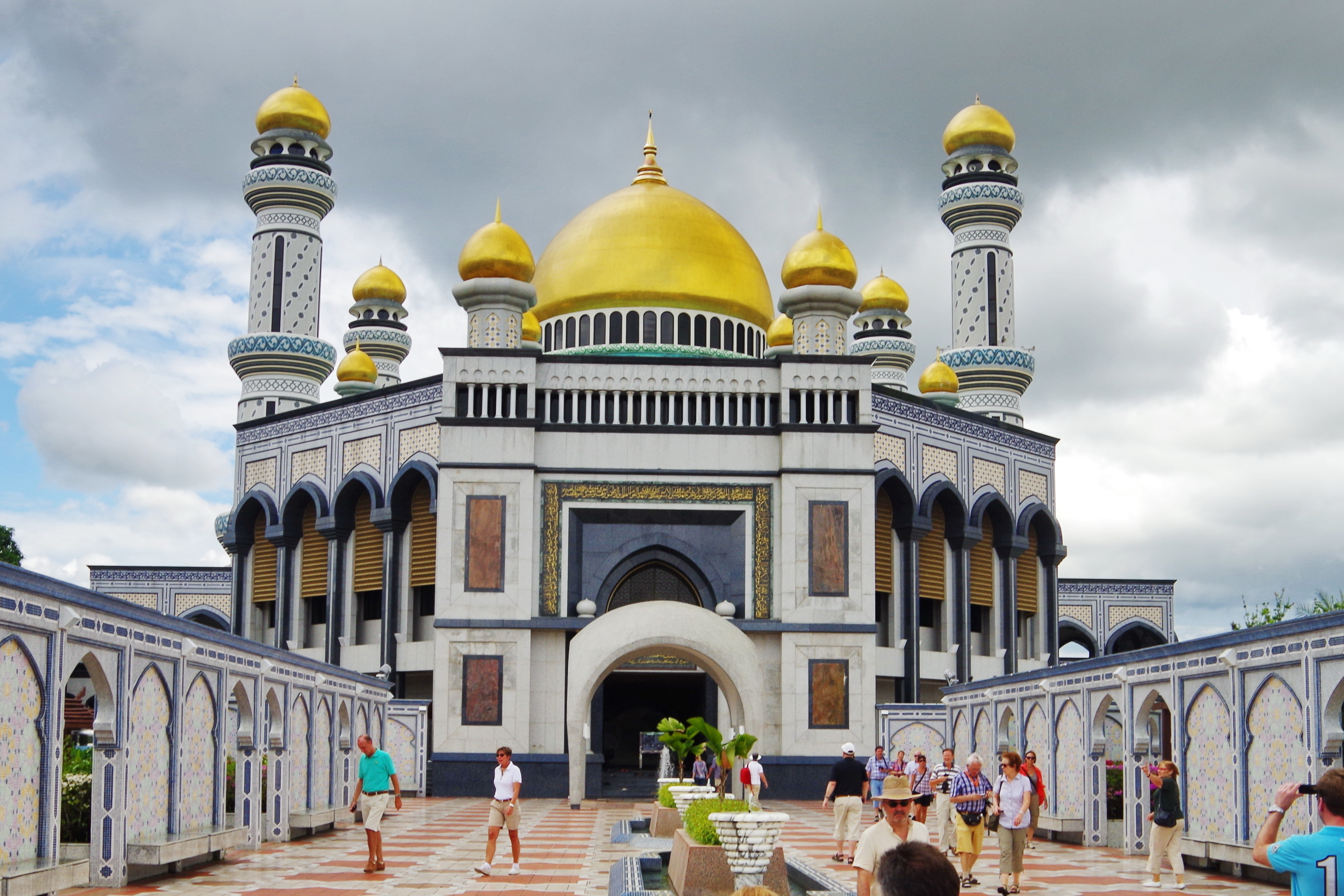
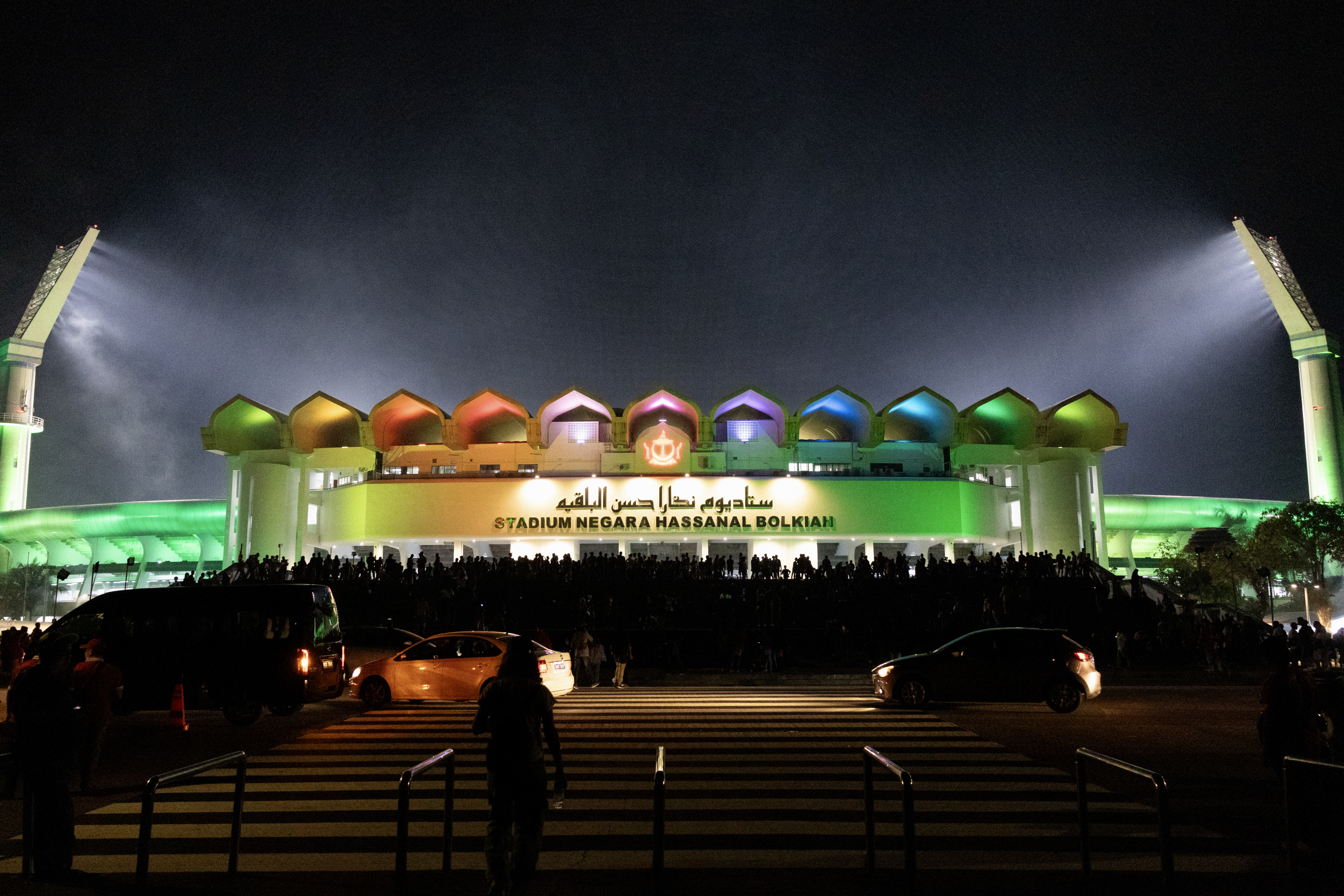
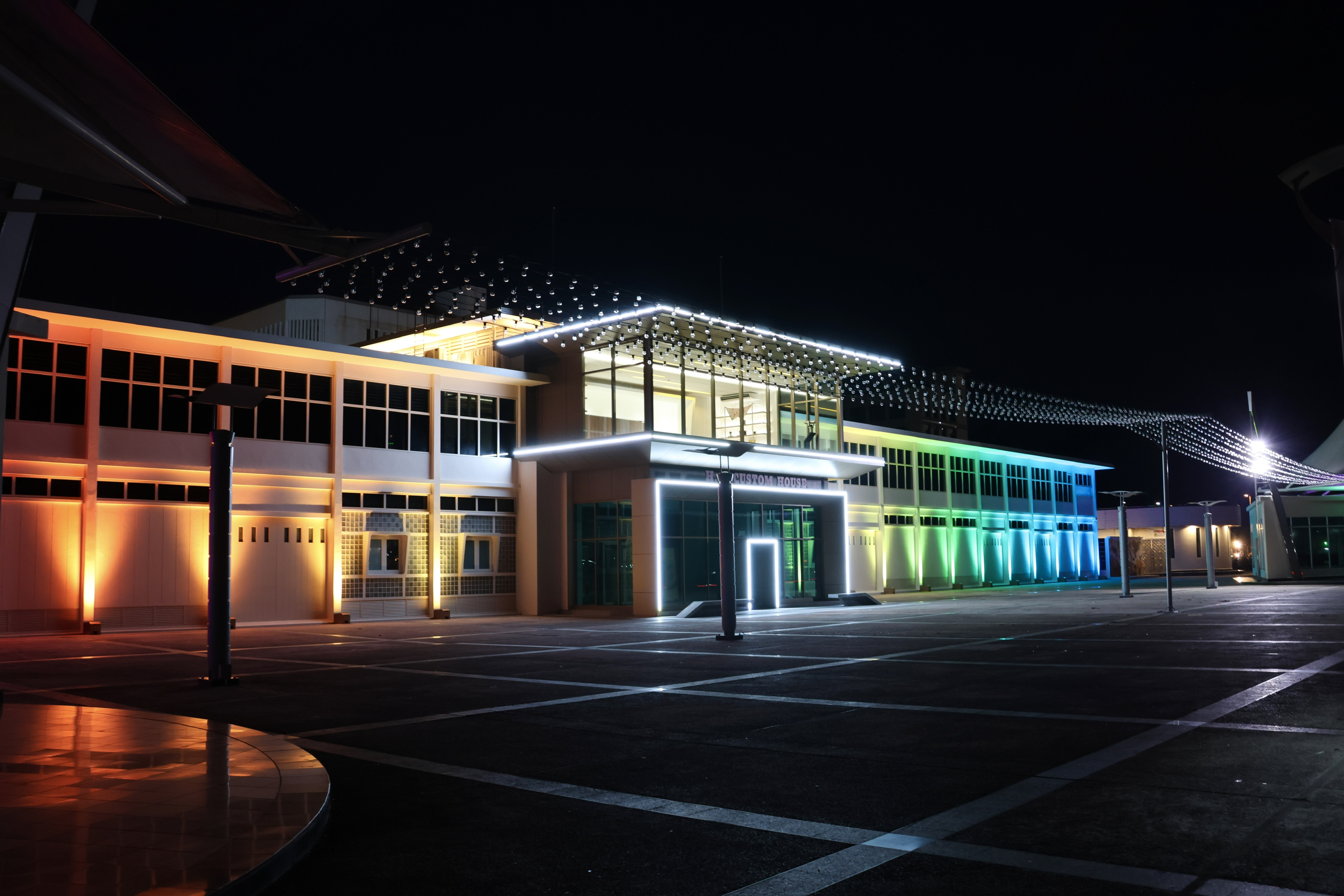
- Skyline of the city centre Omar Ali Saifuddien Mosque Taman Haji Sir Muda Omar 'Ali Saifuddien Kampong Ayer Jame' Asr Hassanil Bolkiah Mosque Hassanal Bolkiah National Stadium Brunei Energy Hub
- Nicknames: The Venice of the East
- Interactive map of Bandar Seri Begawan
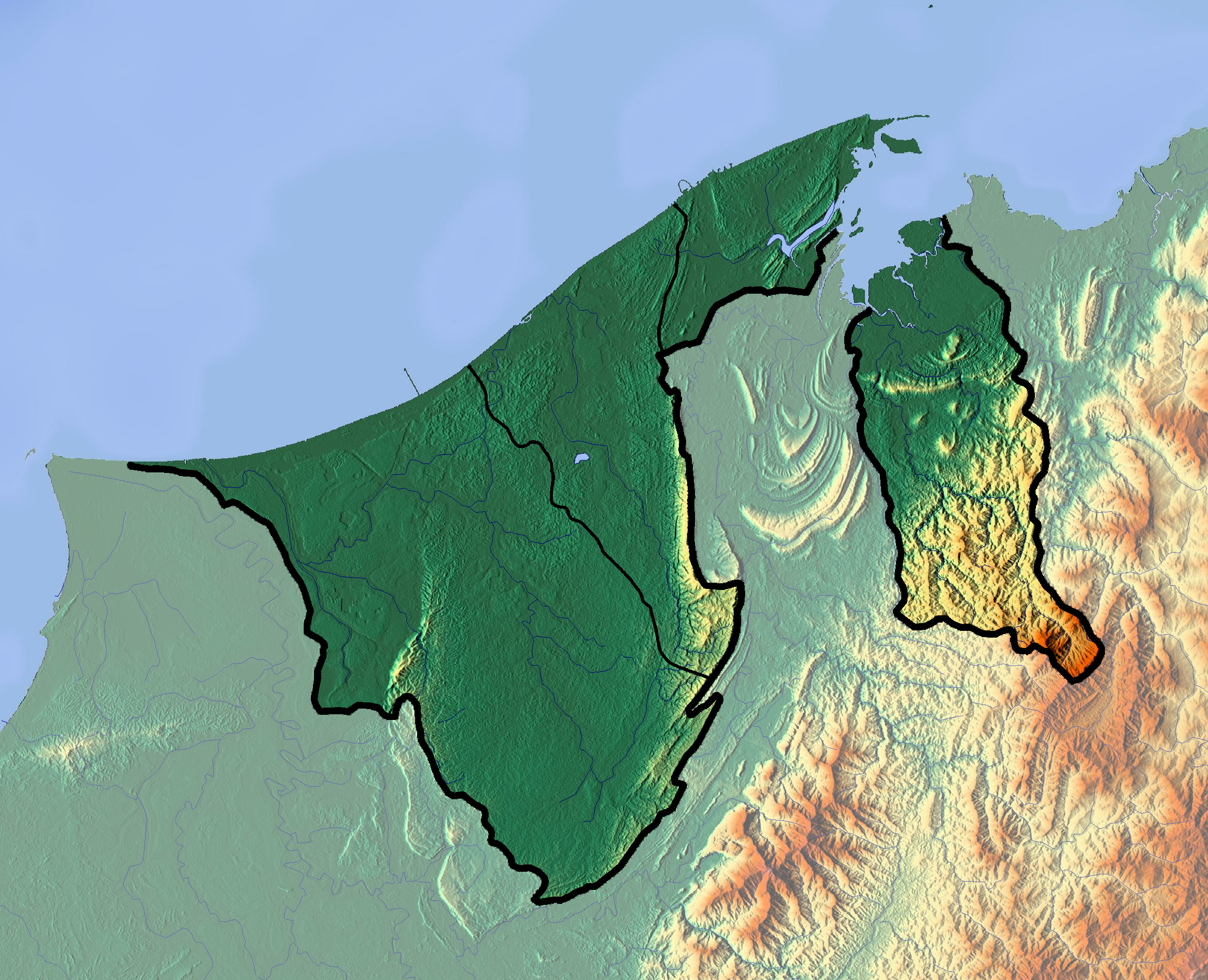
- Location within Brunei Location within Asia
- Coordinates: 4°53′25″N 114°56′32″E
- Country: Brunei
- District: Brunei–Muara
- Settled: 1906
- Administrative centre: 1909
- Municipality: 1 January 1921
- Renamed Bandar Seri Begawan: 4 October 1970

Government
  - Body: Bandar Seri Begawan Municipal Board

Area
  - Capital city: 100.36 km^{2} (38.75 sq mi)

Population (2025)
  - Capital city: 72,133
  - Density: 1,003.39/km^{2} (2,598.8/sq mi)
  - Metro: 318,530
- Time zone: UTC+8 (BNT)
- Area code: +673 2
- Website: bandaran-bsb.gov.bn

Bandar Seri Begawan (Note: BAHN-dahr sə-REE Bə-GAH-wahn; Jawi: بندر سري بڬاوان; Malay: [ˌbandar səˌri bəˈɡawan]) (BSB) is the capital and largest city of Brunei. It is officially a municipal area (kawasan bandaran) with an area of 100.36 square kilometres (38.75 sq mi) and has a population of 72,133 as of 2025 estimate. It is part of Brunei–Muara District, the smallest yet most populous district which is home to over 70 percent of the country's population. It is the country's largest urban centre and nominally the country's only city. The capital is home to Brunei's seat of government, as well as a commercial and cultural centre. It was formerly known as Brunei Town until it was renamed in 1970 in honour of Omar Ali Saifuddien III, the 28th Sultan of Brunei and the father of Sultan Hassanal Bolkiah.

The history of Bandar Seri Begawan can be traced back to the establishment of a Malay stilt settlement on the waters of the Brunei River which became the predecessor of Kampong Ayer today. It became the capital of the Bruneian Sultanate from the 16th century onwards, as well as in the 19th century when it became a British protectorate. The establishment of a British Residency in the 20th century saw the establishment of modern-day administration on land, as well as the gradual resettlement of the riverine dwellers to the land. During World War II, the capital was occupied by the Japanese forces from 1941 and bombed in 1945 upon liberation by Allied forces. Brunei's independence from the British was declared on 1 January 1984 on a square in the city centre.

Bandar Seri Begawan is home to Istana Nurul Iman, the largest residential palace in the world by the Guinness World Records, and Omar Ali Saifuddien Mosque, Brunei's iconic landmark. It is also home to Kampong Ayer, the largest 'water village' in the world and nicknamed Venice of the East. It was the host city of the 20th Southeast Asian Games in 1999 and 8th APEC Summit in 2000.

== Etymology ==
Bandar Seri Begawan was named after the title of the 28th Sultan of Brunei Omar Ali Saifuddien III, Seri Begawan (from Sanskrit: श्री भगवान्, romanized: Śrī Bhagavān, 'the shining and saintly') bestowed upon his abdication in favor of his son, Hassanal Bolkiah, in 1967. The city was renamed on 4 October 1970 to commemorate his contribution to the modernisation of the country during his reign in the 20th century. Prior to this, the city had been known as Brunei Town or Bandar Brunei in Malay.

== History ==
=== Early history ===
The growth and development of Brunei's historic capital city unfolded in three main stages. The first stage began in the 17th century with the emergence of a water settlement near present-day Kota Batu. In the second stage the capital shifted to the area around what is now Kampong Ayer—a collection of water villages. Today, Kampong Ayer, originally the ancient capital built over the Brunei River, serves as a suburb of the modern capital on adjacent land, having thrived particularly during Sultan Bolkiah's reign. This city was developed on land during the third phase, particularly after 1906.

Over 300 years of intermittent conflict between the Malay Muslim tribes and Spanish conquistadors, known in Spanish chronicles as the Moro Wars, began in 1578 when Catholic Spaniards attacked Kampong Ayer during the Castilian War. Pirates, many of whom were Muslim sailors from the southern Philippines and Borneo, including destitute princes from the royal families of Sulu and Brunei, took advantage of the void left by Kampong Ayer's loss in authority throughout the 16th and 17th century. Along with other important sites like Endau and Jolo, the capital became a major hub for piracy and the trade in stolen goods and slaves as the sultan attempted to regulate or tax these pirate towns.

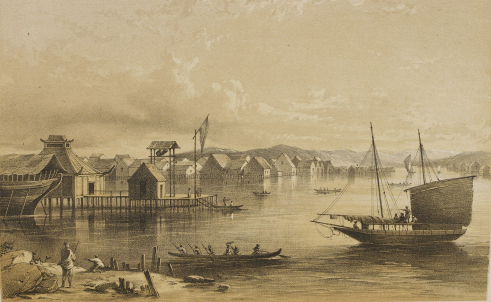
An illustration of Kampong Ayer's stilt houses on the Brunei River in 1844

Kampong Ayer was still humble and less affluent by the middle of the 19th century, and its look had not altered much since Antonio Pigafetta's time. It was dubbed a "Venice of hovels" by Rajah James Brooke in 1841. Houses were constructed on mudflats, encircled by mud at low tide and water at high tide, and a floating market was crowded with people peddling things from canoes. Despite its unattractive appearance, the town was renowned for its packed buildings and the spacious but uncomfortable palace, where Brooke was made to feel quite welcome by the sultan and his court despite the gloomy and basic lodgings.

Known as the "Venice of Borneo", Kampong Ayer is distinguished by its position on a wide river that empties into a sizeable lake and by the fact that its homes are perched on piles that are around 10 feet (3.0 m) above the tide. The formerly thriving town has lost both size and significance, as seen by its dilapidated buildings and shortage of defences. Once enclosed by a sturdy brick wall and furnished with opulent furnishings, the sultan's palace looks like a cheap shed. The town's filthy state is exacerbated by offensive smells coming from uncovered mud, where waste builds up. In sharp contrast to the town's historical splendour, the majority of the population is made up of slaves and the Sultan's and nobility's dependents.

=== Colonial era ===
Brunei Town's development unfolded in three major phases, with the third beginning in 1906 under Malcolm McArthur's guidance, focusing on transitioning the settlement to land. His vision aimed to address the sanitation issues that were most severe in Kampong Ayer, a water village with 8,000–10,000 residents when the Residential system was introduced. McArthur prioritised constructing a land-based colony, starting with his own residence, Bubungan Dua Belas, even though the sultan's palace remained in Kampong Ayer. By 1910, Chinese immigrants had opened shops, further establishing the colony on land.

In 1911 the water village, largely populated by Malay Muslim and a small Kedayan community in nearby areas, was home to many houses built over water. The capital endured severe hardship after losing Limbang, which had provided essential resources to river villagers; this loss also undermined Sultan Hashim Jalilul Alam Aqamaddin's prestige and authority amid growing economic challenges. In 1920, the area was officially designated as Brunei's capital and municipal territory. Along the western riverbanks, government buildings and a mosque were constructed in the same year. Later on 1 January 1921, the Brunei Town Sanitary Board (BTSB) was established to oversee its development. In 1922, Sultan Muhammad Jamalul Alam II's decision to relocate his palace from Kampung Sultan Lama to the interior of Brunei Town (Note: Istana Majlis, the new land-based palace of Jamalul Alam, was finished in 1921.) renewed interest in Resident McArthur's proposal for relocating the Kampong Ayer community. His involvement inspired Kampong Ayer residents to consider mainland resettlement, and relocation efforts in the 1920s began expanding beyond the city centre to areas like Tungkadeh and Kumbang Pasang, marking a significant shift in Brunei's urban development.

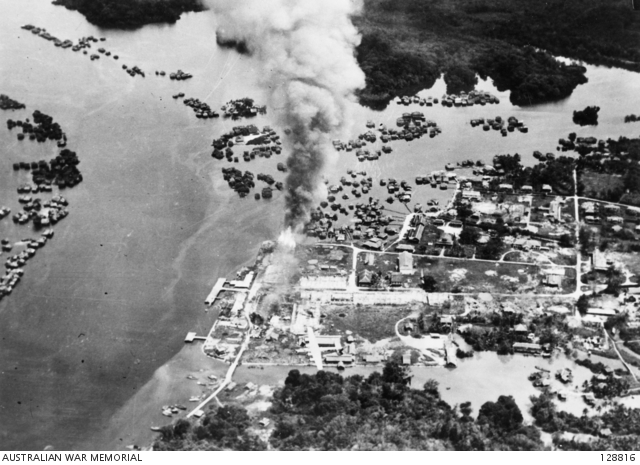
Aerial photograph of Brunei Town under Allied bombing in 1945

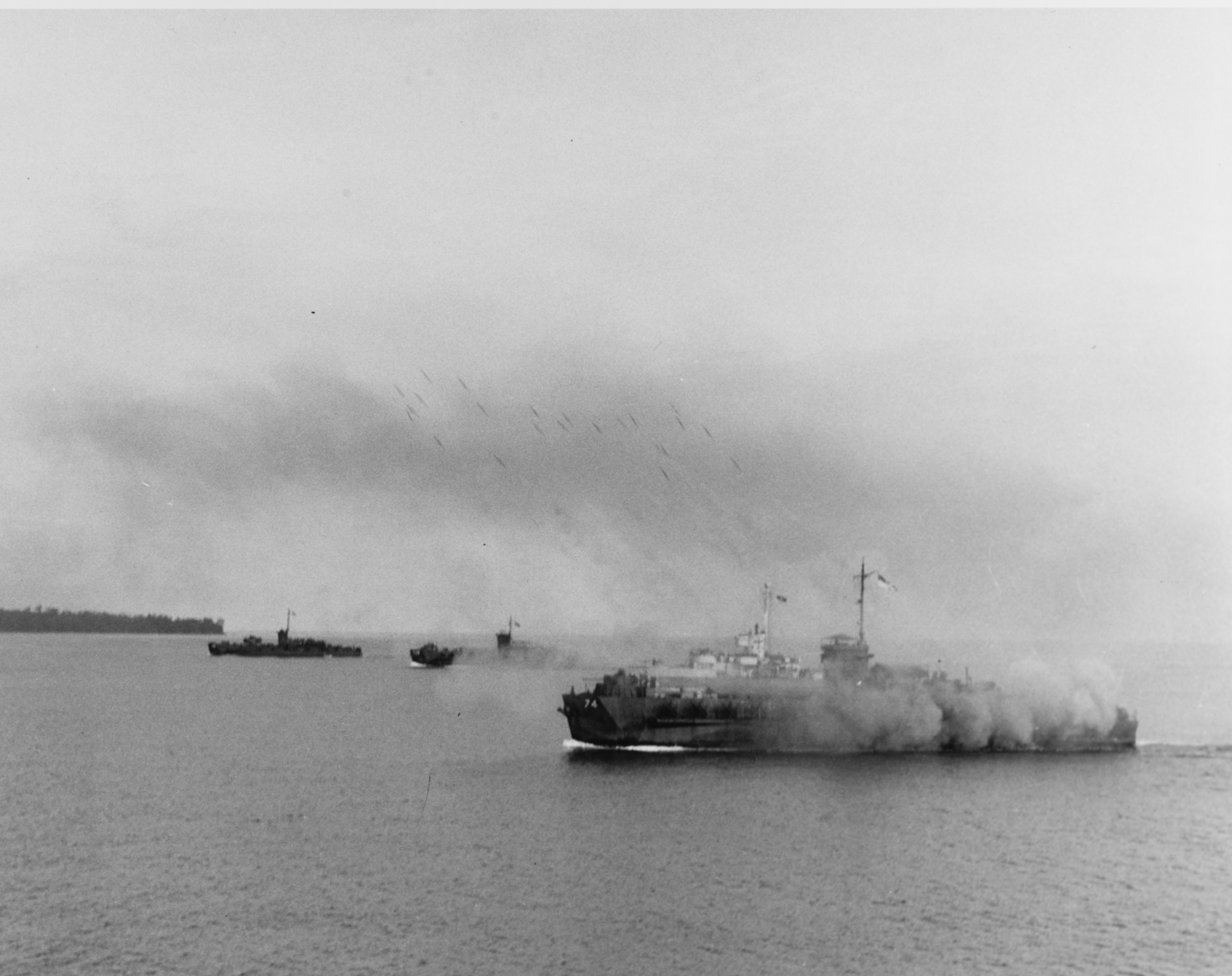
Naval bombardment prior to the Allied landings at Muara Beach

On 22 December 1941, Brunei Town was overrun by the Japanese, who had launched an assault starting in Kuala Belait. To British officers they had seized, the Japanese declared their intention to free Asia from colonial rule. Due to an Allied embargo that hampered the local economy, Brunei Town experienced extreme economic duress during the Japanese occupation. On 22 December 1941, Sultan Ahmad Tajuddin, who was based in Kampong Sumbiling, surrendered to General Tawaguchi. By encouraging agriculture and requiring farmers to turn over a percentage of their harvests, Japan sought to integrate Brunei's culture and economy with its own, appointing Ibrahim Mohammad Jahfar as head of administration under Governor Takamura. The Japanese instituted stringent cultural initiatives, such as teaching Japanese language and values and establishing youth groups like the Brunei Malay Organisation, in an effort to exploit the oil riches. The town was brutally bombarded by Allied forces beginning in November 1944 and subjected to extreme brutality by the Japanese military police, the Kempeitai.

After three days of warfare, American and Australian forces captured Brunei on 10 June 1945, but Brunei Town suffered significant damage. Brunei Malays had a stronger sense of national identity at this time, and local partners went on to play important roles in the burgeoning nationalist movement. The town's wartime population of 16,000 was reduced to a small number of people who remained when the war came to a close due to Allied bombs and food shortages. Residents were forced to observe from neighboring hills or take cover in the bush after the bombers destroyed almost all of the town's homes and businesses. Bruneians started reconstructing their homes out of the debris left by the bombs after the Japanese withdrew into the forest in June 1945.

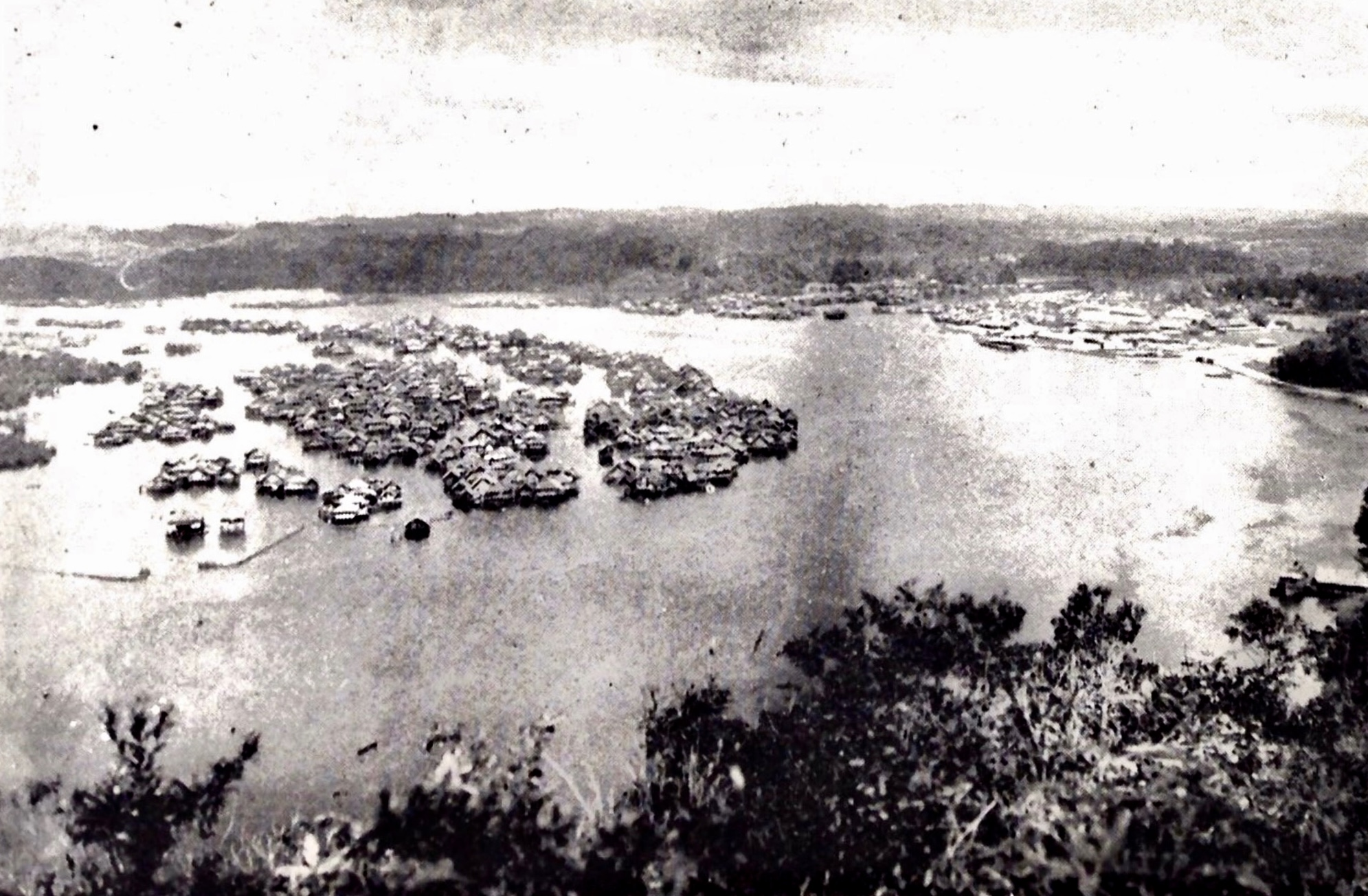
Brunei Town (right) in 1947

The town became a focal point for important institutional and religious transformation following the war. To further Islamic matters, a board of 19 notable individuals and not all of them were religious experts, was formed in 1948. To increase the sultan's legitimacy in the face of British scrutiny, this reform sought to standardise religious courts, codify Islamic law, and enhance the management of Islamic services under his direct control. Despite having little contact with Brunei's western regions, new groups like the Organisation of Islamic Cooperation contributed to the region's religious life in the 1950s, which witnessed a considerable increase in religious activity in the town. Despite the oil industry's fast growth in urban areas like Seria and Kuala Belait, no clear regional religious identity was able to emerge because of the close institutional ties between Brunei Town's religious establishment and the surrounding districts.

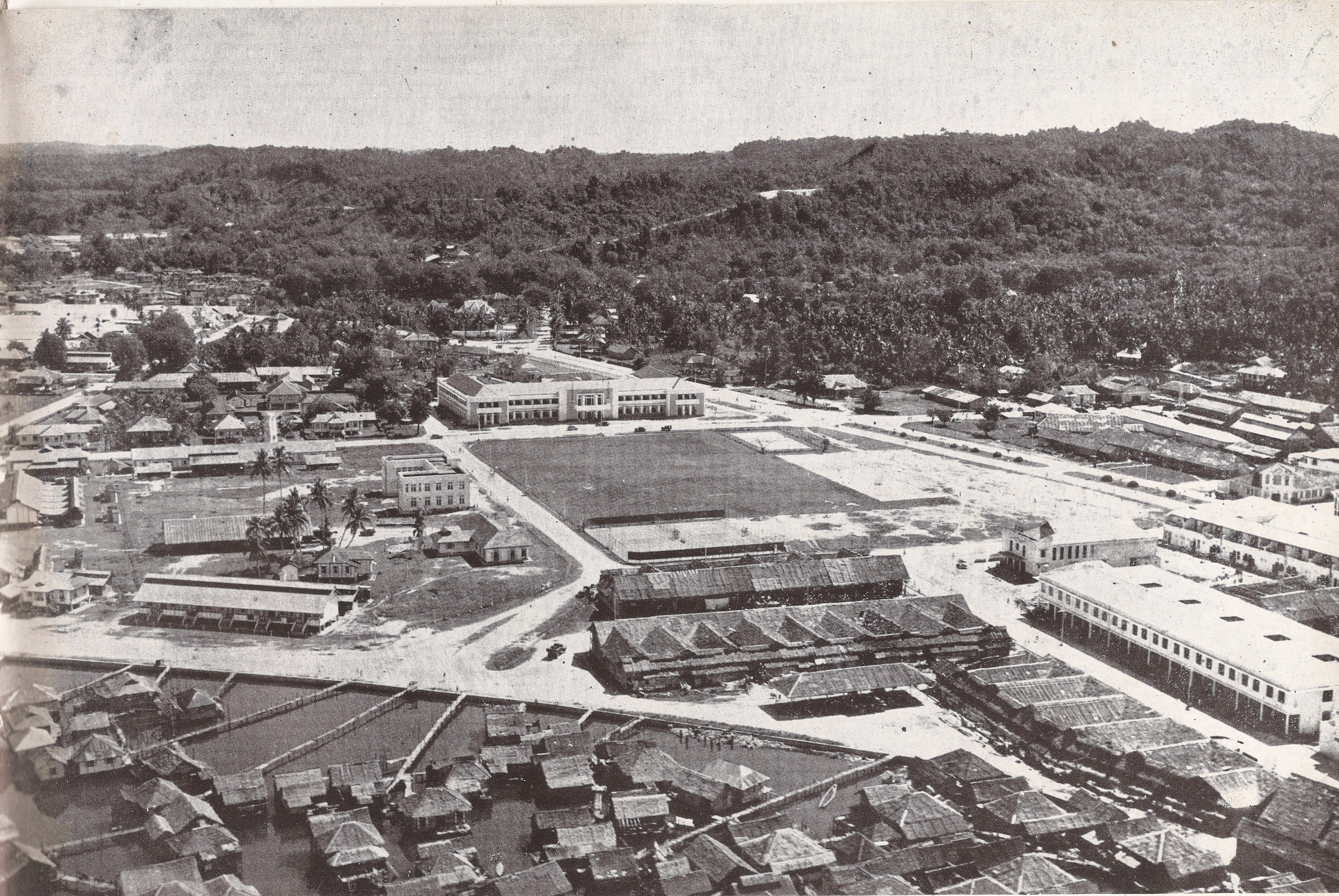
Brunei Town's city centre in 1950

In the post-war period, particularly throughout the 1950s and 1960s, Brunei focused on social and religious growth as well as urban reconstruction. Years of occupation during the Pacific War had left the city's infrastructure severely damaged, necessitating quick solutions like the rapid reconstruction of Brunei Town's stores and the temporary thatched-roof rebuild of Masjid Kajang. In 1953, the town saw significant investment through a five-year National Development Plan funded with M$100 million, primarily for infrastructure, following Sultan Omar Ali Saifuddien III's successful negotiation with the British for increased corporate taxes and expanded war reparations. In 1953, a major development plan was introduced, dedicating $100 million to the city's growth—a significant investment for a community of just 54,000. That same year on 1 August, the BTSB was renamed the Brunei Town Municipal Board (BTMB) and administered by the British Resident until 1959. From then on, the Brunei–Muara District Officer took on dual roles as head and chairman of the BTMB.

Brunei's population tripled to 83,877 by 1960 as a result of immigration brought on by oilfield finds in Belait. The capital was now competing economically with the burgeoning cities of Seria and Kuala Belait. Although the majority did not hold Bruneian citizenship, the Chinese community, who were extensively involved in local commerce, increased to a quarter of the population by 1960. The Brunei revolt began on 8 December 1962, when the North Kalimantan National Army quickly captured Brunei Town, the oilfields at Seria, and portions of Sarawak and North Borneo. In response, British forces, including Gurkhas and Royal Marines, regained control of most key centres by 11 December, resulting in the capture or surrender of around 2,700.

=== Independence era ===
Together with the expansion of the oil and gas industry, commercialisation began to transform Brunei's capital and a large number of public buildings were constructed, along with the development of a central business district in the 1970s and 1980s. Brunei Town was formally renamed Bandar Seri Begawan on 4 October 1970, in honour of the retired Sultan Omar Ali Saifuddien III, with the renaming ceremony held at the capital. On 1 January 1984, at midnight, Sultan Hassanal Bolkiah declared Brunei's independence at the Taman Haji Sir Muda Omar 'Ali Saifuddien. The Ministry of Home Affairs has been in charge of the Bandar Seri Begawan Municipal Board since the country's independence in 1984. The new town has grown along Jalan Berakas and Jalan Muara in the north and Jalan Tutong and Jalan Gadong in the west. A 1998 Asia Week study ranked Bandar Seri Begawan among Asia's top capital cities for 1999 and 2000, highlighting its cleanliness and security as key factors in its recognition.

On 1 August 2007, Sultan Hassanal Bolkiah gave consent for the expansion of the city from 12.87 km^{2} (4.97 sq mi) to 100.36 km^{2} (38.75 sq mi).

== Government ==
The city is administered by the Bandar Seri Begawan Municipal Board within Bandar Seri Begawan Municipal Department, a government department within the Ministry of Home Affairs. The Municipal Board was established in 1921, originally as a Sanitary Board (Lembaga Kebersihan) which was, and is still, responsible for maintaining the cleanliness to the then Brunei Town. It achieved the status of bandaran (municipality) in 1935 with the conversion of the Sanitary Board into the current Municipal Board (Lembaga Bandaran).

The city is in the Brunei–Muara District, the smallest yet the most populous district in the country, and as of 1 August 2007, the municipal area has been expanded from 12.87 square kilometres (4.97 sq mi) to 100.36 square kilometres (38.75 sq mi). The Bandar Seri Begawan area encompasses several mukims and villages within the district, including Mukim Berakas 'A', Mukim Berakas 'B', Mukim Burong Pingai Ayer, Mukim Gadong 'A', Mukim Gadong 'B', Mukim Kianggeh, Mukim Kilanas, Mukim Kota Batu, Mukim Peramu, Mukim Saba, Mukim Sungai Kebun, Mukim Sungai Kedayan, and Mukim Tamoi.

== Geography ==
The Brunei–Muara District, encompassing 563 square kilometres (217 sq mi), is the smallest of Brunei's western districts and is home to Bandar Seri Begawan. The area contrasts sharply with the mountainous Temburong District to the east, featuring low hills, marshy coastal plains, and narrow alluvial valleys along key rivers. Between Tutong and the capital, hills approach the coast, while the coastal plains around Bandar Seri Begawan remain low and marshy, particularly to the south. Brunei's territory is divided by the Limbang region of Sarawak, which historically served as the capital's natural hinterland until its cession to Sarawak in 1890. The city is easily accessible from Bukit Kota, a 133-meter (436 ft) hill near the eastern boundary of Brunei's western area, while TV broadcasts were transmitted from nearby Subok Hill.

The Brunei River, which flows into Brunei Bay, is one of several waterways converging near Bandar Seri Begawan. Key subcatchments—Kedayan River, Sungai Damuan, and Sungai Imang—enter the low-lying, swampy Brunei River basin at various points, with Kedayan River joining close to the city. The area is bordered by ridges and estuarine plains, experiencing significant urban development. The neighboring Tutong and Belait rivers add to the region's complex estuarine and floodplain systems. A strip of thick coal seams runs along the coastline between Bandar Seri Begawan and Muara.

=== Climate ===
Brunei has an equatorial, tropical rainforest climate more subject to the Intertropical Convergence Zone than to the trade winds and rare cyclones. The climate is hot and wet. The city sees heavy precipitation throughout the year, with the northeast monsoon blowing from December to March and the southeast monsoon from around June to October. The wettest day on record is 9 July 2020, when 662.0 millimetres (26.06 in) of rainfall was reported at the airport.

Climate data for Bandar Seri Begawan (Brunei Airport) (1991–2020 normals, extremes 1972–2020)
Month	Jan	Feb	Mar	Apr	May	Jun	Jul	Aug	Sep	Oct	Nov	Dec	Year
Record high °C (°F)	35.5 (95.9)	36.7 (98.1)	38.3 (100.9)	37.6 (99.7)	36.7 (98.1)	36.2 (97.2)	36.2 (97.2)	37.6 (99.7)	36.9 (98.4)	35.4 (95.7)	34.9 (94.8)	36.2 (97.2)	38.3 (100.9)
Mean daily maximum °C (°F)	33.0 (91.4)	33.4 (92.1)	34.3 (93.7)	34.5 (94.1)	34.8 (94.6)	34.5 (94.1)	34.7 (94.5)	35.1 (95.2)	34.6 (94.3)	33.9 (93.0)	33.6 (92.5)	33.5 (92.3)	34.2 (93.5)
Daily mean °C (°F)	27.0 (80.6)	27.2 (81.0)	27.6 (81.7)	28.0 (82.4)	28.1 (82.6)	27.9 (82.2)	27.7 (81.9)	27.8 (82.0)	27.6 (81.7)	27.2 (81.0)	27.2 (81.0)	27.2 (81.0)	27.5 (81.6)
Mean daily minimum °C (°F)	22.1 (71.8)	22.4 (72.3)	22.7 (72.9)	22.8 (73.0)	22.8 (73.0)	22.6 (72.7)	22.4 (72.3)	22.4 (72.3)	22.3 (72.1)	22.3 (72.1)	22.6 (72.7)	22.5 (72.5)	22.5 (72.5)
Record low °C (°F)	18.4 (65.1)	18.9 (66.0)	19.4 (66.9)	20.5 (68.9)	20.3 (68.5)	19.2 (66.6)	19.1 (66.4)	19.4 (66.9)	19.6 (67.3)	20.5 (68.9)	18.8 (65.8)	19.5 (67.1)	18.4 (65.1)
Average precipitation mm (inches)	320.6 (12.62)	162.9 (6.41)	143.4 (5.65)	241.8 (9.52)	260.3 (10.25)	237.7 (9.36)	241.8 (9.52)	231.5 (9.11)	235.1 (9.26)	313.6 (12.35)	322.9 (12.71)	358.9 (14.13)	3,070.5 (120.89)
Average precipitation days (≥ 1.0 mm)	18.0	12.0	13.0	16.0	18.0	17.0	17.0	17.0	18.0	21.0	22.0	22.0	211
Average relative humidity (%)	86	85	84	84	85	84	84	83	84	85	86	86	85
Average dew point °C (°F)	24.5 (76.1)	24.5 (76.1)	24.6 (76.3)	25.0 (77.0)	25.3 (77.5)	24.9 (76.8)	24.7 (76.5)	24.6 (76.3)	24.6 (76.3)	24.5 (76.1)	24.6 (76.3)	24.6 (76.3)	24.7 (76.5)
Mean monthly sunshine hours	214.3	209.1	230.0	239.2	239.1	216.5	223.8	225.4	197.2	211.1	216.6	204.2	2,626.5
Source 1: World Meteorological Organisation,
Source 2: Deutscher Wetterdienst (extremes, 1971–2012 and humidity, 1972–1990)

== Demographics ==
The Bruneian Census 2011 Report estimated the population of Bandar Seri Begawan to be approximately 20,000, while the metropolitan area had around 279,924. The majority of Bruneians are Malays, with Chinese being the most significant minority group. Aboriginal groups such as the Bisaya, Belait, Dusun, Kedayan, Lun Bawang, Murut, and Tutong also exist. They are classified as part of the Malay ethnic groups and have been given the Bumiputera privileges. Large numbers of foreign workers are also found within Brunei and the capital city, with the majority being from Malaysia, Thailand, the Philippines, Indonesia (mostly Betawi, Batak, Ambon, Minahasa, Aceh, Malay and Minangkabau), and the Indian subcontinent.

== Main sights and tourism ==
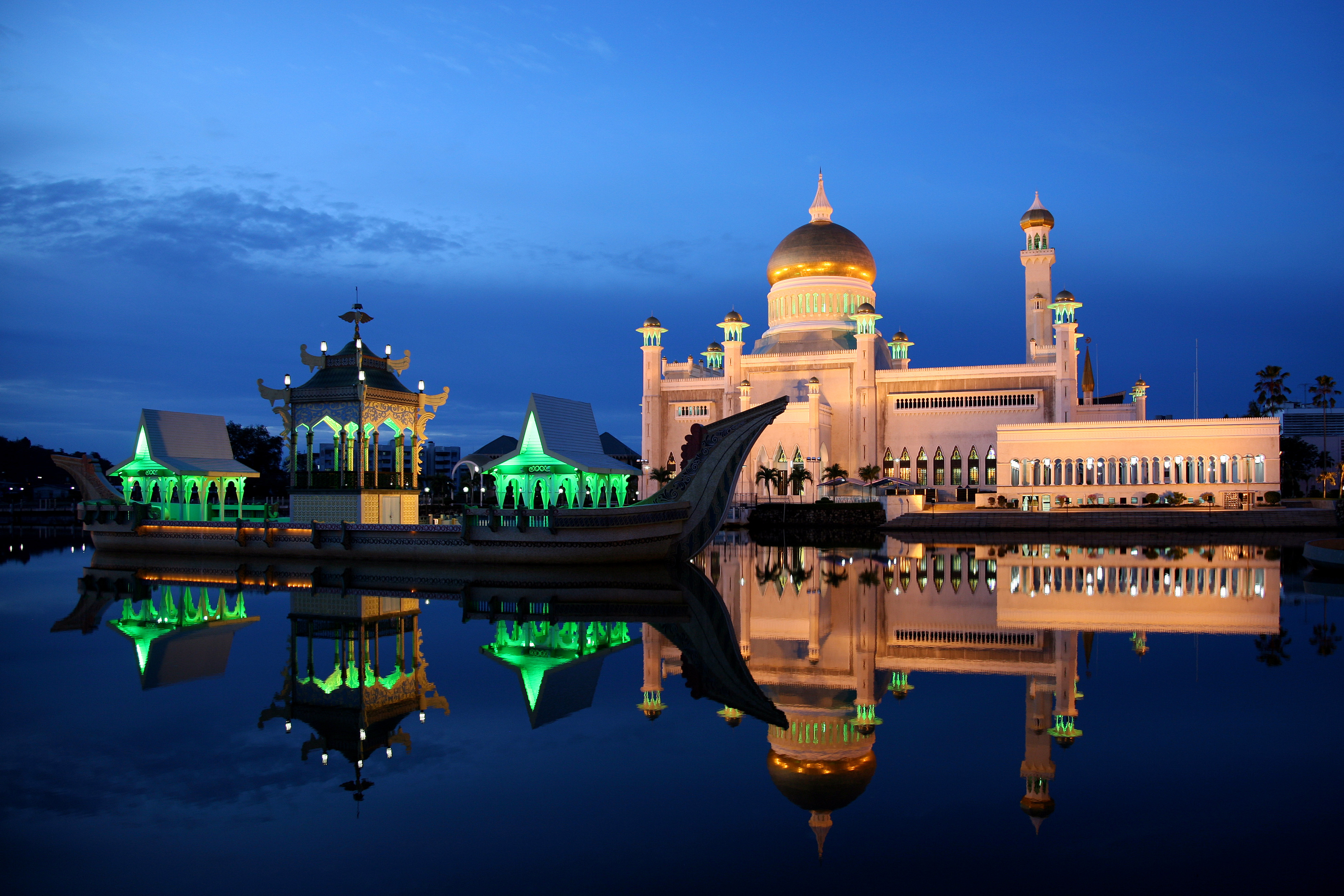
Omar Ali Saifuddien Mosque

Numerous important historical and religious sites may be found in Bandar Seri Begawan. The Ash-Shaliheen Mosque, Jame' Asr Hassanil Bolkiah Mosque, and Omar Ali Saifuddien Mosque are notable mosques. Another noteworthy house of worship is the Pro-Cathedral of Our Lady of the Assumption. The tombs of Bolkiah and Sharif Ali in Kota Batu are key historical attractions, symbolising Brunei's rich legacy. The Lapau, traditionally used for royal ceremonies, and the Old Lapau, now a gallery in the Brunei History Centre, add to the city's cultural significance. The city also hosts several museums. The Brunei Museum, situated in the Kota Batu Archaeological Park, is the country's largest archaeological site. Other notable museums include the Brunei Darussalam Maritime Museum, Brunei Energy Hub, Kampong Ayer Cultural and Tourism Gallery, Malay Technology Museum, Royal Regalia Museum, and Bubungan Dua Belas.

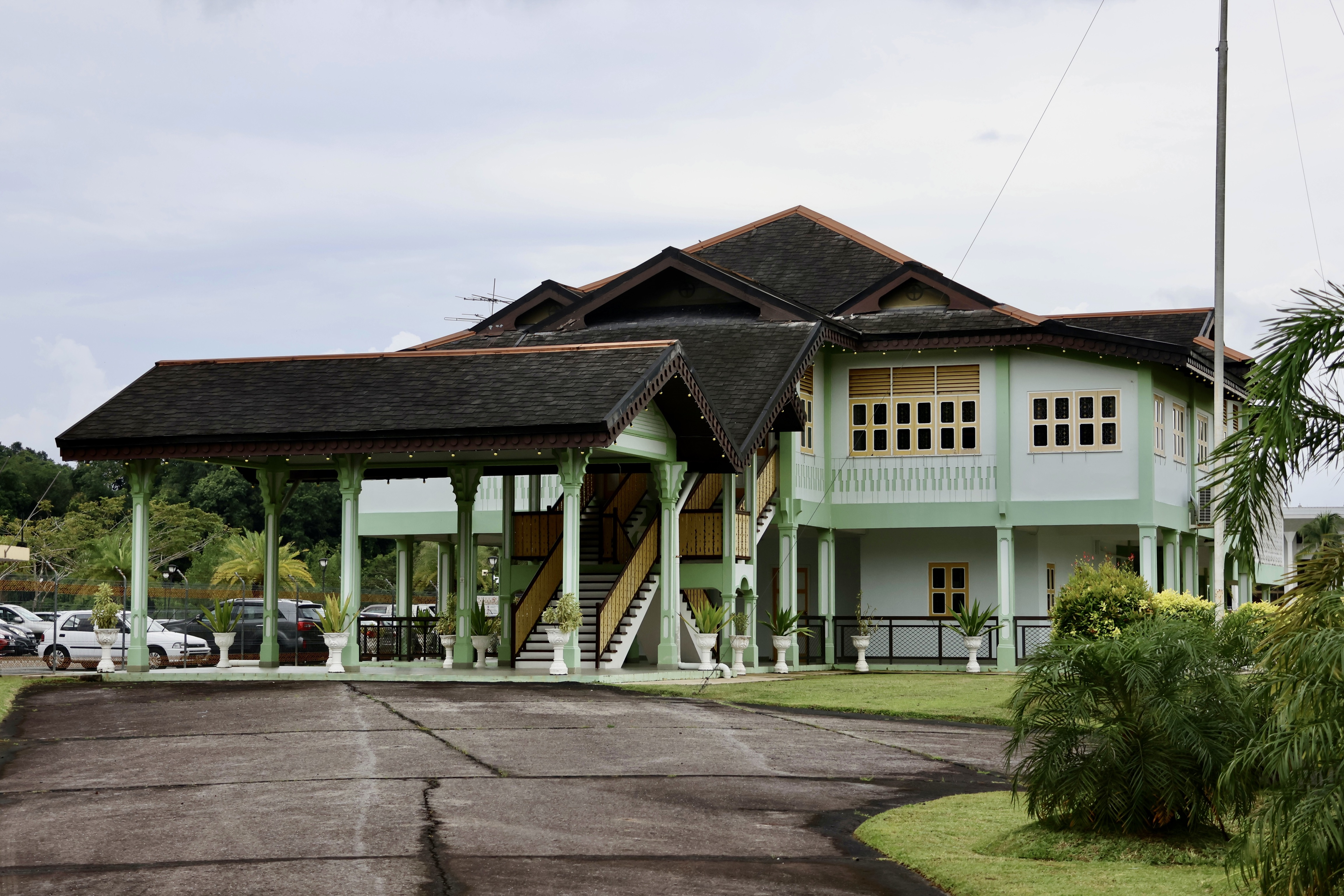
Istana Darussalam

Istana Darussalam and Istana Darul Hana are former royal residences of Sultan Omar Ali Saifuddien III, while the Istana Nurul Iman palace currently serves as the residence of Sultan Hassanal Bolkiah. The Secretariat Building, the oldest government structure, holds the seat of government known as "State Secretary." The Raja Ayang Mausoleum, dating back to the 15th century, is believed to honor a royal who was punished for incest, and it has since become a cultural site where visitors often seek blessings, despite some damage caused by offerings. Royal Mausoleum is the main burial ground for several sultans and royal family members of Brunei, adding to the country's historical significance.

The city's suburb incorporates nearby Kampong Ayer, in which houses were built on stilts. It stretches about 8 km (5.0 mi) along the Brunei River. Founded 1,000 years ago, the village is considered the largest stilt settlement in the world, with approximately 30,000 residents and 2,000 houses. The term "Venice of the East" was coined by Pigafetta in honour of the water village that he encountered at Kota Batu. Pigafetta was on Ferdinand Magellan's last voyages when he visited Brunei in 1521.

Several parks and trails in the city serve as landmarks of historical and cultural significance. Taman Haji Sir Muda Omar 'Ali Saifuddien, for example, was where Brunei's declaration of independence was read on 1 January 1984. Taman Mahkota Jubli Emas, inaugurated on 22 October 2017, commemorates the Golden Jubilee of Sultan Hassanal Bolkiah's rule, while the Sultan Haji Hassanal Bolkiah Silver Jubilee Park, opened in 2004, celebrates the Silver Jubilee of his reign. Tasek Lama Recreational Park is one of the oldest recognised parks in the country. Additionally, Pusat Belia, Brunei's youth centre, was established on 20 December 1969 after being commissioned by then-Crown Prince Hassanal Bolkiah in 1967. The centre, costing B$2 million, includes extensive facilities such as a hall for 1,000 people, a gymnastics hall, an Olympic-sized pool, and a gender-separated hostel, and it celebrated its golden jubilee in 2020.

== Transportation ==
The main bus station in 2009

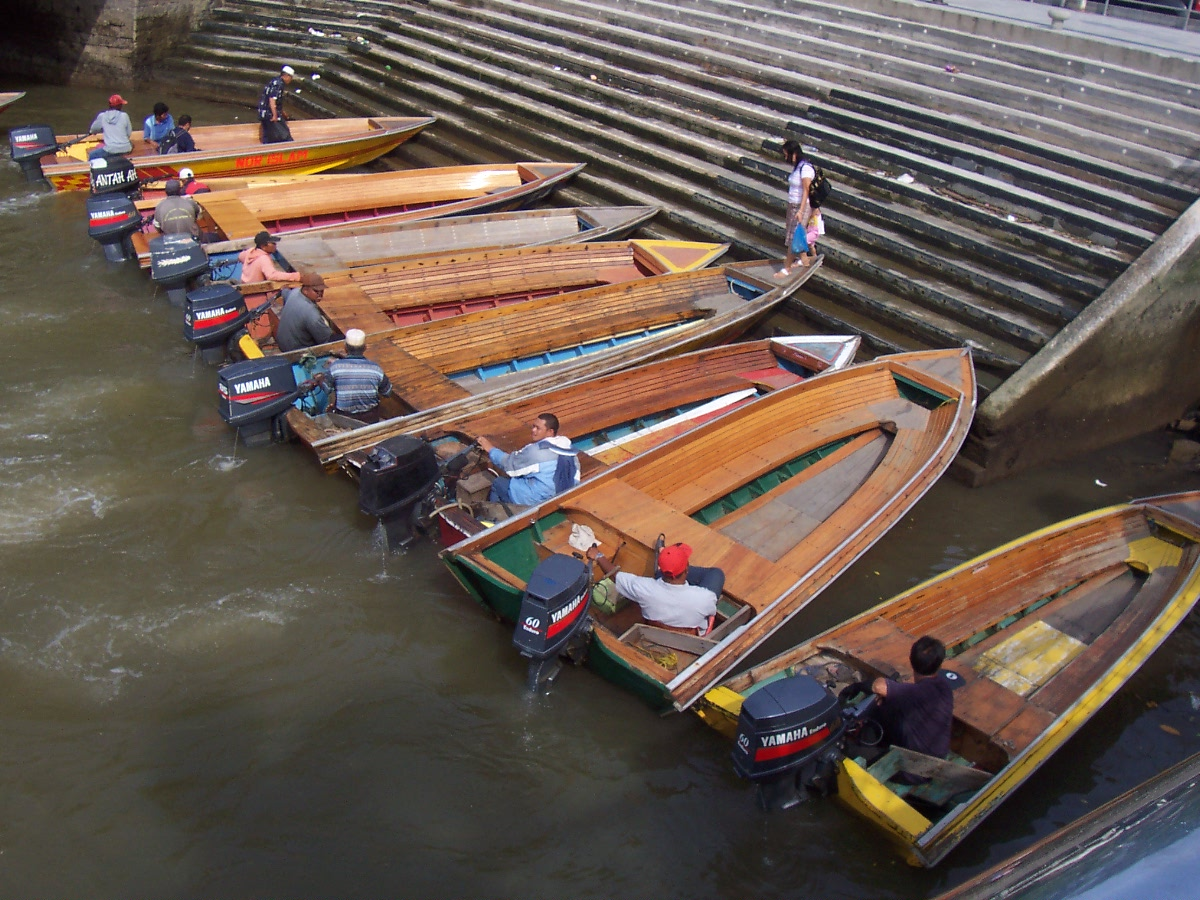
Water taxis awaiting passengers

=== Land ===
The capital is accessible by bus from Bandar Seri Begawan to the western regions of the country via road. Connectivity to the exclave of Temburong is provided by the Sultan Haji Omar Ali Saifuddien Bridge, which opened in 2020—before its construction, travellers had to pass through Sarawak, Malaysia, via the town of Limbang. Additionally, Edinburgh Bridge links the city centre to the rest of the capital by spanning the Kedayan River.

The main bus station in the capital is located in Jalan Cator underneath a multi-story car park. All public bus are moved to Waterfront due to renovation. There are six bus routes servicing Bandar Seri Begawan area; the Central Line, Circle Line, Eastern Line, Southern Line, Western Line and Northern Line. Buses operate from 6.30 am until 6.00 pm except for bus No. 1 and 20 for which services extend into the night. All bus routes begin and terminate their journey at the main bus terminal. Buses heading to other towns in Brunei such as Tutong, Seria and Kuala Belait also depart from the main bus terminal and taxicab. There are cross-border buses which depart to Kota Kinabalu, Miri and Pontianak.

=== Air ===
Brunei International Airport serves the whole country. It is located 11 km (6.8 mi) from the town centre and can be reached in 10 minutes via the Sultan Hassanal Bolkiah Highway. Royal Brunei Airlines, the national airline, has its head office in the RBA Plaza in the city.

=== Water ===
Ships up to 280 feet (85 m) long may dock in the former port of Dermaga Diraja Bandar Seri Begawan, which is located 17 miles upstream from the mouth of the Brunei River. A 124-foot passenger pier, a 730-foot reinforced concrete wharf, and an electrically powered ramp are among the port's amenities. Ships may purchase purified fresh water in the capital for $2.00 per 1,000 gallons. The Marine Department keeps track of use and bills the ship's agent. The Bandar Seri Begawan Municipal Board is credited with the money received from these water sales. Between the city and Victoria Harbour, a passenger boat that also transports mail runs every day (except for Sundays). On Mondays, Wednesdays, and Saturdays, an outboard motorboat service also carries mail and people between Bandar Seri Begawan to Bangar in Temburong District.

A water taxi service known as 'penambang' is used for transportation between downtown Bandar Seri Begawan and Kampong Ayer. Water taxis are the most common means of negotiating the waterways of Kampong Ayer. They can be hailed from the numerous "docking parts" along the banks of the Brunei River. Fares are negotiable. Regular water taxi and boat services depart for Temburong between 7:45 am and 4 pm daily, and also serve the Malaysian towns of Limbang, Lawas, Sundar and Labuan. A speedboat is used for passengers travelling to Penambang from Bangar and Limbang.

== Economy ==
The economy of Bandar Seri Begawan includes the production of furniture, textiles, handicrafts, and timber. For shopping, the Gadong commercial area is popular, offering a range of shops, restaurants, and cafes. The traditional Kianggeh Market, believed to be Brunei's oldest market, mainly sells local cuisine, seafood, and fruit. Gadong Night Market is known for its diverse food offerings, from local specialties like roti john, ambuyat, and satay to exotic fruits such as durian and jackfruit.

== Education ==
Bandar Seri Begawan is home to several notable schools across various educational levels. Primary and secondary institutions include the historic Raja Isteri Girls High School, established in 1957 as the country's first all-girls secondary school, along with private schools such as Jerudong International School and International School Brunei. The city also has government sixth form centers: Duli Pengiran Muda Al-Muhtadee Billah College for general studies and Hassanal Bolkiah Boys' Arabic Secondary School for students from Arabic secondary religious schools.

In higher education, Bandar Seri Begawan hosts two national universities: Sultan Sharif Ali Islamic University, focused on Islamic studies, and Seri Begawan Religious Teachers University College, which specialises in training teachers for religious education. Technical and vocational education is available at two campuses of the Institute of Brunei Technical Education and the Brunei Polytechnic. Additionally, two private colleges, Cosmopolitan College of Commerce and Technology and Laksamana College of Business, offer bachelor programs.

== International relations ==
Several countries have set up their embassies, commissions or consulates in Bandar Seri Begawan, including Australia, Bangladesh, Belgium, Benin, Burkina Faso, Burma (Myanmar), Cambodia, Canada, Chile, China, Finland, France, Germany, India, Indonesia, Japan, Laos, Malaysia, Netherlands, New Zealand, North Korea, Oman, Pakistan, Philippines, Poland, Russia, Saudi Arabia, Singapore, South Korea, Sweden, Switzerland, Taiwan, Thailand, United Kingdom, United States and Vietnam.

== Sister cities ==
- Nanjing, PR China
- Jakarta, Indonesia
- Tokyo, Japan
- Kuala Lumpur, Malaysia
- London, United Kingdom

== Gallery ==
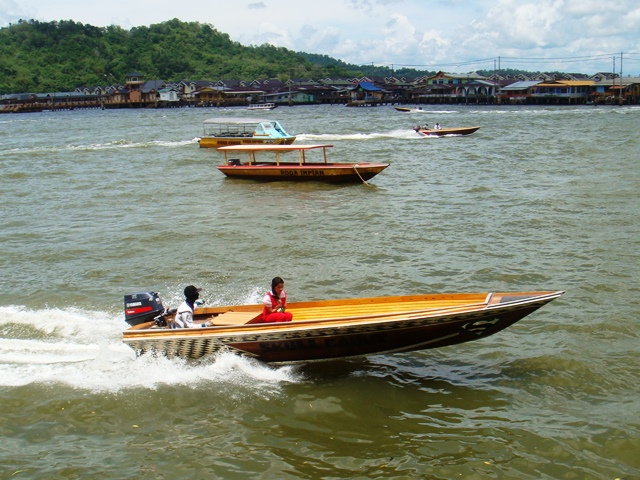
Water taxis on the Brunei River

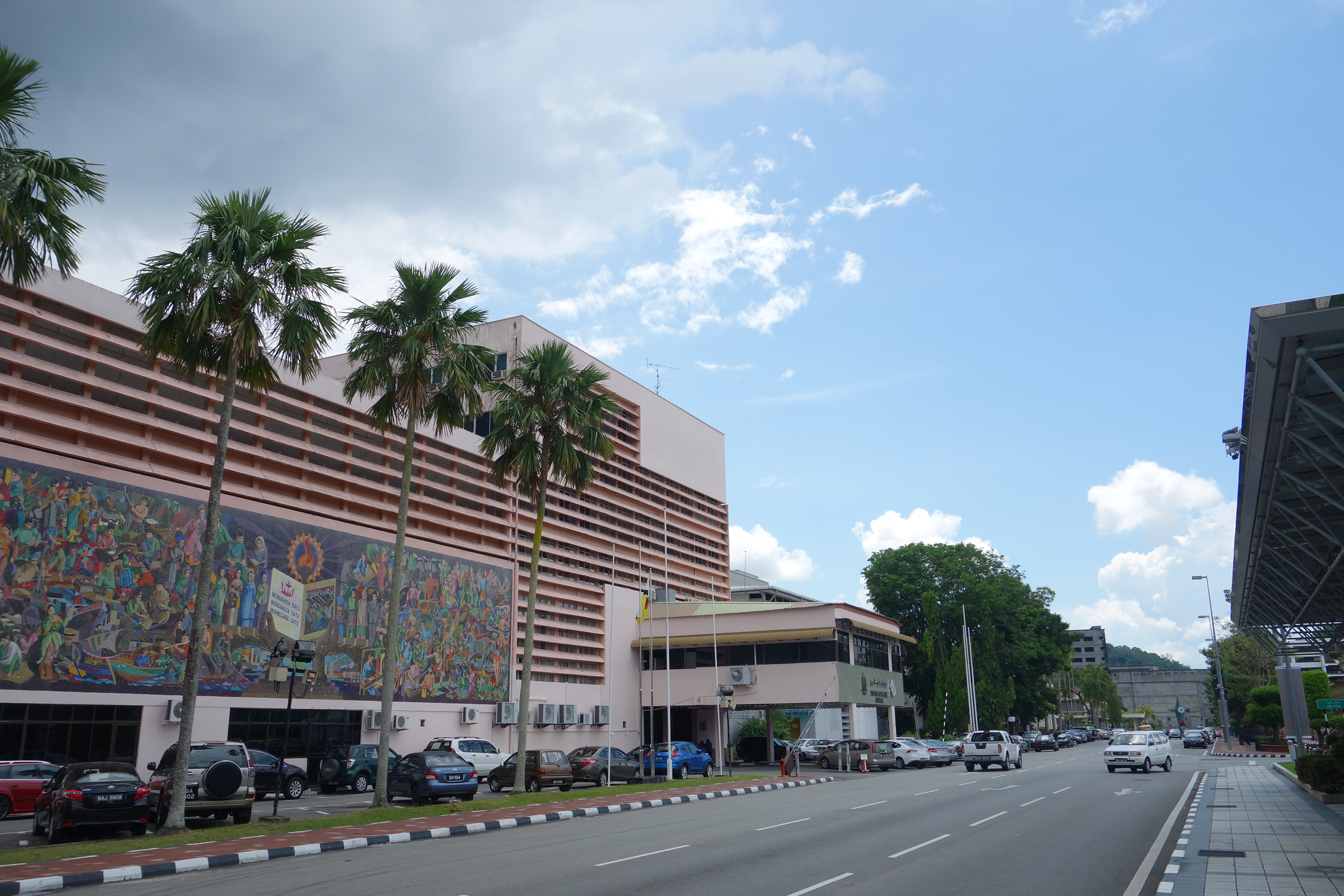
Dewan Bahasa dan Pustaka Library

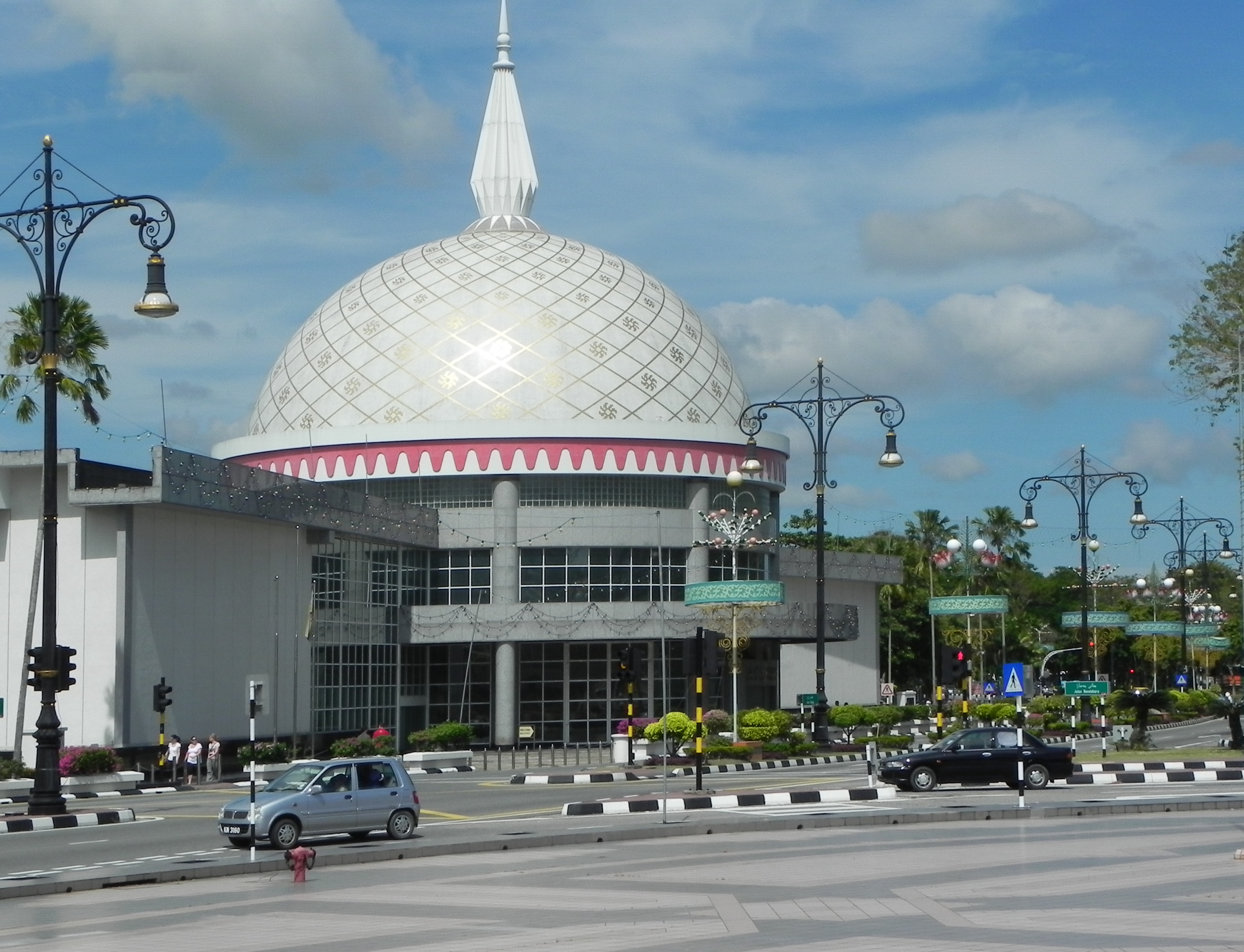
Royal Regalia Museum

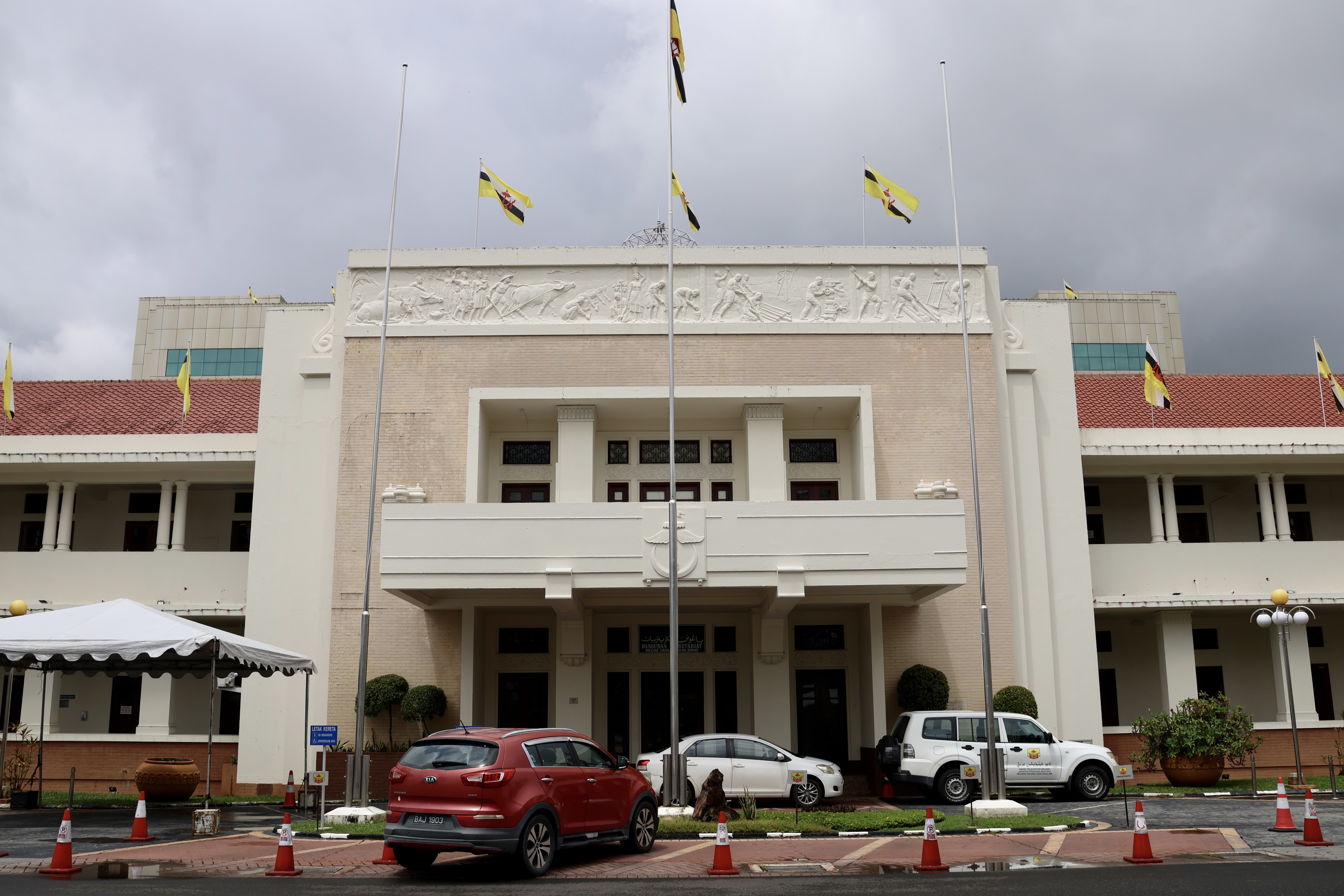
Secretariat Building

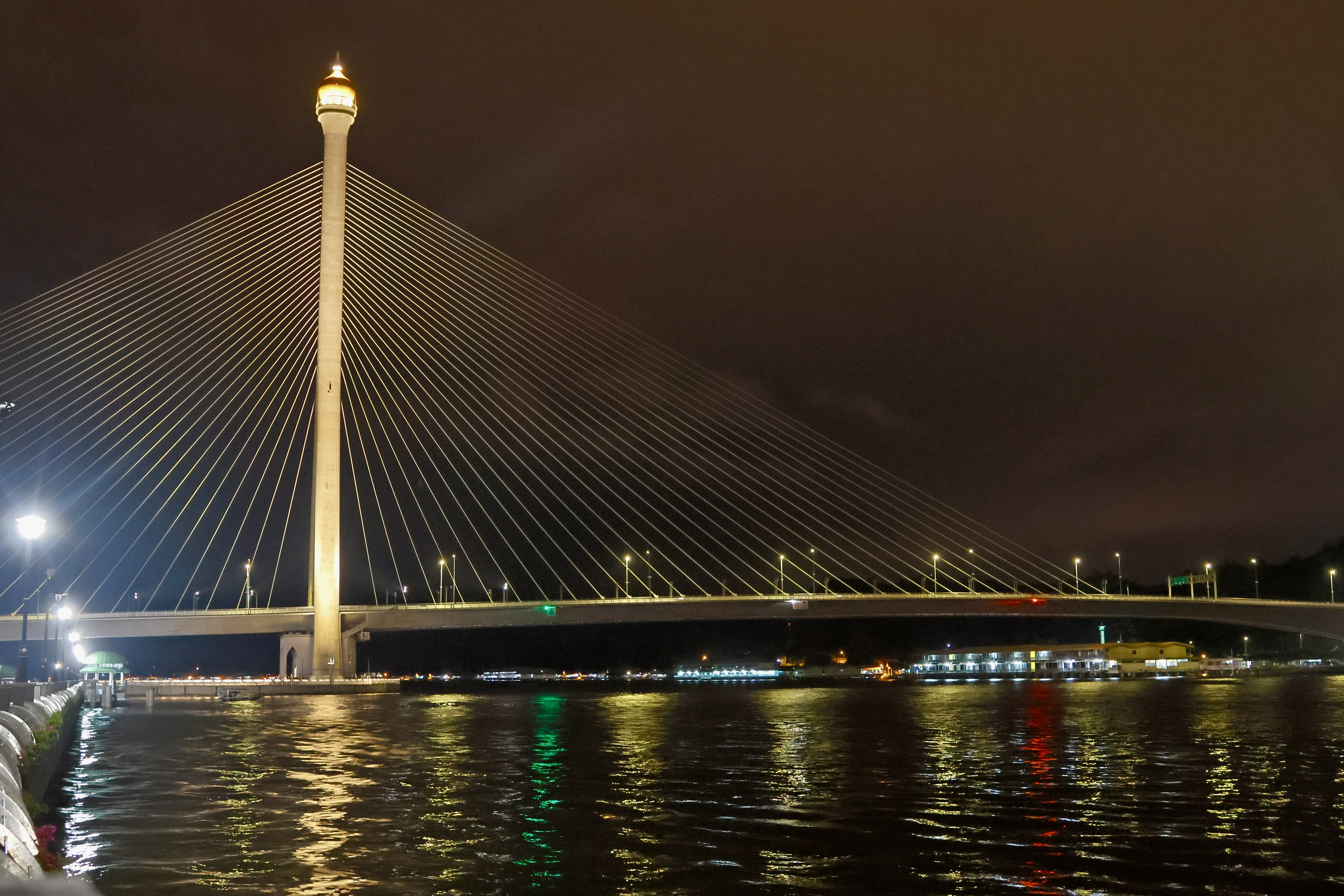
Raja Isteri Pengiran Anak Hajah Saleha Bridge

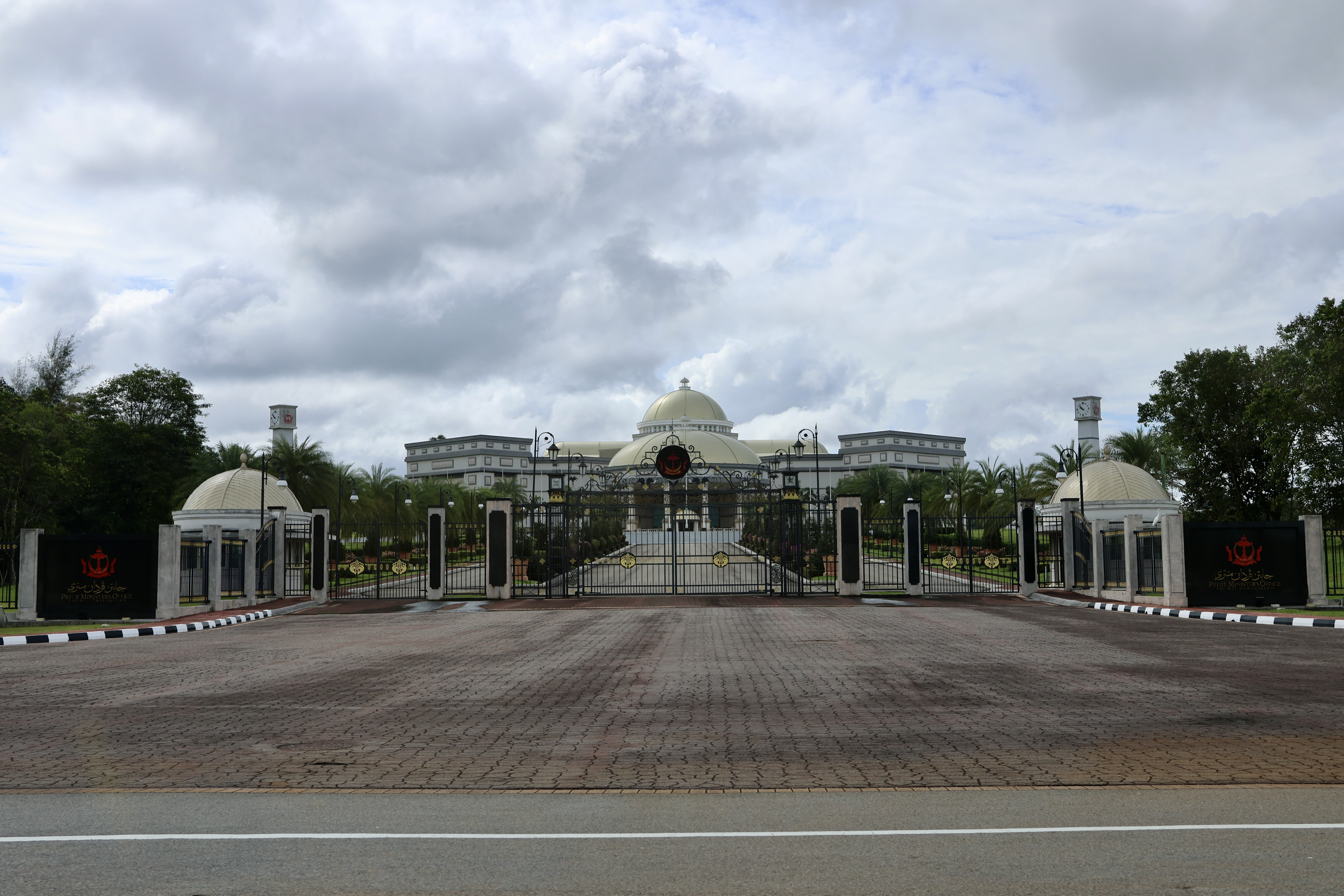
Prime Minister's Office

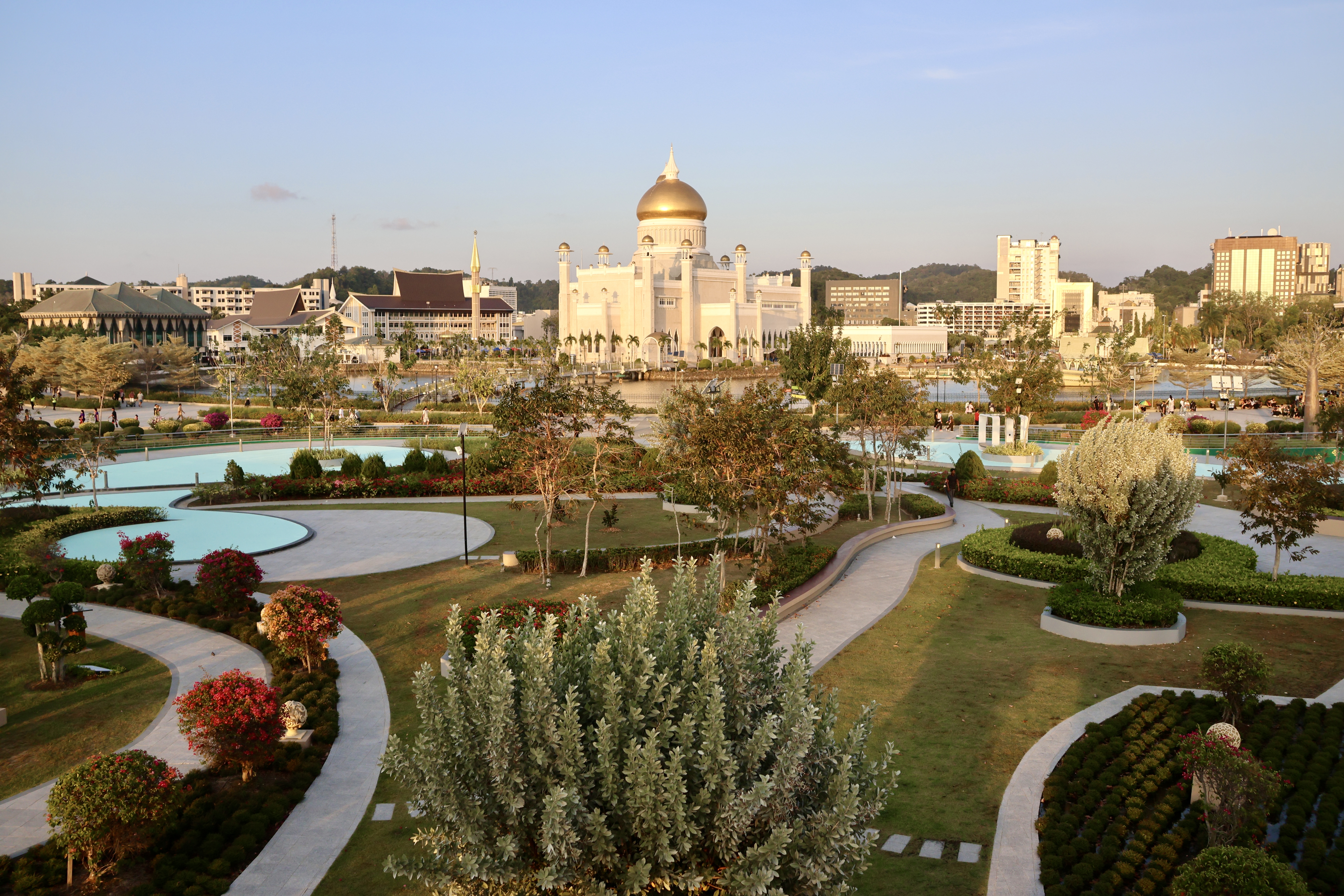
Taman Mahkota Jubli Emas

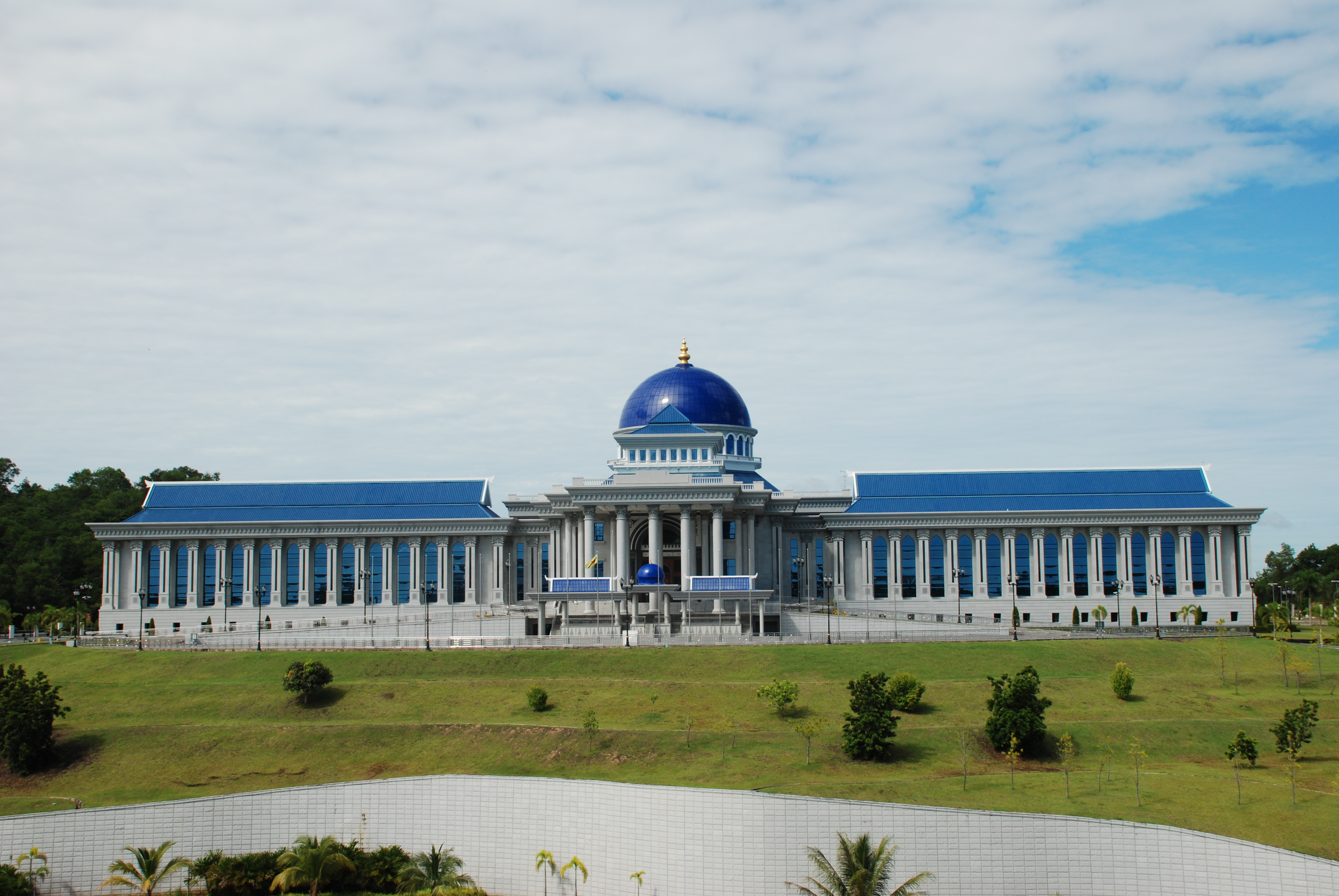
Dewan Majlis

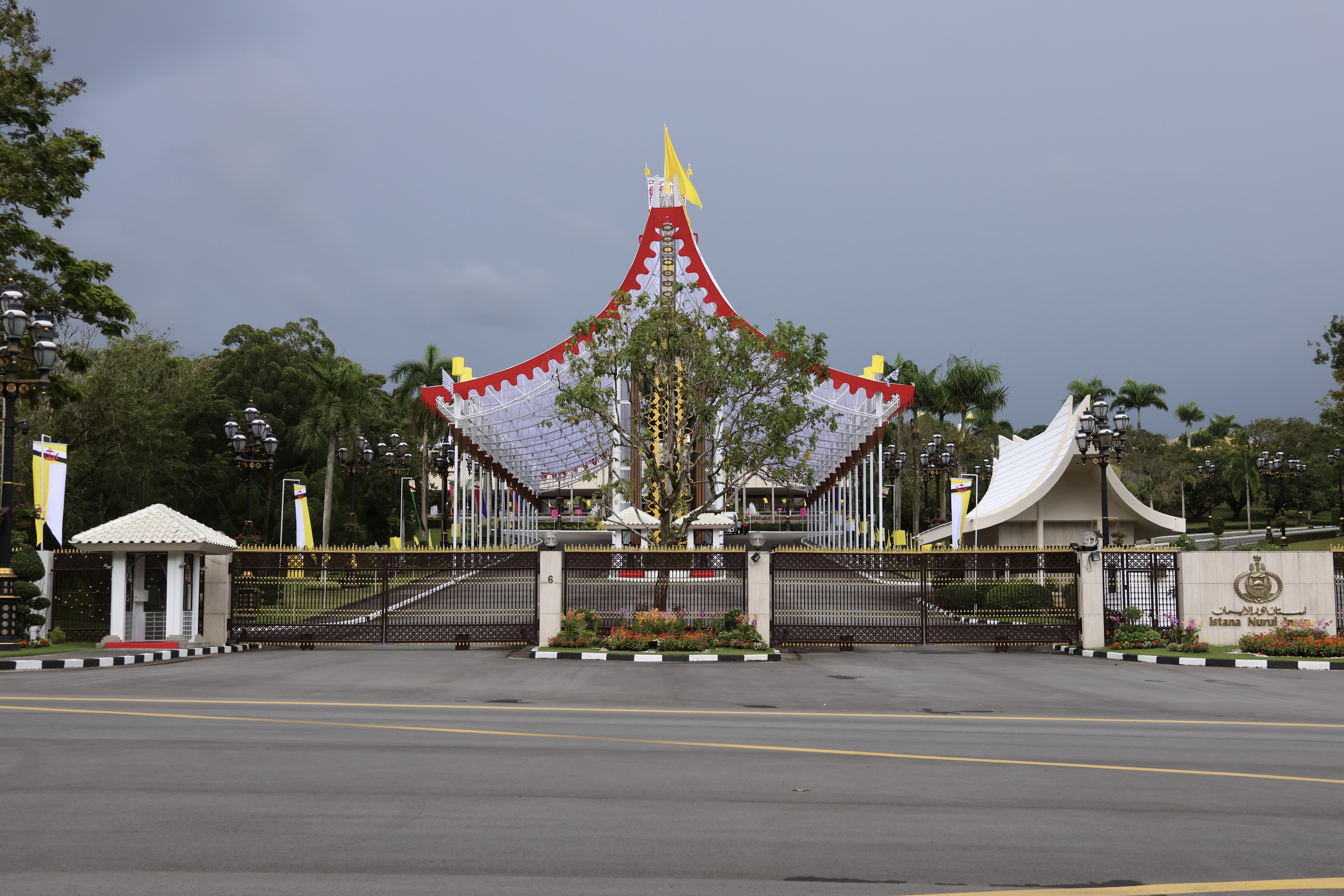
Istana Nurul Iman

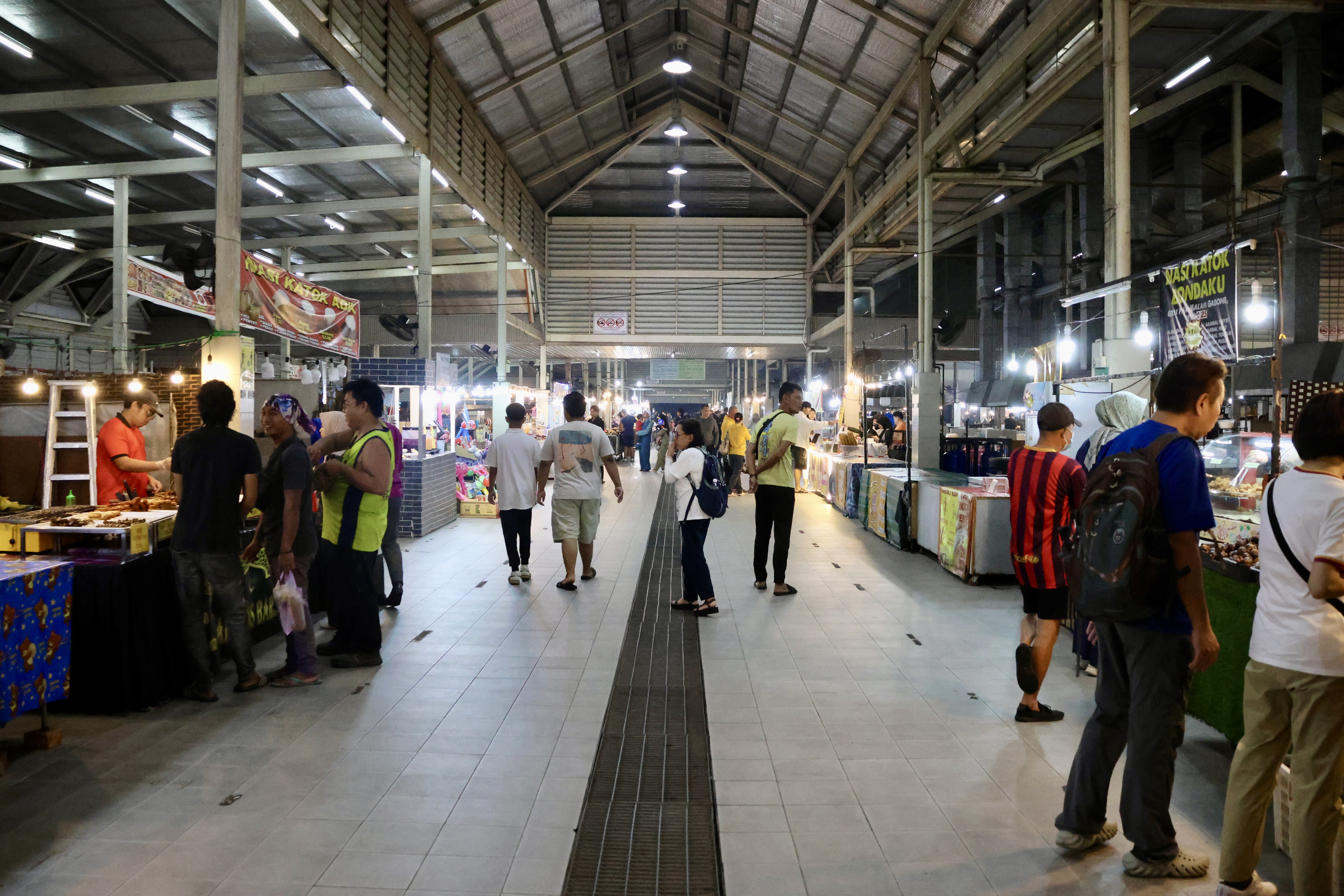
Gadong Night Market

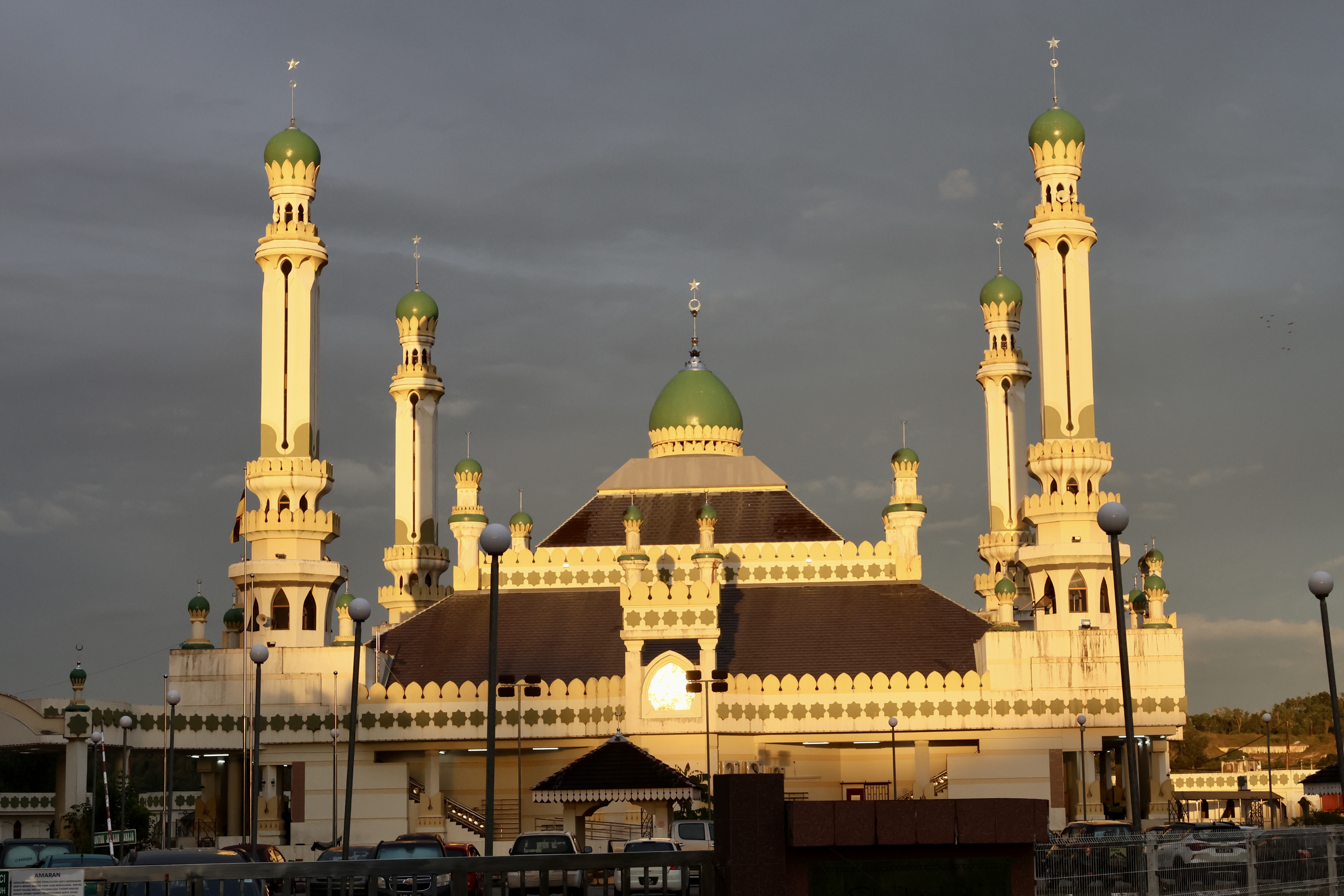
Duli Pengiran Muda Mahkota Pengiran Muda Haji Al-Muhtadee Billah Mosque

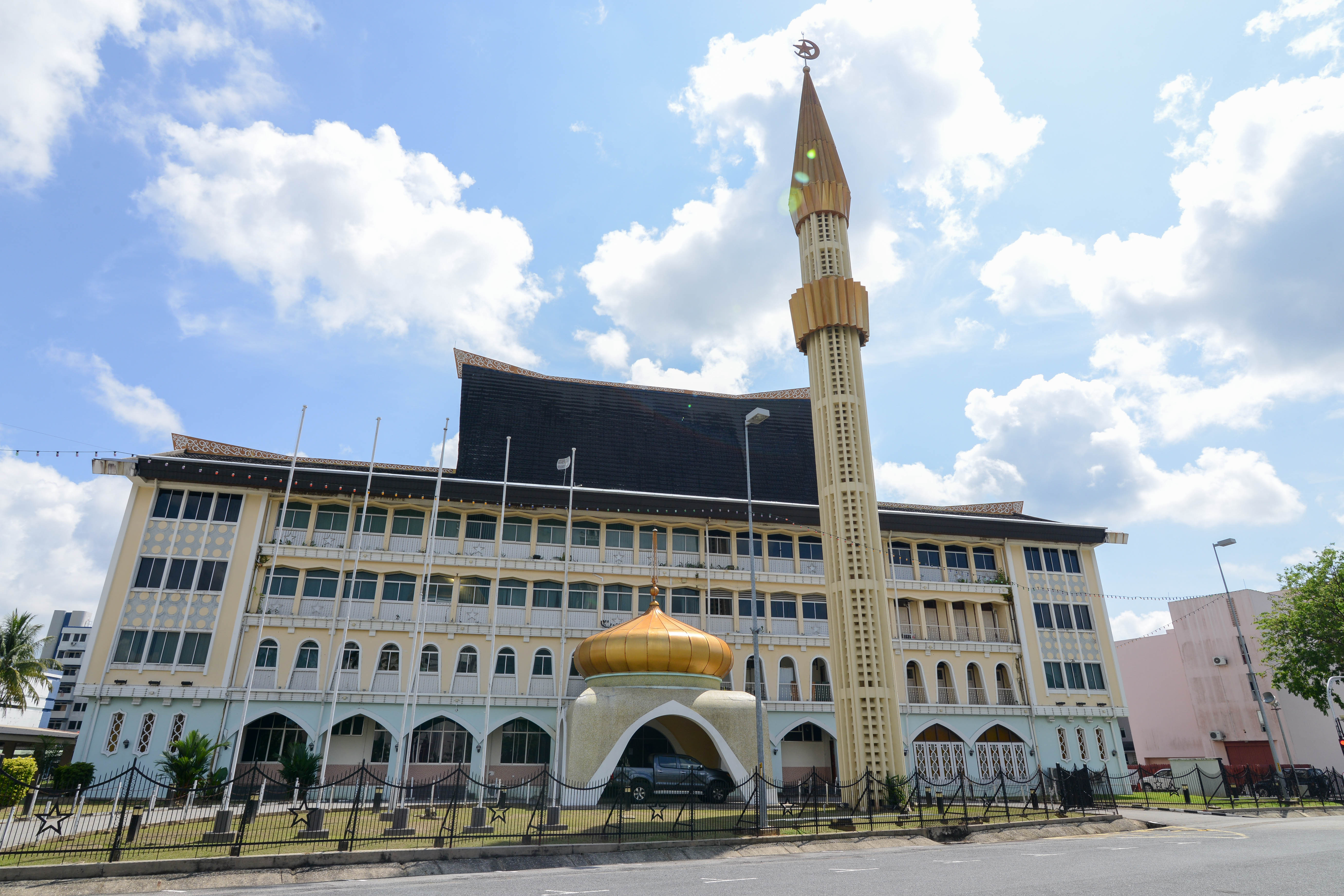
Department of Syariah Affairs building

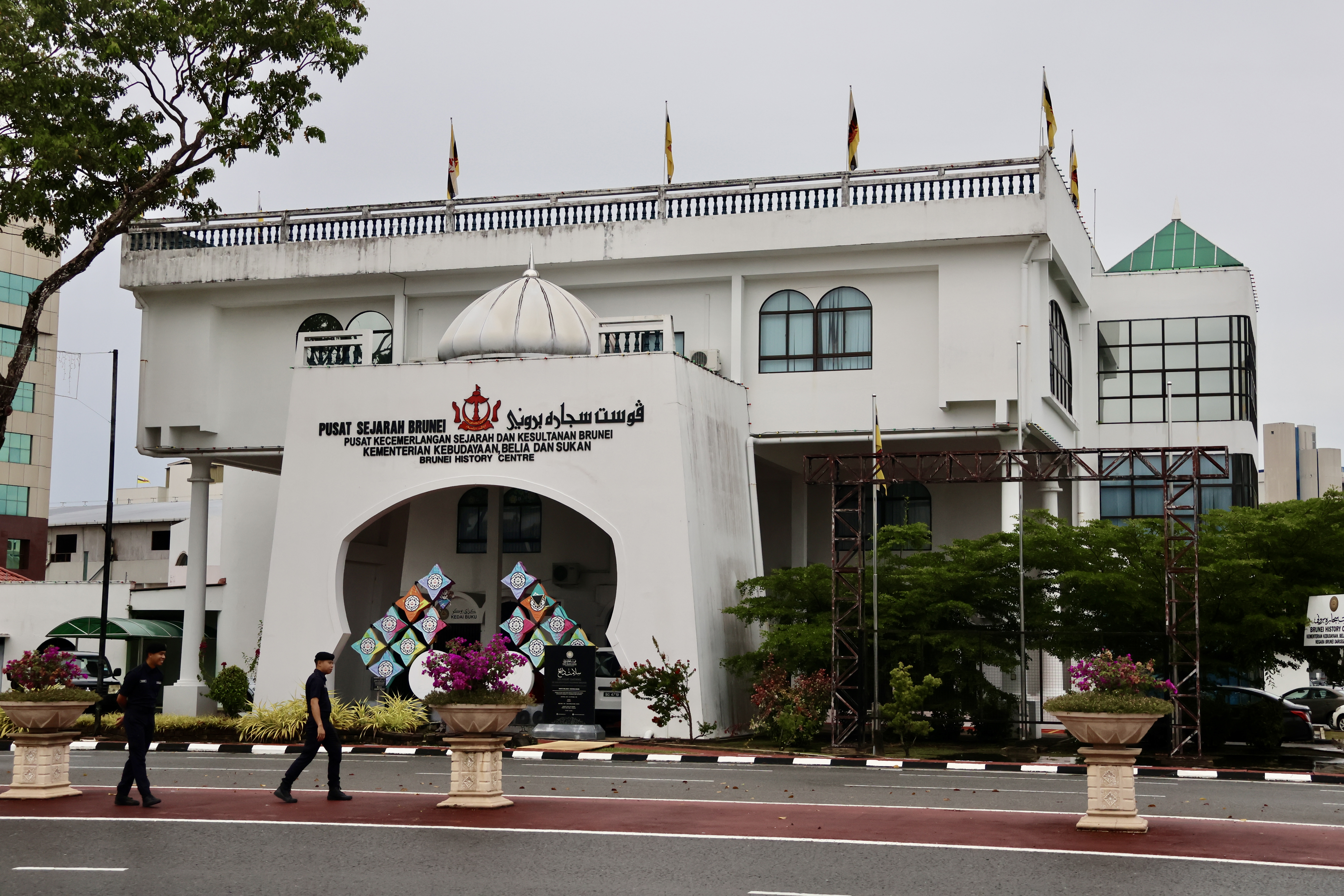
Brunei History Centre

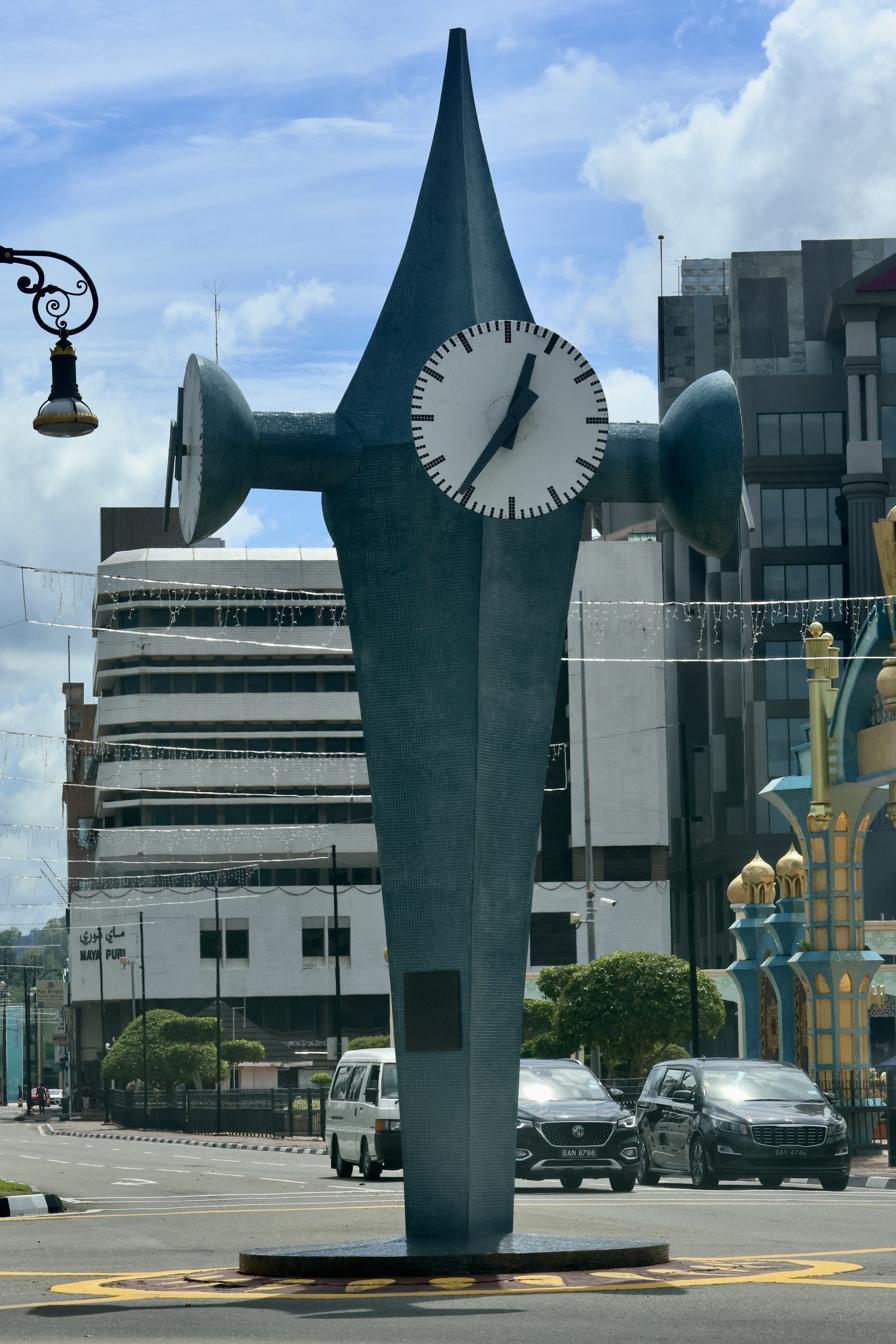
Time Piece Monument

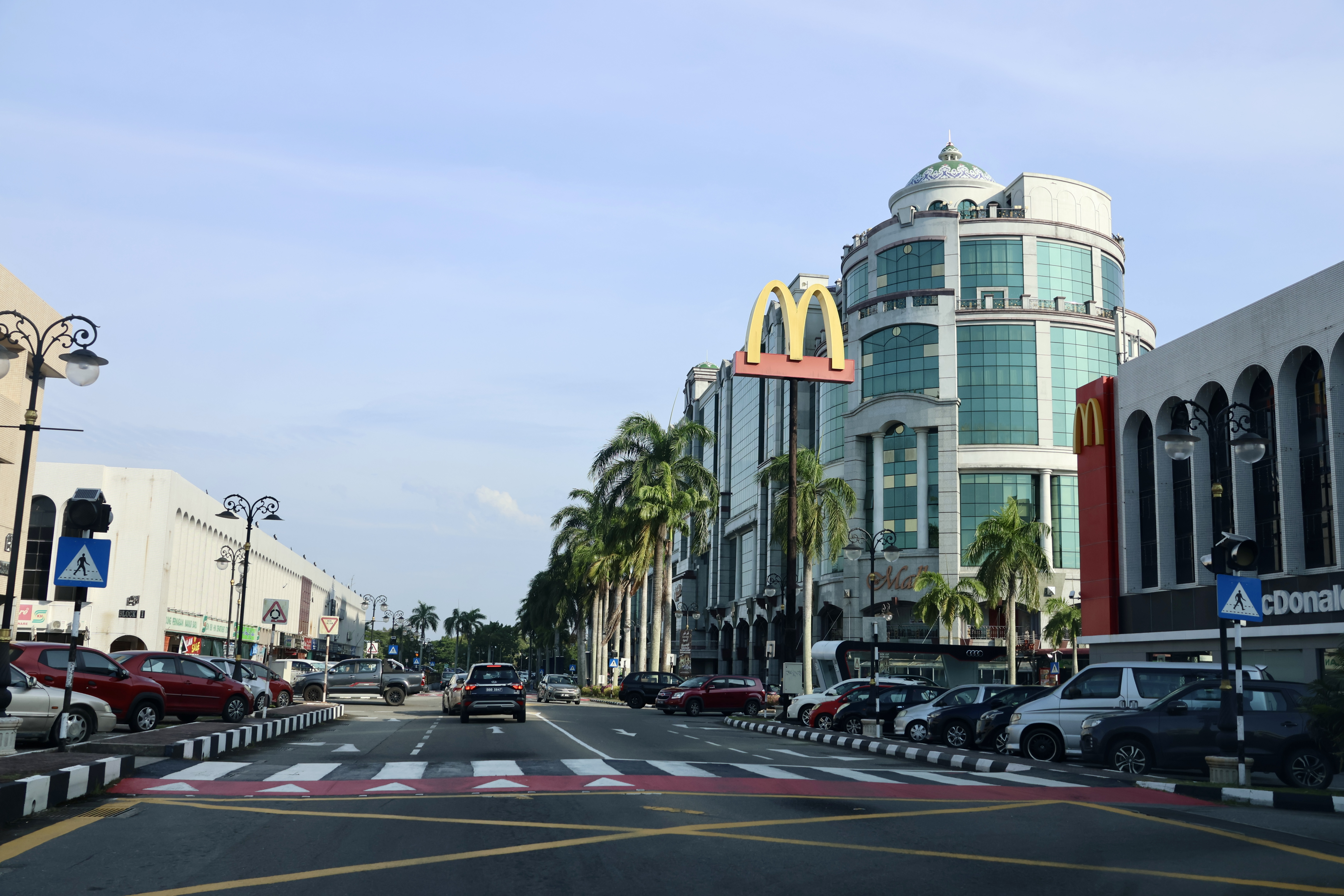
Gadong commercial area

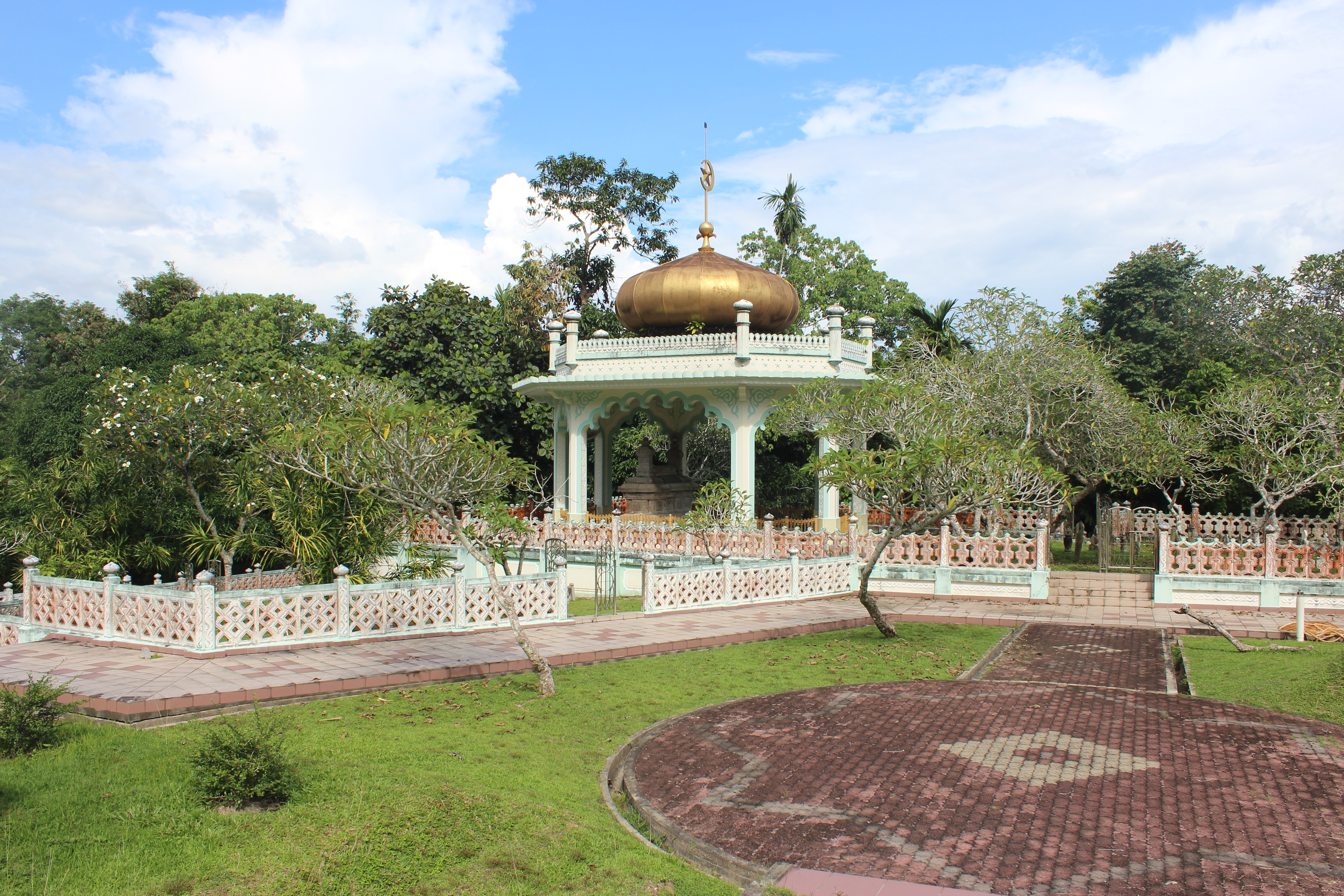
Tomb of Sultan Bolkiah
