= Taman Mahkota Jubli Emas =

Public park in Brunei

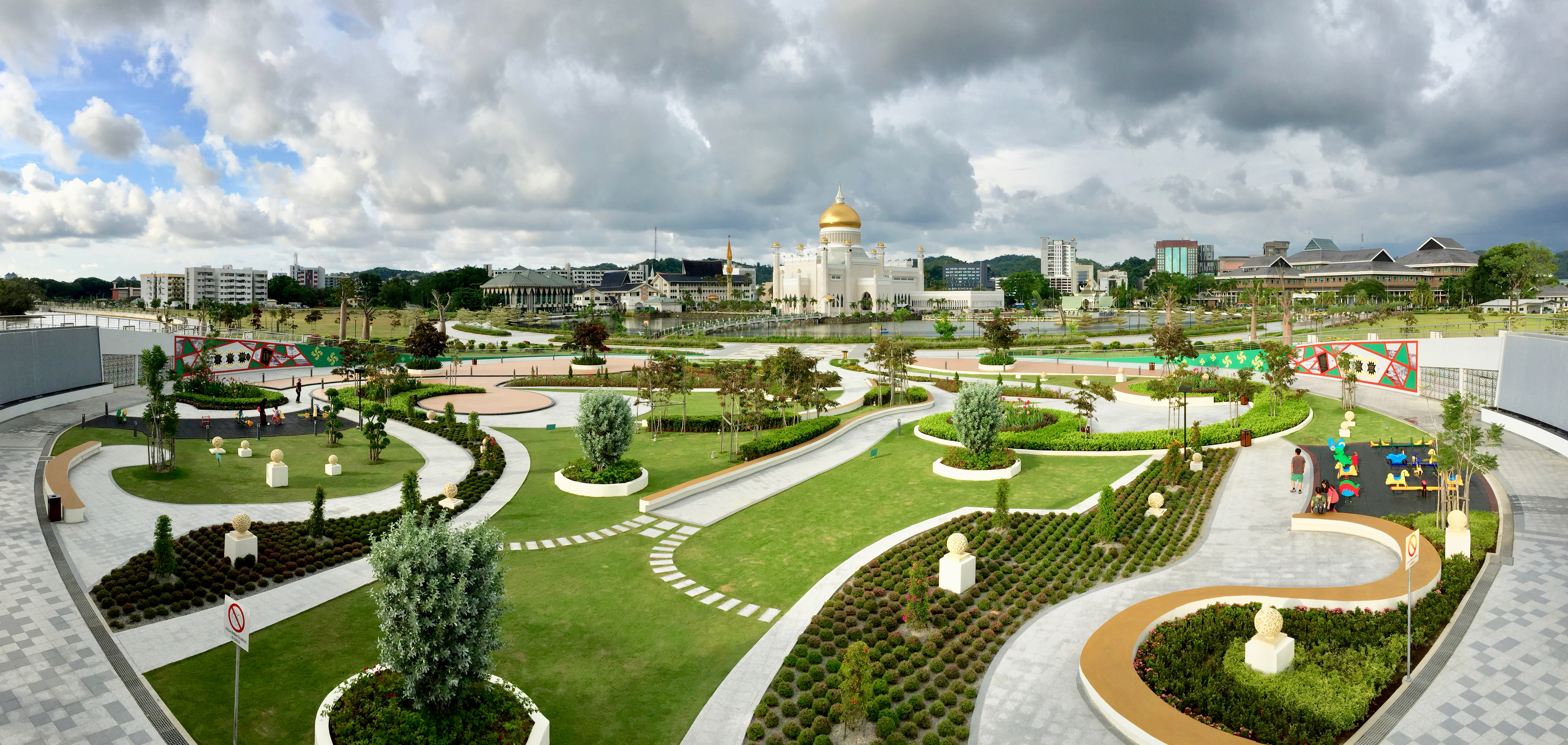
- The park with the backdrop of the Omar Ali Saifuddien Mosque
- Type: Public park and promenade
- Location: Pusat Bandar, Bandar Seri Begawan, Brunei
- Coordinates: 4°53′18.8″N 114°56′14.8″E
- Area: 12 hectares (30 acres)
- Opened: 22 October 2017; 7 years ago
- Etymology: Golden Jubilee of Hassanal Bolkiah
- Managed by: Department of Environment, Parks and Recreation (Note: The Ministry of Development's Department of Environment, Parks, and Recreation is in charge of overseeing the nation's recreational areas' upkeep and landscaping.)
- Parking: On site (no charge)

Taman Mahkota Jubli Emas (from the Malay name, literally 'Golden Jubilee Crown Park'), initially known as Eco-Corridor Park (Malay: Taman Eko-Koridor), is a riverfront public park in the former Mukim Sungai Kedayan of Bandar Seri Begawan, Brunei. The park was inaugurated on 22 October 2017 in conjunction with the Golden Jubilee of Sultan Hassanal Bolkiah's accession to the throne as the 29th and current Sultan of Brunei.

== Background ==
The park was the primary outcome of the Sungai Kedayan Eco-Corridor project (hence the name Eco-Corridor Park), a project to revitalise the Kedayan River through flood mitigation, environmental rehabilitation and development of public spaces. The project is also part of the broader Bandar Seri Begawan Development Master Plan which aims to revitalise the capital, particularly in the city centre, with further developments of commercial, residential, social and utility infrastructures.

== History ==
The construction on the park began in January 2016 as part of the 10th National Development Plan (Rancangan Kemajuan Negara Ke-10 or RKN10) under the Ministry of Development. The project was slated for completion in May 2018 but in actual it was completed 8 months earlier.

On 22 October 2017, the park was officially inaugurated by Sultan Hassanal Bolkiah in conjunction with the Golden Jubilee of his accession to the throne which was celebrated on 5 October 2017.

== Description ==
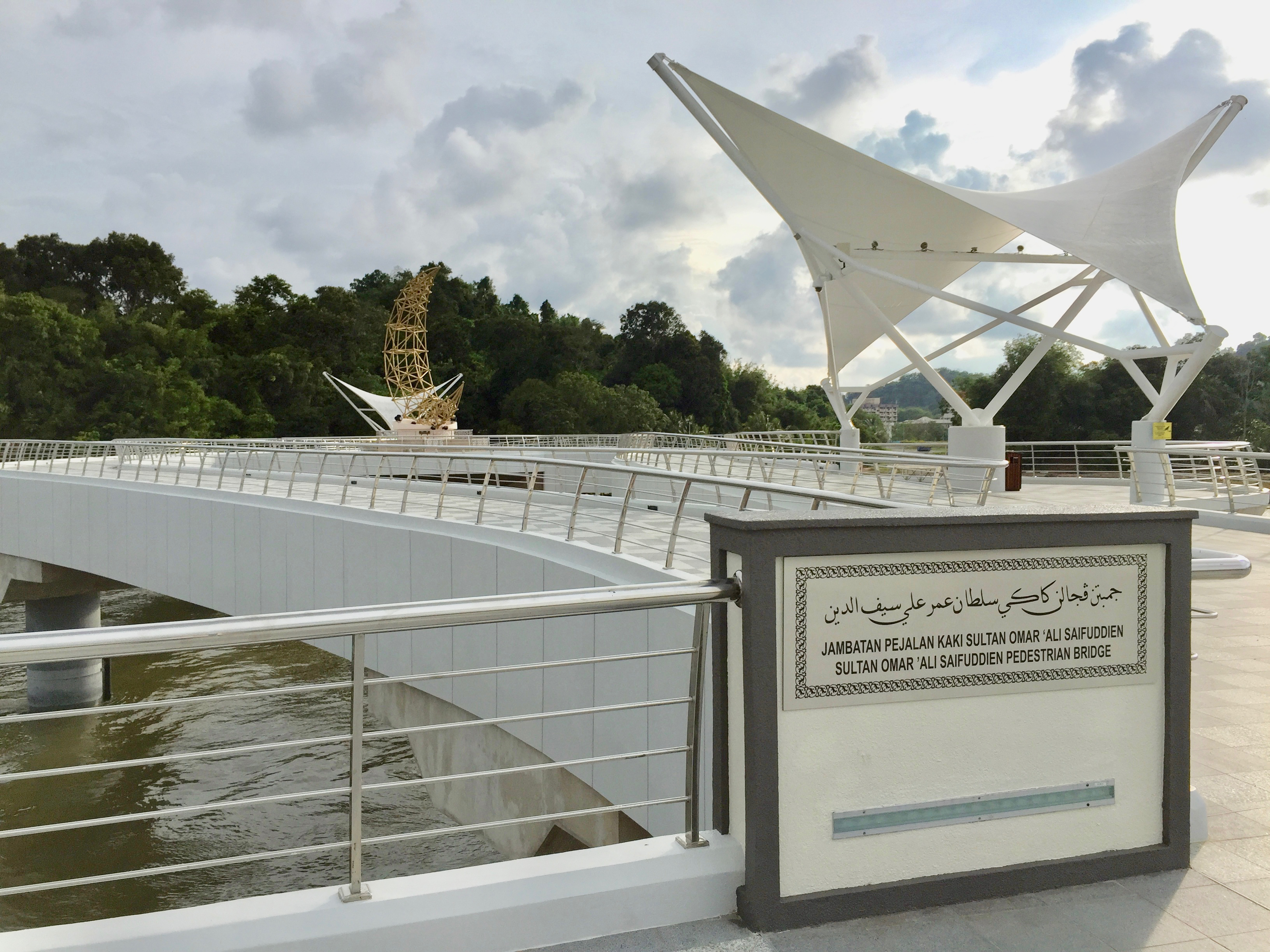
Sultan Omar 'Ali Saifuddien Pedestrian Bridge

Taman Mahkota Jubli Emas is a 12-hectare (30-acre) riverfront park located on a riverbank section along the Kedayan River leading to the mouth which flows into the Brunei River. The park features 6-metre wide promenade for pedestrian and cyclists, as well as a garden and green spaces for recreational activities.

There are eleven access points into the park: nine from the land and two from the river via jetties. One of the access points is through Sultan Omar 'Ali Saifuddien Pedestrian Bridge, which crosses the river and connects the park with the opposite riverbank near the commercial area Batu Satu.

== Criticism ==
The park and the Eco-Corridor project in general are developed in the Mukim Sungai Kedayan neighbourhoods of Kampong Ayer. The development inevitably caused the relocation of some 500 residents from the area and the entire mukim is now ceased to exist. The project has caused an increased concern on the vitality of the Kampong Ayer community, which has already been under threat from the dwindling population due to continuous emigration to the land over the years.
