= Raja Ayang Mausoleum =

Mausoleum in Bandar Seri Begawan, Brunei

- Makam Raja Ayang
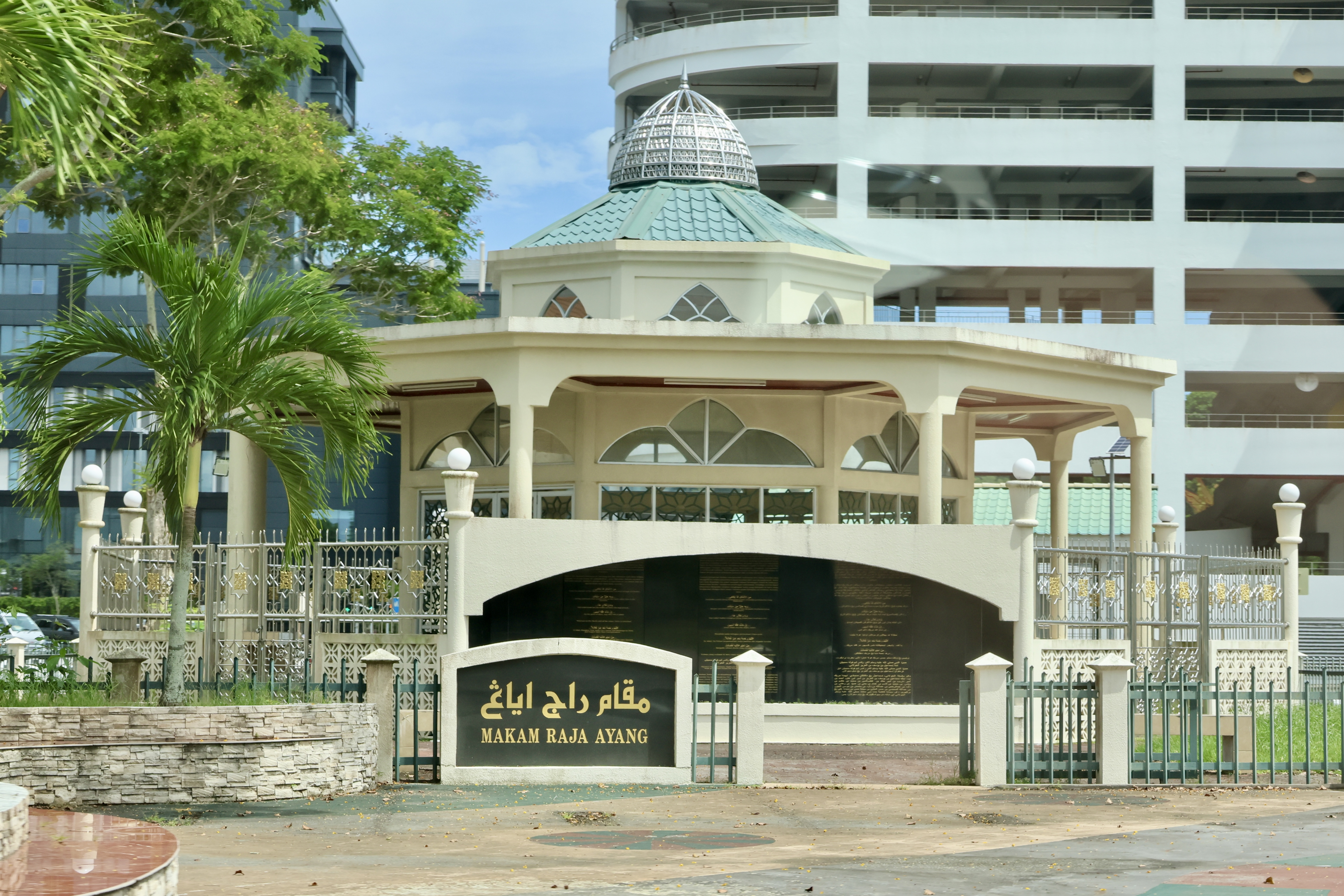
- Entrance to the Raja Ayang Mausoleum
- Interactive map of the Raja Ayang Mausoleum area

General information
- Type: Mausoleum
- Architectural style: Islamic architecture
- Location: Jalan Sultan Omar Ali Saifuddien, Pusat Bandar, Bandar Seri Begawan, Brunei
- Coordinates: 4°53′24″N 114°56′34″E
- Renovated: September 2008
- Owner: Brunei History Centre

Other information
- Parking: On site (no charge)

The Raja Ayang Mausoleum (Malay: Makam Raja Ayang) is a historical mausoleum in Bandar Seri Begawan, Brunei. It is believed to honour a royal punished for incest in the 15th century, became a site of cultural significance where visitors seek blessings despite the resulting damage from offerings. Renovated in 2008 with a dome structure, it preserves Brunei's history while safeguarding the tomb from further deterioration.

== Design and features ==
From the mausoleum area, all that is visible is a small hut with an iron fence and a roof supported by pillars. Inside are three stone tombstones, one of which is a sandstone gravestone adorned with carvings and inscriptions in Javanese script. Another gravestone is plain, without carvings or inscriptions, made of gravel. The burial ground is enclosed by a concrete wall and an octagonal iron fence with an opening of about 7 metres (23 ft). The mausoleum, located in the city centre, is enclosed by a gated but unguarded fence, allowing visitors to easily access the area. Its open design enables people to sit in meditation and present offerings, drawing interest for its accessibility and unique setting amidst an urban landscape.

== History and legend ==
The legend states that a small hill, approximately 3 meters high, 6 meters wide, and 8 meters long, once existed inside the mausoleum and was believed to be man-made. The inside of this hill was hollow and separated into compartments, like a gigantic inverted crater. Inside, a chimney was constructed to provide ventilation and a means of expelling cooking smoke. According to oral legend, Raja Ayang (Note: Also known as Dang Ayang.) was imprisoned inside this hill together with her biological brother and concubines. There was enough food for them, and the absence of smoke coming from the hill was an indication that they had passed. This story has had a significant influence on Brunei's collective memory and has been passed down through the centuries.

According to legend, the mausoleum is thought to memorialise the burial of Raja Ayang, a lady who, in the 15th century, had an affair with her biological brother. They were supposedly members of the royal family and descendants of Sultan Yusof during the 15th century reign of Sultan Sulaiman. The punishment is believed to have taken place around or soon after the death of a person called Ismael in 1454, which is near to the death of Sultan Abdul Majid Hassan's daughter, Rokayah, in 1457, even though the gravestone does not specify the specific date. Following in the footsteps of his father, Sharif Ali, this incident most likely occurred under Sulaiman's reign, which is renowned for its tough Islamic governance. The distance between the mausoleum and Kota Batu's palace indicates that it was picked as a place of seclusion for harsh punishment.

The Boxer Codex, documented by a Spaniard who traveled to and lived in Brunei, tells of Sultan Yusof, a ruler believed to have come from Cauin ("Khawlun" in the southern Arabian Peninsula) with a large fleet. Upon arrival, Sultan Yusof and his forces conquered the Bisaya people of Brunei. After securing power, he traveled to China, married a royal princess, and returned to Brunei with her. Their descendants reportedly became rulers of the Brunei Sultanate, with a descendant ruling by 1590. While the Boxer Codex names this sultan as "Sultan Lixar" (interpreted as Sultan Saiful Rijal), records from the Brunei History Centre identify Sultan Muhammad Hasan as the ruler in 1590, suggesting Saiful Rijal may have reigned later than traditionally thought.

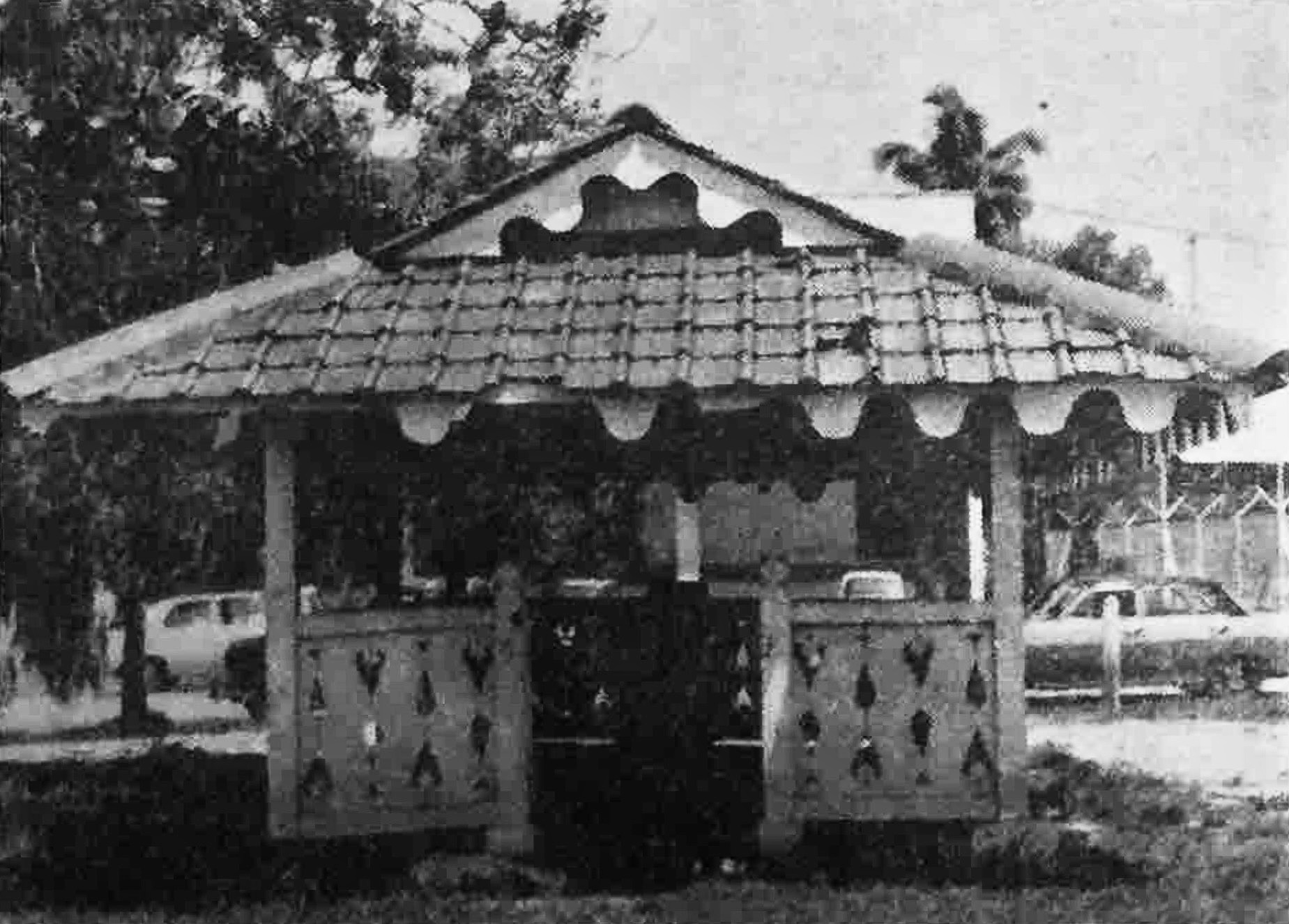
The mausoleum in 1967

The burial site was damaged during the Borneo campaign in May 1945. According to the elders' oral histories, the "small hill" remained in place until 1946, following the Japanese occupation, and before the Omar Ali Saifuddien Mosque was built (before the 1950s). The construction of a tarred road (Jalan Elizabeth II) close by, as well as the 1950s construction of the General Post Office Building and the old Radio Brunei building near the tomb, are likely to have contributed to the loss of the "small hill."

As part of their promises to satisfy their own aspirations, such as winning at gaming, visitors to the mausoleum sometimes bring odd presents, including candles, perfume, and even bouquets of chicken feathers. The idea of a "good watchman" guarding the tomb feeds their conviction in its holiness, which makes people reverent toward the location. Both Muslims and non-Muslims visit the tomb, especially at night, to meditate and give gifts in the hope that their desires would be fulfilled, even though Islamic law forbids such behaviour. This conduct has caused the gravestone inscriptions to sustain serious damage. Candle wax and other offerings have left the surfaces burned and illegible, resulting in the loss of important historical data.

As part of the National Development Plan 2007–2012, the mausoleum was planned for reconstruction in the shape of a cottage, which will transform its roof into a dome. It is intended to not only enhance the physical appearance but also to attract the attention of those who observe him when his tomb is subsequently rebuilt. The Public Works Department successfully repaired and constructed the tomb in September 2008, and it was turned over to the Brunei History Centre in October 2009.

== Findings ==
The words on the gravestone are carved in relief, although they are hard to see because of the surface deterioration and blackening caused by candle burns. The inscription, which dates to 859 H (1454 AD), was examined and photographed by the Brunei Museums Department in 1973. The tombstone's style is similar to that of tombstones from the 15th and 16th centuries. There are still some identifiable calligraphy lines. According to a 1986 investigation, a stone facing south has less legible lettering that may be from a prayer or Surah Al-Mu'min, verse 64. Another broken stone with six vertical lines of Jawi script in Arabic naskh calligraphy may be seen outside the hut to the west. The findings noted that the gravestone of Sultan Abdul Majid Hassan's daughter, Rokayah bears Sultan Yusof's name, despite the fact that it is not mentioned in the Batu Tarsilah or other historical documents. Questions concerning Yusof's royal rank and potential relationship to the two siblings in this fabled tale are brought up by the inscription.
