= Old Lapau =

Historic building in Brunei

- Lapau Lama
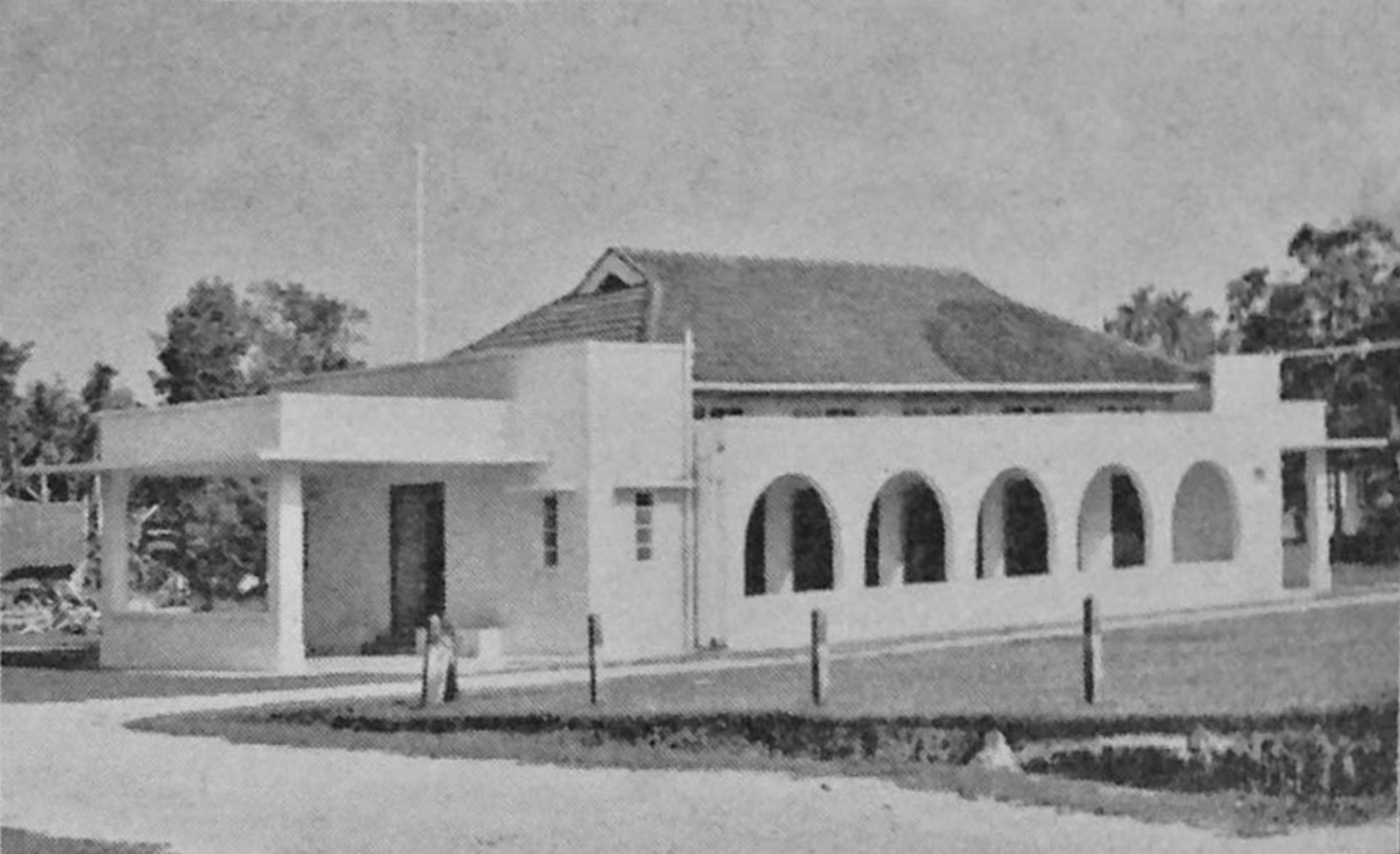
- Lapau in the 1950s
- Former names: Lapau

General information
- Type: Historic site and museum
- Architectural style: Contemporary architecture
- Location: Pusat Bandar
- Address: Jalan James Pearce
- Town or city: Bandar Seri Begawan
- Country: Brunei
- Coordinates: 4°53′29″N 114°56′30″E
- Completed: 1 July 1950
- Opened: 10 May 1951

Technical details
- Material: concrete

Other information
- Parking: On site (no charge)

The Old Lapau (Malay: Lapau Lama) or formerly known as Lapau, is a historic building in Bandar Seri Begawan, Brunei. It was the former Lapau (royal ceremonial hall) prior to the existence of the current Lapau building. It was also where the Constitution of Brunei was promulgated in 1959. It now houses a museum pertaining to the Constitution.

== History ==
Built on Jalan James Pearce in Pusat Bandar, Brunei Town (present day Bandar Seri Begawan) on 1 July 1950, it functioned as a ceremonial hall for royal occasions and national gatherings. It formally replaced the Lapau Kajang building, which had been in use throughout Sultan Ahmad Tajuddin's reign, on 10 May 1951. Later on 31 May, Sultan Omar Ali Saifuddien III was crowned as the 28th Sultan of Brunei. The building also hosted the annual Sultan's birthday celebration on 23 September and the signing of the Brunei Constitution on 29 September 1959. It also served as a court, a place of worship, a meeting place for the Legislative Council, and a location to host foreign dignitaries.

The building eventually could not accommodate the growing capacity and a new building was built which effectively replaced the existing building from 1968 until today. It was a well-known structure prior to the 1968 construction of the larger and newer Lapau. Since then, the building's purpose has gradually diminished, and it is now only an exhibition hall affixed to the 1987 Brunei History Centre (PSB) building. The majority of the Old Lapau's original structure is still in place from more than 50 years ago. Since September 2018 the building now houses the 1959 Brunei Constitution Gallery (Galeri Perlembagaan Negeri Brunei 1959), a museum which showcases visual information on the constitution. The building has been officially designated as a historic site under the Antiquities and Treasure Trove Act of Brunei. Maintaining the originality of the room's flooring, fan, chandeliers, table, chairs, and even the amplifiers that the Sultan personally used.

== Design and features ==
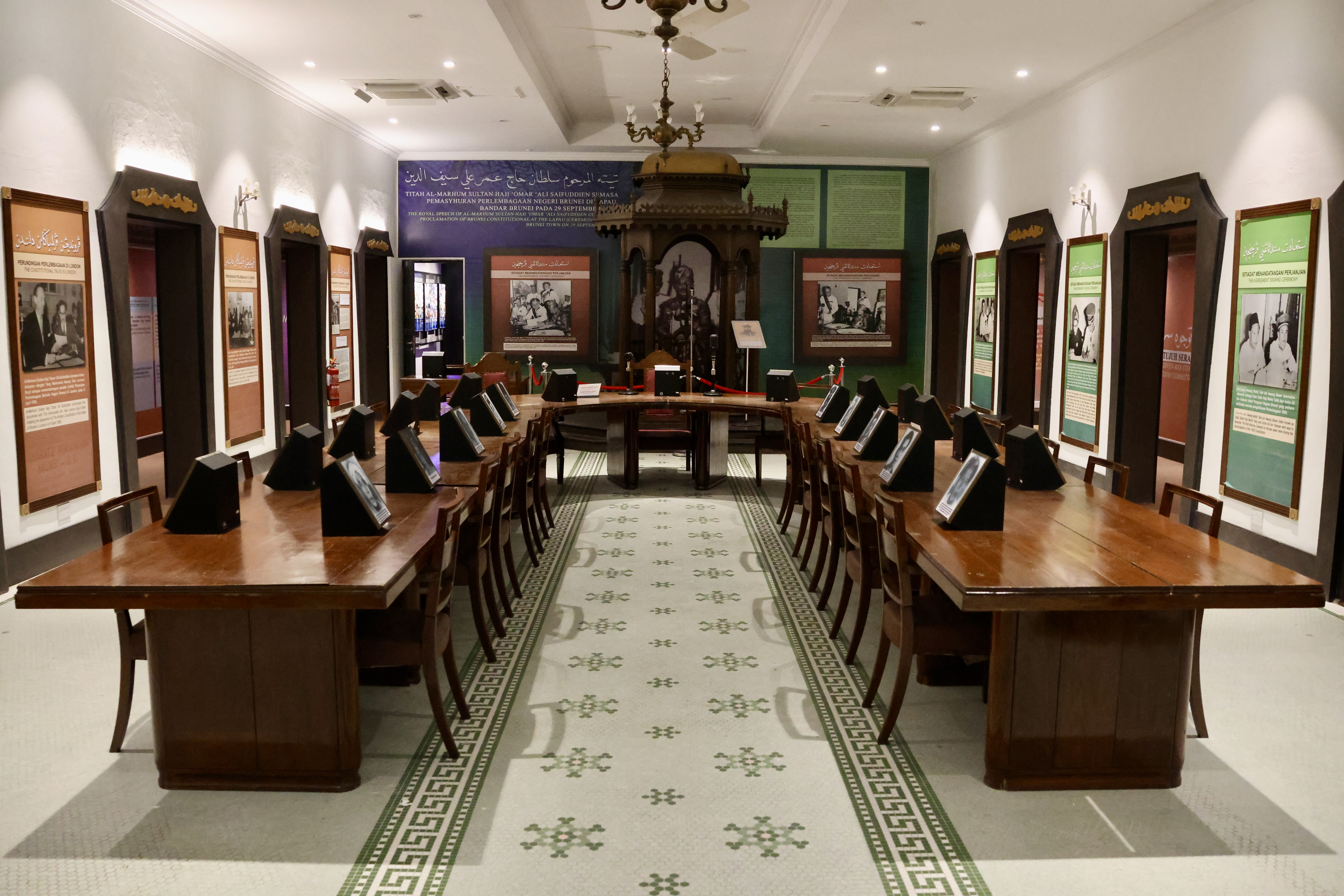
The 1959 Brunei Constitution Gallery in 2024

From the form of its body to its roof, the concrete structure is reminiscent of the architecture of its Lapau Kajang predecessor, but updated. Concrete structures were practically nonexistent in the city at the time of construction, and obtaining the necessary tools was a challenge. As a result, the Old Lapau was regarded as one of the first contemporary buildings. It is a one-story, rectangular, concrete structure with a straightforward external and interior design that resembles an extended cottage. It was always worn in white, and that is still the case now. The building's back patio and entryway with its flat roof were still there, but concrete walls had been constructed to enclose the area. The original back patio of the PSB was converted into a segway leading to the main building in the late 1980s, marking the start of expansion and refurbishment operations.

Bruneian architectural characteristics may be found in the Old Lapau's architecture, especially in its roof, which is modeled after the "potong limas" style that was common in Kampong Ayer in the early 1940s. Although the original roof's materials are unclear, it was originally formed like a pyramid with an upside-down V at the peak. Today, Spanish tiles are used on the roof. The structure has five semi-circle arch windows on each side, which were initially open for ventilation, in observance of the Lapau Kajang design. The circulation within the structure was changed, though, when opaque glass was used to block these windows during renovations.

The Old Lapau is currently used as an exhibition gallery. Entering this space offers a glimpse into the building's history even if the verandahs on both wings are now closed up and part of the exhibition area. The room's aged, darkening fans and chandeliers that are mounted to the renovated ceiling. In the middle is a big U-shaped table and leather seats that have been saved from previous gatherings. Old-fashioned microphones, speeches and pronouncements, are perched above the table. A replica of the Pataratna, the ceremonial dais used for Sultan's coronation and other important rituals, such as the announcement of the 1959 Brunei Constitution, is located in the rear of the space. There used to be an office behind the wall in the wall, with a vault that is thought to have held old records and a concealed pillar from the original building. The interior design is a blend of pragmatism and simplicity, with hints of the Melayu Islam Beraja. Whether deliberate or not, the building's use of these subtle, rather than ostentatious, aspects is consistent with its status as a work of national architecture.

== Gallery ==
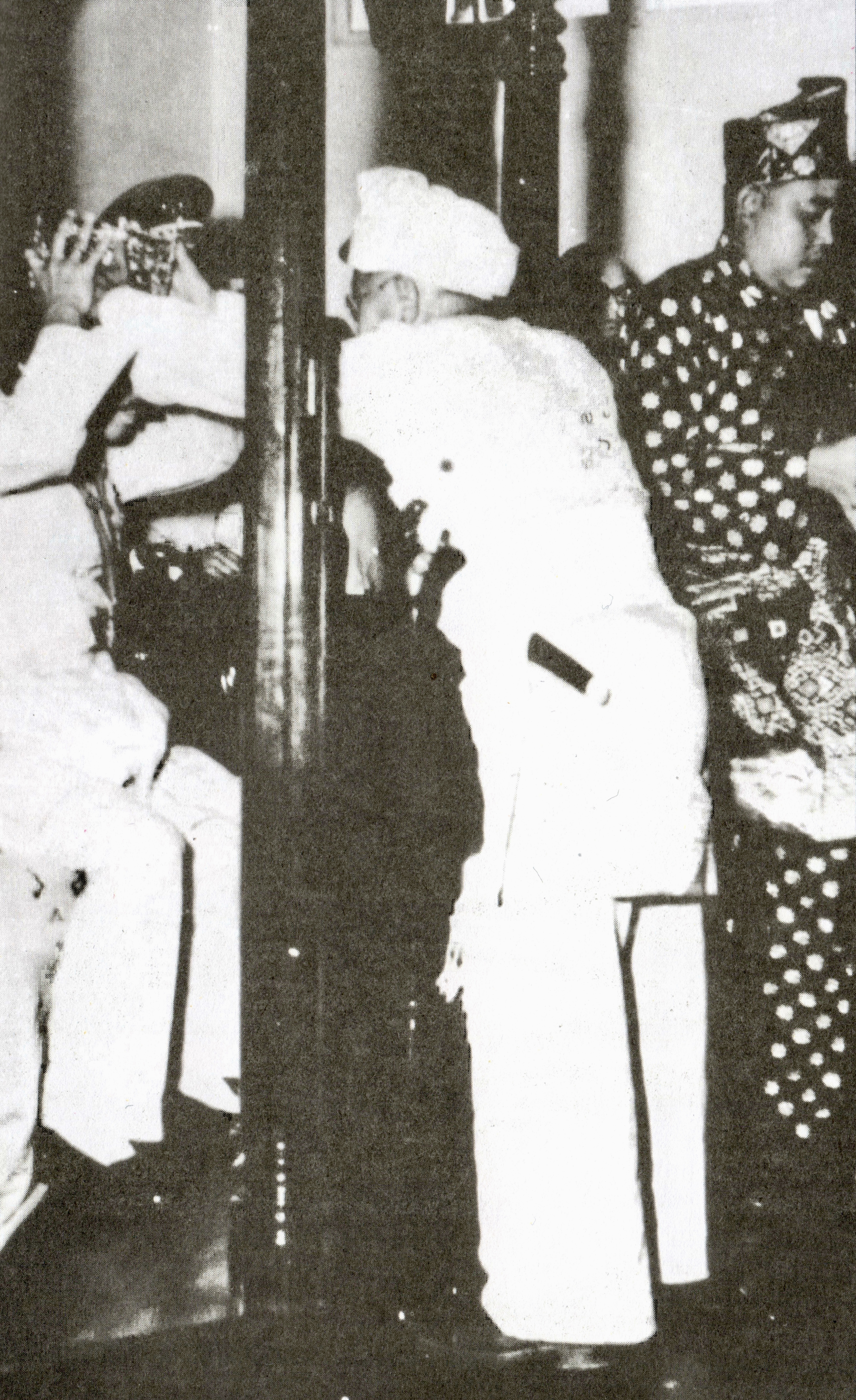
Crowning of the Sultan Omar Ali on 31 May 1950

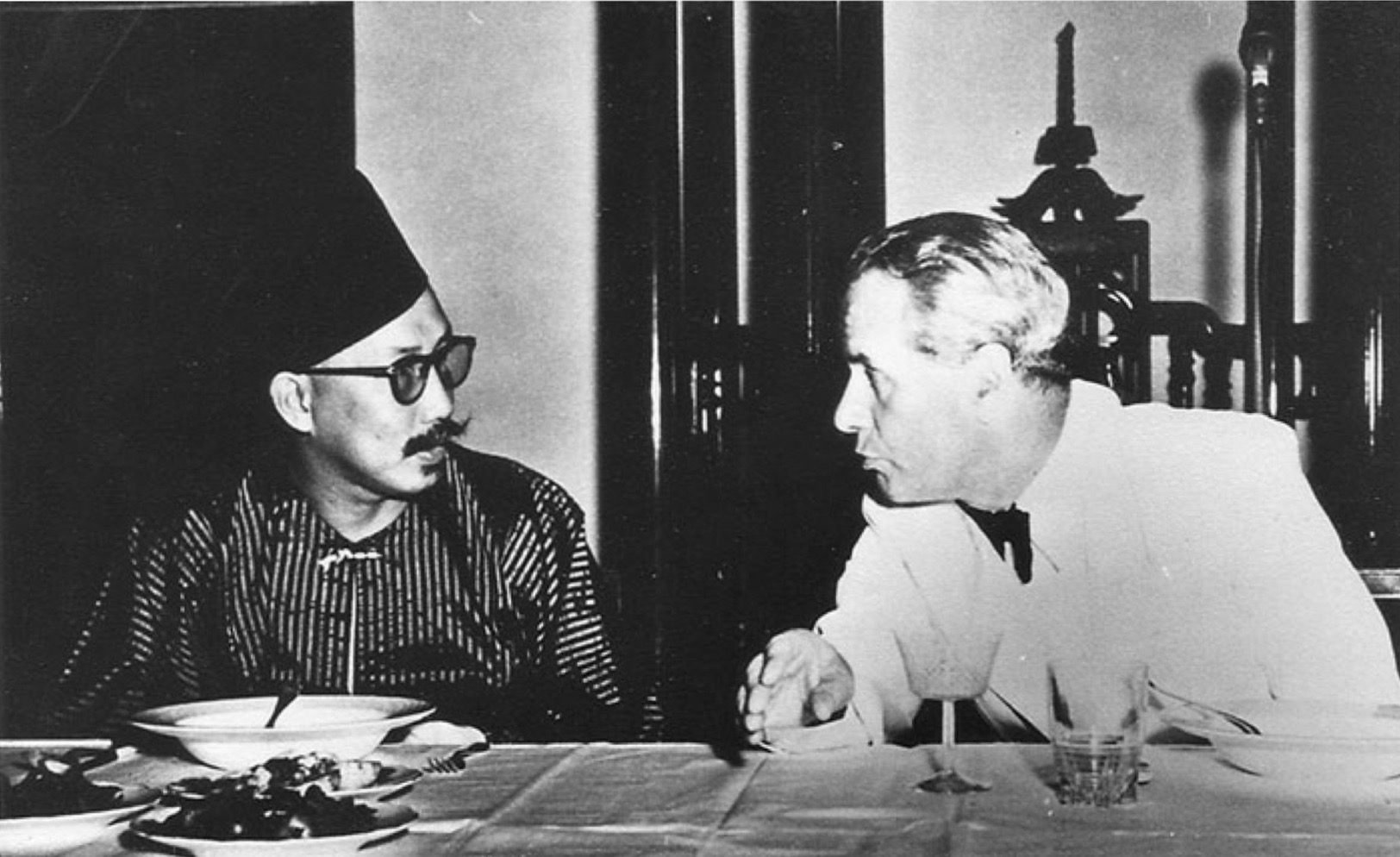
Conversation between MacDonald and Sultan Omar Ali, 1955

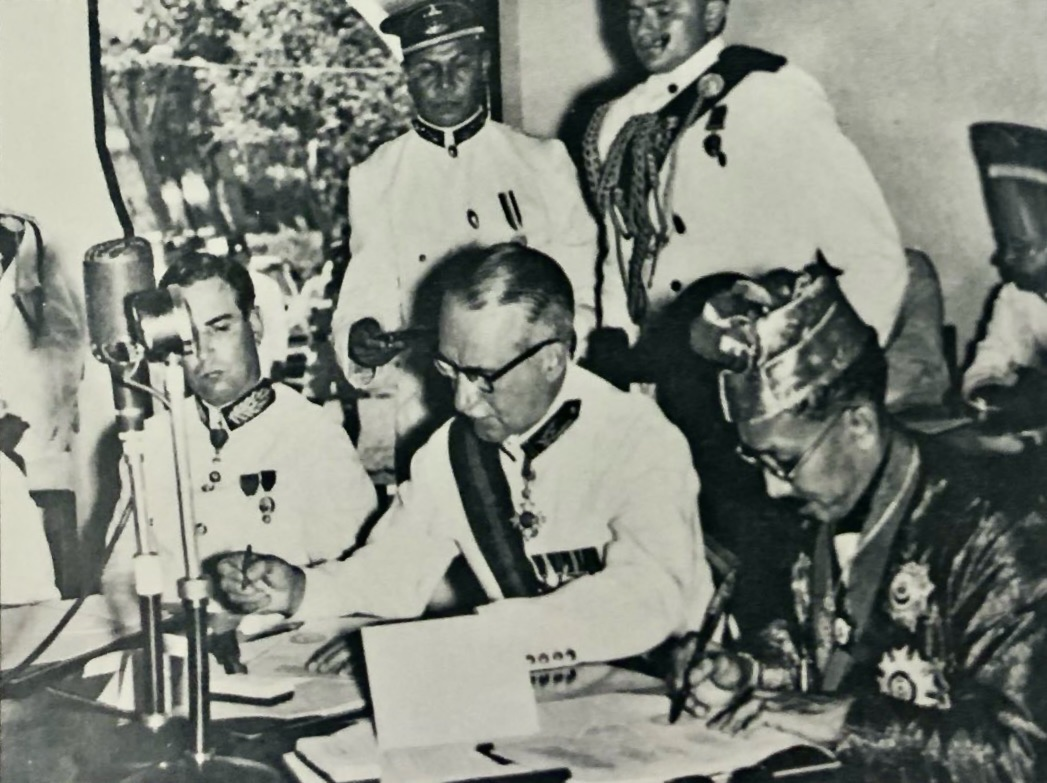
Brunei Agreement and Constitution, signed in 1959 by the Sultan Omar Ali and Sir Robert Heatlie Scott

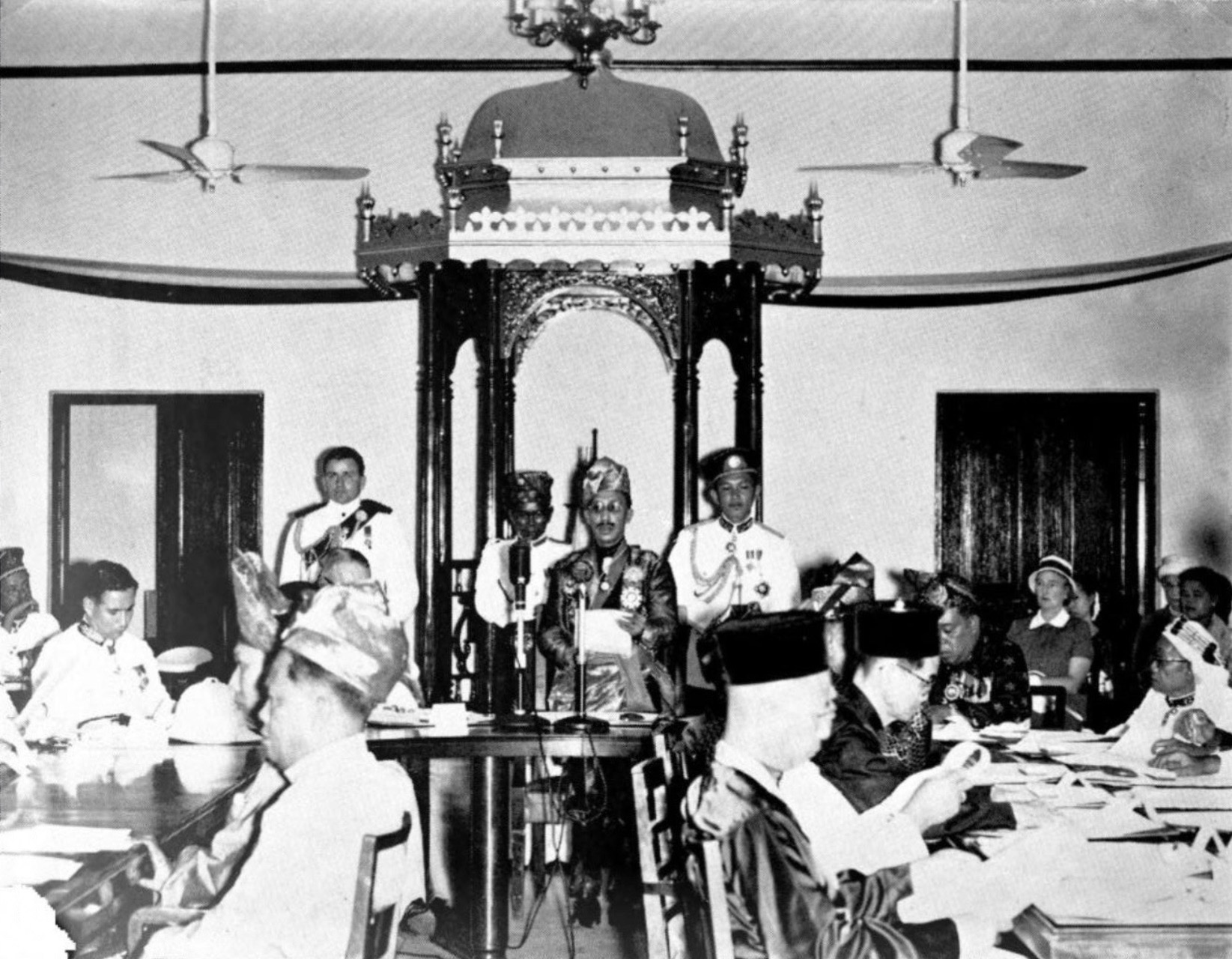
The Sultan giving his titah (speech) after approving the 1959 Brunei Agreement and Constitution.

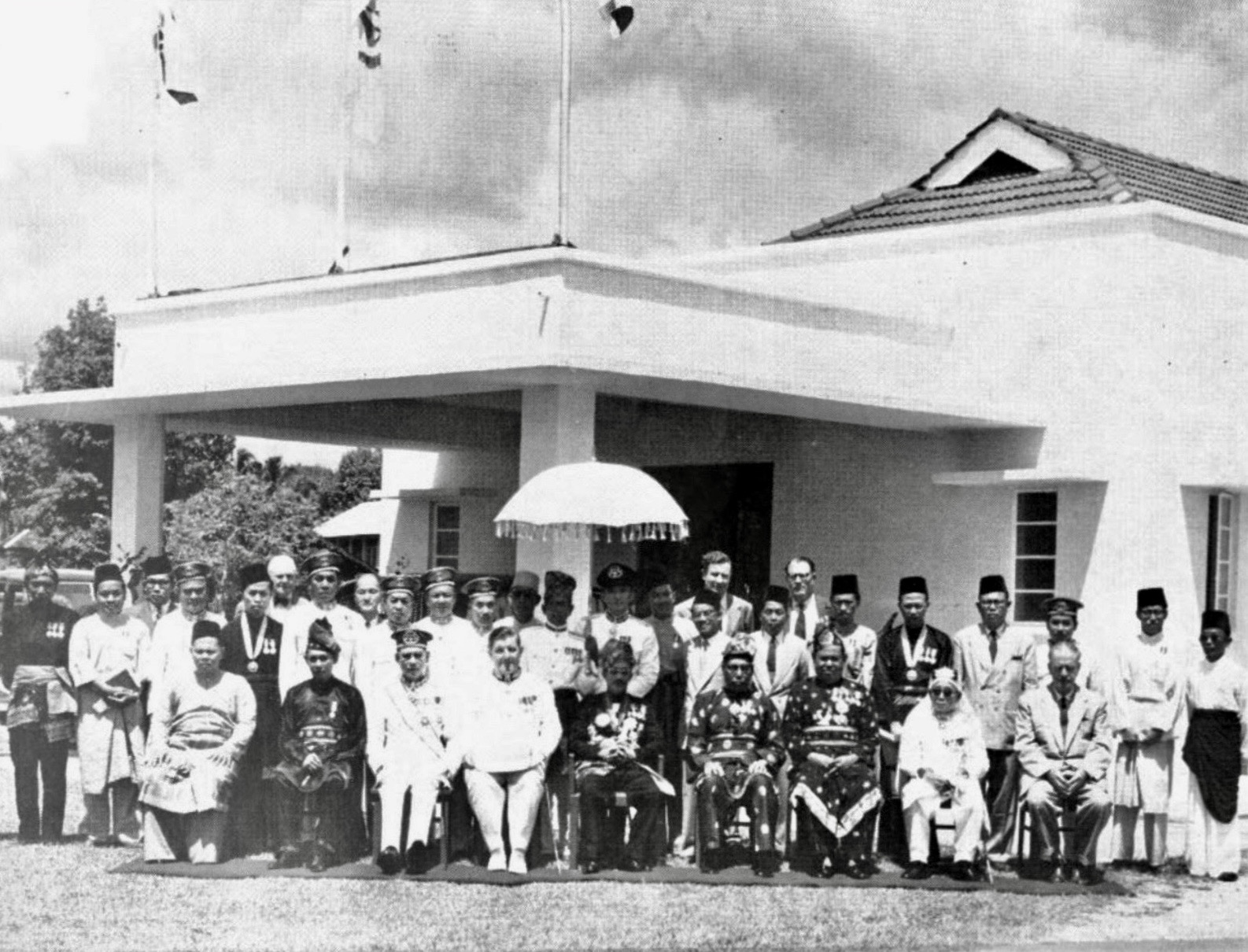
A group photo of the first Legislative Council with the Old Lapau in the background, 1959

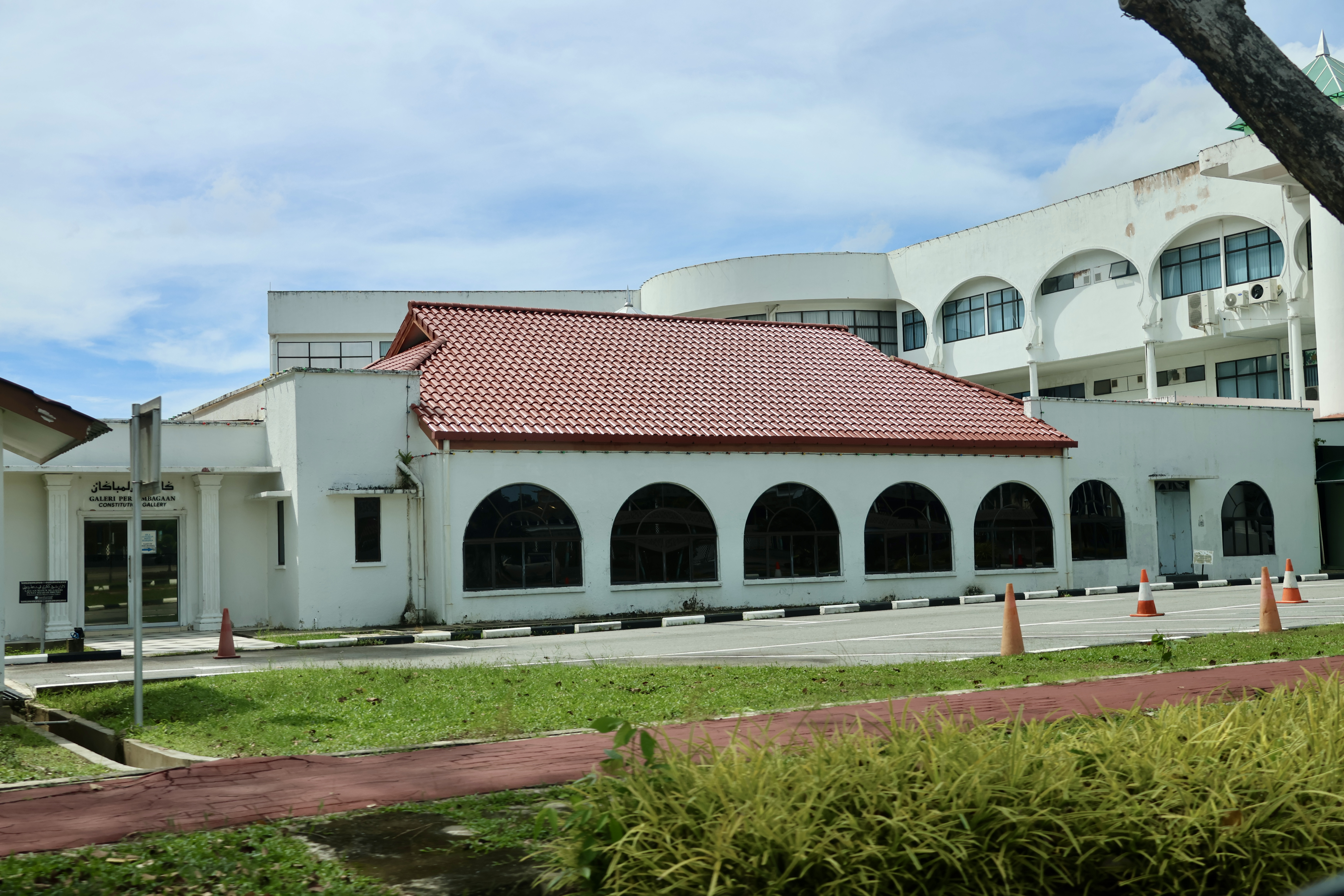
The building as a museum
