= Dermaga Diraja Bandar Seri Begawan =

Waterfront and former wharf in Brunei

Royal Wharf
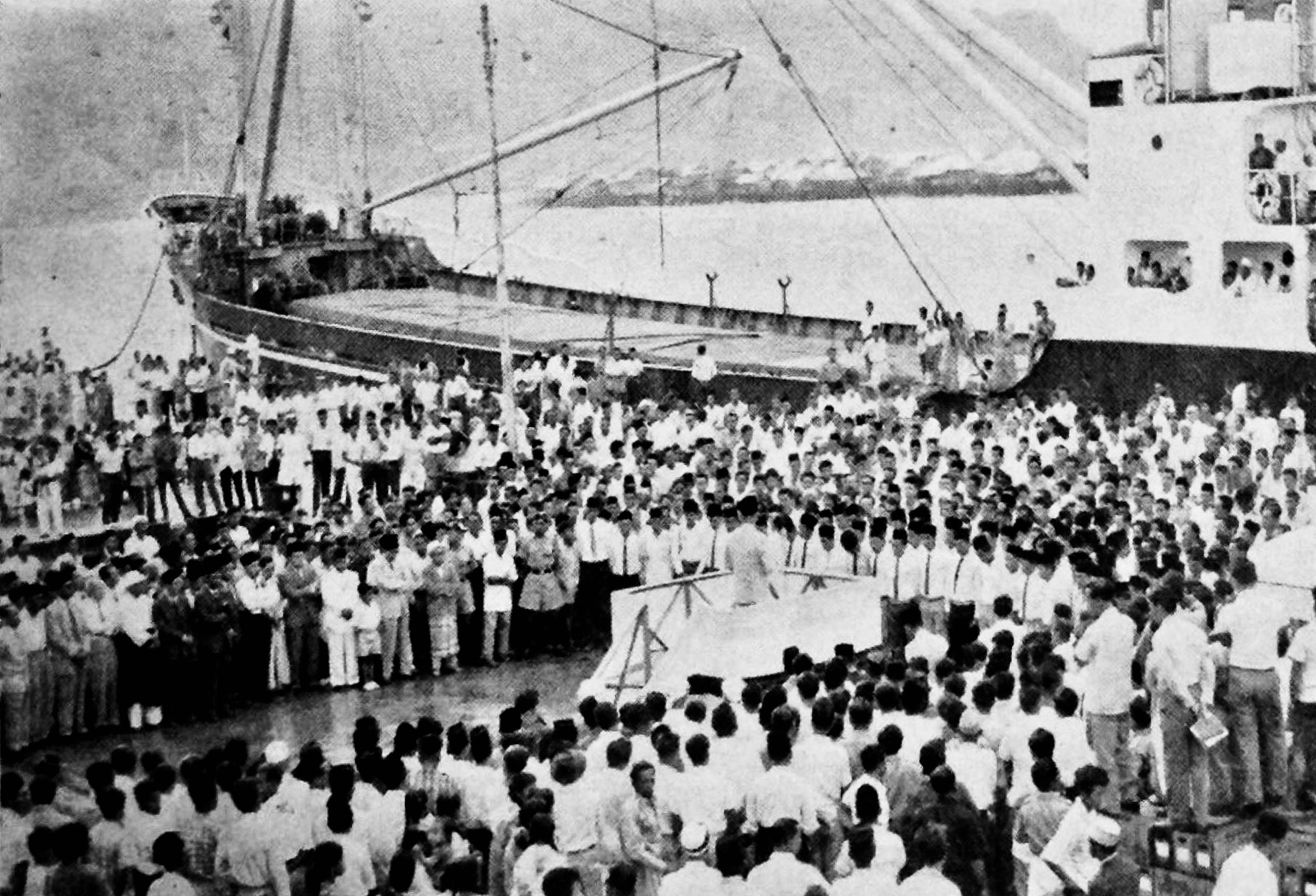
- Brunei Malay Regiment recruits prepare to board a ship at the wharf for Malaya in 1961

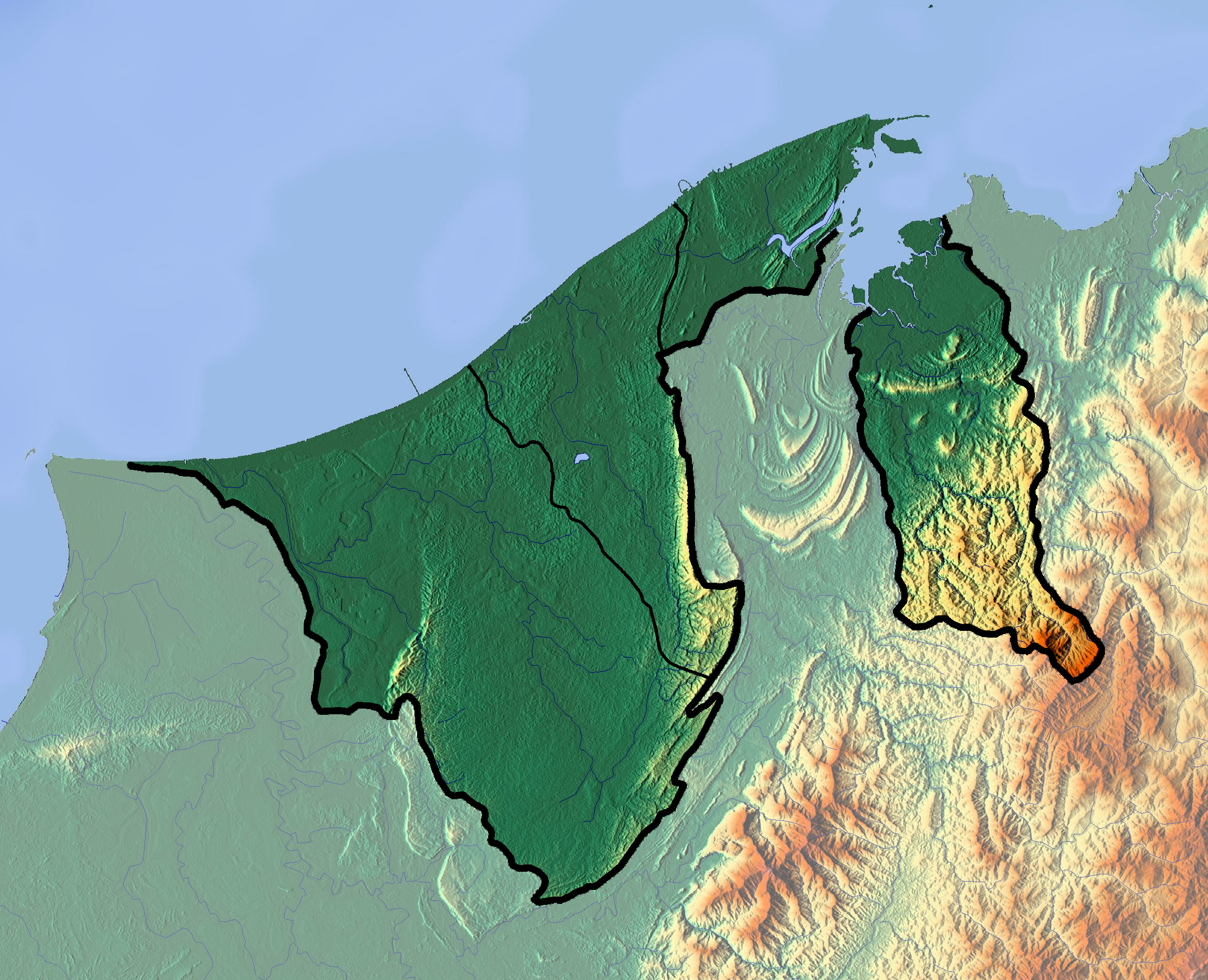
- Location in Brunei

Location
- Country: Brunei
- Location: Bandar Seri Begawan
- Coordinates: 4°53′12″N 114°56′35″E

Details
- Opened: 1919; 106 years ago
- Closed: 1990s
- Operated by: Royal Customs and Excise Department
- Owned by: Government of Brunei
- Type of harbour: river natural
- Land area: 1.8 hectares (4.4 acres)
- Size: 730 feet (220 m)
- Draft depth: 4.9–5.8 metres (16–19 ft)

The Dermaga Diraja Bandar Seri Begawan, (Note: Another spelling of the name is Dermaga Diraja, Bandar Seri Begawan.) simply known as the Royal Wharf (Dermaga Diraja), is a 1.8 hectares (4.4 acres) waterfront site located in Bandar Seri Begawan. Originally known as the Royal Customs and Excise Wharf, it has a rich history as both a port and an entry point for passengers and imported goods arriving by sea. The significance of this wharf, along with the former customs building, lies in its role as a historic gateway to Brunei. This importance was further emphasised with major renovations completed in April 2011, solidifying its status as the primary port of entry for both passengers and cargo. During the early 1950s, trade between Brunei and other countries saw substantial growth, further highlighting the wharf’s crucial role in the nation’s economy.

== Geography ==
The capital, Bandar Seri Begawan (formerly Brunei Town), is located 16 miles (26 km) upriver from Muara Port, near the mouth of the Brunei River. The municipal port at Bandar Seri Begawan accommodates only small wooden coastal vessels, with a maximum length of 80 feet (24 m) and a gross registered tonnage of 50 tonnes (49 long tons; 55 short tons), operating within the Brunei Bay area. The port features a 730-foot reinforced concrete wharf with 4.9–5.8 metres (16–19 ft) depths beside, a 76-foot-wide wharf apron, a 124-foot passenger pier with a 63-foot-wide apron, and three transit godowns. This wharf serves as a key transportation hub connecting Brunei with neighbouring areas such as Temburong District, Limbang, Lawas, and Labuan. Brunei's short, straightforward coastline enhances safety and limits unauthorised crossings, while traditional penambang (water taxi) serve as a primary means of transport, linking coastal settlements along the river.

== History ==
=== Early history ===
The harbour at Kampong Ayer, historically known as Labuhan Kapal, has long been central to Brunei's trade activities. Based on Francisco de Sande's notes from the Spanish naval commander's voyage during the Castilian War in 1578, there is a record of this strategic port serving as a trade hub for the centre of the archipelago. In the 17th century, Kampong Ayer became known for its traditional floating market activity called padian, where women, identifiable by their distinctive large semicircular hats called saraung bini, rowed through the village in sampans. They traded goods such as fruits, vegetables, fish, and kuih, sourced from inland residents and fishermen. Certain areas, including Kampong Lurong Sikuna, were also key berthing locations for British ships, locally known as "schooners."

=== 20th century ===
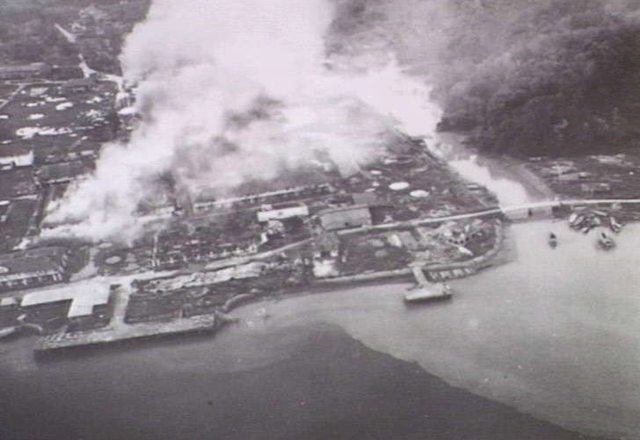
Aerial photograph of the wharf under Allied bombing in 1945

By 1906, British Resident McArthur introduced administrative reforms, including regulated duties for ships trading in Brunei. Customs Department's records reveal that the first customs office was established at Kampong Pekan Lama, previously known as Kampong Bakut China, a commercial hub on a sandbank in the heart of Kampong Ayer. While early records mention a jetty built near the residency, named Bubungan Dua Belas, the first substantial customs wharf likely emerged in 1908 when the Public Works Department allocated funds for a customs house and wharf near the gathering points of padians and pengalus. (Note: Pengalu refers to merchants who served as middlemen, using a barter trade system to buy agricultural and forest products from people living inland.) By 1910, the customs house was connected by telephone to the residency, and by 1916, repairs to the customs wharf and shed had begun. A new customs house store and wharf were completed in 1919, while the old customs house was converted into a marketplace. The wharf's jetty was fully operational by 1922, hosting significant visitors such as the Prince of Wales, who was received at the jetty on 18 May 1922, following a tour of the Brunei River. World War II aerial photographs showed the wharf to be 200 feet (61 m) long, connected to the mainland by three gangways.

The wharf on the banks of the Brunei River has a significant history. Initially used to offload necessities, it became a key point for trade. In 1951, Sultan Omar Ali Saifuddien III departed from the wharf to make the Hajj pilgrimage to Mecca. By 1953, the wharf was extended from 200 to 400 feet (61 to 122 m) to accommodate the growing demands of traders, as the original ports at Kampong Lorong Sikuna and Lorong Dalam could no longer handle the increasing traffic. Although the space between the wharf and its surroundings remained unimproved, the customs building, designed in Victorian architectural style, was completed in the same year. In 1958, the site was officially closed to the public and renamed the Royal Customs and Excise Wharf, becoming a bustling hub for both people and cargo.

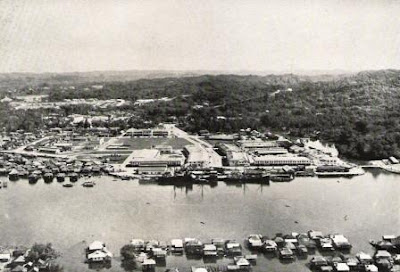
Ships docked at the wharf in 1956

With the rise in shipping activity, the government faced a decision in 1958: to dredge the Brunei River to accommodate larger ships or to construct a deep-water port in Muara. By 1956, the Royal Customs and Excise Building was completed, and became the focal point of the fenced-off wharf. Major shipping companies, such as Harrisons & Crosfield and Brunei Lighterage Limited, managed vessels like the Perak, Lipis, Rajah Brooke, and MV Maimunah. Despite this, the shallow Brunei River posed significant challenges as ships grew in size. Many vessels had to anchor at Sapo Point in Brunei Bay and transfer goods to the mainland using barges. By 1958, the decision was made to build a deep-water port at Muara rather than continue dredging the river.

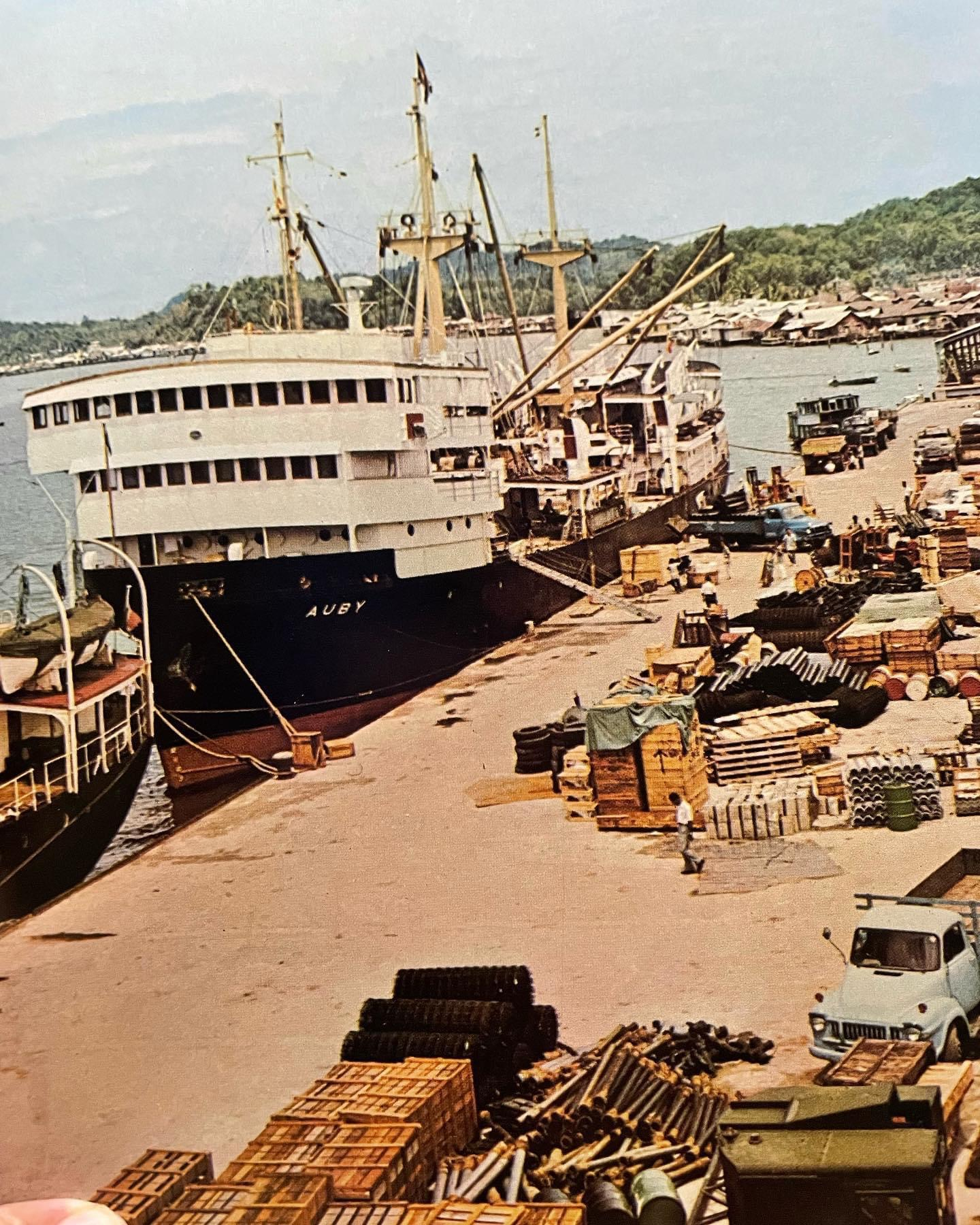
Auby moored at the wharf in 1968

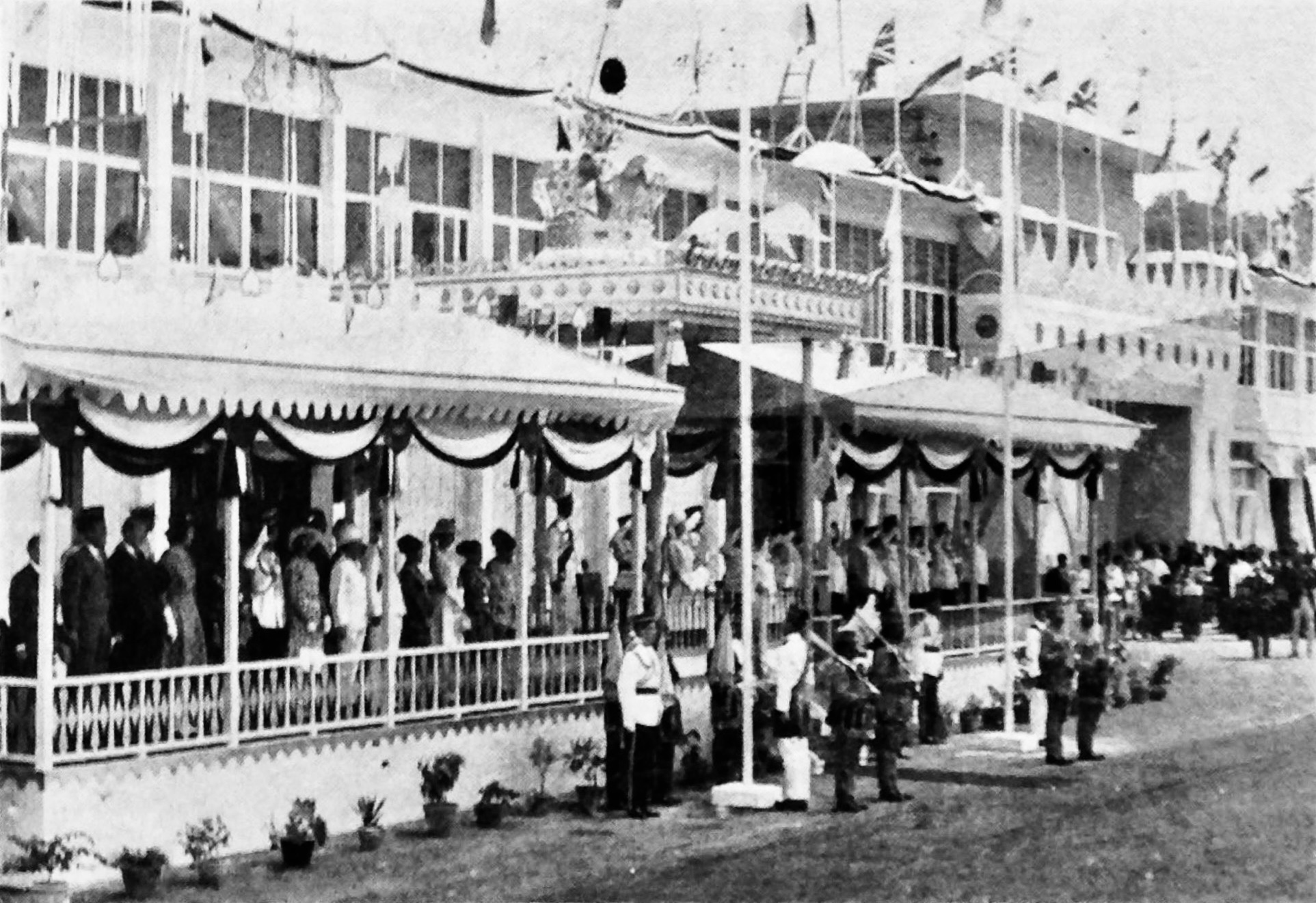
Hassanal Bolkiah and his dignitaries at the welcoming ceremony for the arrival of Elizabeth II and her entourage at the wharf in 1972

In 1968, the distance between the wharf and the main road was improved and extended, contributing to the port's growth. However, by the 1960s, it became clear that the Brunei River could no longer accommodate large, heavy ships in the long term due to technical limitations. As a result, the government decided to construct a deep-water port in Muara. This decision culminated in the official opening of Muara Port by Queen Elizabeth II on 21 February 1972, marking the end of the old trade port and beginning a new era for the introduction of commercial goods.

Despite the shift to Muara Port, the original dock continued to be used by local traders, such as the padians and water taxis, until the end of 1987. Throughout the 1980s and into the late 1990s, it also functioned as a bustling market for vegetables and seafood. Until January 1997, passengers from Labuan and Lawas underwent immigration checks at a checkpoint located at the right corner of the pier, (Note: In contrast to Brunei's stringent Islamic laws, the wharf makes it easier for locals and visitors to travel across the border, giving Bruneians access to neighboring Malaysian towns for leisure, shopping, and pleasure. This movement emphasises how important cultural distinctions between Brunei and Malaysia are to cross-border travel.) prior to the opening of the Marine Department's Serasa Ferry Terminal in Muara. In the late 1990s, the Government Rest House, which had previously housed the Information Department, was demolished. The Bandar Seri Begawan Municipal Department then took control of the Royal Customs and Excise Wharf property, converting it into a public parking lot. In 1998, Bandar Seri Begawan underwent significant redevelopment, transforming its historic waterfront by adding a large shopping centre and an underground car park, reflecting the country's efforts to balance modernisation with the preservation of its cultural, religious, and environmental heritage.

=== 21st century ===
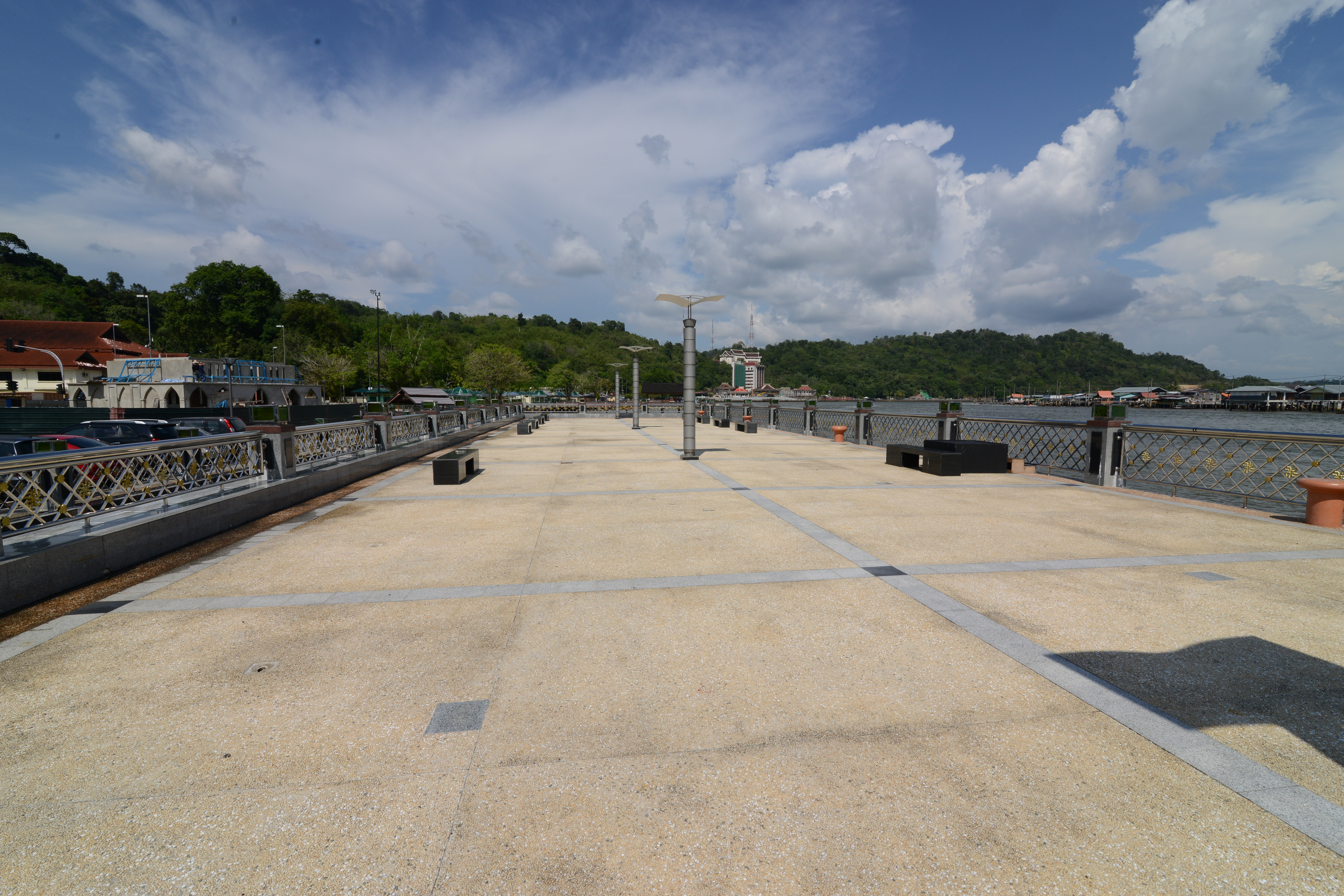
The wharf still undergoing renovation in 2014

The Bandar Seri Begawan Waterfront Construction Project, launched by the Brunei government to boost the tourism sector and support the Wawasan Brunei 2035 initiative, began in 2008. The project, located across from Kampong Ayer on the site of the former Royal Customs and Excise Building, was part of the Bandar Seri Begawan and Gadong Improvement Area Plan 1988 and the Bandar Seri Begawan Development Master Plan 2011. The redevelopment, with a total budget of B$5.6 million, was completed in three phases under the 2007–2012 National Development Plan. The first phase, which focused on strengthening the mooring structure, began on 9 August 2008 and ended on 13 November 2009, costing $1,160,113.79. The second phase, which included landscaping, engineering, and mechanical work, ran from 14 November 2009 to 13 November 2010 at a cost of $3,311,835. The final phase, with $1.1 million allocated for amenities like benches, kiosks, and waste management systems, was dedicated to enhancing public infrastructure for the comfort and safety of visitors.

The former Royal Customs and Excise Building, safeguarded under the Antiquities and Treasure Trove Act by 2006 due to its historical significance, is now a heritage site. "Waterfront, Bandar Seri Begawan" was built between 2010 and 2011. The structure is made of concrete, tiles, and steel. It was officially opened on Saturday, 28 May 2011, by Crown Prince Al-Muhtadee Billah. Revived in 2012 after extensive renovations, the Berjanuari boat race, underscores the wharf's historical and cultural significance. It was officially renamed "Dermaga Diraja Bandar Seri Begawan" on 1 January 2013, following a royal decree from Sultan Hassanal Bolkiah. In the same year, during the Brunei Regatta, the Sultan signed the BSB Royal Wharf Plaque, further emphasising the waterfront's role in the nation's heritage. In March 2017, the Bandar Seri Begawan Master Plan was presented to the 13th Legislative Council, highlighting the revitalisation of the waterfront along the Brunei River as part of broader national infrastructure initiatives, despite fiscal challenges in the 2017–2018 budget.

== Places of interest ==
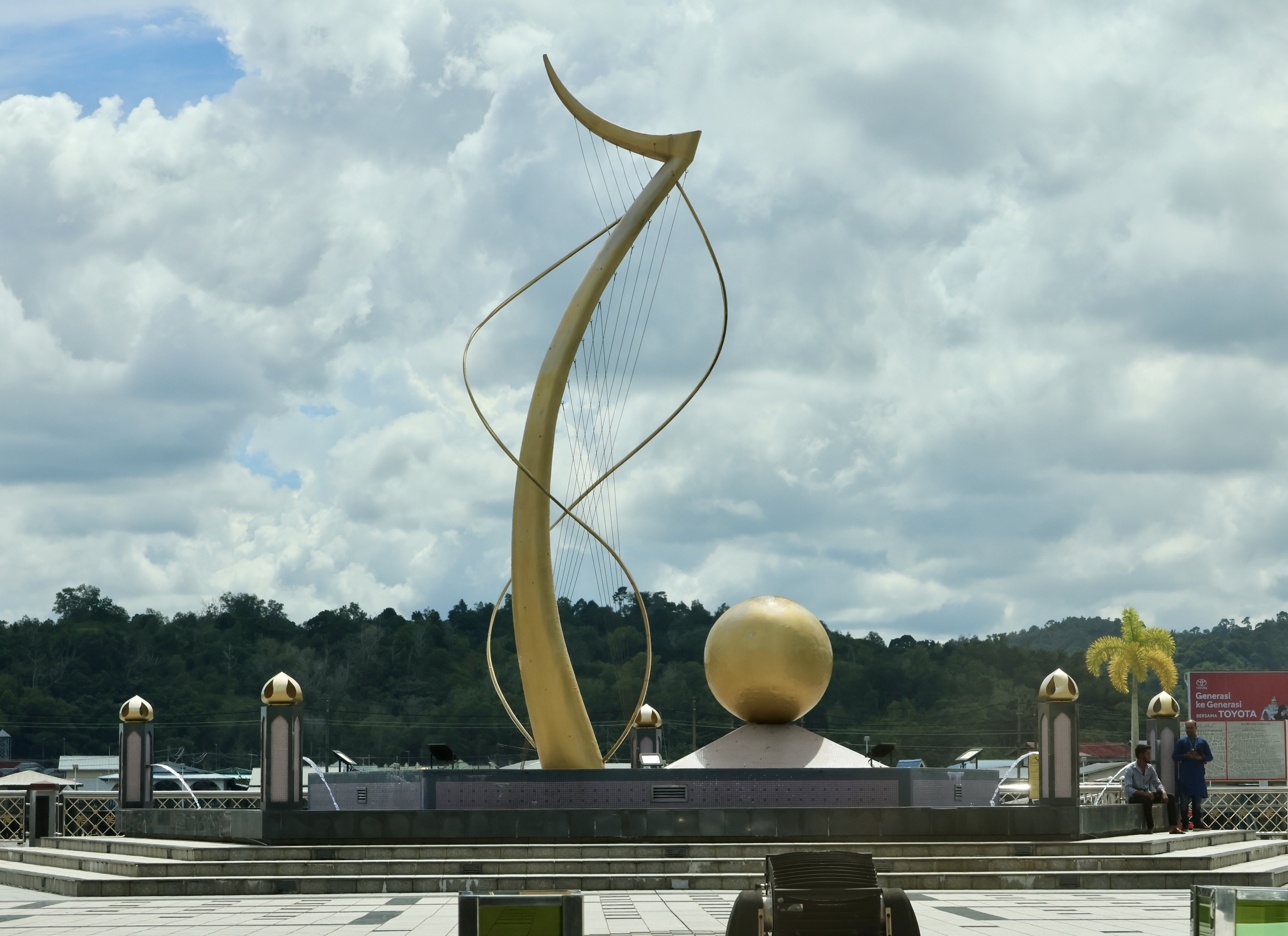
Mercu Dirgahayu 60 in 2022

The Brunei Energy Hub, formerly the Royal Customs and Excise Building, is a museum and art gallery, inaugurated by Sultan Hassanal Bolkiah on 23 October 2022. It has four exhibition halls, three of which are dedicated to the history, present state, and prospects of the nation's oil and gas industry. The fourth is a temporary art gallery that supports the local creative sector. Along with local art exhibits, visitors may discover Brunei's oil and gas history, present, and future through interactive displays and augmented reality experiences.

The Mercu Dirgahayu 60, a golden fountain monument to honour of Sultan Hassanal Bolkiah's 60th birthday, built in Bandar Seri Begawan in 2006. Located where the Immigration Post Control once stood, Cendera Kenangan Kekal offers a commanding view of Kampong Ayer, Brunei's historic water hamlet. As a token of gratitude and respect for the sultan, the people of Brunei–Muara District erected this monument. Adanan Yusof presided over the foundation-laying ceremony, and the building was finished by May 2007. The monument features a distinctive design with a tall bent column that forms the Jawi numeral 60 when illuminated at night, creating a notable landmark along the capital's shoreline.

== Gallery ==
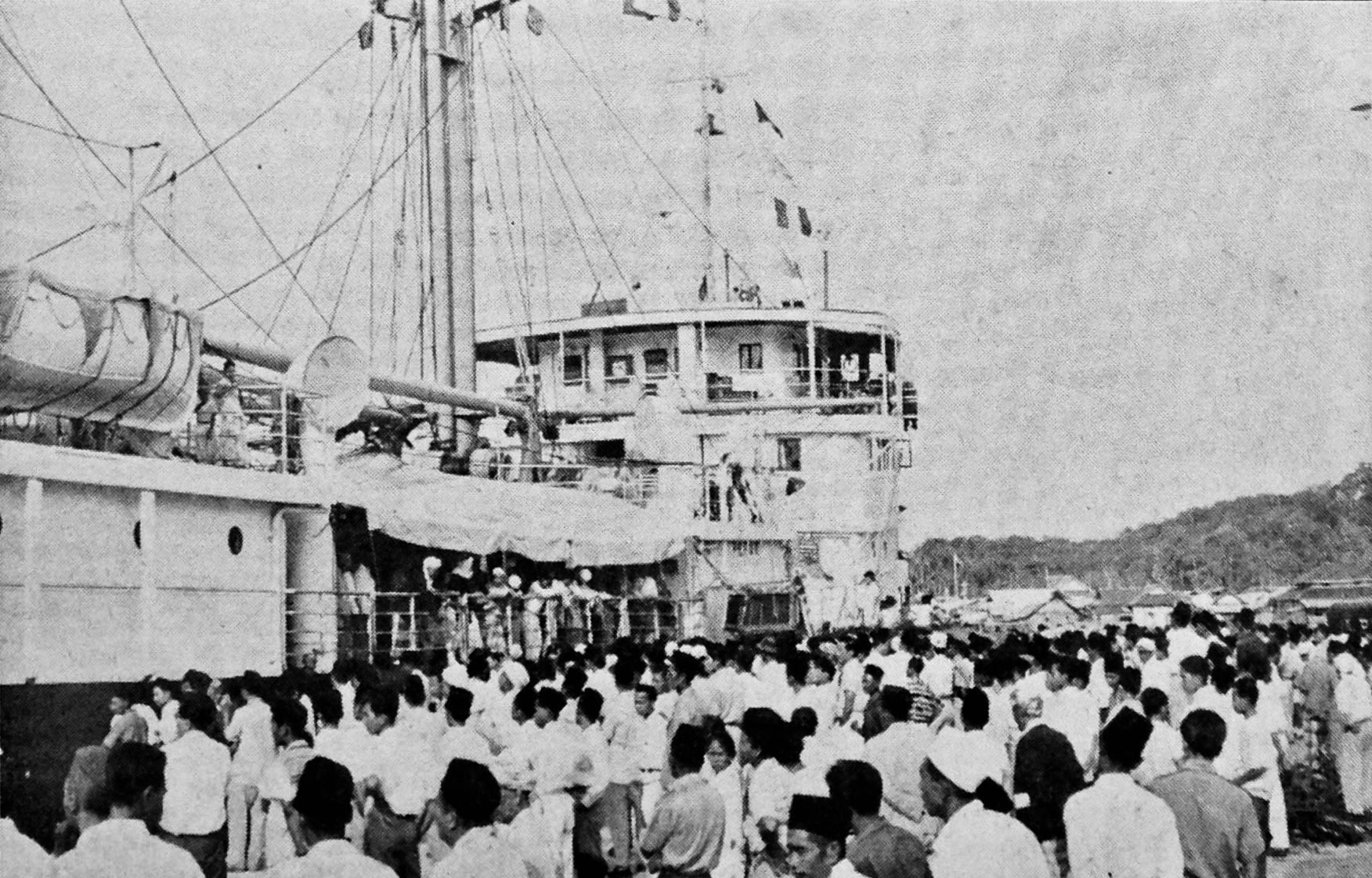
Bruneian pilgrims to Mecca boarding the Perlis in 1959

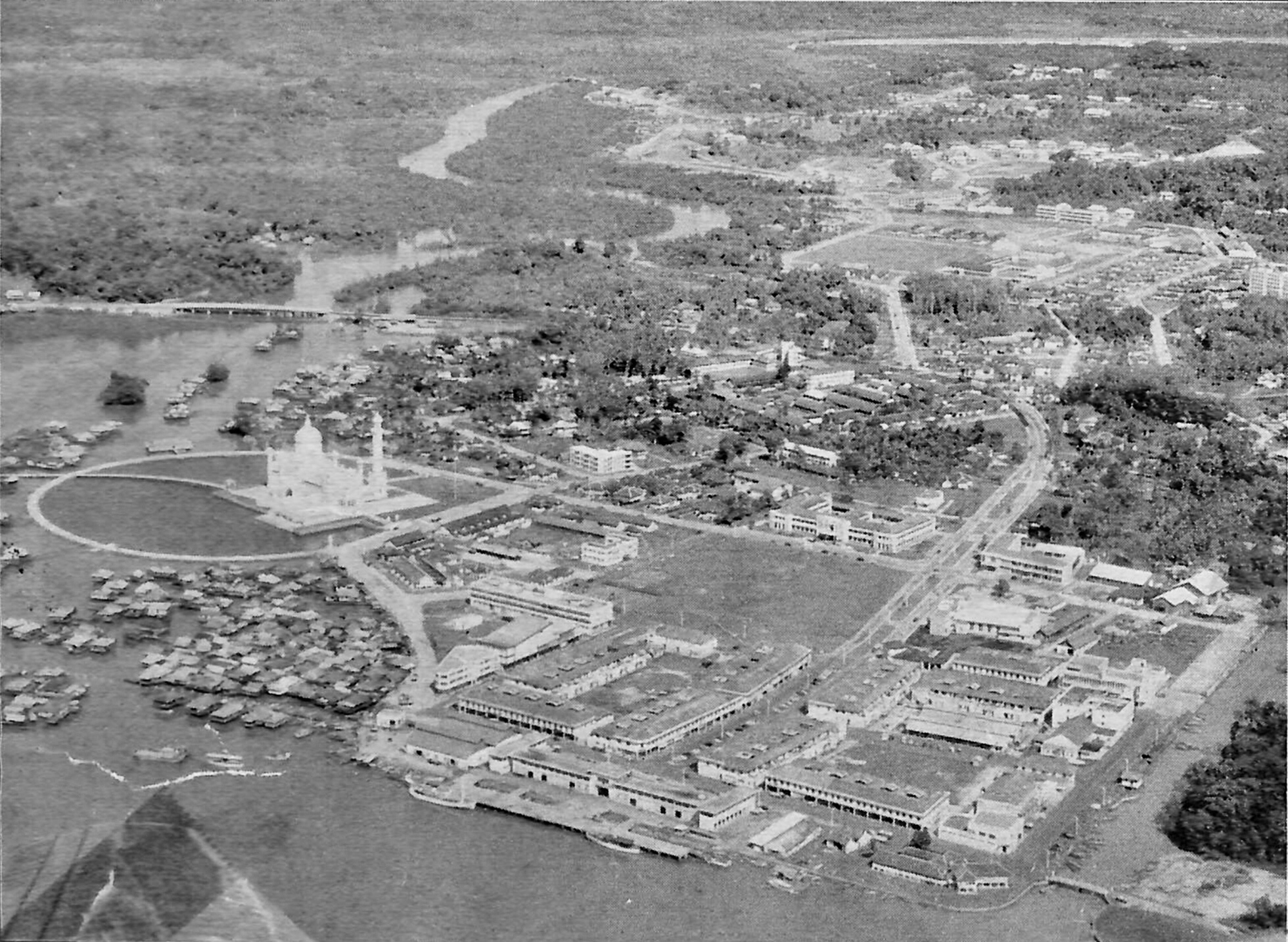
The wharf (foreground) and the city centre in c. 1960

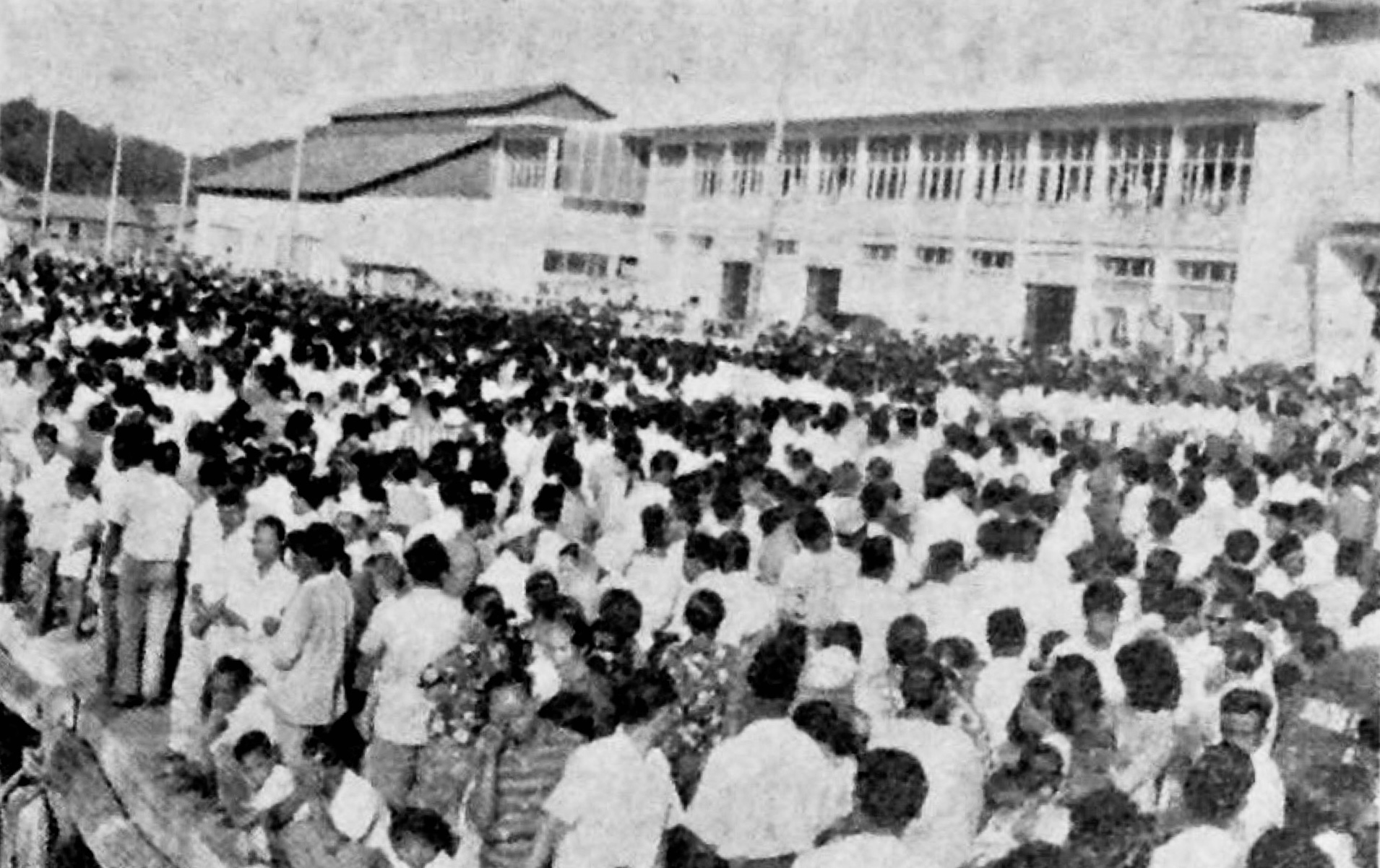
Bruneian recruits preparing to board a ship for Labuan in 1961

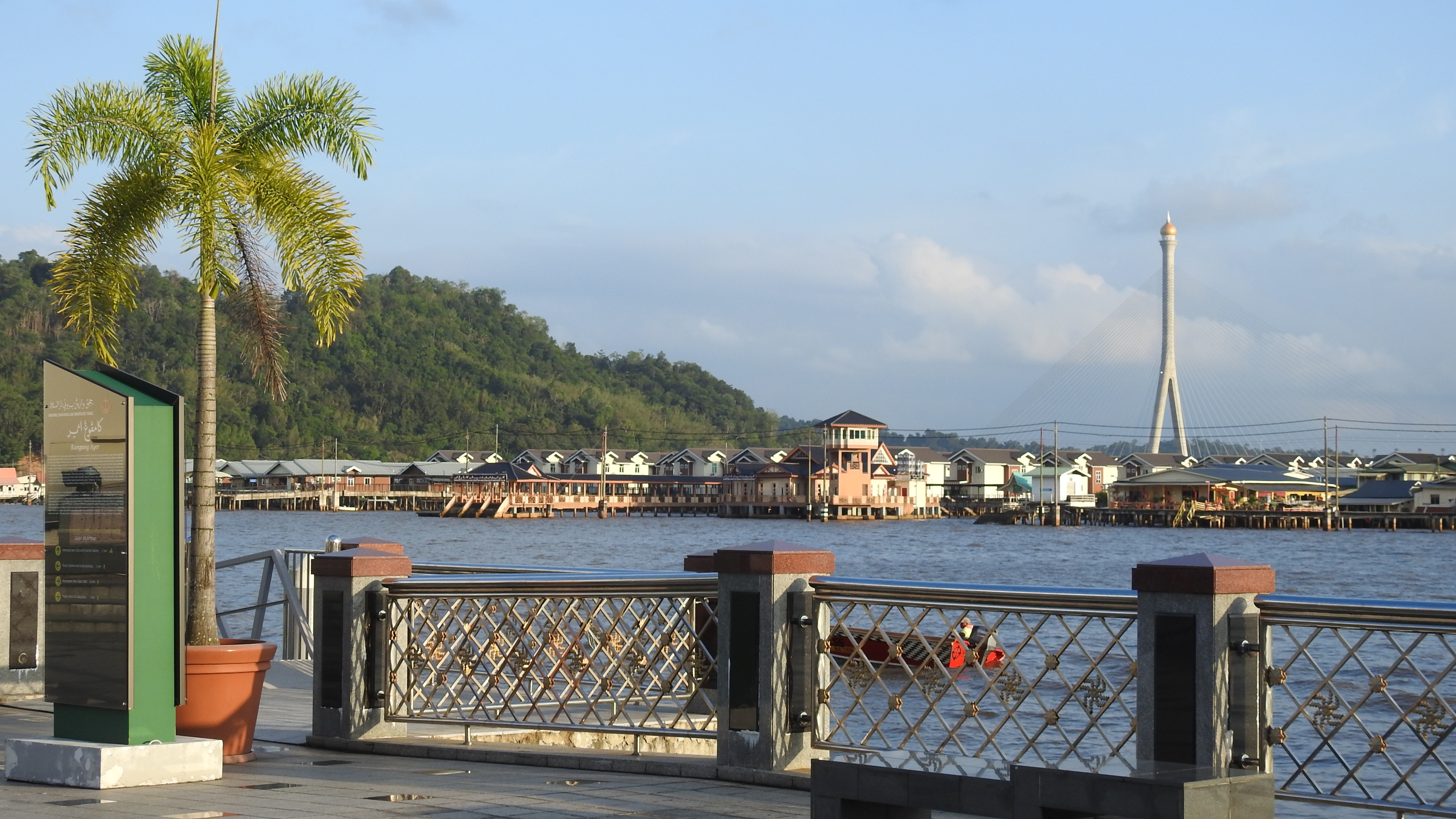
Kampong Ayer seen from the wharf in 2018

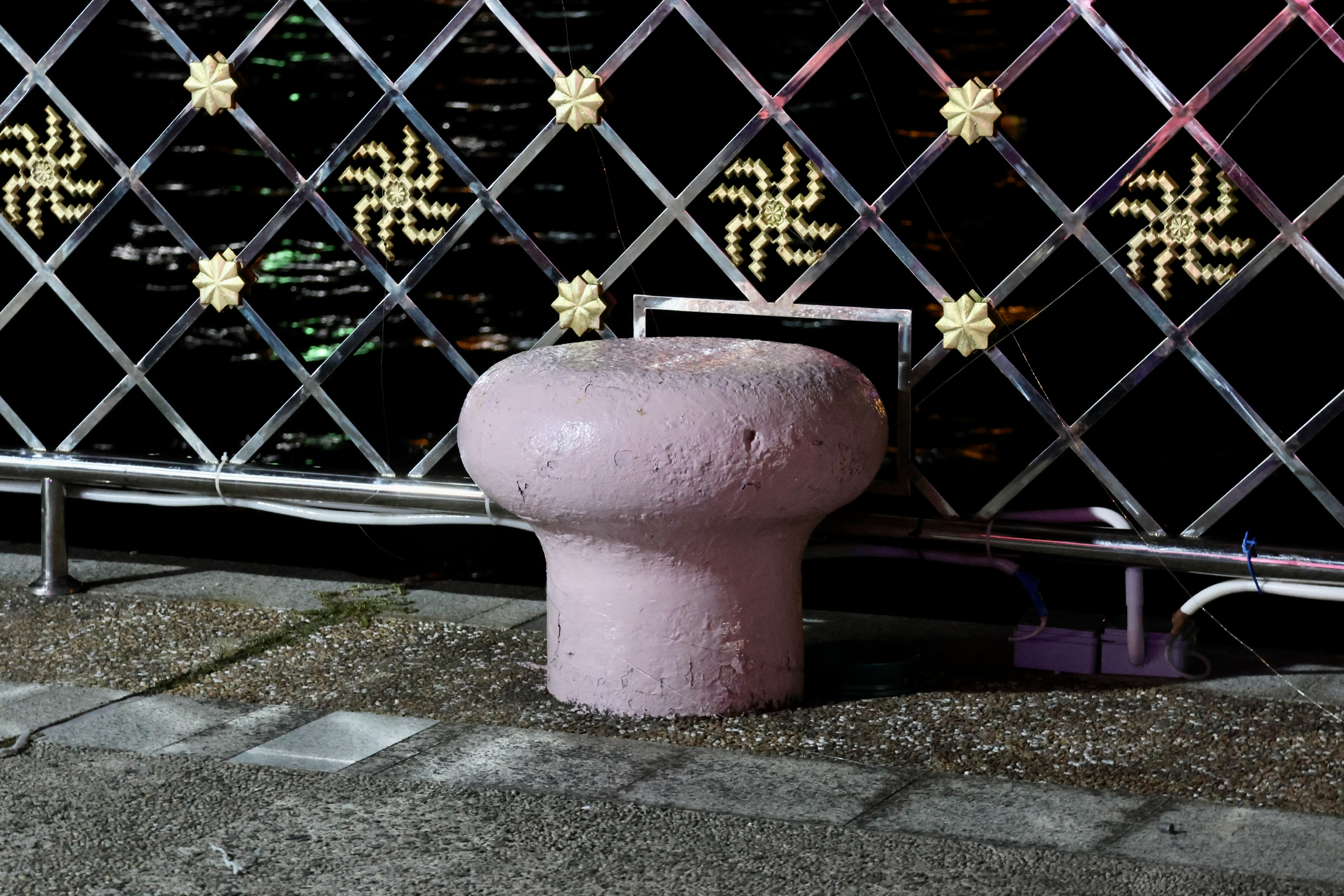
A mooring bollard pictured at the wharf in 2022

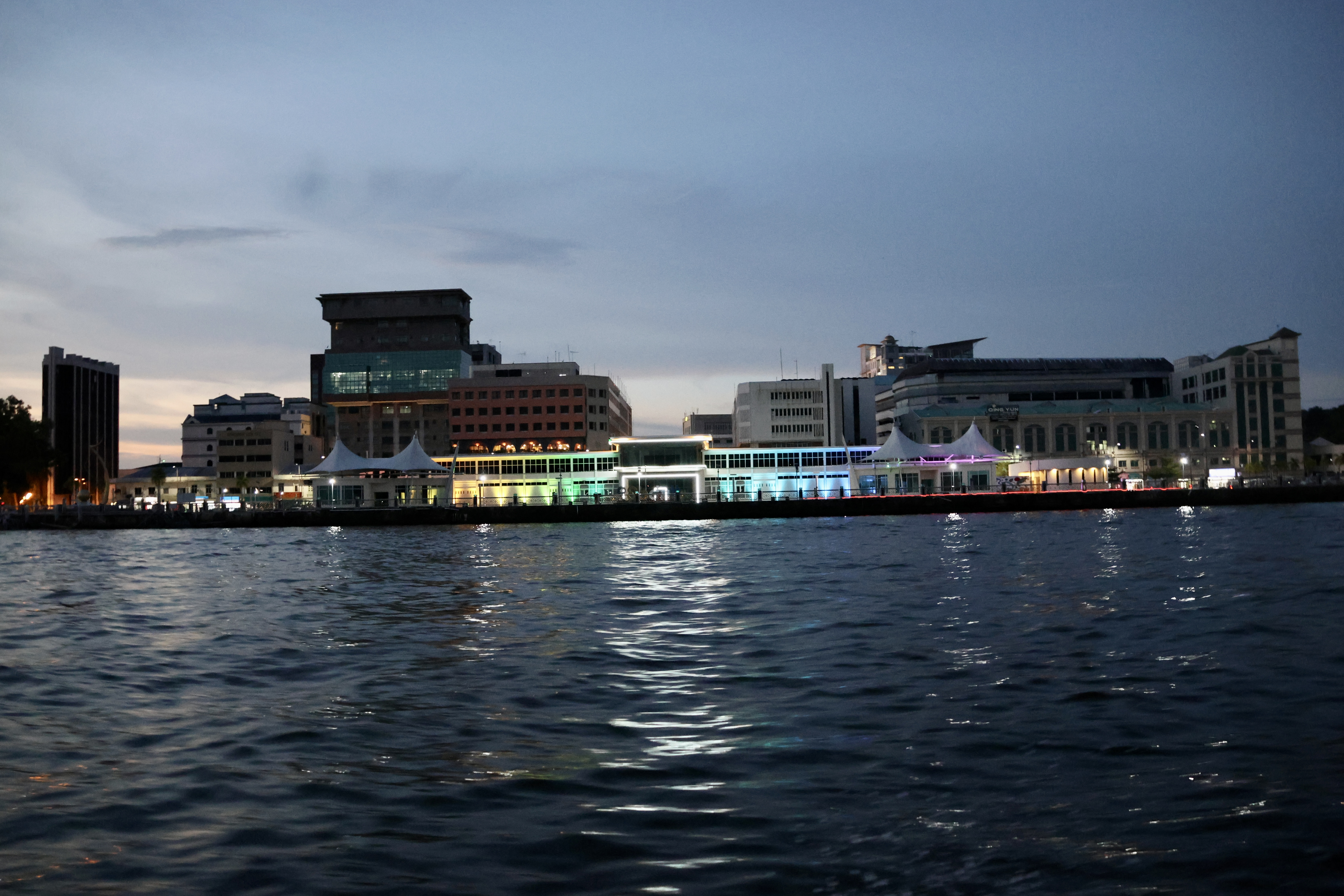
The Brunei Energy Hub and wharf seem from the Brunei River at dusk in 2023
