= Brunei Energy Hub =

Museum in Brunei

- Hab Tenaga Brunei
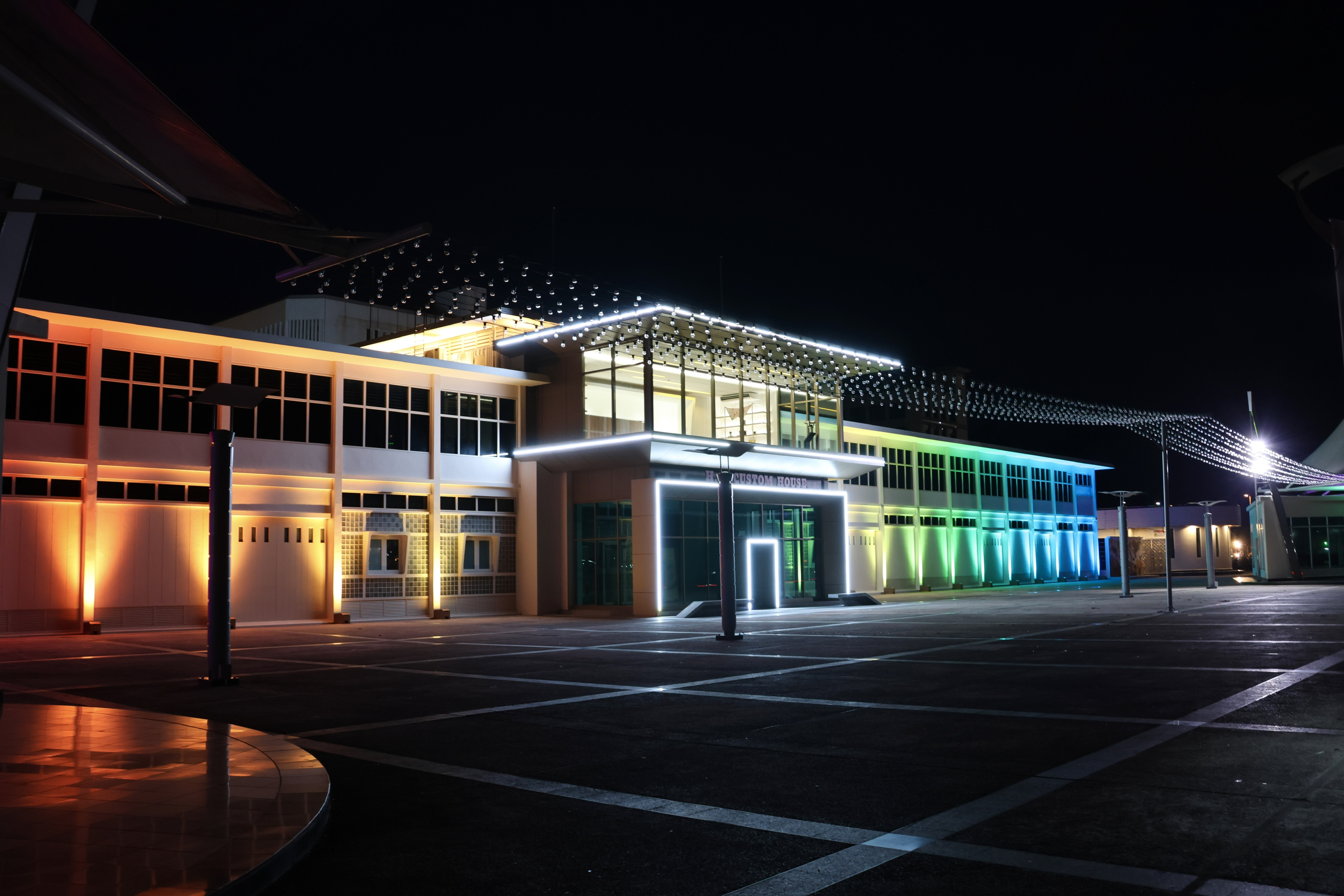
- Brunei Energy Hub at night in 2022
- Established: 23 October 2022
- Location: Dermaga Diraja, Bandar Seri Begawan, Brunei
- Coordinates: 4°53′13″N 114°56′35″E
- Type: Historical and art museum
- Collections: History; Technology; Art
- Visitors: 2,800 (2022)
- Owner: Government of Brunei
- Nearest parking: On site (no charge)
- Website: museums.gov.bn

Brunei Energy Hub Dermaga Diraja (Malay: Hab Tenaga Brunei Dermaga Diraja) or Brunei Energy Hub in short, is a gallery and museum located in Pusat Bandar of Bandar Seri Begawan. It was originally initiated in 1952 and completed in 1956 as the Royal Customs and Excise Building, a wharf for administrative purposes. Over time, its function has evolved to showcase historical and economic significance of Brunei's energy sector while preserving its blend of colonial and constructivist architectural styles.

The renovation project, which was entirely sponsored by Brunei Shell Petroleum (BSP), has been transformed into Brunei–Muara District's interactive oil and gas museum. It is located at the Dermaga Diraja Bandar Seri Begawan and has the Raja Isteri Pengiran Anak Hajah Saleha Bridge as a backdrop, seeks to act as a knowledge centre for the oil and gas sector and a venue to encourage the growth of Brunei's artistic scene.

== History ==
One of the country's oldest government agencies is the Customs Department (present day Royal Customs and Excise Department), which was founded in the early 1900s to oversee the import and export of products under the authority of British Residents. Built at the end of Jalan Sultan between the 1920s and 1930s, the original wharf was mostly composed of wood and lanting (pontoon). An essential first step in stabilising Brunei's infrastructure, social growth, and economy was the establishment of the department. Plans to extend the customs wharf started in the middle of the 1950s, and by 1956, a new, bigger facility next to Jalan McArthur had been built.

Given that it allowed ships to dock and made it easier to load and unload cargo, the wharf was important to Brunei's commercial activity. The importance of the customs facility steadily diminished when Muara Port was created and inaugurated in 1972 in response to Brunei's growing demands. The department relocated to a new location by 1998, leaving the former structure empty. In the end, it was designated as a historical monument and used as a visitor center, cafés, and an art gallery.

The structure was converted into an art gallery in 2007 and included to the waterfront and Dirgahayu 60 Monument after it was gazetted in 2006 under the Antiquities and Treasure Trove Act. The building was turned over to the Public Works Department on 1 December 2019 as the project executor for renovations to transform it into an interactive oil and gas museum. On 5 May 2021, it was officially announced that the building would become a new oil and gas exhibition hall. It would then serve as the location for the official introduction of the Brunei Energy Hub Dermaga Diraja by Sultan Hassanal Bolkiah on 23 October 2022. Approximately two weeks since its opening, the hub has accumulated over 2800 visits.

== Exhibits ==
The hub contains information regarding the oil and gas sector in the country. It has a canteen, a gift shop, an observation deck, and four exhibition halls. The fourth gallery is organised by the Museums Department of the Ministry of Culture, Youth, and Sports, whereas the first three galleries are organised by BSP. It includes:

- Our Past: Footsteps in Time (Masa Lalu Kita: Menjejaki Masa) – The first gallery presents the development of oil and gas in the country and the Bruneian way of life up until the first oil wells were explored in 1899, along with the effects this had on the economy of both the nation and the entire globe. Discover the origin of everything in the 180-degree projection room.
- Our Present: The Nation's Aspiration (Masa Kini Kita: Hasrat Negara) – The second gallery showcases the nation's current oil and gas business, including the industry's value chain and support infrastructure. You may learn more about the sector and how Brunei satisfies the world's oil and gas demands through interactive walls and stations.
- Our Future: Our Eyes on Tomorrow (Masa Hadapan Kita: Pandangan Masa Hadapan Kita) – The future of Brunei's oil and gas sector is highlighted in the third gallery. With the use of Augmented Reality (AR) tablets and entertaining interactive stations, learn how new technologies are changing the business world so that it is more sustainable and environmentally friendly.
- Art Gallery (Galeri Seni) – The fourth gallery functions as a temporary art gallery for the local creative sector to display their works in an effort to assist the growth of the creative industry in Brunei. The audience will be able to see the creations of local artists through the presentation of sculptures, photos, paintings, and other framed and hanging works of art.

== Design and features ==
When it was finished in 1956, the old Royal Customs and Excise Building was intended to be a two-story concrete building that was 400 feet (120 m) long and 30 feet (9.1 m) wide. It was constructed by the Sino-Malayan Engineer, who was also in charge of Omar Ali Saifuddien Mosque, and was situated alongside the Brunei River. The building had a flat roof and rectangular, boxy features that were typical of colonial Southeast Asian building design. Iron grilles in the Victorian style graced the doors and windows, and a little tunnel marked "H.H. Customs House" in the middle allowed cars to enter. For security reasons, the area was gated off in 1958, and the structure was enlarged to contain more administrative offices and warehouses. The structure's architecture, which combined utilitarian needs with colonial elements, emphasised its significance as Brunei's main administrative and customs facility.

== See also ==
- List of museums in Brunei
