= Pusat Bandar, Brunei =

City centre of Bandar Seri Begawan

Pusat Bandar ڤوست بندر (Jawi)
- City centre and village
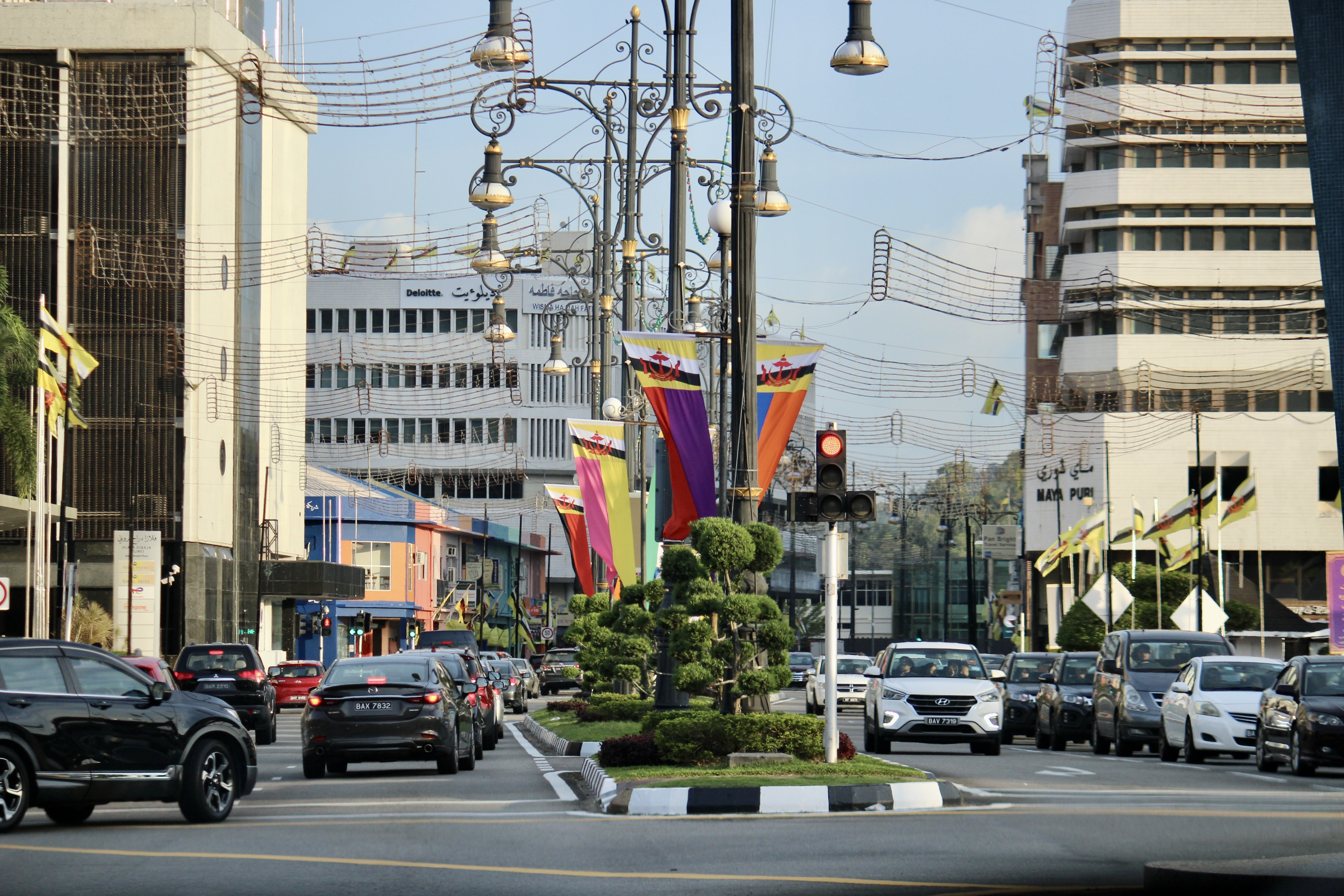
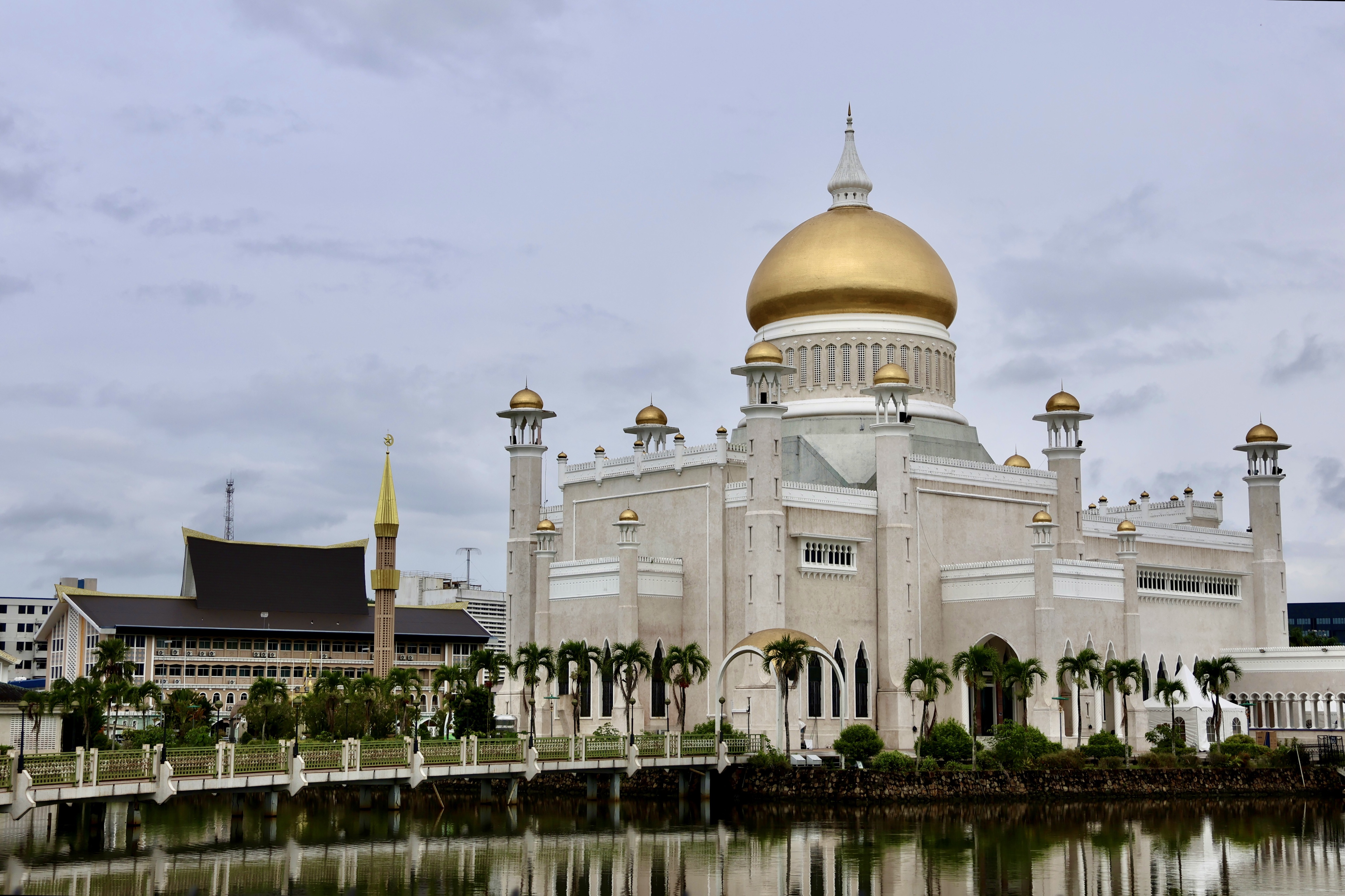
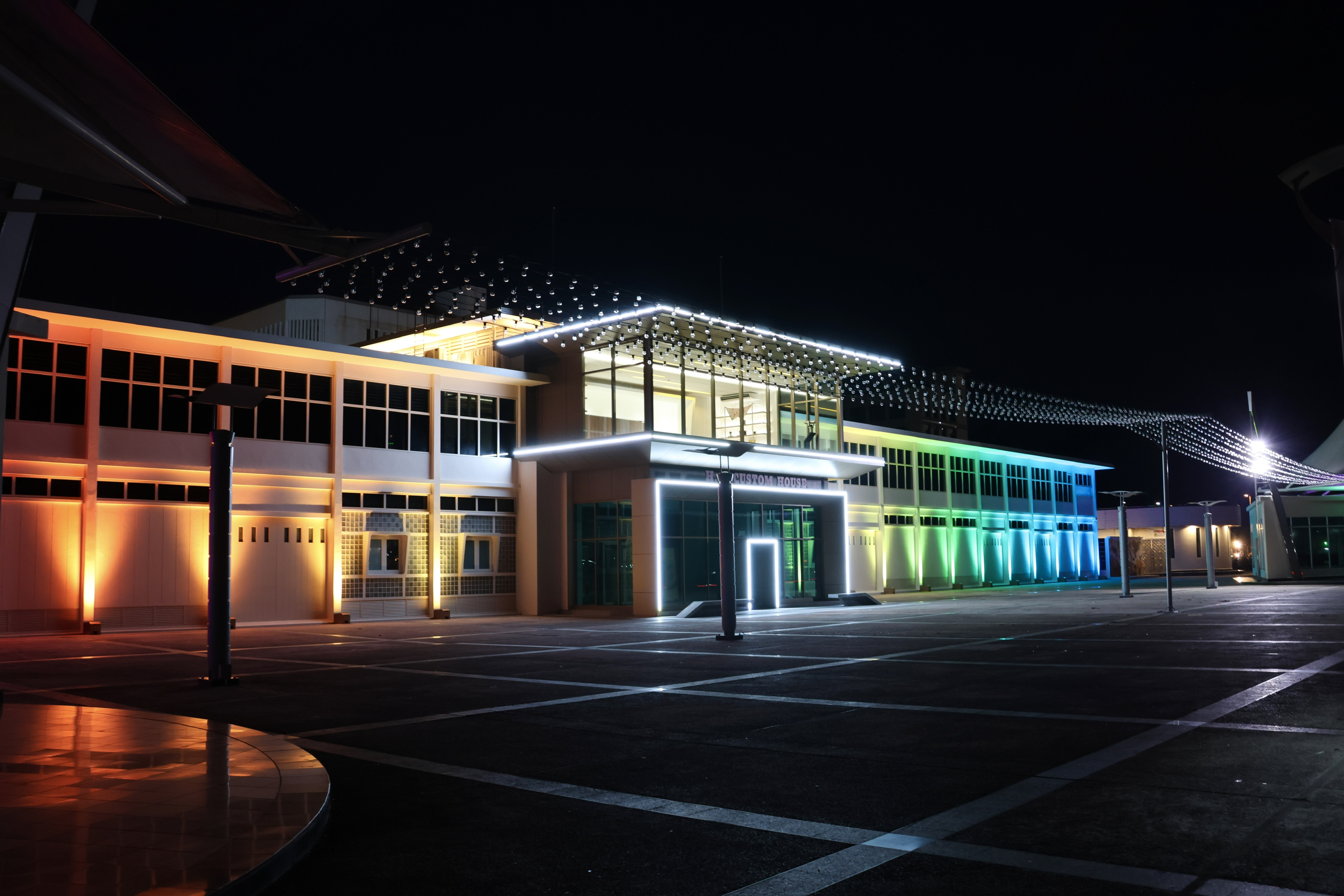
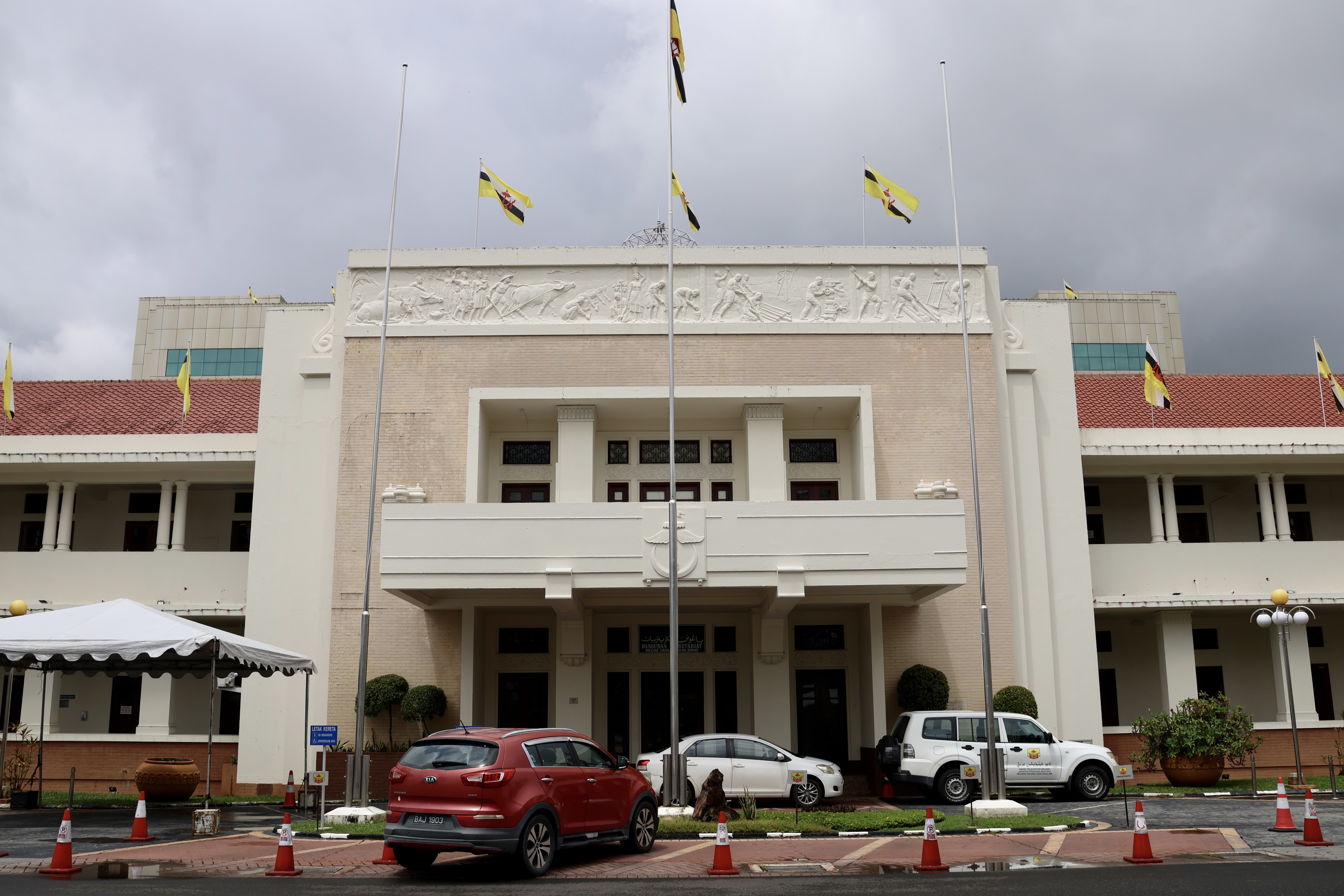
- Clockwise from top left: Jalan Sultan Omar Ali Saifuddien, Omar Ali Saifuddien Mosque, Secretariat Building, Brunei Energy Hub

- Location in Brunei
- Coordinates: 4°53′23″N 114°56′28″E
- Country: Brunei
- District: Brunei-Muara
- Mukim: Kianggeh

Population (2016)
  - Total: 204
- Time zone: UTC+8 (BNT)
- Postcode: BA8611

Pusat Bandar (English: City Centre) is the city centre of Bandar Seri Begawan, the capital of Brunei. It is home to a number of national landmarks, important government offices, and commercial and financial establishments.

== Administration ==
The city centre is part of the municipal area of the capital. It is also one of the administrative villages within Mukim Kianggeh, a mukim of Brunei-Muara District, with a population of 204 in 2016. It has the postcode BA8611.

== Infrastructure ==
=== Commerce ===
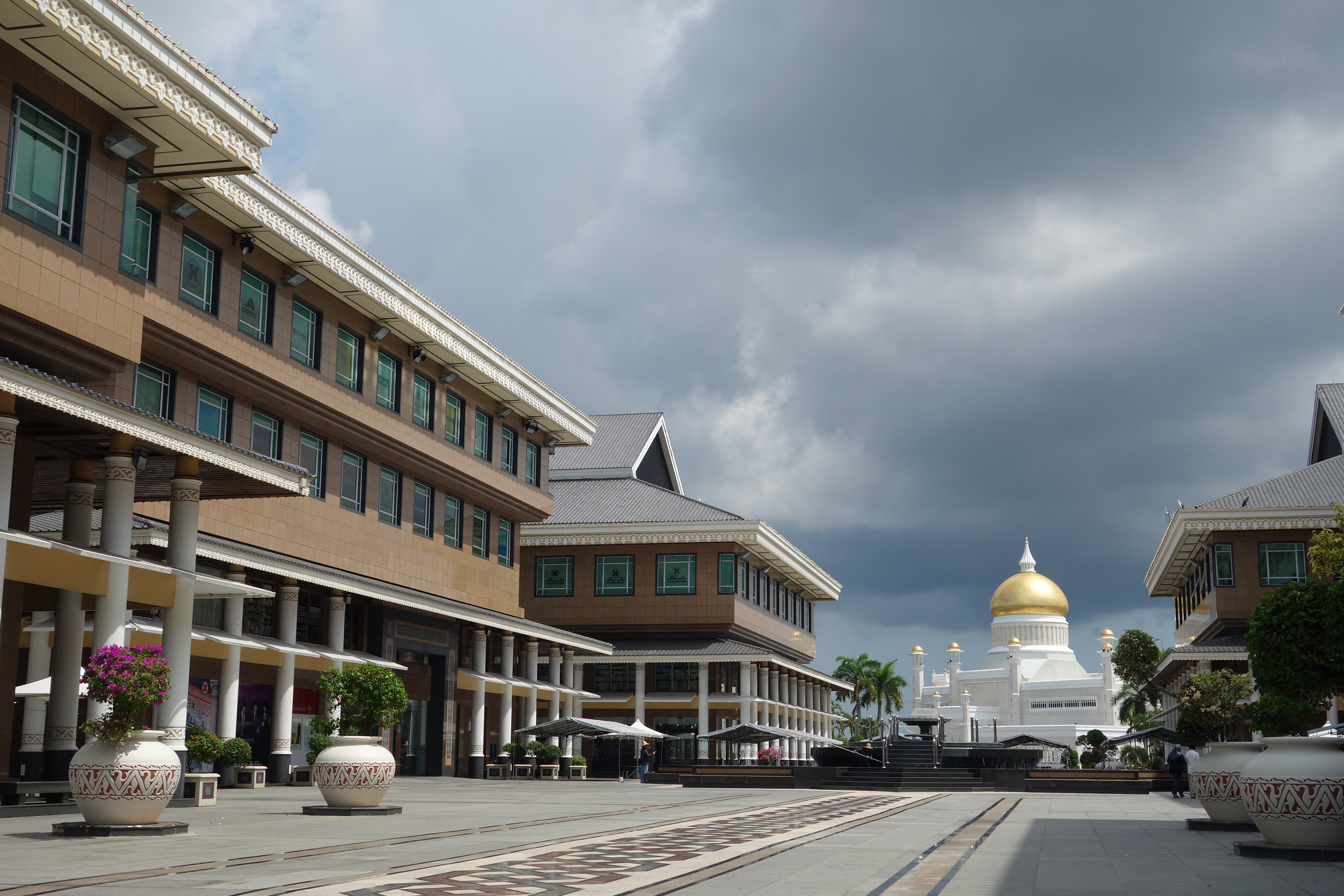
Yayasan Sultan Haji Hassanal Bolkiah Complex with Omar Ali Saifuddien Mosque in the background

- Yayasan Sultan Haji Hassanal Bolkiah Complex, a commercial centre
- Tamu Kianggeh (Kianggeh Market) offers a selection of regional produce, including edible ferns and healing plants. Also available are prepared local delicacies and the day's catch from the fisherman.

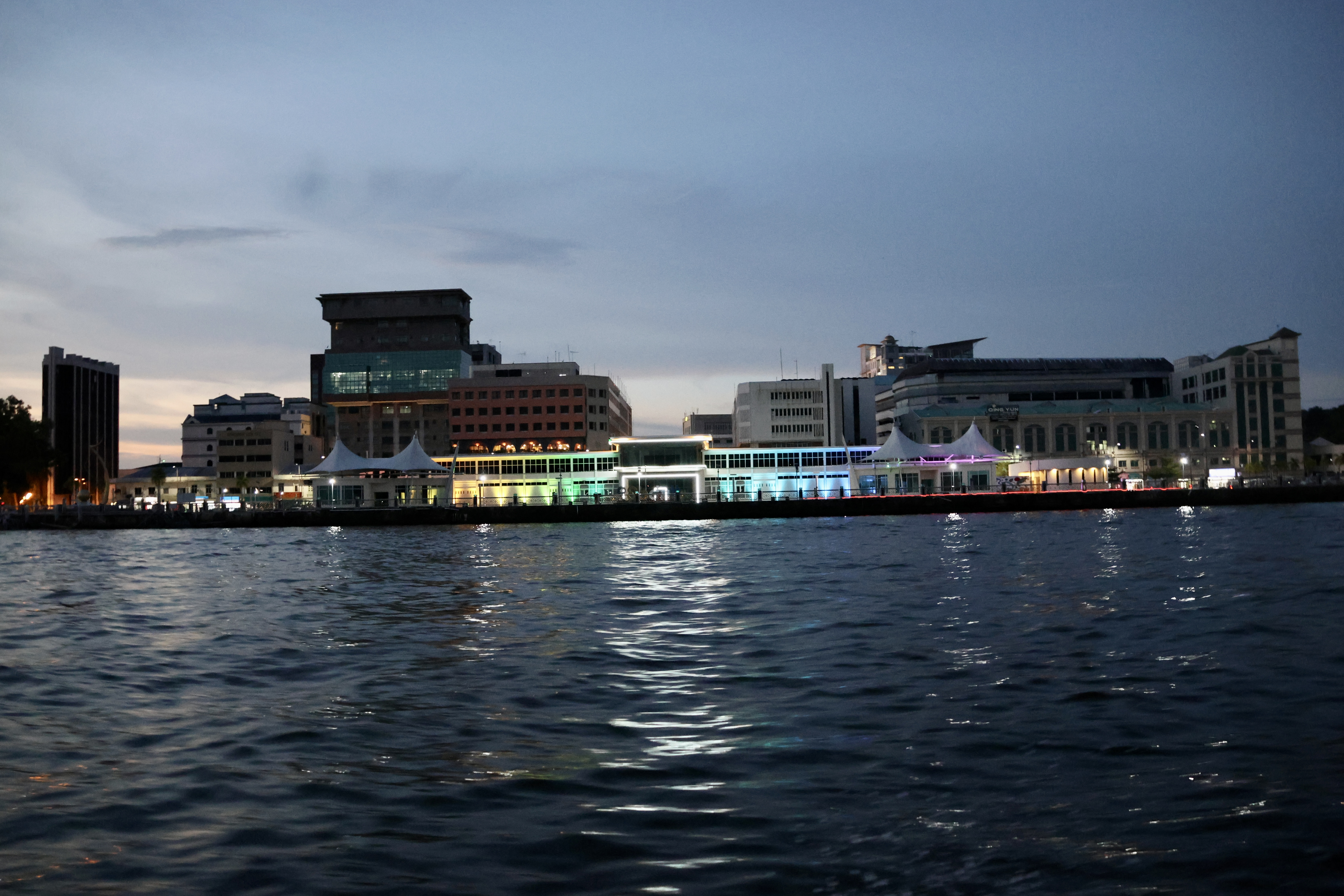
Night view of the Brunei Energy Hub and Royal Wharf from the Brunei River

=== Places of interest ===
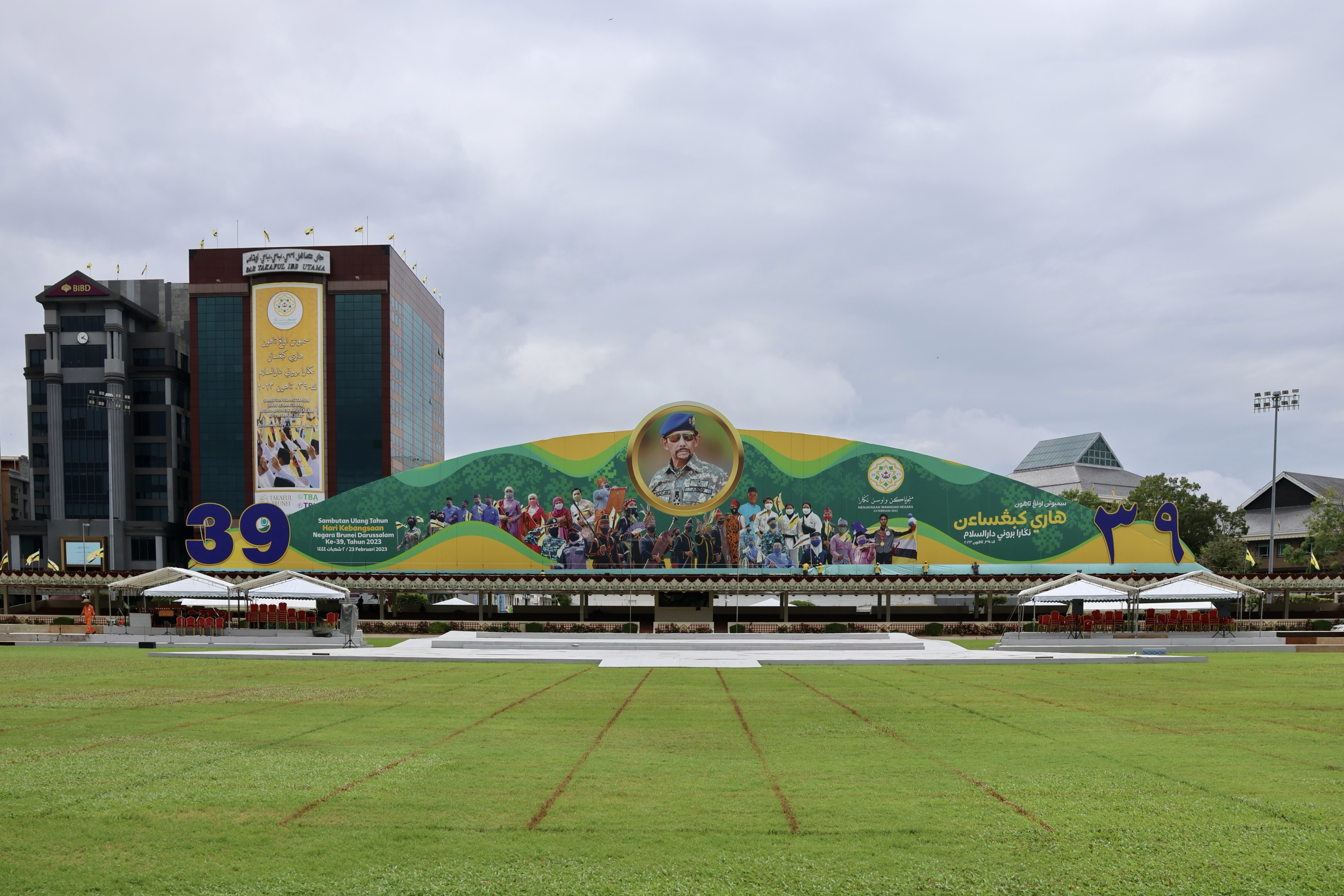
Taman Haji Sir Muda Omar Ali Saifuddien

The city centre is home to several sites with historical and cultural significance, including:

- Omar Ali Saifuddien Mosque, one of the two state mosques of Brunei. In the 1960s and early 1970s, religious activities including Holy Qur'an readings were held in the lagoon, a replica of a 16th-century mahligai or royal barge. The mosque has been hailed as Brunei's architectural triumph and has evolved into the nation's most identifiable landmark throughout time.
- 1968 Coronation Arch, to remember Sultan Hassanal Bolkiah's coronation on 1 August 1968. The gate was originally built in Kampong Sultan Lama, but in October 1993 it was moved to its current site.
- Taman Haji Sir Muda Omar 'Ali Saifuddien, where the declaration of Brunei's independence from the United Kingdom was proclaimed on 1 January 1984, and where national celebrations of Maulidur Rasu are still held.
- Cendera Lambang Kenangan is an arch that stands 10 meters tall for the silver jubilee celebration of Bandar Seri Begawan's 25-year name conversion from Bandar Brunei. The Brunei Shell Company provided the Commemorative Emblem, whose construction cost more than B$60,000.
- Brunei Energy Hub, a museum and former Royal Customs and Excise Building.
- Lapau, a royal ceremonial hall. It was where the Constitution of Brunei was promulgated in 1959, as well as Hassanal Bolkiah was crowned as the 29th and current Sultan of Brunei.
- Dewan Majlis, a former building for the Legislative Council of Brunei.
- Lapau Lama (Old Lapau), former royal ceremonial hall and now a museum within the Brunei History Centre.
- Raja Ayang Mausoleum, a mausoleum or an old Muslim cemetery near the General Post Office. It is the grave of a member of the royal family who was punished for disobeying Islamic traditions, according to elders' tales.
- Bangunan Sekretariat (Secretariat Building), which serves as the headquarters for Radio Television Brunei (RTB) and former office for the State Secretary of Brunei.
- Teng Yun Temple is the oldest still-standing Chinese temple in the country and has served as a shelter for devotees in the Chinese community ever since it was founded in the 1960s.
- Timepiece Monument, built around 1959, marks the 0-kilometre point in Brunei Darussalam, located at the intersection of Jalan Sultan in Bandar Seri Begawan. It stands near the General Post Office and the Secretariat Building. Constructed from concrete and adorned with blue Italian mosaics, the tower features four Seiko clocks at each cardinal direction. It was erected to commemorate the visit of the Yang di-Pertuan Agong to Brunei on 11 July 1959. The foundation stone was laid by Tuanku Abdul Rahman to strengthen the ties between Brunei and Malaya.
- Royal Regalia Museum (Muzium Alat Kebesaran Diraja), which houses the regalia of the Bruneian royalty.
- Istana Darussalam (Darussalam Palace), a former royal residence of Omar Ali Saifuddien III, the 28th Sultan of Brunei.
- Taman Mahkota Jubli Emas (Golden Jubilee Crown Park) is a 12-hectare riverbank park next to Kampong Ayer, and the Omar Ali Saifuddien Mosque.
- Bangunan Dewan Kemasyarakatan (Community Hall Building), which serves as the headquarters for Tabung Amanah Islam Brunei (TAIB).
- Dermaga Diraja Bandar Seri Begawan, a former wharf renovated into a promenade that now also connects to the Mahkota Jubli Emas Park.
- Mercu Dirgahayu 60 (60th Year Monument), a landmark worth B$1.5 million was sponsored and contributed by the private sector and the people and residents of the country. It symbolises the nation's devotion to the occasion, which coincides with the 60th birthday anniversary of Sultan Hassanal Bolkiah.

=== Government ===
There are several government institutions which have their headquarters in the city centre, including:

- Ministry of Home Affairs (MOHA)
- Department of Mosque Affairs
- Department of Syariah Affairs
- Syariah Court of Brunei
- Dewan Bahasa dan Pustaka Library
- Brunei History Centre, which oversees the official history of Brunei.
- Jabatan Adat Istiadat Negara (JAIN), which oversees the royal protocol of Brunei.
- Main Post Office (Pejabat Besar Pos)
- Bandar Seri Begawan Police Department
- Bandar Seri Begawan Fire Station

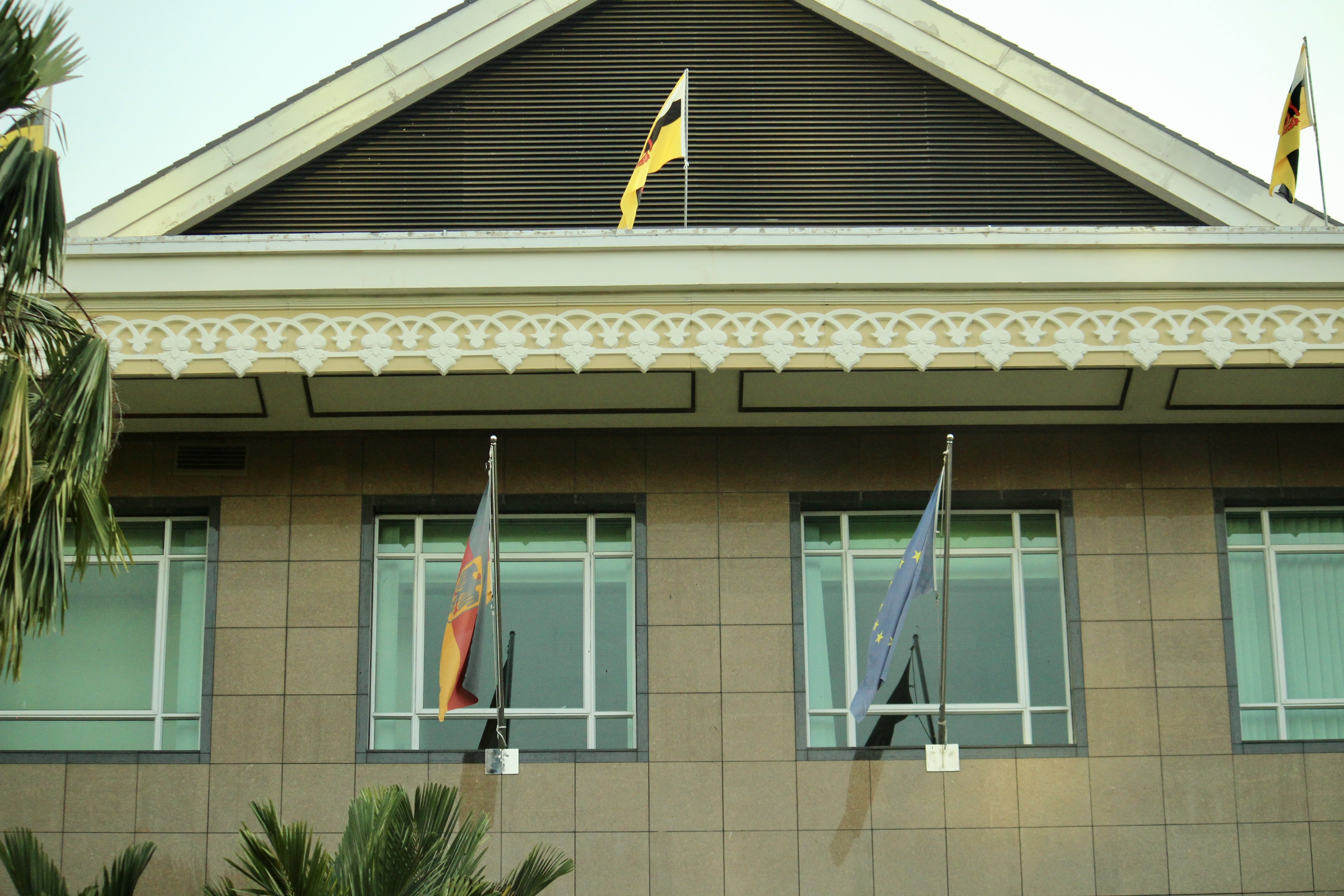
Flags of Germany and the European Union on the Yayasan Sultan Haji Hassanal Bolkiah Complex

=== Diplomacy ===
The area is also home to several embassies, high commissions and consulates.

- Embassy of Germany
- Embassy of France
- High Commission of Canada
- High Commission of the United Kingdom
- High Commission of Australia
- Consulate of Switzerland
- Consulate of Norway
- Consulate of New Zealand
