= Lapau =

Royal ceremonial hall in Brunei

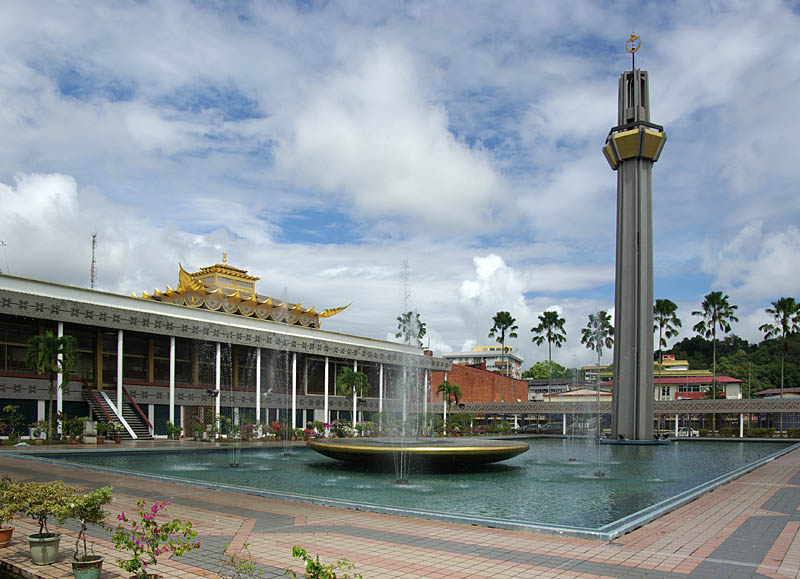
- Alternative names: Royal Ceremonial Hall

General information
- Type: Ceremonial hall
- Location: Pusat Bandar, Bandar Seri Begawan, Brunei
- Coordinates: 4°53′33″N 114°56′34″E
- Construction started: August 1965
- Completed: 1968

Design and construction
- Architect: Sultan Omar Ali Saifuddien III
- Architecture firm: Booty Edwards & Partners

The Lapau, also known as the Royal Ceremonial Hall, is a ceremonial hall in Bandar Seri Begawan, Brunei. It is where the royal ceremonies, state investiture and some state events are traditionally held. It was the place where the present Sultan of Brunei, Sultan Hassanal Bolkiah, was crowned in 1968.

== Name ==
Lapau is historically the type of a Bruneian traditional hall where royal ceremonies and audiences were held. It is believed to have existed since the first Sultan of Brunei, Sultan Muhammad Shah, and since then various lapau buildings had been built over the course of time. Lapau Kajang was the lapau which held the silver jubilee celebration of the ascension to the throne of Sultan Ahmad Tajuddin as the 28th Sultan on 22 September 1949.

== Location ==
The building is located in Pusat Bandar, the city centre of Bandar Seri Begawan. It is part of the complex which also houses the Dewan Majlis, the former building of the Legislative Council. Some notable landmarks in its vicinity include the Royal Regalia Museum, the Youth Centre and the Main Post Office (Pejabat Besar Pos) building.

== History ==
Prior to the existence of the present building, the function of lapau was housed in another building which was also known as Lapau. It was built during the reign of Sultan Omar Ali Saifuddien III and still exists today, whereby it is now commonly known as the Old Lapau (Lapau Lama) to distinguish from the current Lapau. It is now part of the Brunei History Centre building. Since 2018 it has been repurposed into a historical gallery pertaining to the Constitution of Brunei.

The plan to build a new lapau building was first proposed in 1963. The plan as well as the design of the new building was first proposed by Sultan Omar Ali Saifuddien III himself, and later refined by the commissioned architect firm Booty Edwards & Partners. It was built at a site which was then in Kampong Kianggeh. The construction began in August 1965 and completed in 1968.

The present lapau was where Sultan Hassanal Bolkiah was crowned and bestowed with the title Sultan dan Yang Di-Pertuan in a coronation ceremony known as Istiadat Berpuspa or Istiadat Perpuspaan on 1 August 1968, nearly 10 months after he was officially declared as the 29th Sultan of Brunei upon the abdication of Sultan Omar Ali Saifuddien III. It was also the place where the agreement was signed between Brunei and the Great Britain on 23 November 1971, which gave Brunei full internal independence except defence and foreign affairs.

== Ceremonies ==
The Lapau is the traditional place for the 'opening' ceremonies of the Gendang Jaga-Jaga ensemble, a Bruneian traditional act to mark the start of a royal event or festivity such as coronations, the anniversary of the ascension to the throne, birthdays, and royal weddings. The Gendang Jaga-Jaga itself is a Bruneian traditional musical ensemble which is only played every day during seasons of royal events as specified above.

The Lapau is also where the 'opening' ceremony of the Naubat is held. This is a traditional ceremony, carried out to mark the end of the mourning period upon the demise of either the Sultan, a royal family member, or a titled noble. The Naubat has the same musical instruments as the Gendang Jaga-Jaga, with the exception of the gongs (two standard and one nipple known as a canang), which are only used in the Gendang Jaga-Jaga ensemble. Today, the Naubat is performed daily throughout the life of a reigning Sultan before the dawn, sunset and evening prayers.

Royal ceremonies have been traditionally held in the Lapau. However, nowadays and due to capacity constraint they are held in Istana Nurul Iman. Only public royal ceremonies like the openings of the Naubat and the Gendang Jaga-Jaga are still held in the Lapau.
