= Pengiran Raabi'atul Adawiyyah =

Member of the Bruneian royal family (born 1992)

Raabi'atul Adawiyyah رابعة العدوية
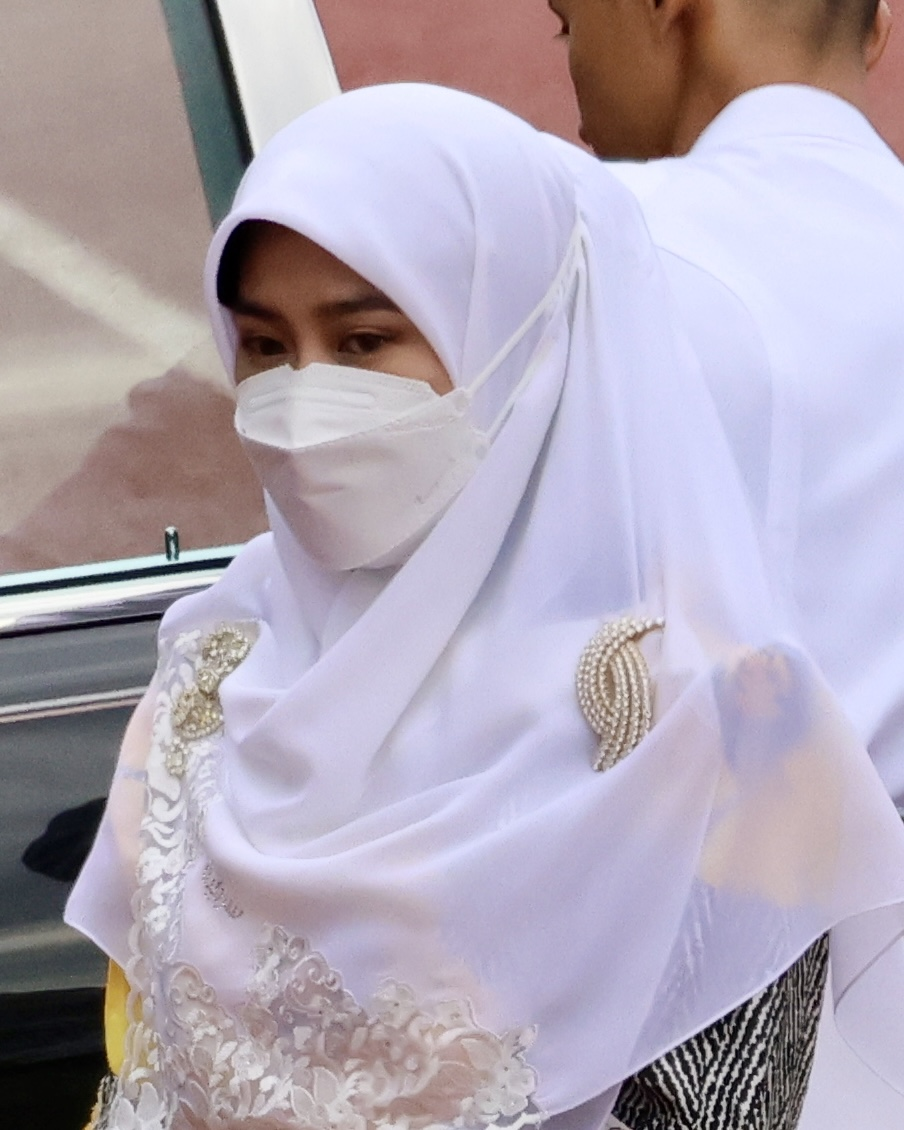
- Raabi'atul Adawiyyah in 2024
- Born: Raabi'atul Adawiyyah binti Bolkiah; 27 October 1992 (age 34)
- Spouse: Prince Abdul Malik (m. 2015)
- Issue: Muthee'ah Raayatul; Fathiyyah Rafaahul; Khaalishah Mishbaahul; Nabeelah Najmul
Names
- Yang Mulia Pengiran Raabi'atul Adawiyyah binti Pengiran Haji Bolkiah
- House: Bolkiah
- Father: Bolkiah bin Jaluddin
- Mother: Noor'aismah binti Ismail

Raabi'atul Adawiyyah binti Bolkiah (Jawi: رابعة العدوية; born 27 October 1992) is a member of the royal family of Brunei as the wife of Prince Abdul Malik, a son of Sultan Hassanal Bolkiah of Brunei.

== Early life ==
Raabi'atul `Adawiyyah was born on 27 October 1992 to Pengiran Haji Bolkiah bin Pengiran Haji Jaluddin bin Pengiran Haji Tajuddin and Pengiran Hajah Noor'aismah binti Pengiran Haji Ismail bin Pengiran Haji Tengah both of aristocratic descent. She is the second of ten siblings.

== Education and career ==
Raabi'atul attended Al-Falaah School and Rimba I Primary School for her primary education and Menglait Secondary School and Rimba Secondary School for her secondary education. In 2006, She was appointed as the head prefect while attending the Pengiran Anak Puteri Hafizah Sururul Bolkiah Religious School. She completed the Primary School Assessment in 2005, the Certificate of Primary Religious Schools in 2008, and the GCE O Level in 2010.

While in school Raabi'atul participated in several Quran recitation competitions. In 2005, she represented Pengiran Anak Puteri 'Azimah Ni'matul Bolkiah Religious School at Jame' Asr Hassanil Bolkiah Mosque and in 2008 she represented Menglait Secondary School at the ‘Dikir Dabai'ie’ national competition. In 2013, she won Best Quran Recitation at the Miss World Muslimah beauty pageant in Indonesia.

In 2012, Raabi'atul obtained several certificates of Information and communications technology skills including Internet and Computing Core Certification, Microsoft Office Specialist, and Adobe Certified Certificate. She also has attended training in the ‘ICT Youth Development Programme’ from 2012 to 2013. She worked at BAG Networks as a System Data Analyst in 2012 and at HAD Technologies as an IT instructor in 2013.

== Marriage and children ==
On 11 January 2015, the royal court announced the engagement of Raabi'atul and Prince Abdul Malik of Brunei.

In April 2015, Malik and Raabi'atul married in a ten day celebration from the 5th to the 16th. The Majlis Istiadat Berbedak Pengantin Diraja or powdering ceremony was held on the 8th at Istana Nurul Iman. Malik and Raabi'atul wore traditional red outfits and their families applied scented powder and oils to their hands to bless them. The next day was the Majlis Istiadat Akad Nikah Diraja or solemnisation ceremony at Omar Ali Saifuddien Mosque where they were officially married. The couple wore matching gold outfits for the Majlis Bersanding Pengantin Diraja on the 12th. Raabi'atul also wore diamond and emerald jewelry loaned from Queen Saleha and a pair of Swarovski crystal encrusted Christian Louboutin heels. She wore a purple dress with ruby and diamond jewelry again loaned from her mother-in-law to the Majlis Persantapan Diraja which was a large banquet at Istana Nurul Iman that evening.

Foreign dignitaries at the wedding included Sultan Ahmad Shah of Pahang, Sultan Mizan Zainal Abidin of Terengganu, Sultan Ibrahim Ismail of Johor, Tuanku Muhriz of Negeri Sembilan, Sultan Nazrin Shah of Perak, Sultan Sharafuddin Idris Shah of Selangor, Tuanku Syed Sirajuddin of Perlis, Prince Saud bin Abdul Muhsin Al Saud, and Tun Pehin Sri Abdul Taib Mahmud.

Malik and Raabi'atul reside at Istana Nurul Iman. They have four daughters all of whom have the style of Yang Amat Mulia and the title of Pengiran Anak which correspond to Her Highness and Princess respectively.

- Muthee'ah Raayatul Bolqiah (born 2 March 2016)
- Fathiyyah Rafaahul Bolqiah (born 10 March 2018)
- Khaalishah Mishbaahul Bolqiah (born 5 January 2020)
- Nabeelah Najmul Bolqiah (born 9 April 2025)

== Royal duties ==
As a member of the royal family, Raabi'atul participates in incoming state visits to Brunei, investiture ceremonies, Hari Raya Aidilfitri celebrations, and National Day events.

In August 2016, she accompanied her husband, Prince Malik, on an official visit to Singapore.

== Titles, styles, and honours ==
Styles of Raabi'atul Adawiyyah
- Reference style: Yang Mulia
- Alternative style: Yang Mulia

=== Titles and styles ===
Brunei has a complex system of titles and the royal court does not use English translations of Raabi'atul's title. After marriage, she was given the style of Yang Amat Mulia which corresponds to Her Highness and the title of Pengiran Anak Isteri Pengiran which can be translated as princess consort.

On 7 August 2026, Raabi'atul's title Yang Amat Mulia Pengiran Anak Isteri was withdrawn by the order of Sultan due to actions deemed inappropriate for a spouse of a member of the Royal Family.

- 27 October 1992 – 12 April 2015: Yang Mulia Dayangku Raabi'atul Adawiyyah binti Pengiran Haji Bolkiah
- 12 April 2015 – 7 August 2026: Yang Amat Mulia Pengiran Anak Isteri Pengiran Raabi'atul Adawiyyah binti Pengiran Haji Bolkiah
- 7 August 2026 – present: Yang Mulia Pengiran Raabi'atul Adawiyyah binti Pengiran Haji Bolkiah

=== Honours ===
- Sultan of Brunei Golden Jubilee Medal (5 October 2017)
