= SMR =

SMR may refer to:

== Organisations ==
- Seattle Mountain Rescue, American non-profit
- Solomon Mahlangu Regiment of the South African Army
- Swedish Resistance Movement, a neo-Nazi political party

== Places ==
- San Marino (by ISO 3166-1, IOC and FIFA country code)
- Rimba Secondary School (Malay: Sekolah Menengah Rimba), Brunei
- Simón Bolívar International Airport (Colombia) (by IATA code)
- Tell Kazel (Ancient Egyptian: Smr), archaeological site in Syria

== Railways ==
- Smethwick Rolfe Street railway station (station code: SMR), West Midlands, England
- Snowdon Mountain Railway, Gwynedd, Wales
- South Maitland Railway, NSW, Australia
- Stapleford Miniature Railway, Melton Mowbray, England

== Biology and medicine ==
- Sensorimotor rhythm, a brain wave rhythm
- Standardized mortality ratio, in epidemiology
- Suppressed mite reproduction, a trait in honey bees, see varroa sensitive hygiene

== Computing ==
- Shingled magnetic recording, a hard disk storage method
- State machine replication in distributed computing
- Symbolic Music Representation in MPEG-4 Part 3

== Science and technology ==
- Small modular reactor, a type of nuclear reactor
- Specialized Mobile Radio
- Square matricial representation of polynomials
- Steam methane reforming, for producing hydrogen
- Surface movement radar, used by airports
- Slope mass rating, of rock mass
- Spherically Mounted Retroreflector, a laser tracker target

== Other uses ==
- Shintō Musō-ryū, Japanese martial art
- Sites and monuments record, of archaeological sites in the UK
- Sprint medley relay, a track and field event
