= Besar Sagap =

Bruneian musician (1914–1988)

Besar Sagap SMB PKL
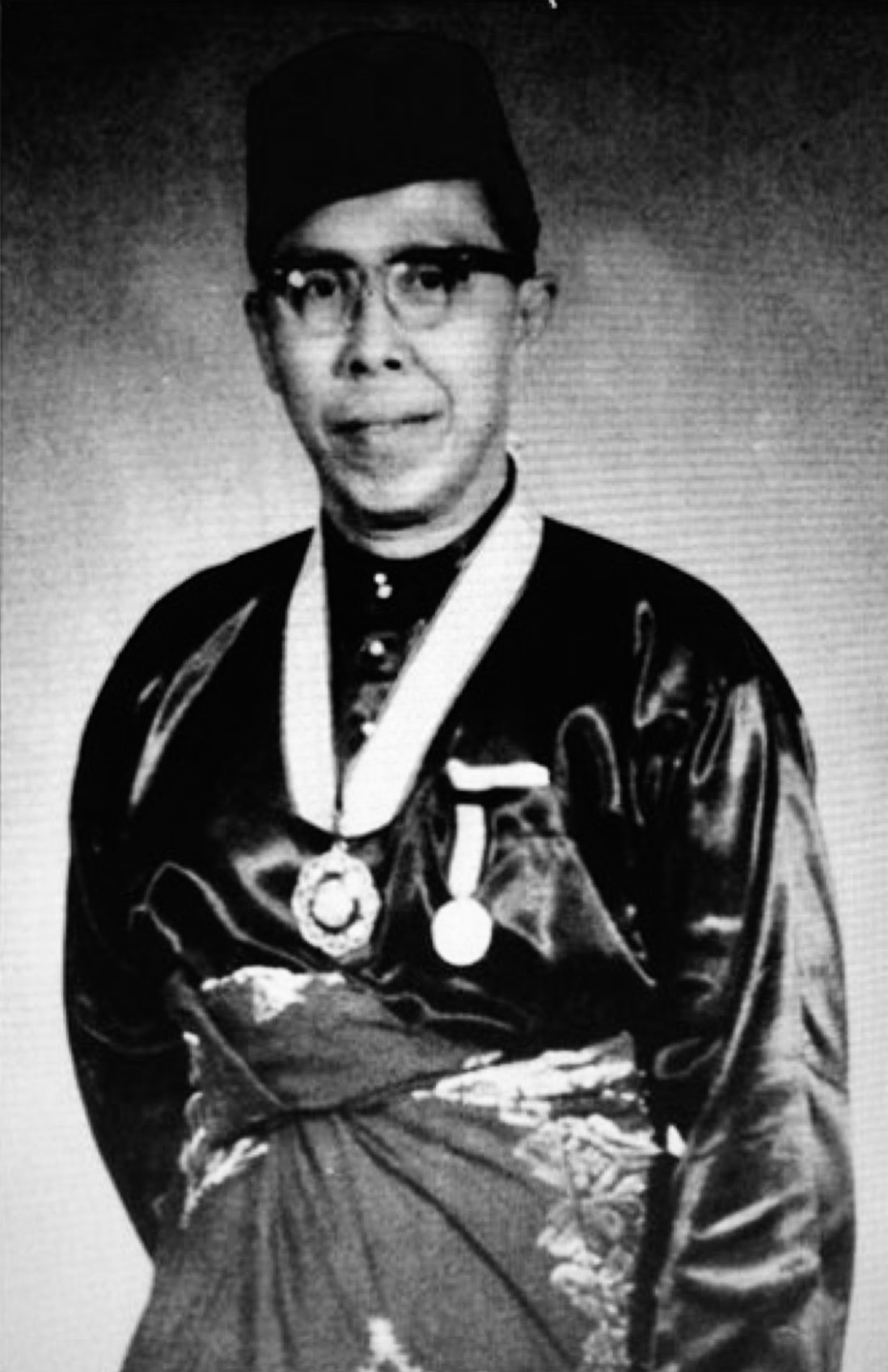
- Born: 21 September 1914; Kampong Masjid Lama, Muara, Brunei
- Died: 1988 (aged 73); Bandar Seri Begawan, Brunei
- Resting place: Royal Mausoleum, Bandar Seri Begawan, Brunei
- Occupations: Musician; composer
- Known for: Composing "Allah Peliharakan Sultan"
- Spouse: Pengiran Hajah Zahrah binti Pengiran Hashim

Besar bin Sagap (21 September 1914 – 1988) was a Bruneian musician and composer who became a notable figure who played a role in the composition of the country's national anthem, Allah Peliharakan Sultan.

== Personal life ==
Besar bin Sagap was born on 21 September 1914, in Kampong Masjid Lama, then-Muara District. As a child, he moved with his parents to the town of Sandakan, North Borneo, where he attended Sandakan Malay Primary School for his primary education and completed his secondary education at the Sandakan Roman Catholic School. His father realised at an early age that his kid had a natural musical gift while they were living there. Therefore, his father sent him to learn with a Filipino Band leader named G. A. Alberto. He learned more about the "art of music" under Alberto's tutelage, which helped him write both western and Malay songs. That allowed him to write a number of songs using the western rhythms he was familiar with at the time.

== Career ==
Besar, who at that time of composing the national anthem served in the Public Works Department during the British Military Administration. The idea that Brunei should have its own anthem, like other contemporary countries, began in 1947 among a group of young people. Besar and Pengiran Muhammad Yusuf were chosen to write the hymn; the former wrote the words, while the latter composed the music. During Barisan Pemuda's first anniversary celebration on 12 April 1947, members of the party sang patriotic songs, including "Allah Peliharakan Sultan", contributing to its eventual formal recognition. The anthem, like most songs, saw several versions before being taught to students in a Malay school in Brunei Town. Following Sultan Omar Ali Saifuddien III's coronation in 1950, Brunei's national anthem was formally acknowledged in 1951.

The early concepts for the Omar Ali Saifuddien Mosque designs originated from Sultan Omar Ali Saifuddien III himself and were drawn on paper by a draughtsman, Besar, prior to 1954.

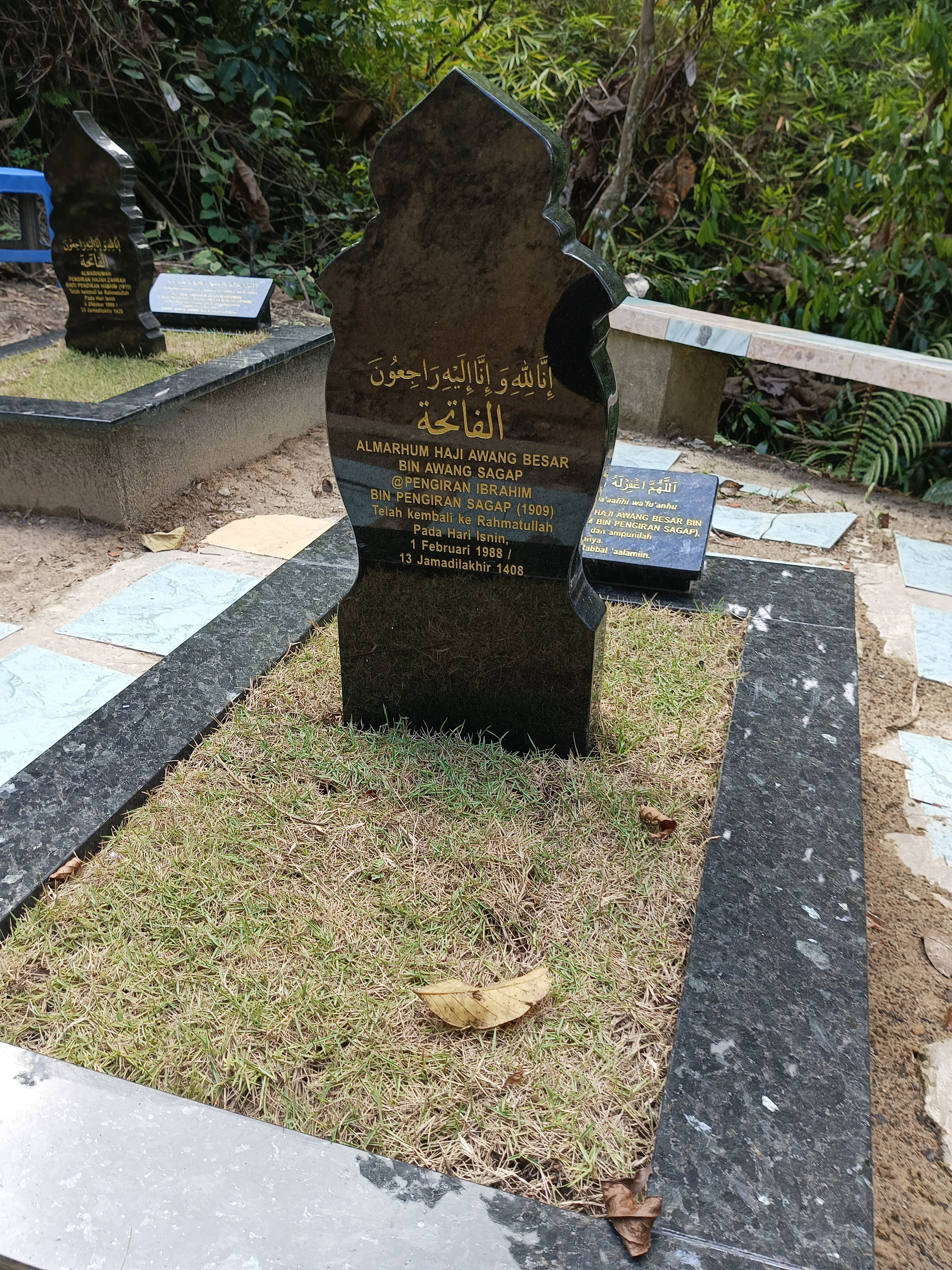
Grave of Besar Sagap at Royal Mausoleum, Bandar Seri Begawan

The songwriting team behind the national anthem would later create "Minggu Bahasa" in early 1961. On 4 October 1970, Brunei Town was formally renamed Bandar Seri Begawan at precisely 00:01. At a ceremony conducted at Padang Besar, Pengiran Muhammad Yusuf, the prime minister of Brunei, issued the declaration. Besar wrote a song called "Ibu Kota Nan Indah" with lyrics by Abdul Wahab Mohamed to celebrate the renaming of the city in honour of this milestone.

== Death ==
Besar died in 1988.

== Honours ==
Besar has received the following honours:

- Order of Seri Paduka Mahkota Brunei Third Class (SMB; 23 September 1962)
- Long Service Medal (PKL; 23 September 1956)
