= Rimba II Secondary School =

- Sekolah Menengah Rimba II
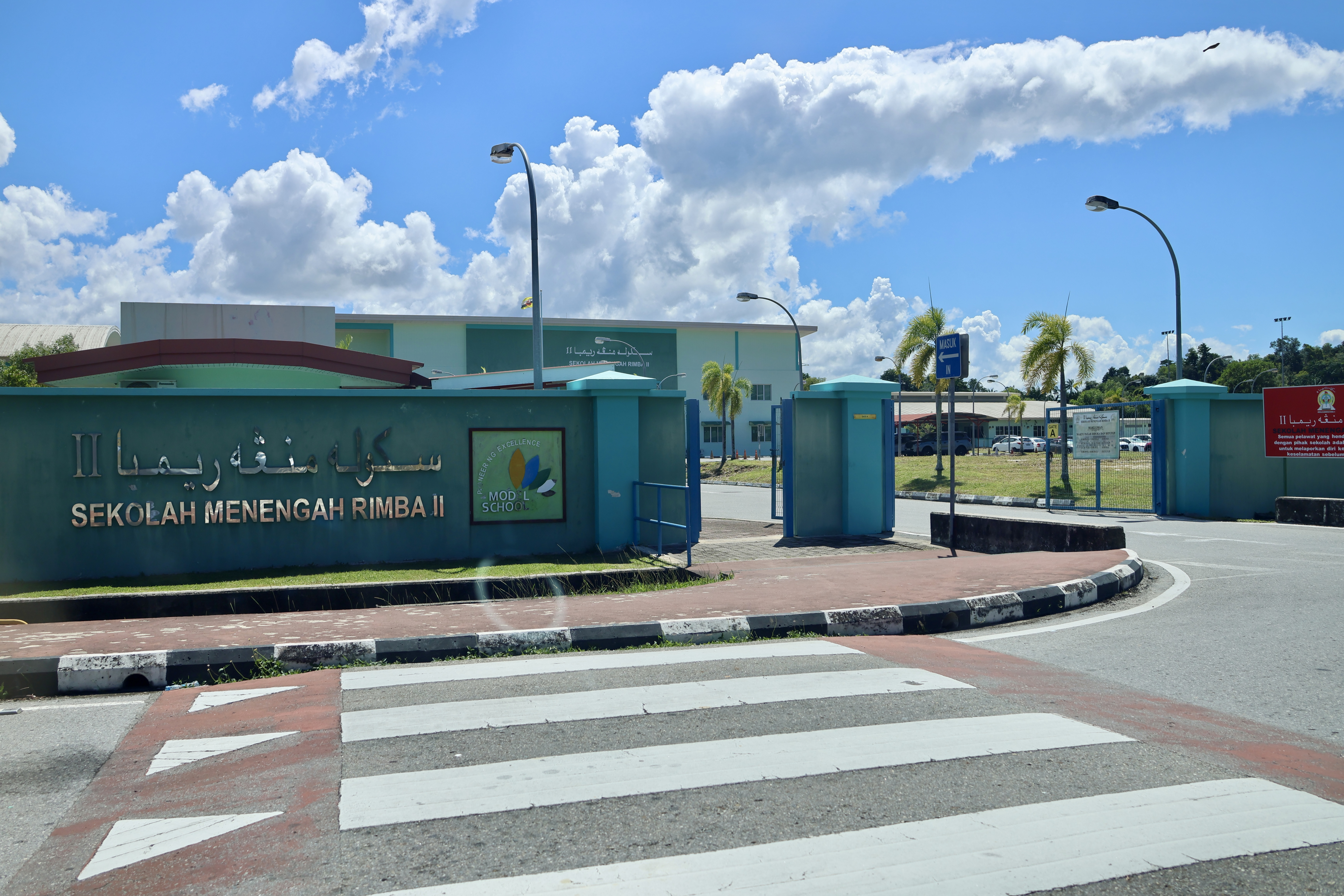
- The school in 2024

Location
- Rimba National Housing Scheme; Brunei-Muara, Gadong 'A', BE3319; Brunei
- Coordinates: 4°57′54.9″N 114°54′08.7″E

Information
- School type: Secondary School
- Principal of SMRII: Cikgu Hajah Siti Khadijah binti Haji Damit
- Gender: Mixed

Rimba II Secondary School (Malay: Sekolah Menengah Rimba II, abbreviated as SMRII) is a government secondary school in Rimba area on the outskirts of Bandar Seri Begawan, the capital of Brunei.

== Location ==
The school is technically located in Area 1 of Rimba National Housing Scheme which is a village subdivision under Gadong 'A' in Brunei-Muara District. Rimba National Housing Scheme is a public housing estate on the northern outskirts of the capital Bandar Seri Begawan.

== See also ==
- List of secondary schools in Brunei
