= RPN Kampong Rimba =

Public housing estate in Brunei

RPN Kampong Rimba Rancangan Perumahan Negara Kampung Rimba Kampong Rimba National Housing Scheme
- Public housing estate
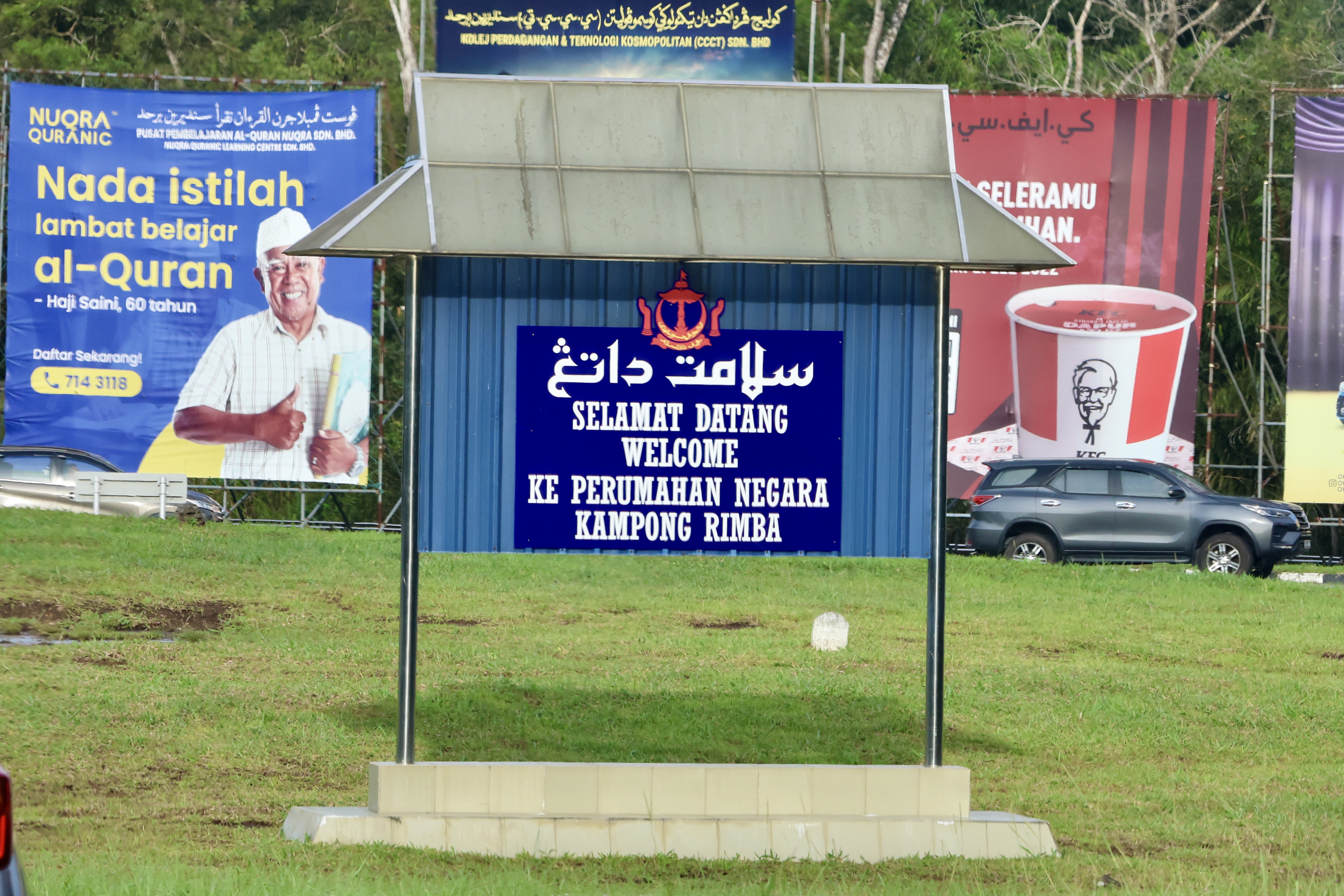
- Welcome sign

- Location in Brunei
- Coordinates: 4°57′31″N 114°54′36″E
- Country: Brunei
- District: Brunei-Muara
- Mukim: Gadong 'A'
- Sub-areas: Villages: RPN Kampong Rimba Zone 1-5

Government
  - Village head: Adanan Taha (Area 1); Mohammad Kabon (Area 2); Pengiran Hashim (Area 3); Julkepli Ibrahim (Area 4); Salleh Ahmad (Area 5)

Population (2016) (Note: see Administration section)
  - Total: 15,658
- Postcodes: BE3319, BE3419, BE3519, BE3619, BE3819

RPN Kampong Rimba or Kampong Rimba National Housing Scheme (Malay: Rancangan Perumahan Negara Kampung Rimba) is a public housing area in Brunei-Muara District, Brunei, on the northern outskirts of the capital Bandar Seri Begawan. The total population was 15,658 in 2016. It is part of Mukim Gadong 'A', a mukim in Brunei-Muara District.

== Demography ==
This housing area is for the general public, apart from the Malays, it is also inhabited by a number of Chinese people. A total of 251 houses are found in this area of which 45 houses are inhabited by the Chinese community while the rest are Malays. In total, this area is inhabited by 2,600 residents who mostly work with the government, in addition to the private sector. In this village, a total of 190 old age pension recipients, 98 people receiving welfare assistance, six poor people, 34 orphans and six converts.

== Administration ==
For administrative purposes the area has since been divided into, and established as, five village subdivisions:

Village	Population (2016)	Postcode
RPN Kampong Rimba Zone 1	1,736	BE3319
RPN Kampong Rimba Zone 2	4,025	BE3419
RPN Kampong Rimba Zone 3	2,963	BE3519
RPN Kampong Rimba Zone 4	2,301	BE3619
RPN Kampong Rimba Zone 5	4,633	BE3819
Total	15,658	

All of them are villages under Mukim Gadong 'A'.

== Education ==
There are two primary and two secondary schools in the public housing area and they are all government schools. The schools include:

- Secondary: Rimba Secondary School and Rimba II Secondary School
- Primary: Rimba I Primary School and Rimba II Primary School

The schools provide the public education for the pupils and students residing in the public housing area as well as the neighbouring Rimba settlement.

A new secondary school is also currently built in the area which will cater for the Islamic religious education of the Arabic stream.

== See also ==
- STKRJ Kampong Rimba
- Lambak Kanan
