= Prince Abdul Malik of Brunei =

Bruneian prince (born 1983)

Abdul Malik
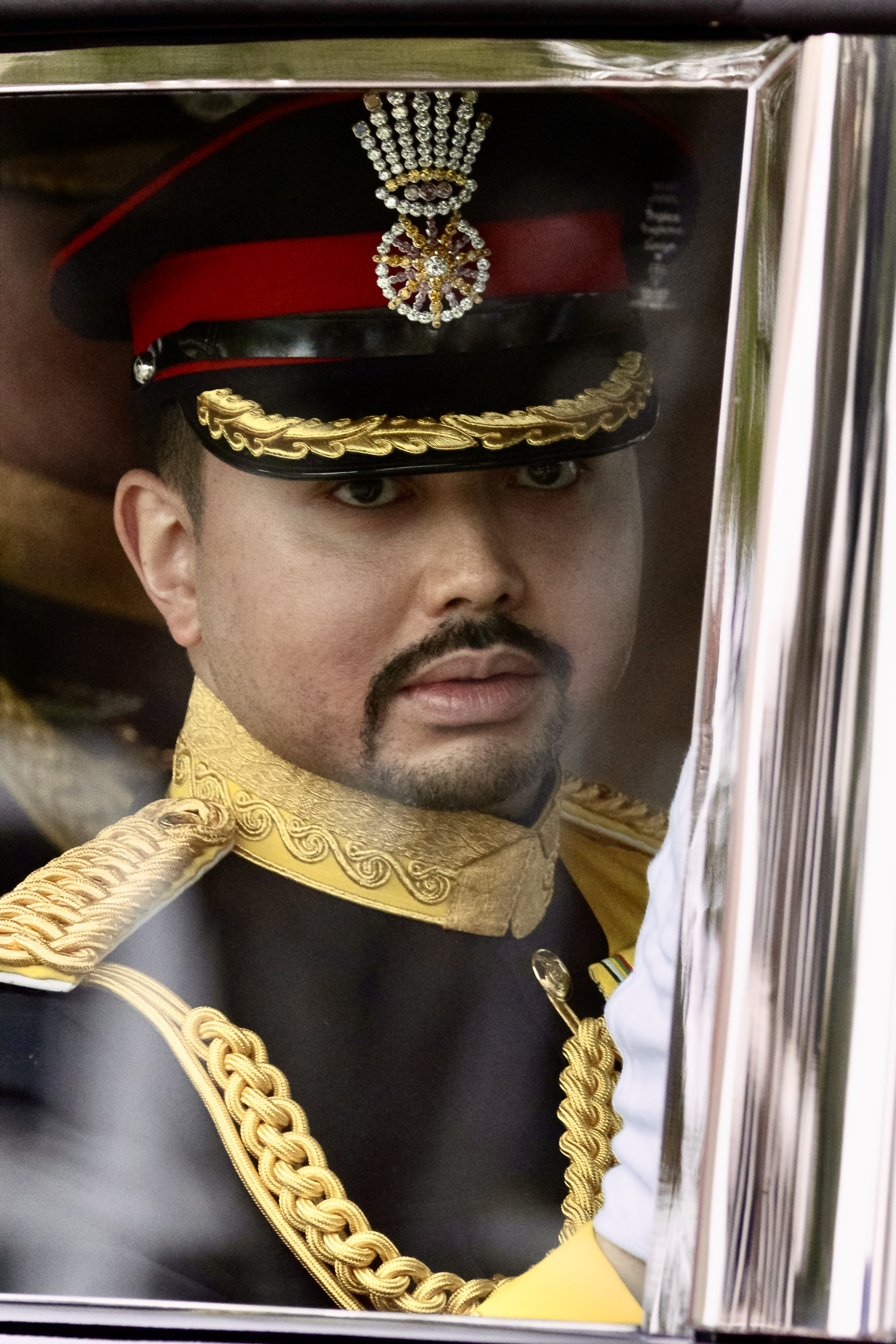
- Malik in 2024
- Born: Abdul Malik ibni Hassanal Bolkiah Mu'izzaddin Waddaulah; 30 June 1983 (age 43); Istana Nurul Iman, Bandar Seri Begawan, Brunei
- Spouse: Raabi'atul Adawiyyah (m. 2015)
- Issue: Muthee'ah Raayatul; Fathiyyah Rafaahul; Khaalishah Mishbaahul; Nabeelah Najmul
- House: Bolkiah
- Father: Hassanal Bolkiah
- Mother: Saleha binti Mohamed Alam
- Religion: Sunni Islam
- Education: Universiti Brunei Darussalam

Abdul Malik ibni Hassanal Bolkiah (Jawi: عبد الملك; born 30 June 1983) is a member of the royal family of Brunei. He is the son of Sultan Hassanal Bolkiah and Queen Saleha. He is fourth in the line of succession to the Bruneian throne.

== Early life ==
Prince Malik was born on 30 June 1983 at Istana Nurul Iman to Sultan Hassanal Bolkiah of Brunei and his first wife, Queen Saleha of Brunei. He has five full siblings and six half-siblings from his father's other marriages.

== Education ==
Prince Malik was educated privately at Istana Nurul Iman and the Brunei Malay Teachers Association School.

On 30 October 2008, he graduated from Universiti Brunei Darussalam with Bachelor of Arts degree in Educational Studies with second upper class honours.

== Marriage and issue ==
On 11 January 2015, the royal court announced the engagement of Prince Malik to Raabi'atul Adawiyyah binti Haji Bolkiah.

In April 2015, Malik and Raabi'atul married in a ten day celebration from the 5th to the 16th. The Majlis Istiadat Berbedak Pengantin Diraja or powdering ceremony was held on the 8th at Istana Nurul Iman. Malik and Raabi'atul wore traditional red outfits and their families applied scented powder and oils to their hands to bless them. The next day was the Majlis Istiadat Akad Nikah Diraja or solemnisation ceremony at Omar Ali Saifuddien Mosque where they were officially married. The couple wore matching gold outfits for the Majlis Bersanding Pengantin Diraja on the 12th. The last big event was the Majlis Persantapan Diraja which was a large banquet at Istana Nurul Iman that evening.

Foreign dignitaries at the wedding included Sultan Ahmad Shah of Pahang, Sultan Mizan Zainal Abidin of Terengganu, Sultan Ibrahim Ismail of Johor, Tuanku Muhriz of Negeri Sembilan, Sultan Nazrin Shah of Perak, Sultan Sharafuddin Idris Shah of Selangor, Tuanku Syed Sirajuddin of Perlis, Prince Saud bin Abdul Muhsin Al Saud, and Tun Pehin Sri Abdul Taib Mahmud.

Malik and Raabi'atul reside at Istana Nurul Iman. They have four daughters all of whom have the style of Yang Amat Mulia and the title of Pengiran Anak which correspond to Her Highness and Princess respectively.

- Muthee'ah Raayatul Bolqiah (born 2 March 2016)
- Fathiyyah Rafaahul Bolqiah (born 10 March 2018)
- Khaalishah Mishbaahul Bolqiah (born 5 January 2020)
- Nabeelah Najmul Bolqiah (born 9 April 2025)

On 7 August 2026, Raabi'atul's title Yang Amat Mulia Pengiran Anak Isteri was withdrawn by the order of Sultan due to actions deemed inappropriate for a spouse of a member of the Royal Family. However, they are still legally married.

== Royal duties ==
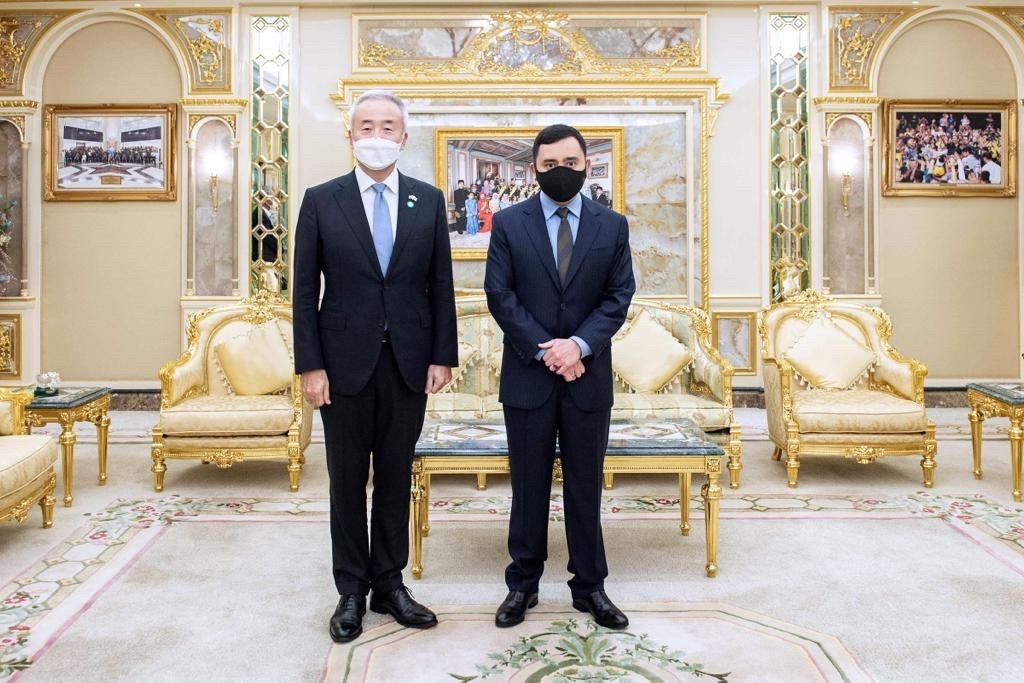
Ambassador Maeda and Malik in 2022

In April 2011, the Sultan appointed Prince Malik as a member of the Privy Council and he is also the Deputy Chairman 1 of the Jabatan Adat Istiadat Negara, or the Department of State Customs. On 1 March 2013, Malik was appointed the Chairman of the Committee of Governors of Sultan Haji Hassanal Bolkiah Foundation.

Along with his wife, Raabi'atul Adawiyyah, Malik frequently attends royal gatherings and ceremonies. Furthermore, he often attends diplomatic gatherings and trips, including discussions with foreign ambassadors.

In June 2026, the Sultan appointed Malik to his cabinet as Minister in the Prime Minister’s Office.

== Titles, styles, and honours ==
Styles of Prince Abdul Malik
- Reference style: Yang Teramat Mulia
- Alternative style: His Royal Highness

His full title and style is Duli Yang Teramat Mulia Paduka Seri Pengiran Muda 'Abdul Malik ibni Kebawah Duli Yang Maha Mulia Paduka Seri Baginda Sultan Haji Hassanal Bolkiah Mu'izzaddin Waddaulah It is usually translated in English as His Royal Highness Prince Malik of Brunei.

=== Honours ===
==== National ====
- Order of the Crown of Brunei (DKMB)
- Sultan Hassanal Bolkiah Medal (PHBS)
- Sultan of Brunei Silver Jubilee Medal (5 October 1992)
- Sultan of Brunei Golden Jubilee Medal (5 October 2017)
- National Day Silver Jubilee Medal (23 February 2009)
- Proclamation of Independence Medal (1 January 1984)

==== Foreign ====
- Malaysia:
  - Recipient of the 14th Yang di-Pertuan Agong Installation Medal (11 April 2012)

=== Namesakes ===
- Pengiran Muda Abdul Malik Religious School, a religious school in Kampong Bengkurong
- Pengiran Muda Abdul Malik Mosque, a mosque in Kampong Tungku completed on 9 July 2012

Prince Abdul Malik of Brunei House of Bolkiah Born: 30 June 1983
Preceded by Muhammad Aiman	Succession to the Bruneian throne 4th position	Succeeded by Abdul Mateen
