= Public holidays in Brunei =

This is a list of holidays in Brunei.

== Public holidays ==
Date	English name	Local name	Remarks
1 January	New Year's Day	Awal Tahun Masihi	Double holiday celebrating both the opening of the Gregorian New Year and the 1984 Proclamation of Independence.
23 February	National Day	Hari Kebangsaan Negara Brunei Darussalam	Independence from the United Kingdom in 1984.
31 May	Royal Brunei Armed Forces Day	Hari Angkatan Bersenjata Diraja Brunei	The Royal Brunei Armed Forces was founded on that day in 1961.
15 July	His Majesty the Sultan's Birthday	Hari Keputeraan KDYMM Sultan Brunei	Commemorates the birthday of Sultan Hassanal Bolkiah in 1946.
25 December	Christmas Day	Hari Natal	This Christian holiday celebrates of after the birth of Jesus Christ.
1 Ramadan	Start of Ramadan (Cuti Awal Puasa Islam)	Hari Pertama Berpuasa	This Islamic calendar celebrates the open of the fasting month of Ramadan.
17 Ramadhan	Nuzul Al-Quran	Hari Nuzul Al-Quran	This Islamic calendar celebrates the revelation of the 1st verses of the Qur'an.
1-3 Syawal	Hari Raya Aidil Fitri	Hari Raya Aidil Fitri (3-hari)	This Islamic calendar celebrates the close of the fasting month of Ramadhan.
10 Dzulhijjah	Hari Raya Aidil Adha	Hari Raya Aidil Adha	This Islamic calendar celebrates the willingness of Ibrahim to sacrifice his son Ismael as an act of obedience to Allah.
1 Muharram	Islamic New Year	Awal Tahun Hijrah	Celebrates the opening of the Islamic calendar.
12 Rabiul Awal	Birth of the Prophet	Maulidur Rasul	This Islamic calendar celebrates the birthday of the Islamic Prophet Muhammad.
27 Rejab	Isra Mi'raj	Israk dan Mikraj	This Islamic calendar celebrates the journey that Islamic prophet Muhammad took during a single night around the year 621.
1st day of 1st lunar month	Chinese New Year	Tahun Baru Cina	Celebrates the opening of the Chinese calendar.
