= National Day (Brunei) =

National holiday in Brunei, observed annually on 23 February

Hari Kebangsaan Negara Brunei Darussalam (National Day)
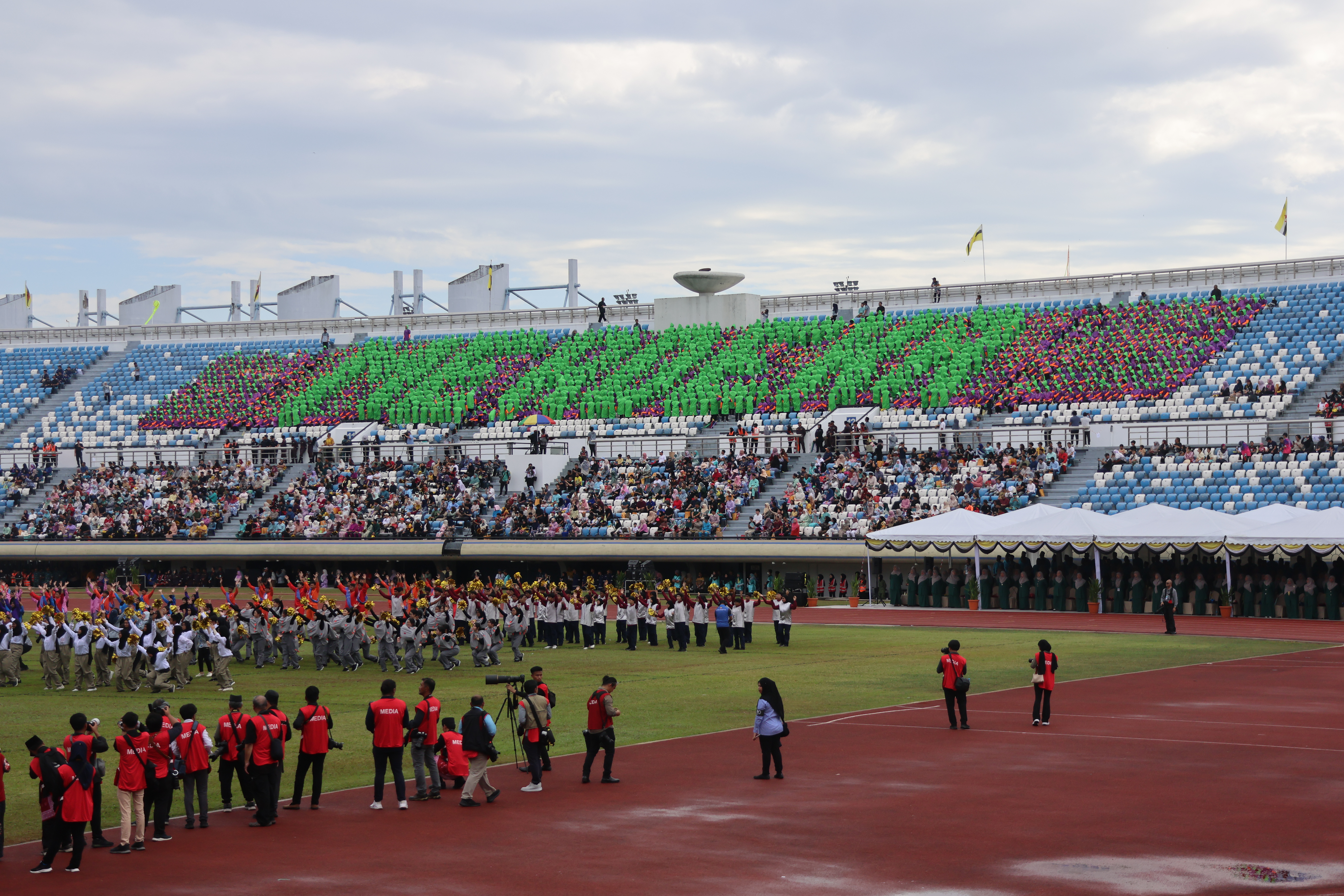
- National Day 2024
- Official name: Hari Kebangsaan
- Also called: Hari Kemerdekaan Negara Brunei Darussalam
- Observed by: Bruneians
- Type: National
- Significance: Marks the independence of Brunei
- Date: 23 February
- Next time: 23 February 2027
- Duration: A day
- Frequency: Annual
- First time: 1985; 41 years ago

National Day (Malay: Hari Kebangsaan; Jawi: کبڠساءن هاري) or Independence Day (Hari Kemerdekaan) is the national day of Brunei, commemorating the anniversary of Brunei's proclamation of independence. It was made a national holiday by government decree in 1985. Although Brunei formally proclaimed independence from the United Kingdom on 1 January 1984, it did not celebrate its national day until 23 February.

== History ==
=== Background ===
In 1888, Brunei signed a deal with the British to come under their protection in order to ensure its own political survival. As piracy and rebellion threatened the internal order of the kingdom and Sarawak's White Rajahs encroached on the borders, Sultan Hashim Jalilul Alam Aqamaddin petitioned the British government for help to slow the rapid collapse of Brunei's land. The British residency was established in 1906, and Brunei remained under their rule for an additional 53 years. The Constitution Agreement, which abolished the residence requirement and established internal self-government while leaving Britain in charge of defense and foreign policy, was signed with the United Kingdom in 1959, marking the beginning of the country's journey toward independence. The timeframe for independence was established by subsequent treaties with the United Kingdom in 1971 and 1979.

=== 1 January 1984 ===
Before midnight fell on 1 January 1984, Sultan Hassanal Bolkiah read the Declaration of Independence:

Whereas, the time has now arrived when Brunei Darussalam will resume full international responsibility as a sovereign and independent nation in the community of nations.
And whereas, via the Treaty of Friendship and Cooperation with the United Kingdom..... Brunei Darussalam's restoration of full independence and the return of full responsibility for defense and foreign affairs to the person of the Sultan and Yang di-Pertuan of Brunei from HM the Queen has been set to happen on the first day of January of 1984, as agreed upon and under the provisions of said Treaty.

— Sultan Hassanal Bolkiah, 1 January 1984

Upon the reading of the proclamation, as midnight fell, Omar Ali Saifuddien III, the father of His Majesty, led three cries of "Allahu Akbar" among the 30,000 people gathered at the Padang Besar (present day Taman Haji Sir Muda Omar 'Ali Saifuddien). After the national anthem Allah Peliharakan Sultan was played, a 21-gun salute was fired to celebrate the event, and the sounds of the hadrah resounded around the field. That evening, the capital Bandar Seri Begawan was packed to the gills with people from all over the country praying for a smooth handover outside the Sultan Omar Ali Saifuddin Mosque and the field despite the heavy rainfall.

=== 23 February 1984 ===
Notwithstanding the fact that Brunei proclaimed its independence on 1 January, the date for National Day was chosen as 23 February. Hassanal Bolkiah National Stadium was chosen as the location for the celebrations. The Acting Chief Minister (Menteri Besar), Abdul Aziz, presided over the preparations.

==== Attendance ====
Several key figures of the Commonwealth and countries' representatives attended the celebration, such as:

- Charles, Prince of Wales
- Tāufaʻāhau Tupou IV, King of Tonga
- Malietoa Tanumafili II, O le Ao o le Malo of Samoa
- Suharto, President of Indonesia
- Ferdinand Marcos, President of the Philippines
- Zia-ul-Haq, President of Pakistan

== Themes ==
There have been multiple themes used for the celebration of national day such as;

Year(s)	Theme	Translation
1985	Bersatu Padu Menghayati Konsep Negara Melayu Islam Beraja	United to Appreciate the Concept of Malay Islamic State
1986	Membangun Negara Tanggungjawab Bersama	Building a Country of Mutual Responsibility
1987	Bersatu Ke arah Keamaan dan Kemajuan	United Towards Prosperity and Progress
1988	Berdisiplin Cergas Berbudaya Negara Bahagia	Disciplined, Healthy Culture, Happy Country
1989	Berdikari Meningkatkan Kemakmuran Negara	Self-reliance Increases National Prosperity
1990	Perhubungan Berkesan Mengeratkan Perpaduan	Relationships Effectively Strengthen Unity
1991	Bersatu Padu Mengekalkan Ketahanan Nasional	United in Keeping the National Resilience
1992	Menanai Kedaulatan Tanahairku	Surviving the Sovereignty of My Homeland
1993	Meneguhkan Kesejahteraan Tanahairku	Strengthening the Well-being of My Homeland
1994	Bangsa Cemerlang Tanahair Gemilang	Outstanding Nation, Glorious Fatherland
1995	Brunei Darussalam Tanahairku	Brunei Darussalam, My Homeland
1996	Pembangunan Masyarakat Matlamat Negara	Community Development, the National Goals
1997	Kemajuan Ekonomi Teras Kesejahteraan	Core Economic Progress of Wellbeing
1998	Membina Insan Yang Sempurna Dengan Pendidikan Bersepadu	Building the Perfect Human With Integrated Education
1999	Siap Siaga Ke Alaf Baru	Ready For The New Millennium
2000	Mengukuhkan Jati Diri Bangsa Di Alaf Baru	Strengthening the Nation's Self-Reliance In The New Millennium
2001	Maju Bangsaku Sejahtera Negaraku	Forward My Nation, Prosperous is My Country
2002	Memperkasa Keupayaan Bangsa	Empowering the Nation's Capabilities
2003	Bangsa Berilmu Negara Maju	Knowledgeable Nation, Developed Country
2004	Patriotisme Teras Keteguhan Negara	Patriotism at the Core of National Strength
2005	Bersepadu Memperkasa Mandiri Bangsa	Integrated Empowering the Nation
2006	Mempertingkatkan Daya Saing Bangsa	Enhancing the Competitiveness of the Nation
2007	Iltizam Memperkasa Keupayaan Bangsa	Commitment to Empowering the Nation's Capabilities
2008	Tunas Bangsa	Budding Nation
2009	Kedewasaan Bernegara	Adulthood of the Nation
2010–2013	Negaraku Brunei Darussalam	My Country Brunei Darussalam
2014–2016	Generasi Berwawasan	Visionary Generation
2017–2023	Menjayakan Wawasan Negara	Successing The National Vision
2024–2026	Bersatu Mencapai Cita Negara	United to Achieve the National Aspiration
