= Rimba Secondary School =

- Sekolah Menengah Rimba

Location
- Rimba National Housing Scheme; Gadong 'A', Brunei-Muara, BE3519; Brunei; 4°57′22″N 114°55′08″E

Information
- Established: 2005
- Authority: Ministry of Education
- Years offered: 7-11
- Gender: Mixed

Rimba Secondary School (Malay: Sekolah Menengah Rimba, abbreviated as SMR) is a government secondary school located in Rimba area on the outskirts of Bandar Seri Begawan, the capital of Brunei.

== Location ==
The school is technically located in Area 3 of Rimba National Housing Scheme which is a village subdivision under Gadong 'A' in Brunei-Muara District. Rimba National Housing Scheme is a public housing estate near Rimba on the northern outskirts of the capital Bandar Seri Begawan.

== History ==
Rimba Secondary School was established in 2005. It was officially opened by Sheikh Adanan bin Sheikh Mohamad, the then a Permanent Secretary in the Ministry of Education, on 9 May 2005. Previously, the school ground was home to Paduka Seri Begawan Sultan Science College until its first campus at Jalan Muara was refurbished. The principal was Haji Malai Shah bin Hj Yusof. In 2009, Rimba Secondary School had over 2,000 students and is one of the largest secondary schools in Brunei.

== Athletics ==
The soccer team won the Bruneian School Soccer Championship in 2007. Baseball and rugby were introduced in 2008. The school won the Zone 2 Inter-school table tennis championship in March 2008.

== Notable alumni ==
- Raabi'atul Adawiyyah (born 1992), wife to Prince Abdul Malik

== See also ==
- List of secondary schools in Brunei
