= Rodolfo Nolli =

Italian artist

Cavaliere Rodolfo Nolli
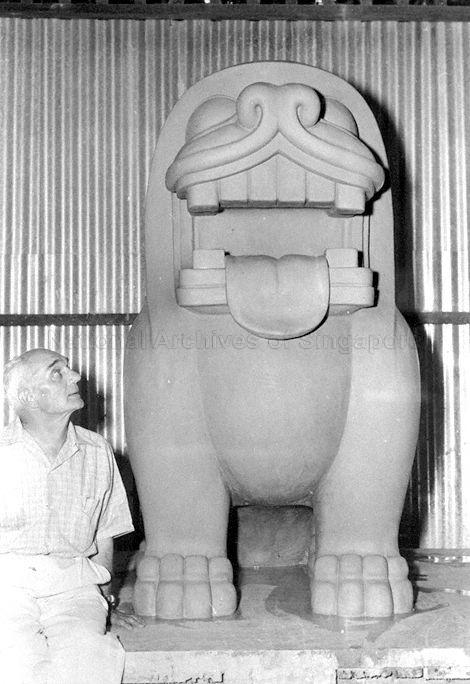
- Nolli in 1954 with one of his stone lion sculptures
- Born: 1888; Lombardy, Italy
- Died: 1963 (aged 74–75); Italy
- Known for: sculpture, architecture
- Notable work: marble decorations at Old Supreme Court Building, The Fullerton Hotel Singapore, Omar Ali Saifuddien Mosque
- Awards: Cavaliere

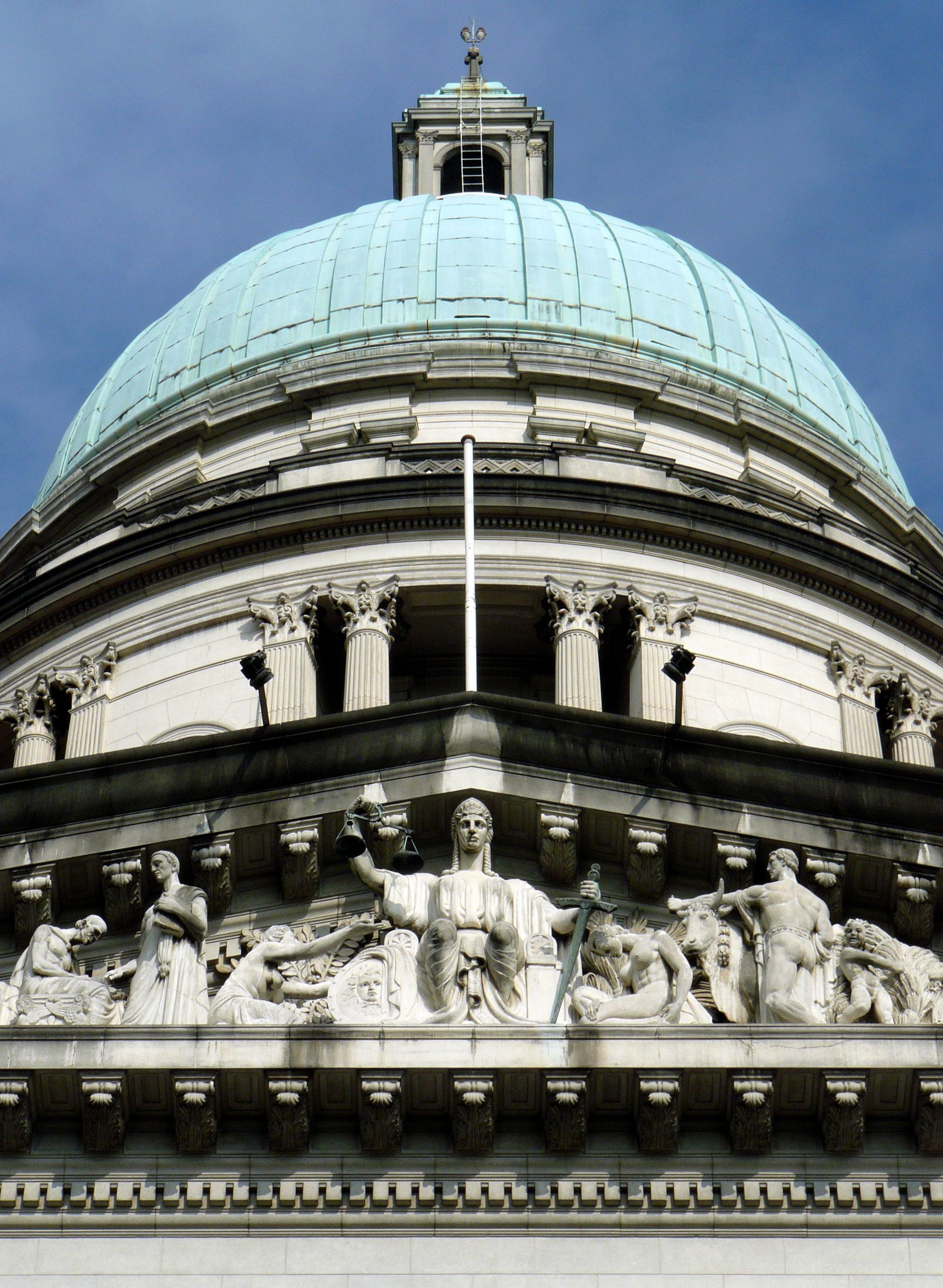
Pediment sculpture, Old Supreme Court Building, Singapore, 1939

Cavaliere Rodolfo Nolli (1888–1963) was an Italian sculptor and stonework contractor from Lombardy, who worked mainly in Southeast Asia during the first half of the 20th century.

== History ==
Born in 1888 in Lombardy, Italy, he was the nephew of the sculptor Vittorio Novi from Lanzo d'Intelvi, a village close to Lake Lugano in northern Italy, province of Como.

Around 1914, Nolli created the marble decoration for the new Mahaiudthit Bridge in Bangkok and also did marble works for the Ananta Samakhom Throne Hall. Here Nolli became his assistant. He would be awarded the Order of the Crown of Italy – a form of knighthood that carried with it the title Cavaliere for his efforts in Siam, whilst based in Singapore in 1925.

In Singapore, Nolli later designed the marble decorations of the College of Medicine Building, Singapore (completed 1926) and of the Old Supreme Court Building (completed 1939). Nolli had also designed the cast iron lamps and lion reliefs of the Elgin Bridge spanning the Singapore river (completed 1929).

From 1950 to 1952 he created two iconic crests for Gan Eng Seng School at Anson Road, which were lost when the school moved to Raeburn Park in 1986. He had formerly crafted the Royal Coat of Arms and a pair of flambeau pieces for the main entrance of the Fullerton Building built in 1924-28. Among his last works in Singapore was a pair of lions for the Bank of China Building, Singapore (1954).

Probably his last commission was the stonework for the huge Omar Ali Saifuddien Mosque in Brunei (completed 1958), which inspired the novel Devil of a State by Anthony Burgess.

He died in 1963 in Italy at the age of 75.
