= Taman Haji Sir Muda Omar 'Ali Saifuddien =

Public park in Brunei

- Padang Besar
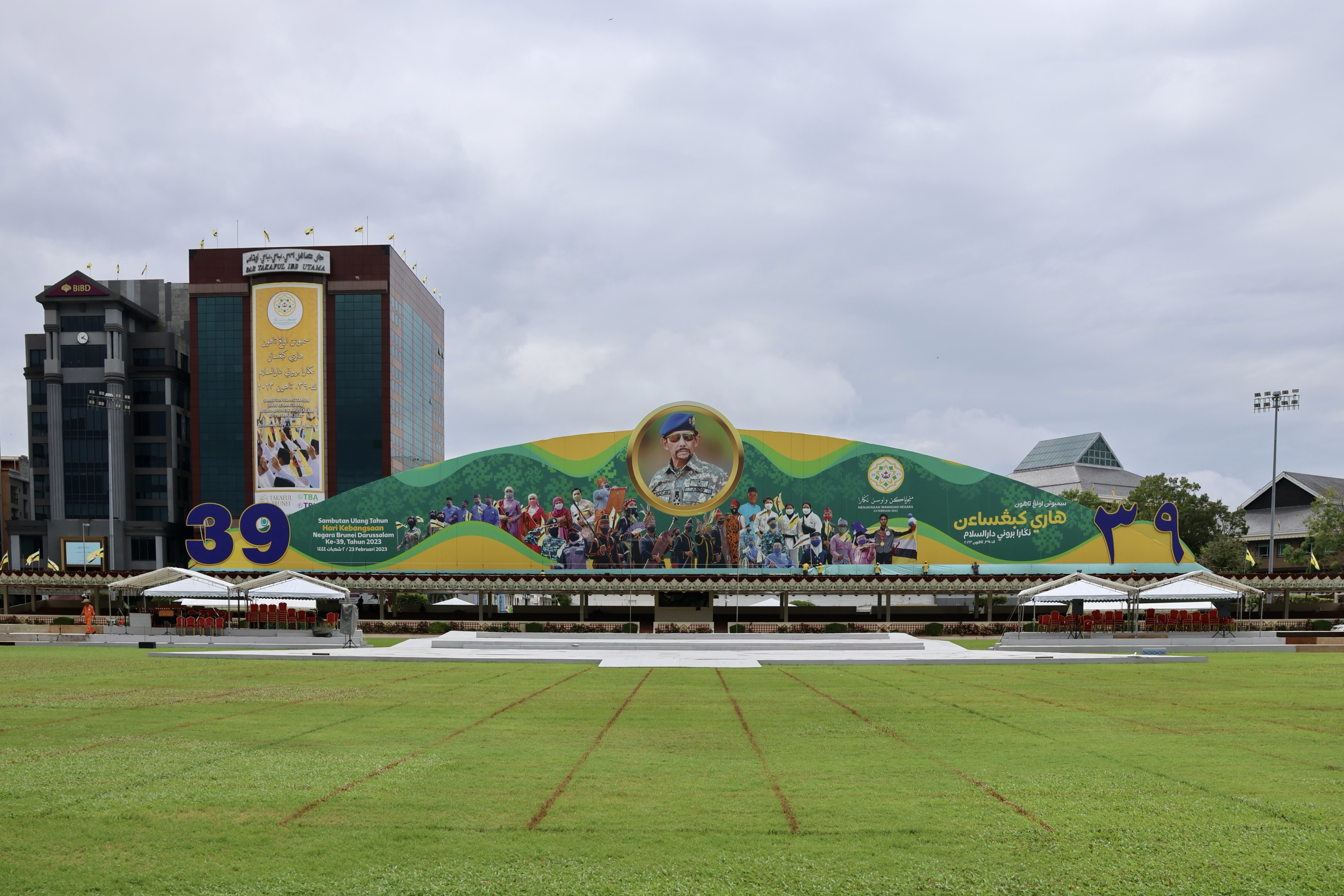
- Taman Haji Sir Muda Omar 'Ali Saifuddien was decorated for the National Day in 2023
- Interactive map of Taman Haji Sir Muda Omar 'Ali Saifuddien
- Type: Urban park
- Location: Pusat Bandar, Bandar Seri Begawan, Brunei
- Coordinates: 4°53′22″N 114°56′29″E
- Etymology: Sultan Omar Ali Saifuddien III
- Manager: Department of Environment, Parks and Recreation (Note: The Ministry of Development's Department of Environment, Parks, and Recreation is in charge of overseeing the nation's recreational areas' upkeep and landscaping.)
- Parking: On site (no charge)

Taman Haji Sir Muda Omar 'Ali Saifuddien is a historical urban park, located in the Pusat Bandar of Bandar Seri Begawan, where significant state ceremonies are held, including the Sultan's birthday celebrations, National Day, the National Musabaqah Al-Quran, and the birthday of Prophet Muhammad, among others. Formerly known as Padang Besar, (Note: The name Padang Besar means Big Field in English.) the park underwent renovations in 1983 and was renamed in honour of Sultan Omar Ali Saifuddien III. This site holds historical importance, as it was the location of Brunei's declaration of independence reading on 1 January 1984.

Taman Haji Sir Muda Omar 'Ali Saifuddien is located across from the Omar Ali Saifuddien Mosque in the capital of Brunei. Other notable buildings surrounding the field include the Secretariat Building and the Community Hall.

== History ==
During the 1960s, Padang Besar served as the hub of Brunei Town's public life, drawing people of all ages for state functions, football games, and national festivities, such as the birthday of Sultan Omar Ali Saifuddien III. State officials, schoolchildren, and security personnel were among the participants. Families were able to take part in the festivities together with traditional puppet performances presented by the Department of Information, while local youth, students, and guest artists provided entertainment in the evenings.

== Features ==
The 10 metres (33 ft)-tall Cendera Lambang Kenangan was built especially for the silver jubilee celebration of Brunei Town's renaming as Bandar Seri Begawan. (Note: Brunei Town was renamed Bandar Seri Begawan on 4 October 1970, during a ceremony conducted in Padang Besar.) This memorial insignia, presented by the Brunei Shell Company, cost about $60,000 and is located within the park. Arkitek Idris contributed its design while working with regional engineers. This structure, which bears the inscription "Bandar Seri Begawan 1970 - 1995," was built to add a three-dimensional garden aspect to the cityscape.

The entrance arch to the park was built around 1980. It is located next to Taman Haji Sir Muda Omar 'Ali Saifuddien, near the Timepiece Monument. Initially, the arch was constructed from wood and coloured plywood. In 1990, it was renovated and rebuilt using concrete materials.

== Events ==
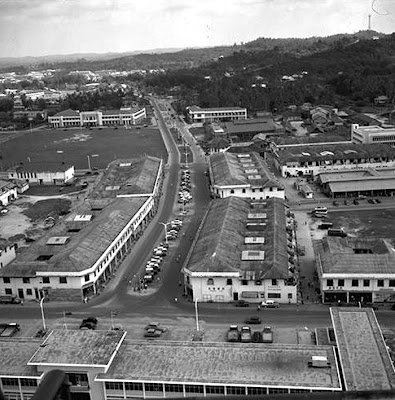
Padang Besar (left) in the 1950s

The inaugural Pupils' Day took place in 1968 in Padang Besar, with Pengiran Muhammad Yusuf, the acting Menteri Besar of Brunei, presiding over the occasion. Students from all four districts participated in dances, cultural shows, and exhibitions during this event, which took the place of the previous Education Week. In August, the field organised festivities to commemorate the coronation of Sultan Hassanal Bolkiah, in which all schools took part.

At exactly 00:01 on 4 October 1970, Brunei Town was legally renamed Bandar Seri Begawan. The statement was made by Pengiran Muhammad Yusuf, the Menteri Besar, during a ceremony held in Padang Besar. In commemoration of this milestone, Besar Sagap composed a song named "Ibu Kota Nan Indah" with lyrics by Abdul Wahab Mohamed.

Before midnight of 1 January 1984, in a special grandstand in the park, Sultan Hassanal Bolkiah declared Brunei to be, once again, an independent nation. Three booming cries of "Allahuakbar," led by Sultan Omar Ali Saifuddien III, signalled the start of the Takbir at the stroke of midnight. The approximately 30,000 spectators who had assembled at Taman Haji Sir Muda Omar 'Ali Saifuddien broke into deafening celebrations. Along with the rhythmic beats of hadrah drums and a 21-gun salute, the phrases "ALLAHU AKBAR" and "MERDEKA NEGARA BRUNEI DARUSSALAM 1984," printed in both Jawi and Roman letters, lighted up the park. The proclamation was followed by a prayer of gratitude from Brunei's Mufti. On this occasion, Brunei formally ended its status as British protectorate and became a Melayu Islam Beraja with complete independence sovereignty, the Sultan now having the last say in foreign affairs.

Sultan Hassanal Bolkiah formally declared in a speech on 31 May 1988, that Sultan Omar Ali Saifuddien III's personal emblem will be replaced with his own. The First and Second Battalions of the Royal Brunei Land Force were presented their new King's and Battalion Colours from the Sultan at a Presentation of Colours event, which took place in Taman Haji Sir Muda Omar 'Ali Saifuddien, commemorating the event with military honour and custom.

== Gallery ==
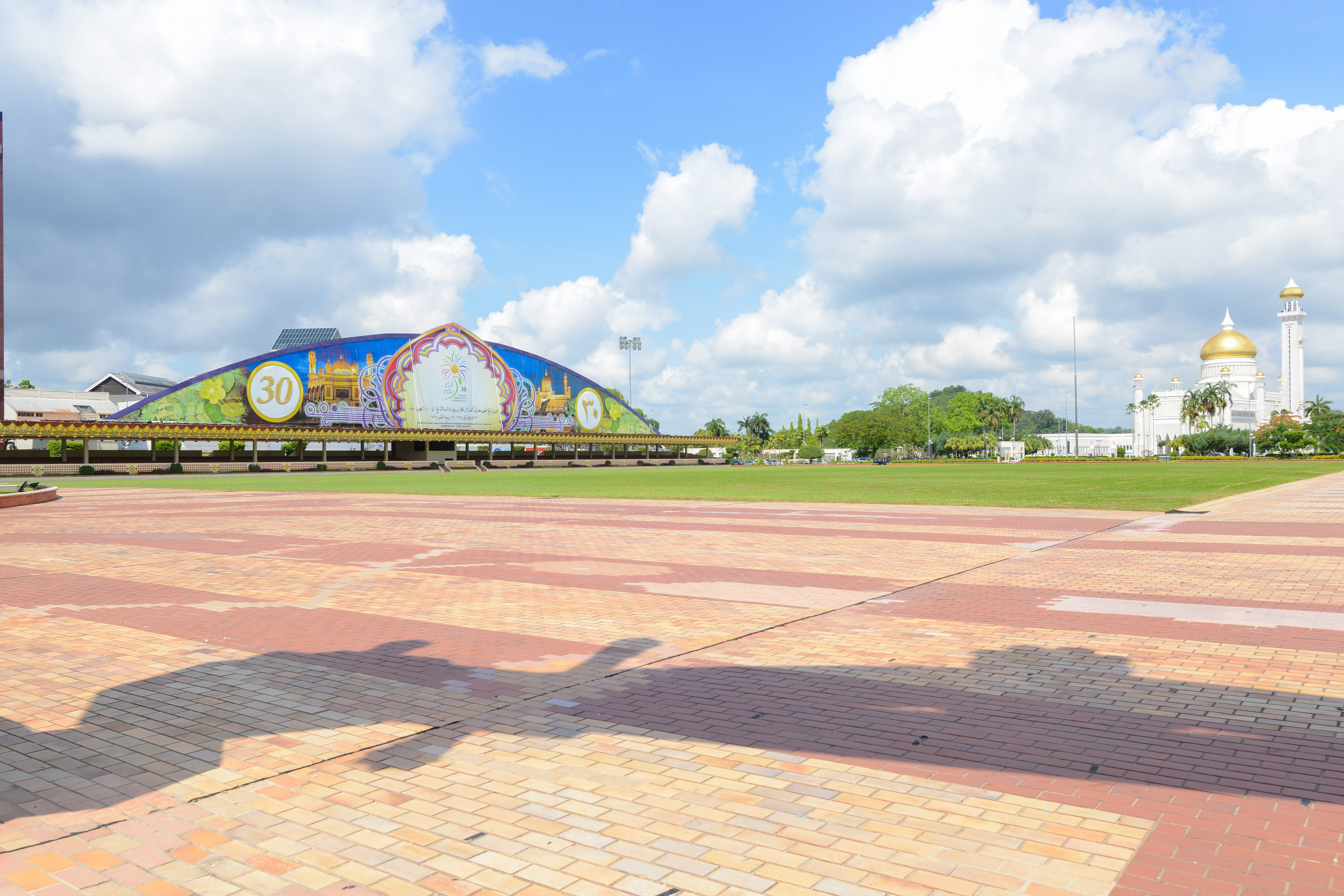
An extended view of the park

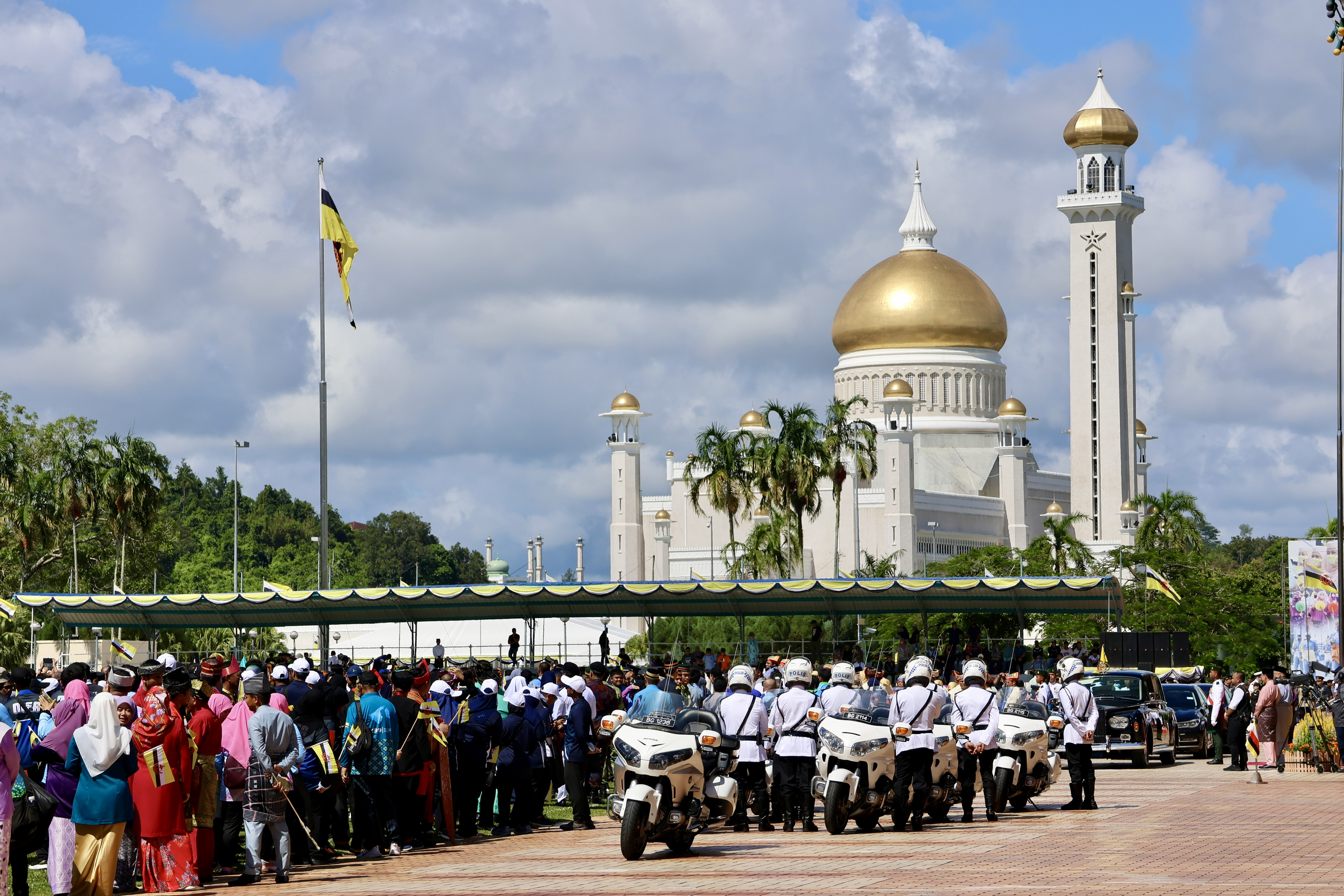
The park with the backdrop of the Omar Ali Saifuddien Mosque

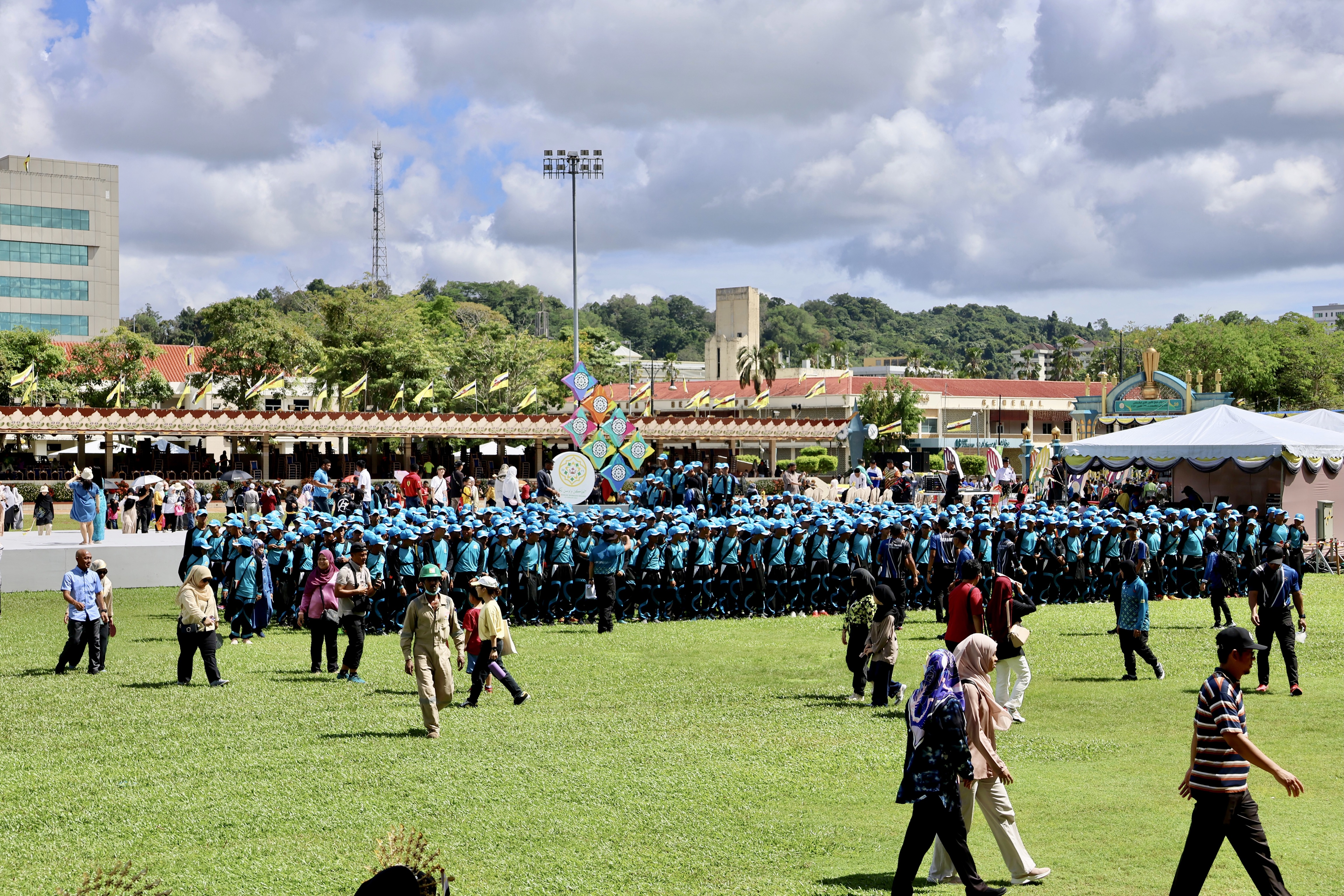
2023 National Day celebration

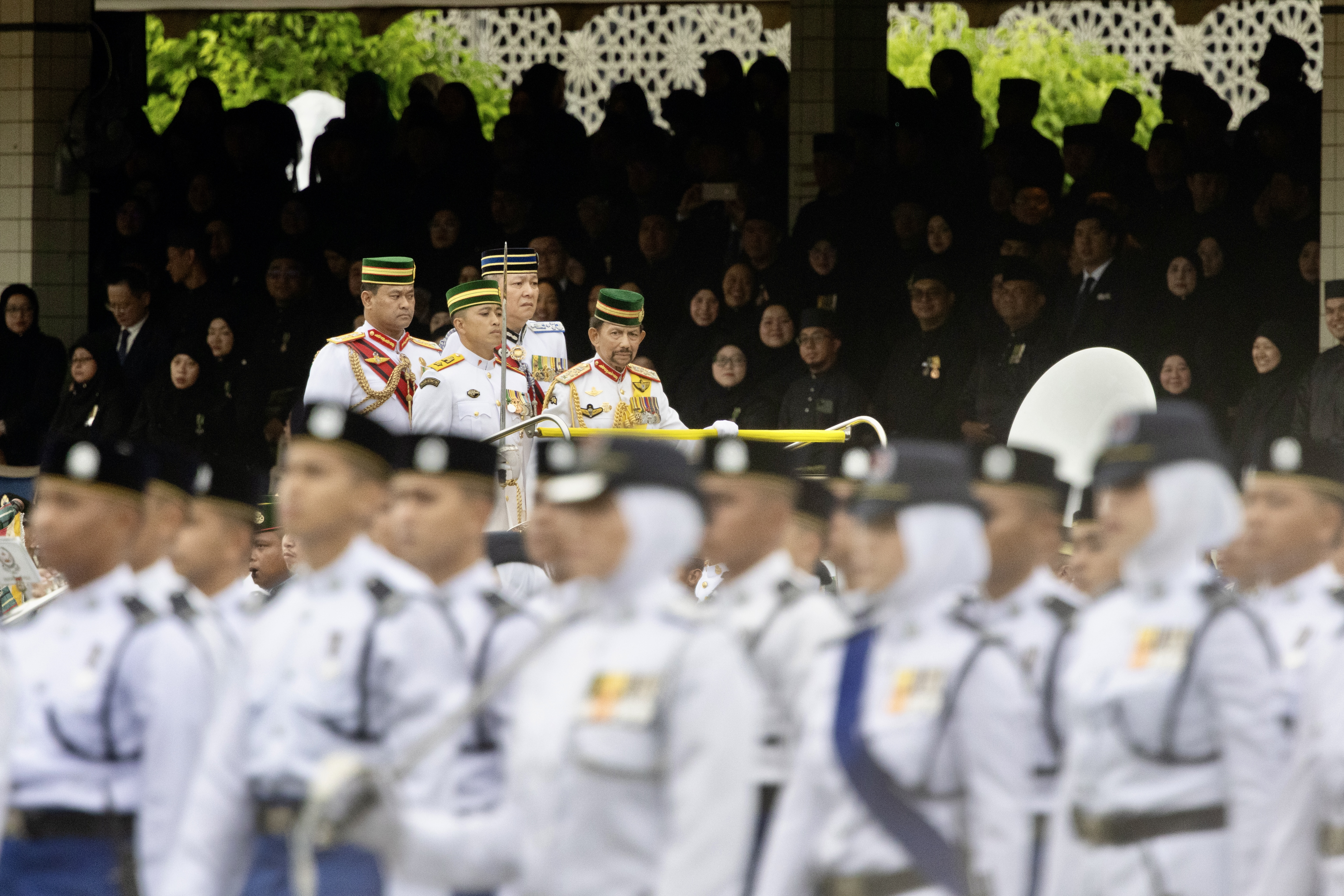
Sultan Hassanal Bolkiah's 78th birthday celebration

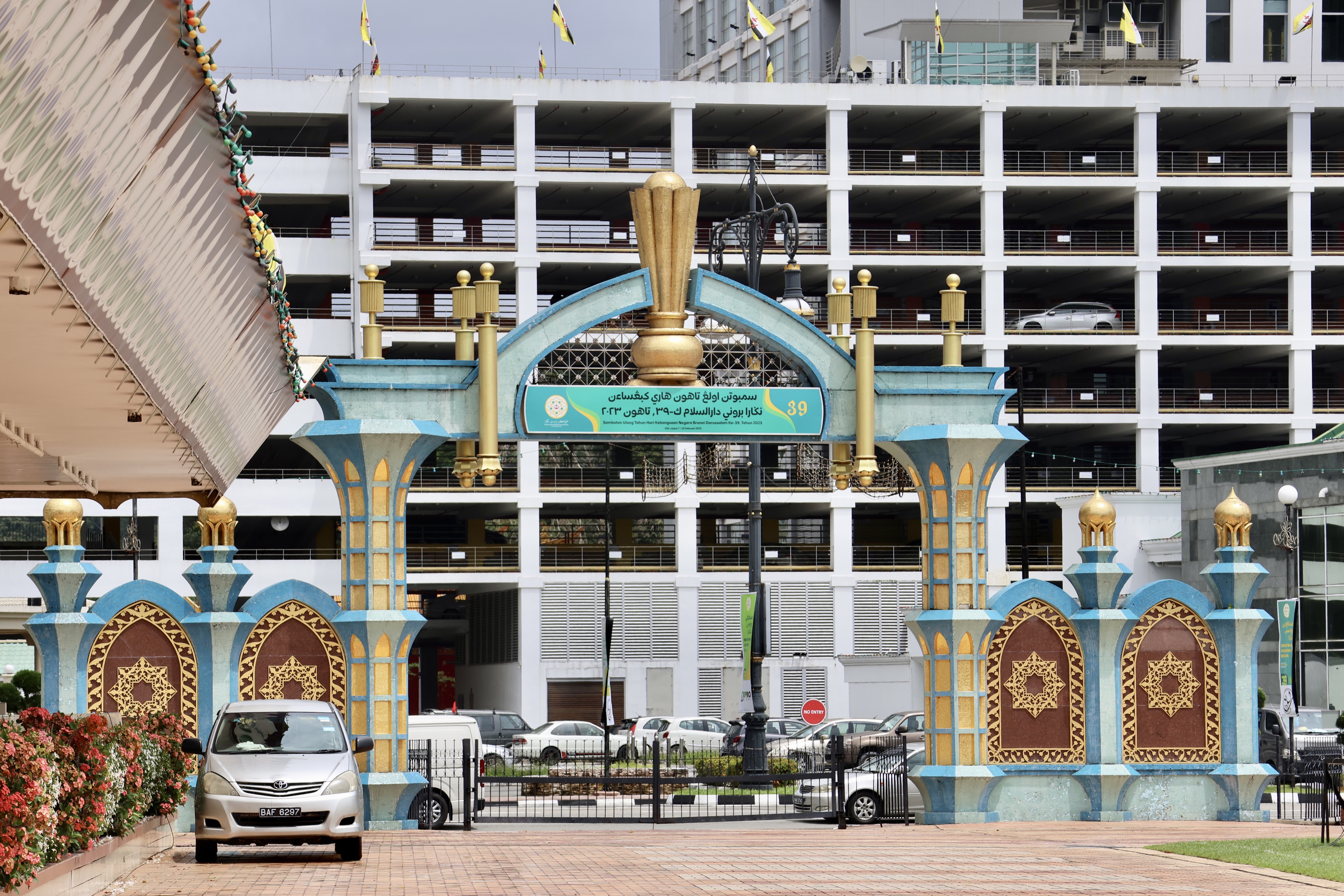
The primary entryway arch

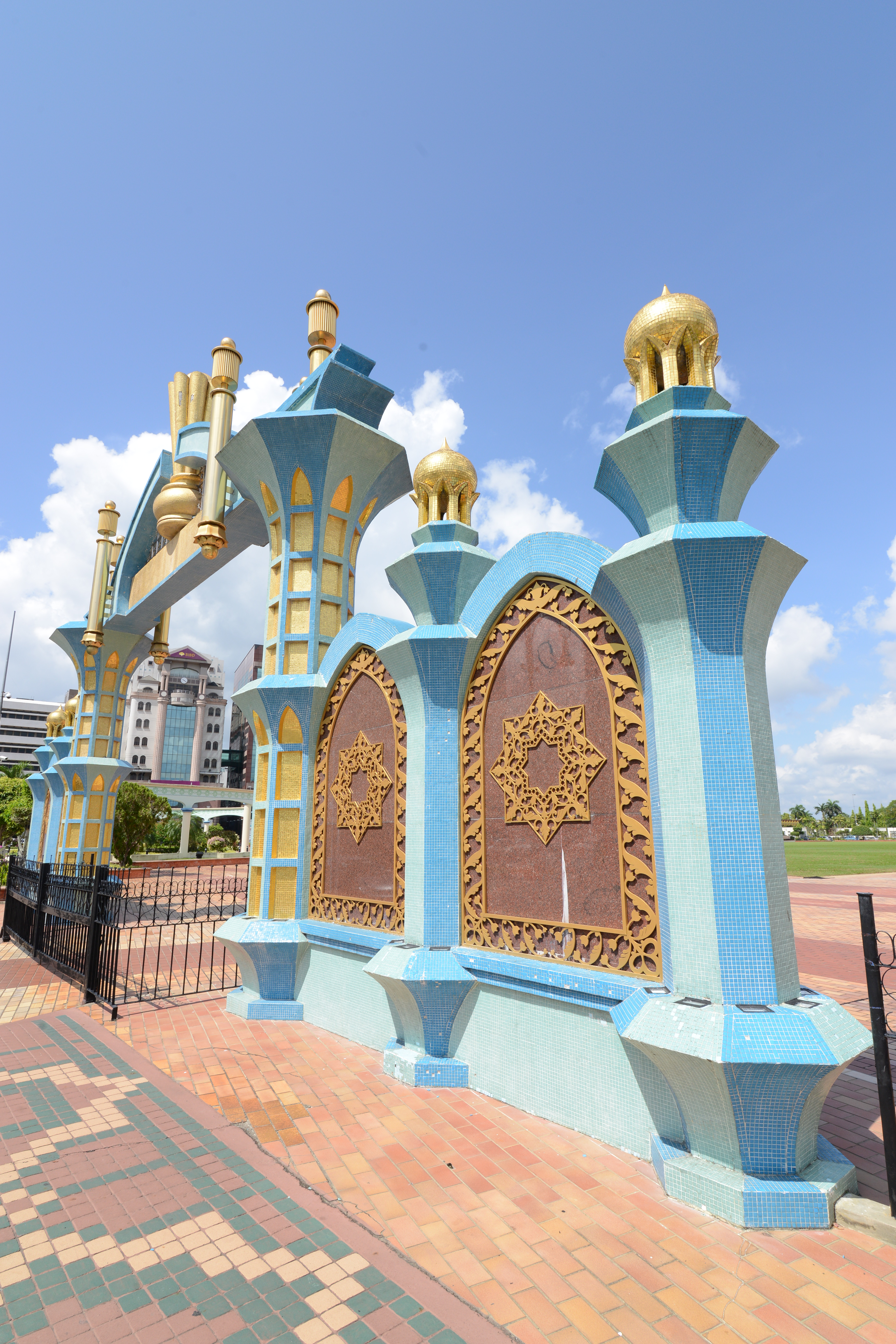
Close-up of the arch
