= Allah Peliharakan Sultan =

National anthem of Brunei

English: God Bless the Sultan
- الله ڤليهاراكن سلطان
- National anthem of Brunei
- Lyrics: Pengiran Muhammad Yusuf, 1947
- Music: Besar Sagap, 1947
- Adopted: 31 May 1951

Audio sample
- U.S. Navy Band instrumental version: file; help

"Allah Peliharakan Sultan" (Note: Jawi: الله ڤليهاراكن سلطان; English: "God Bless the Sultan") is the national anthem of Brunei. It was written by Pengiran Muhammad and composed by Besar Sagap in 1947, and adopted officially in 1951. The national anthem is played throughout the country at all ceremonial events.

== History ==
1984 instrumental rendition in F major

The origins of the anthem date back to 1947, when there was a yearning on the part of some Bruneian youths that their country should have a national anthem, like all the other modern countries. Two youths were entrusted with the task of developing the melody and writing the lyrics. Their combined efforts produced the anthem currently in use. It was composed by Besar Sagap, and the poet was Pengiran Muhammad Yusuf.

Before its formal release, the anthem was also developed further, particularly by Malay teachers. Some of the key figures who contributed included Mohamed Sum Hashim, the first to introduce the melody to Brunei Town Malay school children. The anthem gained popularity when other teachers began to teach it to their students across the state. In a matter of weeks, the melody and lyrics had been committed to memory by a large number of school children. Although yet to be officially accepted, the anthem was being played at public events such as concerts, official openings, and otherceremonies, where it was given the same respect as the British national anthem, "God Save the King".

Royal consent for the anthem was provided in 1947 when Sultan Ahmad Tajuddin attended a flag-raising ceremony at Brunei Town as part of the anniversary celebration of the political party Barisan Pemuda. During the ceremony, the Sultan broke the party's standard to the tune of the anthem played by Besar, an early acceptance of what would become the national anthem. After Sultan Omar Ali Saifuddien III was crowned on 6 June 1950, the issue of the composition of the national anthem was reopened. The anthem was officially adopted at latter's coronation on 31 May 1951. (Note: However, an official government source states that the anthem was formally adopted in 1952.)

== Usage ==
The national anthem is played each morning early breakfast on radio and television by Radio Televisyen Brunei (RTB) and at the sign-on and sign-off of its transmission for the day.

== Lyrics ==
Malay original

Ya Allah lanjutkanlah Usia
Kebawah Duli Yang Maha Mulia
Adil berdaulat menaungi nusa
Memimpin rakyat kekal bahagia
Hidup sentosa Negara dan Sultan (Note: The earlier version of the verse has the word rakyat ("people") in place of sultan.)
Ilahi selamatkan Brunei Darussalam

Jawi script

يا الله لنجوتکنله اوسيا
کباوه دولي يڠ مها مليا
عاديل بردولت مناءوڠي نوسا
مميمڤين رعيت ککل بهاݢيا
هيدوڤ سنتوسا نݢارا دان سلطان
الهي سلامتکن بروني دارالسلام

English translation

God bless His Majesty
With a long life
Justly and nobly rule the kingdom
And lead our people happily forever
Peacefully be, the Kingdom and Sultan
Lord, save Brunei, the abode of peace

Za'aba Spelling (Pre-1972)

Ya Allah lanjutkan-lah usiă
Kĕbawah duli yang maha muliă
Adil bĕrdaulat mĕnaungi nusă
Mĕmimpin ra'yat kĕkal bahagiă
Hidup sĕntosă nĕgară dan sultan
Ilahi sĕlamatkan Brunei Darussalam
