= Omar Ali Saifuddien Mosque =

National mosque of Brunei

- Masjid Omar Ali Saifuddien
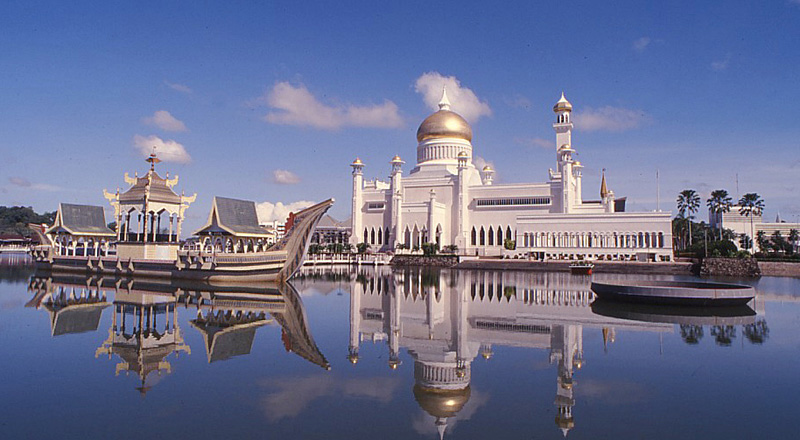
- The mosque in 2007

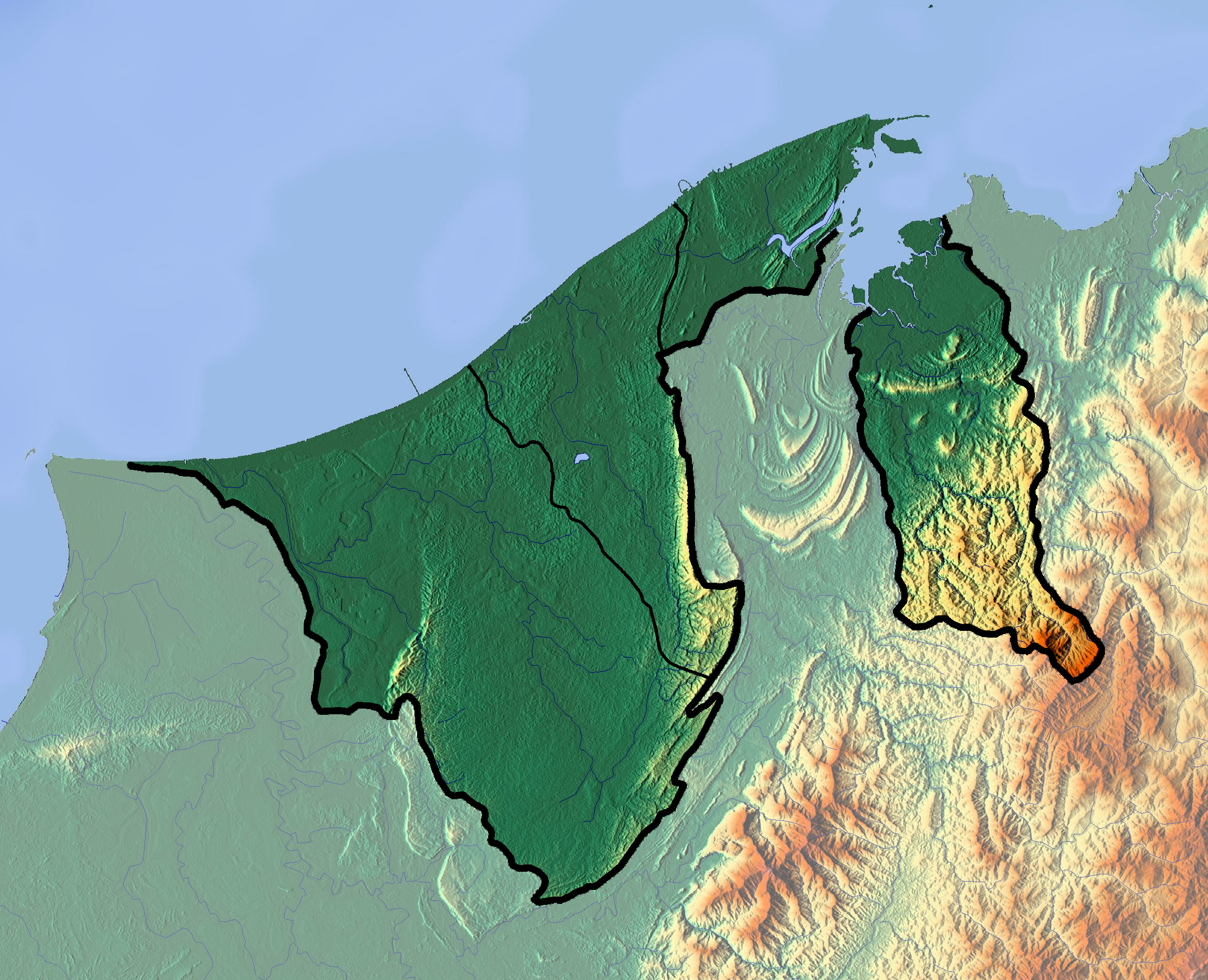
- Location of the mosque in Brunei

Religion
- Affiliation: Sunni Islam
- Ownership: Government of Brunei
- Governing body: Department of Mosque Affairs (Note: Every mosque in the country is governed by the Department of Mosque Affairs of the Ministry of Religious Affairs.)
- Status: Active

Location
- Location: Pusat Bandar, Bandar Seri Begawan
- Country: Brunei
- Interactive map of Omar Ali Saifuddien Mosque
- Coordinates: 4°53′22″N 114°56′21″E

Architecture
- Architects: Rudolfo Nolli; Booty Edwards & Partners; Sultan Omar Ali Saifuddien III
- Type: mosque
- Style: Eclectic-Mughal architecture
- Founder: Sultan Omar Ali Saifuddien III
- Groundbreaking: 4 February 1954
- Completed: 1958
- Construction cost: US$5 million

Specifications
- Capacity: 3,000 worshippers
- Length: 69 m (225 ft)
- Width: 26 m (86 ft)
- Height (max): 171 ft (52 m)
- Dome: 1
- Minaret: 5
- Minaret height: 51 m (166 ft)
- Site area: 2.0 ha (5 acres)
- Materials: Concrete; steel; Italian marble; granite; ceramic tiles; copper; gold leaf; Venetian glass

The Omar Ali Saifuddien Mosque (Malay: Masjid Omar Ali Saifuddien). or unofficially Sultan Omar Ali Saifuddin Mosque (abbreviated as the SOAS Mosque), is a mosque in Bandar Seri Begawan, the capital of Brunei. It is one of the two state mosques (masjid negara), the other being Jame' Asr Hassanil Bolkiah Mosque. One of the biggest and most striking mosques in the Far East, it was completed in 1958 at a cost of US$5 million, built by the eponymous Omar Ali Saifuddien III, the 28th Sultan of Brunei.

The mosque's design was significantly influenced by Mughal architecture; and it is recognisable by its gold dome that dominates the city's skyline. Situated in a man-made lagoon with a ceremonial stone barge, the mosque has become one of the most photographed icons in the country. The interior is decorated with rugs from Saudi Arabia and walls made of Italian marble. The mosque is a popular tourist destination due to its façade, but its main purpose is to be a place of worship.

== History ==
According to stories, Rudolfo Nolli, an Italian artist and architect, created the mosque based on an initial drawing created by Sultan Omar Ali Saifuddien III. In 1952, a committee was established to identify a suitable site for the mosque, chaired by Pengiran Bendahara Pengiran Anak Muhammad Yasin. With the help of a contractor, Sino-Malayan Engineer, and comprehensive architectural designs created by the Malaysian-based Booty and Edward Chartered Architects, the construction began on 4 February 1954. (Note: The architectural firm involved in the construction was the Malaysia-based Booty Edwards & Partners, whereas the consulting firm was the Singapore-based Steen, Sehested and Partners.) The consulting firm was the Singapore-based Steen, Sehested and Partners.

Sultan Omar Ali Saifuddien III provided the first concepts for the mosque designs, which draughtsman Haji Besar bin Sagap put down on paper. Since Padang Besar (present day Taman Haji Sir Muda Omar 'Ali Saifuddien) was utilised for large meetings, it was first proposed that this was the location of the mosque. For the sake of the Kampong Ayer people, the Sultan, however, requested that it be in the current location close to the Brunei River. The Sultan announced the first National Development Plan (RKN 1) when he built the mosque.

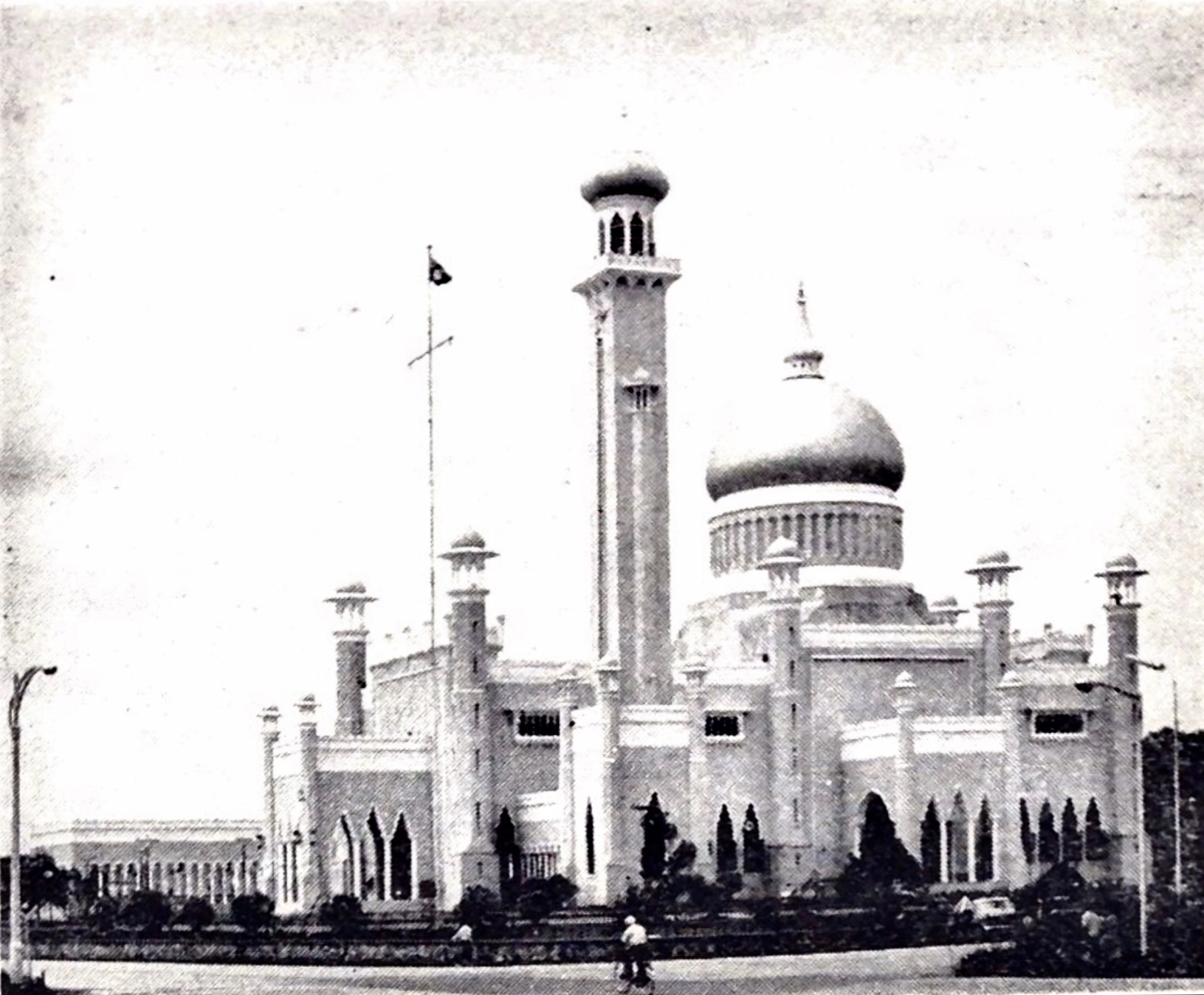
The mosque in c. 1970

The construction used 1,400 tonnes (1,500 short tons) of concrete and 640 tonnes (700 short tons) of steel, with its foundation piles measuring between 24–37 metres (80–120 ft). The mosque was completed in five years, and it was officially opened by the Sultan on 26 September 1958, in conjunction to his 42nd birthday celebration. Hassan Azhari sang the call to prayer at the mosque's opening. The opening ceremony was attended by Malay Sultans, state dignitaries, the Prime Minister and Deputy Prime Minister of Malaysia, the Governor General of Southeast Asia, and representatives from the British government, and it was notably the first news reported over the radio in the country at that time.

Between 30 December 1959 and 3 January 1960, Anwar Musaddad gave several lectures in the mosque. The mosque's barge was inaugurated on 18 December 1967 in conjunction with the 1,400th anniversary of Nuzul Al-Quran. Prominent visitors to the mosque include Queen Elizabeth II in 1972, (Note: Accompanying the queen's visit were Prince Philip and Princess Anne.) Pierre Trudeau in 1983, Muhammad Zia-ul-Haq in the mid-1980s, Prince Salman bin Abdul Aziz in 1998, and Narendra Modi in 2024.

During the construction of the Jame' Asr Hassanil Bolkiah Mosque, in January 1994 the first renovation of the mosque was completed, and involved the installation of air conditioning and decorative glass with verses from the Al-Quran on the small windows of the domes, some of which displayed the Asma' Allah al-Husna. The mosque's previous glassless windows allowed fresh air to circulate inside.

The mosque has hosted a number of important occasions in Brunei's history, such as the 31 December 1983 mass thanksgiving prayer on the declaration of Independence Day. It remains the main venue for the solemnisation of royal weddings and mass prayers of gratitude on National Day. Among the notable royal marriages that have been solemnised in the mosque include Sultan Hassanal Bolkiah in 1965; Crown Prince Al-Muhtadee Billah in 2004; Princess Rashidah Sa'adatul in 1996; and Princess Majeedah Nuurul in 2007.

== Design and features ==
=== Structure ===
The mosque's general architectural style is primarily influenced by the Mughal Empire, (Note: The architecture of the mosque is frequently characterised as a fusion of modernism and Mughal architecture.) with Islamic and Bruneian architectural elements accented throughout the structure's façade and interior. The mosque's features include the mihrab, mimbar, prayer hall and dome, minaret, ablution area, and sahn. Nolli created all of the architectural elements, including the pillars with their distinctive Bruneian motif, a thick rope or kalat. This pattern is a reflection of the columns in Lapau. A square fountain pool with green and yellow tiles creating a songket weave (tenunan) pattern can be seen outside in the courtyard on the left.

The mosque, which measures 69 by 26 metres (225 by 86 ft) and can hold 3,000 worshipers, features an area for ablution that is surrounded by kalat pillars that are evocative of historic Andalusian palaces. Islamic art, including Arabic calligraphy, geometric patterns, floral motifs, trefoil arches, and Quranic passages, adorn the mosque's interior as visitors enter through its copper doors. The mihrab marks the direction of Mecca (qibla) and is located at the far end of the prayer hall. It is here that the imam leads the assembly in prayer. The mosque's central architectural and symbolic element, the mihrab, is adorned with gold mosaics and abstract floral designs. Its ceiling is a circular design with Quranic passages.

The mimbar, which the Sultan created, is a two-story pulpit in the mosque where the Imam gives sermons. The al-Muazzin, who invites people to prayer, uses the first step while the imam uses the second level. Together with the four lesser minarets, the 51-metre-tall (166 ft) main minaret, the highest in the nation, represents the five pillars of Islam and amplifies the call to prayer. The prayer hall is located beneath the 52-metre-tall (171 ft) golden dome and is decorated with handcrafted Axminster carpets from Saudi Arabia and Belgium. There is also a second royal prayer chamber for royal family members on the top right level that may be reached via escalator.

The mosque's other furnishings consisted of the S$200,000 Italian marble covering its floors and columns, Shanghai granite, English chandeliers, and stained glass, are combined. The dome's curving surface covered in a mosaic made of more than three million Venetian glass pieces is perched above the cream-coloured building. Anthony Burgess said in his memoirs that the dome was coated in gold leaf, which came away in flakes as the building contracted and expanded, giving the local fishermen the impression that the gold was a gift from Allah. An elevator up the 44-metre-tall (144 ft) minaret was also built. The chandelier of 4.6 metres (15 ft) in diameter and weighing more than 3 tonnes (3.3 short tons); it holds 62 fluorescent tubes, with an addition of 480 tubes for the interior.

=== Mahligai and lagoon ===
Situated next to the Kedayan River and surrounded by a man-made lagoon, the mosque represents a bridge connecting the country's past and present. The most famous example is the concrete re-creation of Sultan Bolkiah's boat, a 16th century Mahligai (royal barge) on the lagoon. This B$500,000 barge, which has been accessible since 1967, is based on the traditional longboats used for warfare, memorial services, and royal celebrations by the Borneo's indigenous people. Its central hypostyle pavilion, stern, and bow are designed like birds, and its roof is pyramidal. These jars are commonly found in European drawings, woodcarvings, cloth paintings, and murals. The lagoon around the mosque and its boat path are ornamented with ridges that mimic the ancient shield known as the kelasak. Bruneian textile weaving patterns and royal regalia serve as the inspiration for the boat's elaborate floral and vegetal decorations. The main pavilion's finial features Sultan Sharif Ali's royal emblem. Mosaics that imitate the vibrant hues, intricate patterns, and motifs of Brunei's songket textiles, which are highly valued and essential to royal customs, are also used to decorate the mosque's water fountain and ablution area.

== Gallery ==
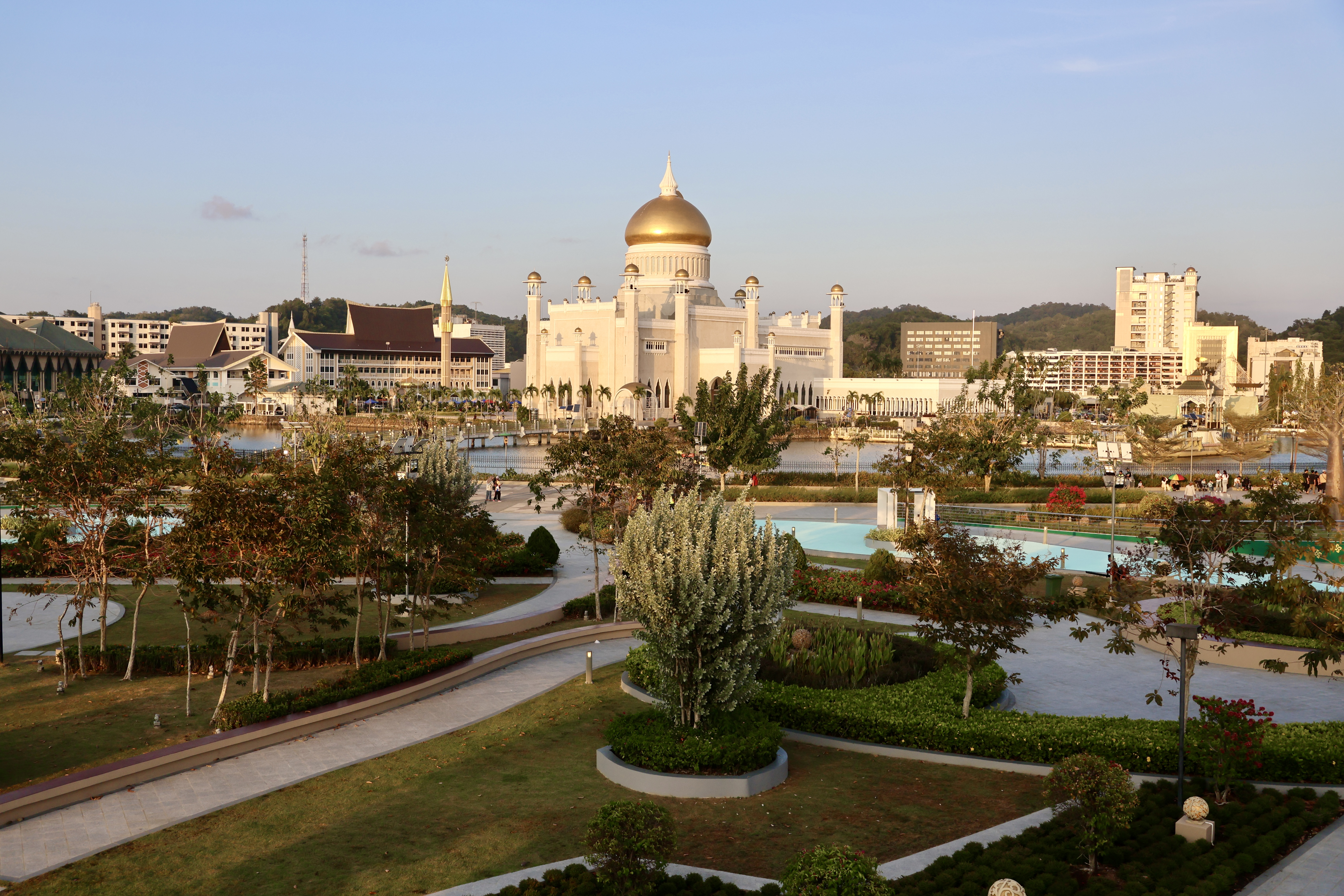
The mosque seen from Taman Mahkota Jubli Emas

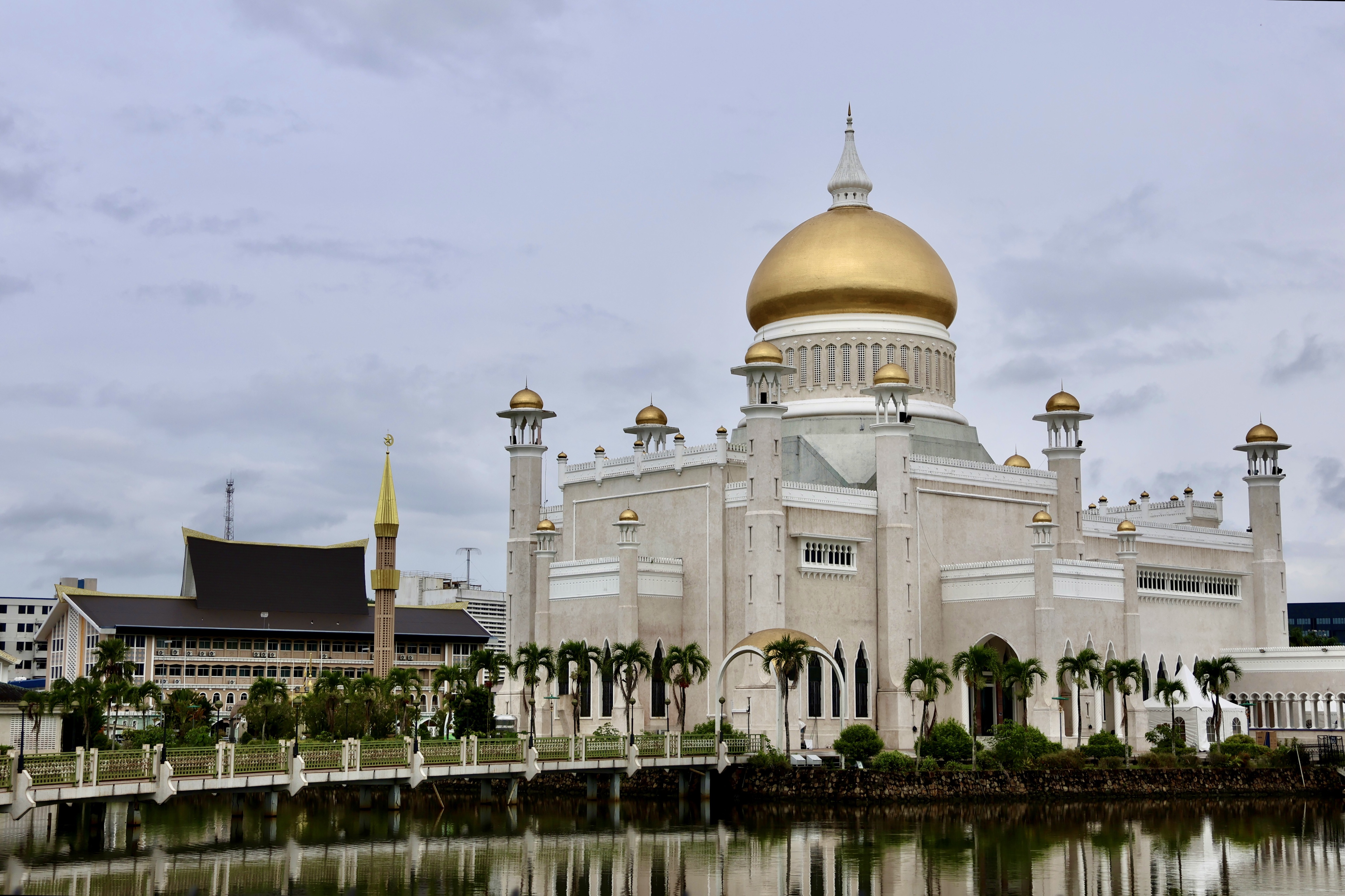
The Department of Mosque Affairs building alongside the mosque

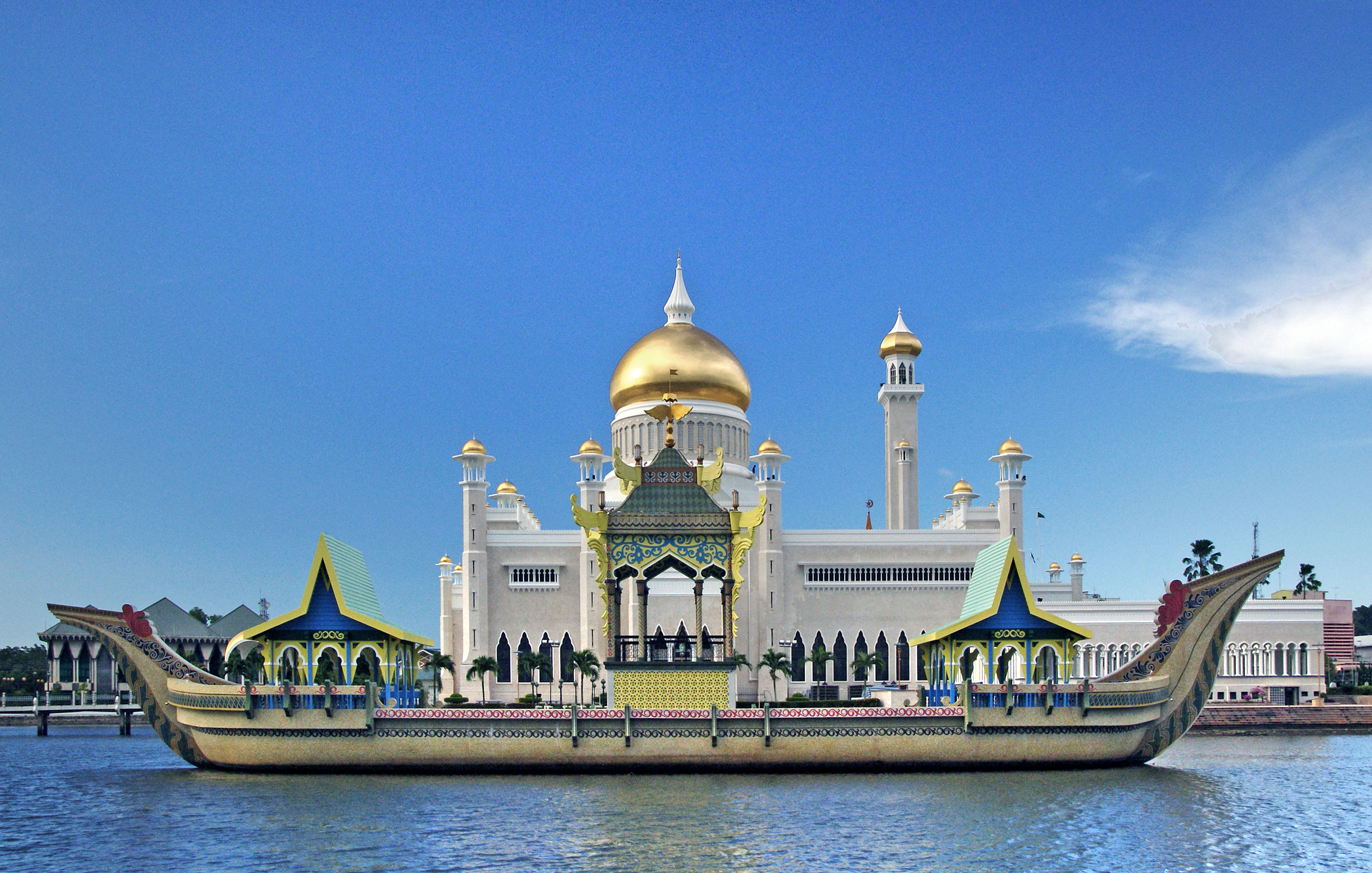
The mosque and the palace barge (Bahtera Mahligai) in the foreground

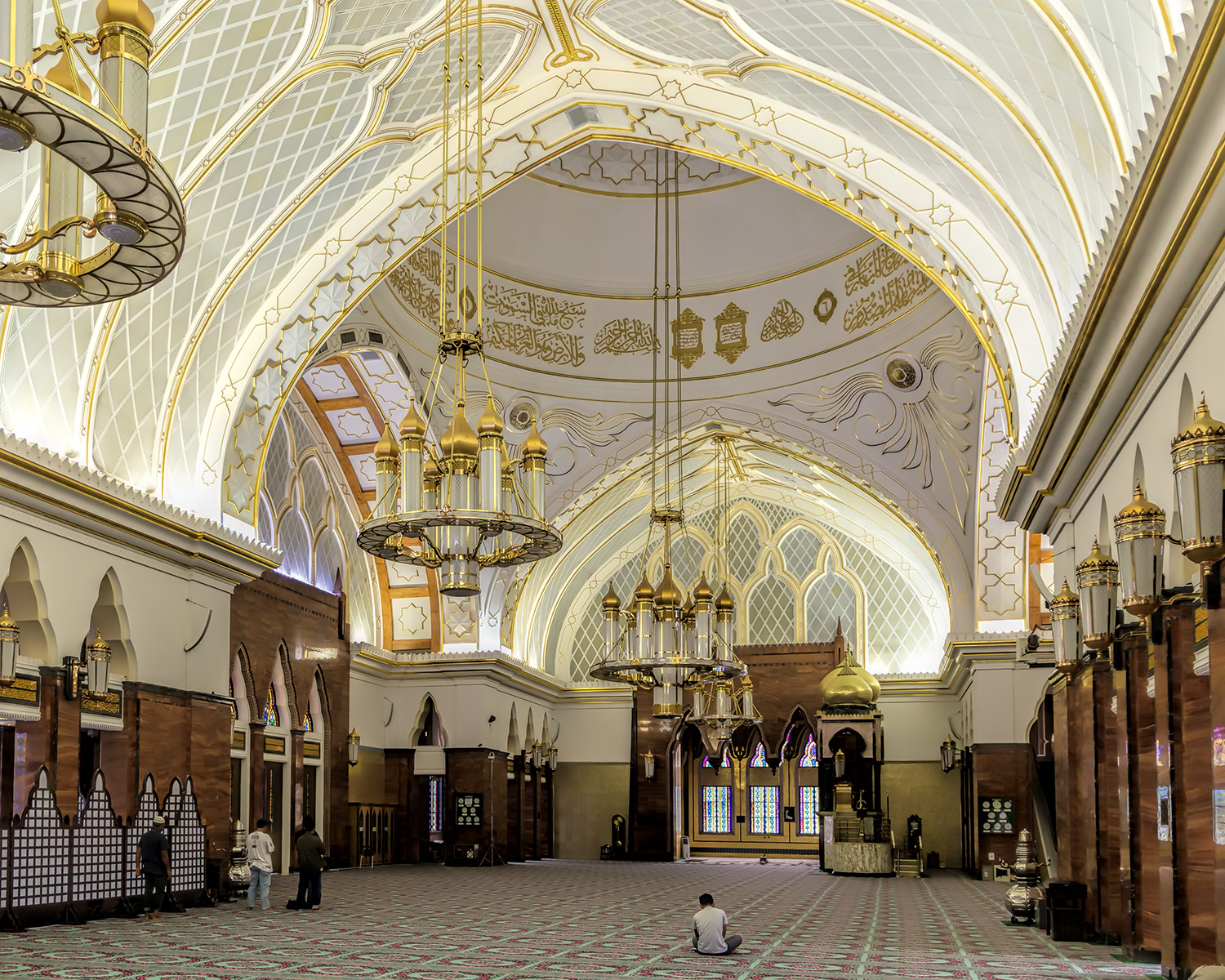
The mosque's prayer hall

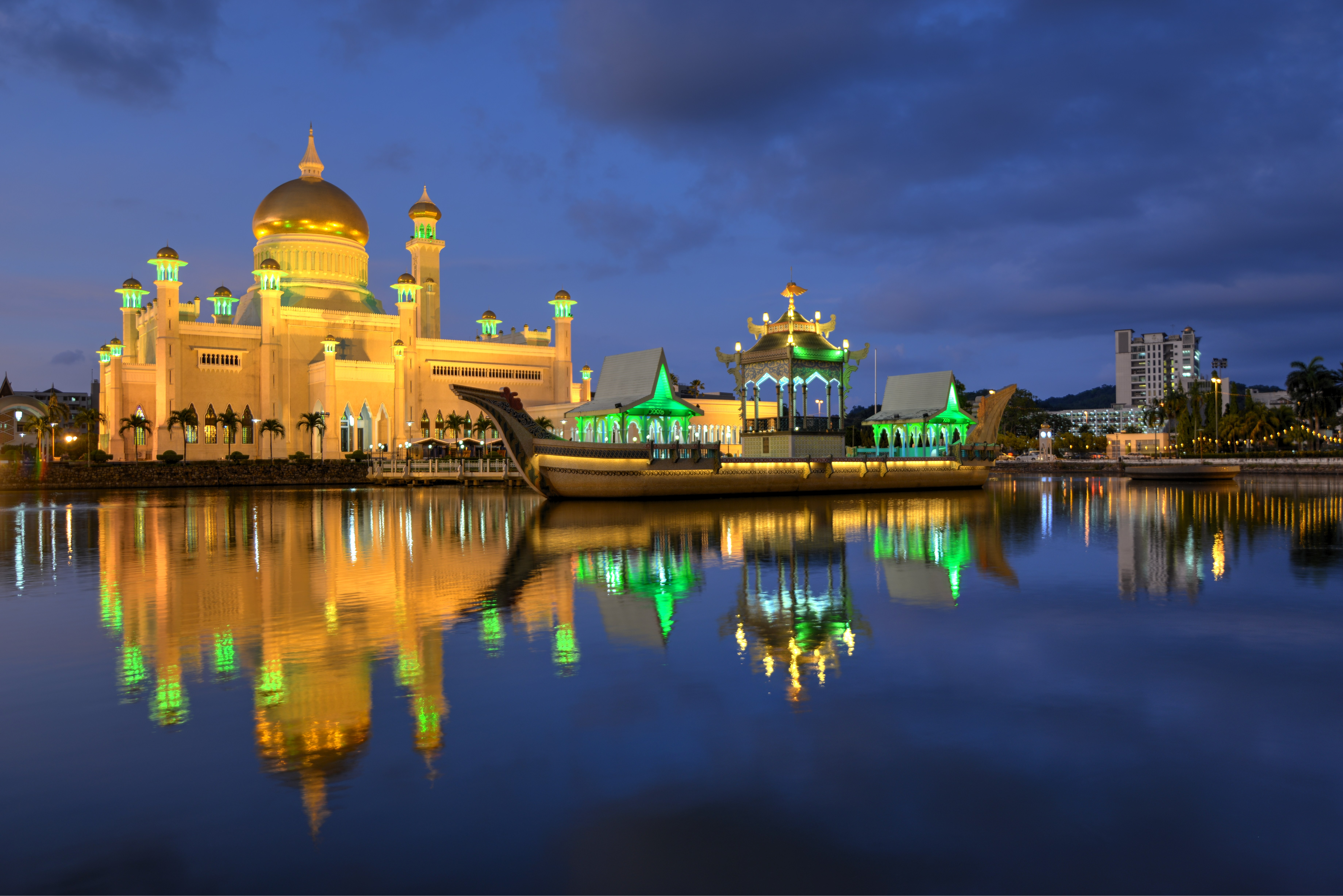
The mosque at dusk

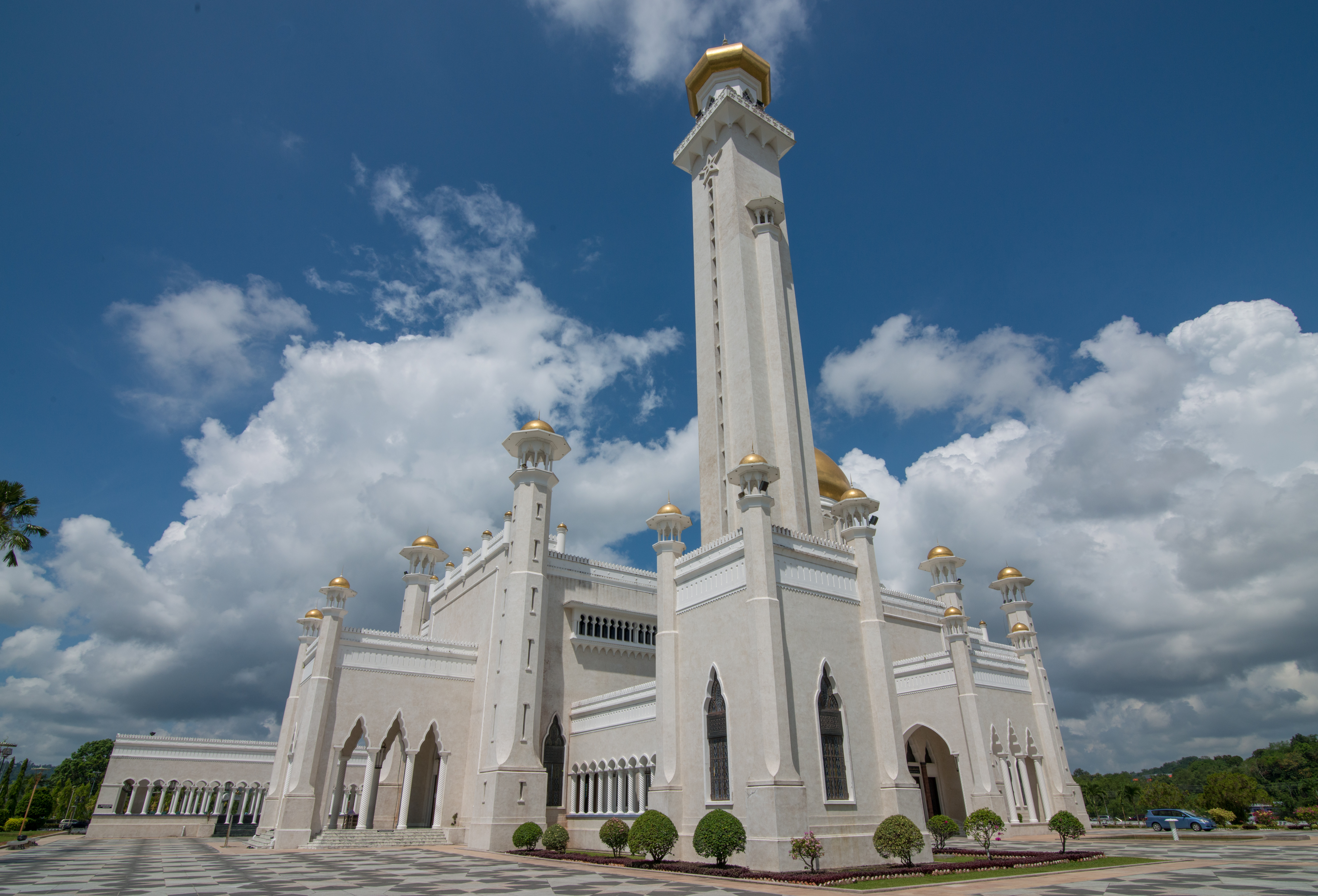
Close-up of the minarets

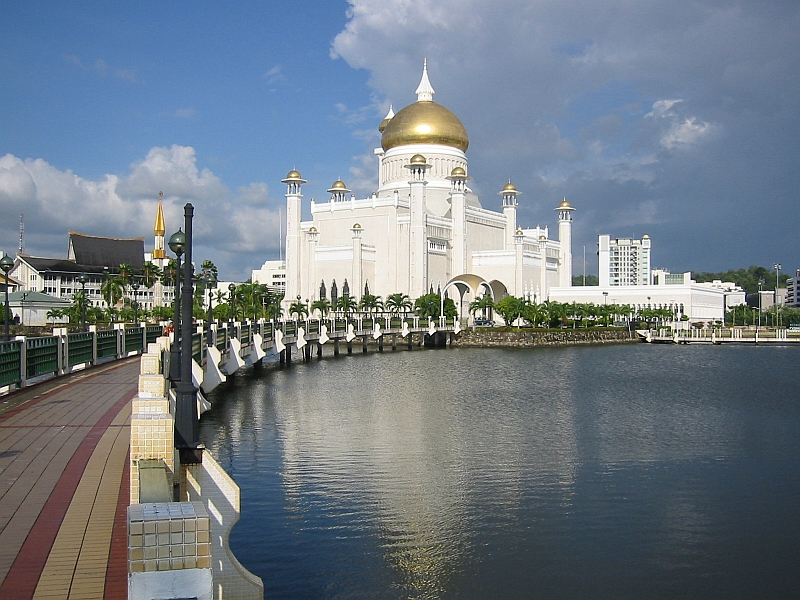
Day view of the mosque (2002)

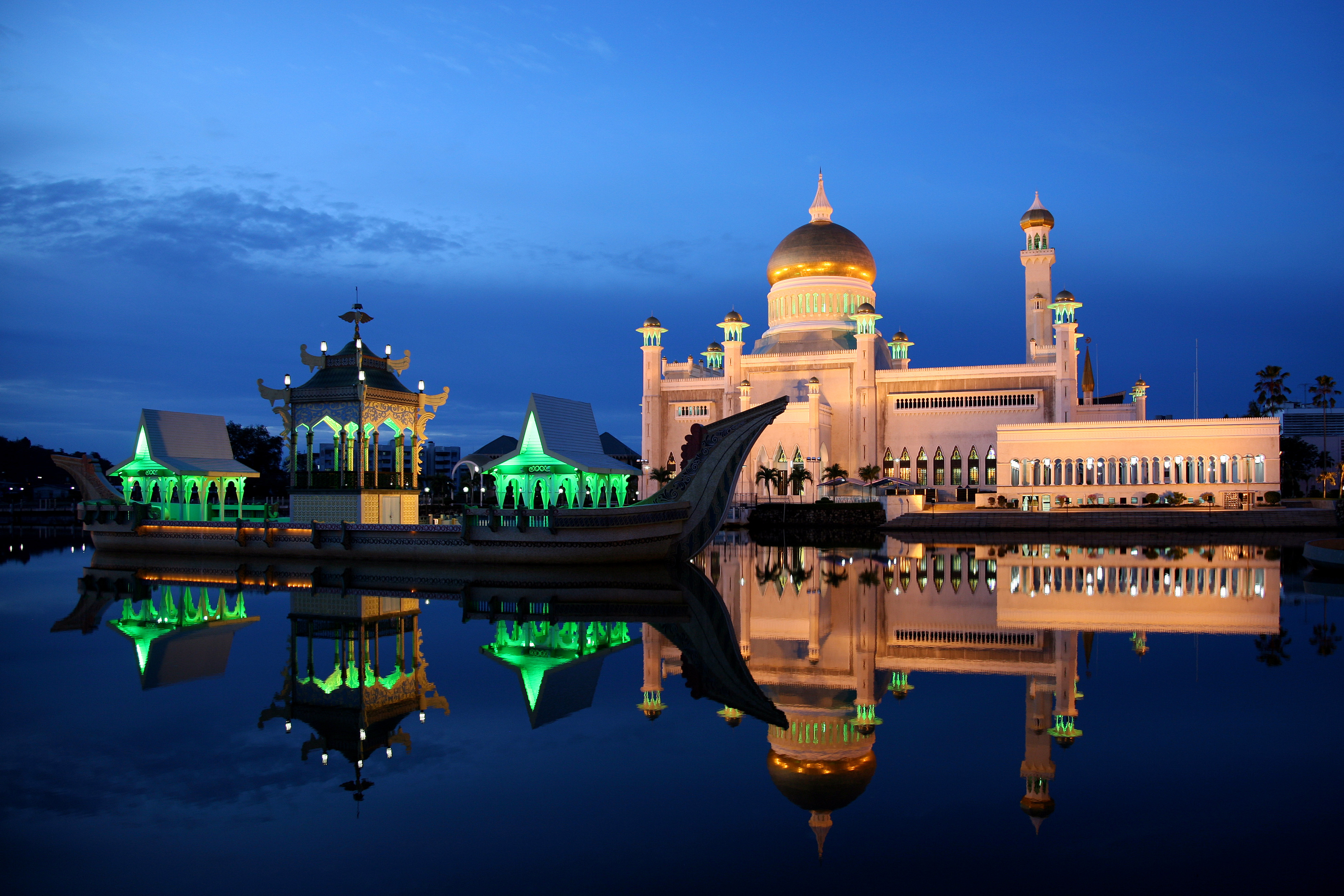
Night view of the mosque (2007)

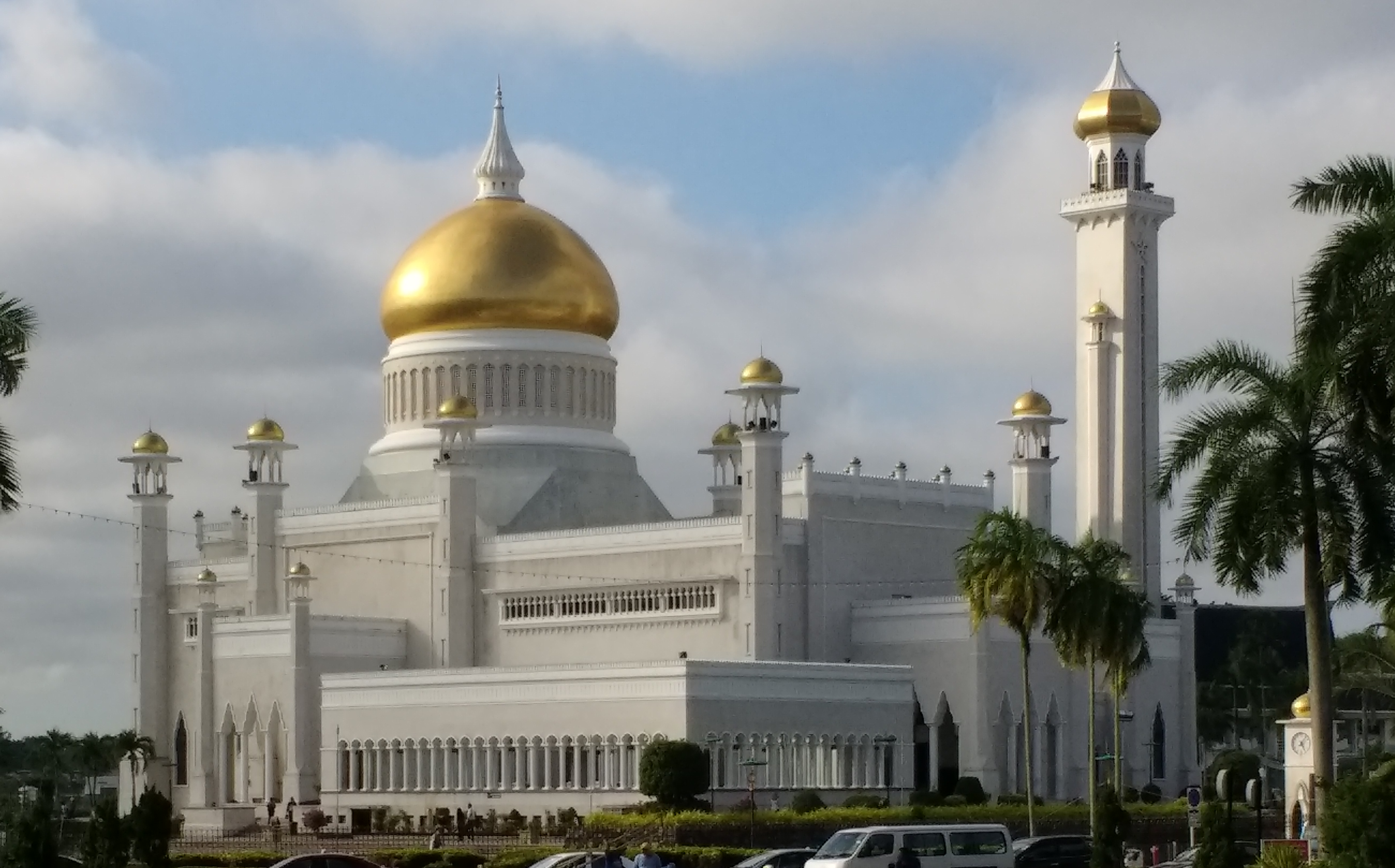
Close-up of the mosque (2019)
