= Brunei Cabinet 1986 =

- Date formed: 26 October 1986
- Date dissolved: 1988

People and organisations
- Sultan and Yang Di-Pertuan Negara: Hassanal Bolkiah
- Prime Minister: Hassanal Bolkiah
- Total no. of members: 11

History
- Election: None
- Predecessor: Brunei Cabinet 1984
- Successor: Brunei Cabinet 1988

The Council of Ministers 1986–1988 is the second cabinet of the Government of Brunei from 1986 to 1988. The cabinet was formed by the titah of Sultan Hassanal Bolkiah on 26 October 1986 after the demise of Sultan Haji Omar Ali Saifuddien III.

== List of ministers ==
Below are the list of members in the Council from 20 October 1986:

| Portfolio | Holder | |
|---|---|---|
| Prime Minister (Also Defence) | HM Sultan Haji Hassanal Bolkiah Mu’izzaddin Waddaulah | |
| Special Advisor to His Majesty the Sultan in the Prime Minister Office | YB Pehin Orang Kaya Laila Setia Bakti Diraja Dato Laila Utama Haji Awang Isa bin Awang Ibrahim | |
| Ministry | Minister | Deputy |
| Defence | HM Sultan Haji Hassanal Bolkiah Mu’izzaddin Waddaulah | Pengiran Sanggamara Diraja Brigadier Jeneral Pengiran Haji Ibnu bin Pengiran Haji Apong |
| Foreign Affairs | HRH Paduka Seri Pengiran Perdana Wazir Sahibul Himmah Wal-Waqar Pengiran Muda Mohamed Bolkiah | Dato Seri Laila Jasa Awang Haji Zakaria bin Haji Awang Sulaiman |
| Finance | HRH Paduka Seri Pengiran Digadong Sahibul Mal Pengiran Muda Jefri Bolkiah | Dato Paduka Seri Laila Jasa Awang Haji Ahmad Wally Skinner |
| Home Affairs | YB Pehin Orang Kaya Laila Setia Bakti Diraja Dato Laila Utama Haji Awang Isa bin Awang Ibrahim | Dato Paduka Awang Haji Abidin bin Orang Kaya Periwara Abdul Rashid |
| Communications | YB Pehin Orang Kaya Laila Wijaya Dato Seri Setia Haji Awang Abdul Aziz bin Awang Umar | |
| Law | YAM Pengiran Laila Kanun Diraja Pengiran Bahrin bin Haji Abbas | |
| Education | YB Pehin Orang Kaya Setia Pahlawan Dato Seri Setia Awang Abdul Rahman bin Haji Mohamed Taib | Dato Seri Laila Jasa Awang Haji Ahmad bin Haji Jumat |
| Religious Affairs | YB Pehin Orang Kaya Ratna Diraja Dato Seri Utama Ustaz Haji Awang Mohd.Zain bin Haji Serudin | Pehin Siraja Khatib Dato Paduka Seri Setia Ustaz Haji Awang Yahya bin Haji Ibrahim, |
| Development | YB Pengiran Dato Seri Laila Jasa Dr. Ismail bin Pengiran Haji Damit | Dato Paduka Awang Haji Selamat bin Haji Munap |
| Culture, Youth and Sports | YB Pehin Jawatan Luar Pekerma Raja Dato Seri Paduka Haji Awang Hussein bin Haji Mohammad Yusof | Dato Paduka Awang Haji Mohd.Ali bin Haji Mohd Daud |
| Health | YB Dato Paduka Dr.Haji Johar bin Dato Haji Noordin | |
