= First Hassanal Bolkiah Cabinet =

Cabinet of Brunei from 1984 to 1986

- 1st Cabinet of Brunei
- 1984–1986
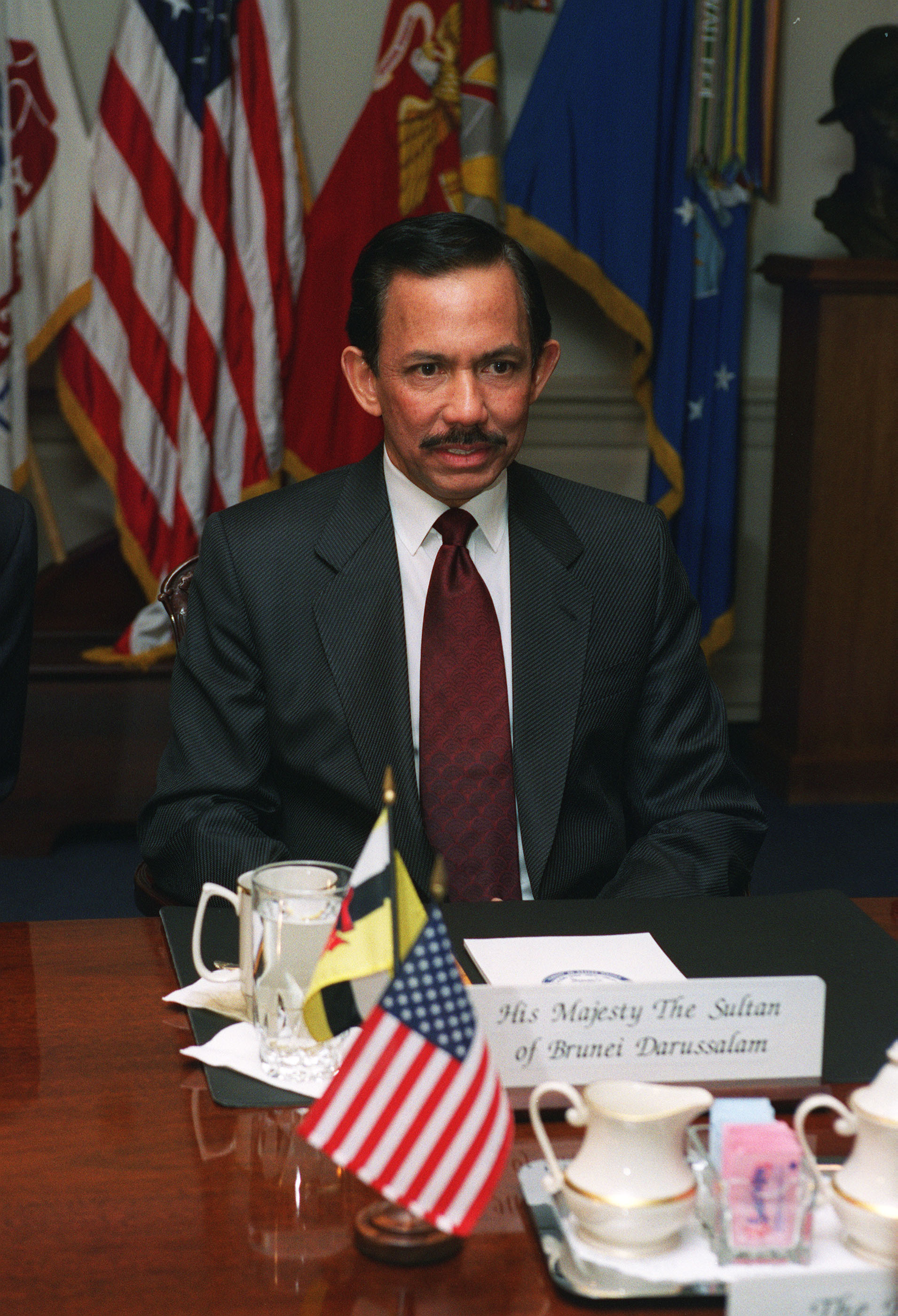
- Date formed: 1 January 1984
- Date dissolved: 20 October 1986

People and organisations
- Head of state: Hassanal Bolkiah
- Prime Minister: Hassanal Bolkiah

History
- Successor: Second Hassanal Bolkiah Cabinet

The First Hassanal Bolkiah Cabinet is the Cabinet of Brunei formed by Sultan Hassanal Bolkiah following the country's full independence on 1 January 1984 which governed until 20 October 1986.

== Composition ==
The first cabinet under Sultan Hassanal Bolkiah was announced immediately following Brunei's proclamation of independence on 1 January 1984. In line with the centralised and personalised nature of Brunei's system of governance, the Sultan assumed the offices of Prime Minister, Minister of Finance, and Minister of Home Affairs.

The cabinet was composed of seven additional members. Three positions were held by members of the royal family, covering the portfolios of defence, foreign affairs, and culture, youth and sports, with one also serving concurrently in a financial role. The remaining three positions were filled by senior state officials from outside the royal family, who were assigned to oversee the areas of law and communications, education and health, and development.

Composition of the Cabinet
| Portfolio | Minister | Portrait | Date |
|---|---|---|---|
| Prime Minister | Hassanal Bolkiah | | 1 January 1984 |
| Minister of Home Affairs | Hassanal Bolkiah | | 1 January 1984 |
| Minister of Finance | Hassanal Bolkiah | | 1 January 1984 |
| Minister of Defence | Omar Ali Saifuddien III | | 1 January 1984 |
| Minister of Culture, Youth and Sports | Prince Jefri Bolkiah | | 1 January 1984 |
| Deputy Minister of Finance | Prince Jefri Bolkiah | | 1 January 1984 |
| Minister of Foreign Affairs | Prince Mohamed Bolkiah | | 1 January 1984 |
| Minister of Communications | Pengiran Bahrin | | 1 January 1984 |
| Minister of Law | Pengiran Bahrin | | 1 January 1984 |
| Minister of Development | Abdul Rahman Taib | | 1 January 1984 |
| Minister of Education and Health | Abdul Aziz Umar | | 1 January 1984 |
