= Omar Ali Saifuddien III =

Sultan of Brunei Darassalam from 1950 to 1967

Omar Ali Saifuddien III عمر علي سيف الدين سعد الخير والدين
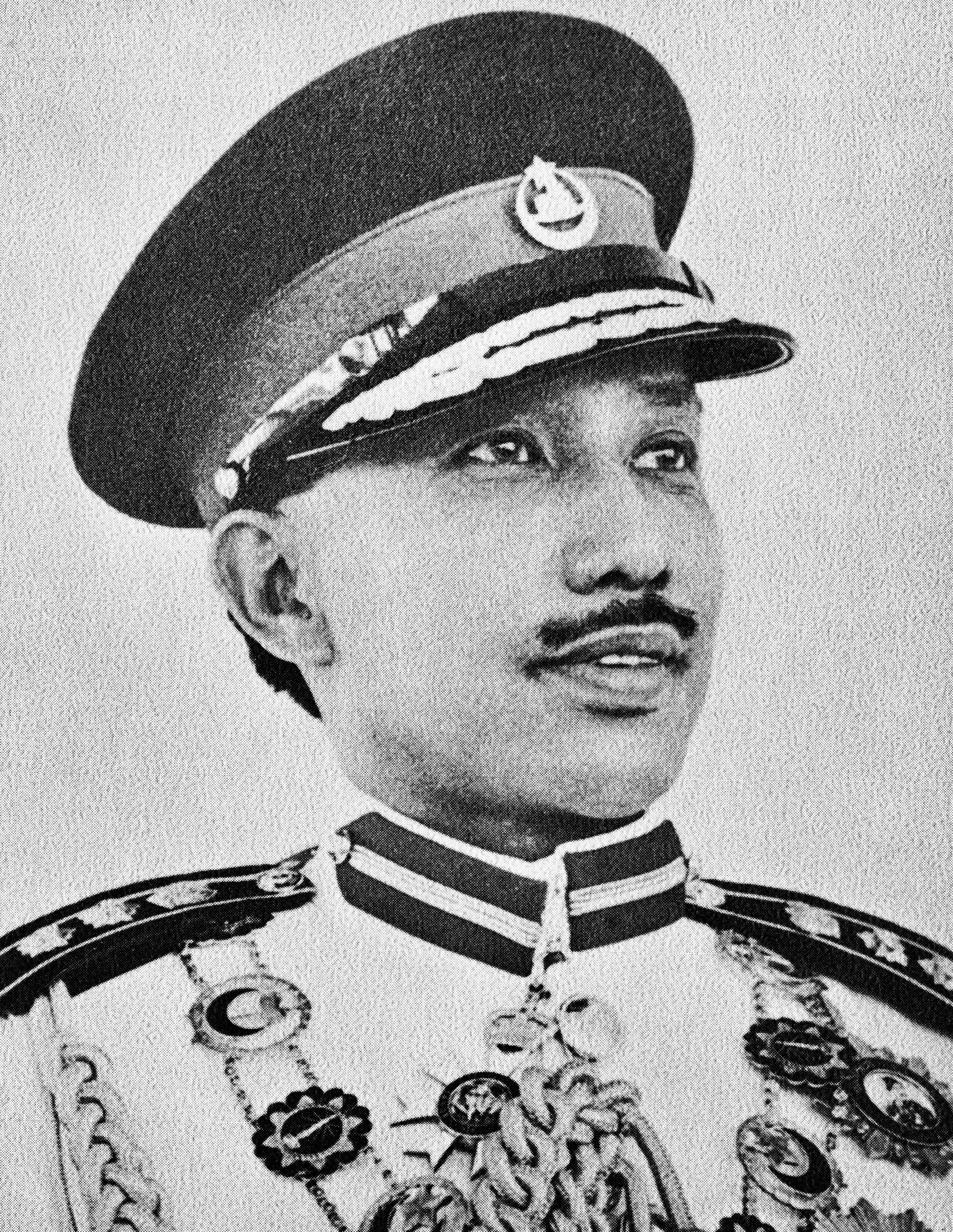
- Official portrait, c. 1967

Sultan of Brunei Darassalam
- Reign: 4 June 1950 – 5 October 1967
- Coronation: 31 May 1951
- Predecessor: Ahmad Tajuddin
- Successor: Hassanal Bolkiah

Minister of Defence Commander-in-Chief of the Royal Brunei Armed Forces
- In office 1 January 1984 – 7 September 1986
- Monarch: Hassanal Bolkiah
- Preceded by: office established
- Succeeded by: Hassanal Bolkiah
- Born: Omar Ali Saifuddien Sa'adul Khairi Waddien; 23 September 1914; Istana Kota, Brunei Town, Brunei Darassalam
- Died: 7 September 1986 (aged 71); Istana Darussalam, Bandar Seri Begawan, Brunei Darassalam
- Burial: 8 September 1986; Royal Mausoleum, Bandar Seri Begawan, Brunei Darassalam
- Spouse: Dayang Siti Amin (m. 1937; div. 1944) Pengiran Anak Damit (m. 1941; died 1979) Pengiran Anak Salhah (m. 1980)
- Issue: List: Hassanal Bolkiah; Prince Mohamed Bolkiah; Princess Masna; Princess Nor'ain; Prince Sufri Bolkiah; Prince Jefri Bolkiah; Princess Umi Kalthum Al-Islam; Princess Amal Rakiah; Princess Amal Nasibah; Princess Amal Jefriah
Regnal name
- Sultan Sir Haji Omar Ali Saifuddien Sa'adul Khairi Waddien ibni Almarhum Sultan Muhammad Jamalul Alam (Note: In this Malay name, there is no surname or family name. The name Muhammad Jamalul Alam is a patronymic, and the person should be referred to by their given name, Omar Ali Saifuddien Sa'adul Khairi Waddien. The word 'bin' / 'ibn' or 'binti' / 'binte' means 'son of' or 'daughter of', respectively.)
- House: Bolkiah
- Father: Muhammad Jamalul Alam II
- Mother: Raja Isteri Fatimah
- Religion: Islam

Omar Ali Saifuddien III Sa'adul Khairi Waddien (Note: Jawi: عمر علي سيف الدين سعد الخير والدين) (23 September 1914 – 7 September 1986) reigned as the Sultan of Brunei Darassalam from 1950 until his abdication in 1967.

== Early life and education ==
Omar Ali Saifuddien, born as Pengiran Muda Tengah, (Note: Pengiran Muda is a royal title, while Tengah indicates his middle position among the siblings. His later full name was Omar ’Ali Saifuddien Sa’adul Khairi Waddien.) was born at Istana Kota, a palace in Kampong Sultan Lama, Brunei Town (present-day Bandar Seri Begawan) on 23 September 1914. (Note: The Malayan College listed his birth date as 23 September 1916, reducing his age by two years; discovery of this error could have led to expulsion. The British Resident later recorded this date, which became the basis for official celebrations. However, based on historical records, including a 1967 birthday event stating he was 51, his actual birth date was 23 September 1914. Further confirmation comes from a 1986 Borneo Bulletin and Radio Brunei report stating he was 72, aligning with the 1914 birth year.) He was the seventh child out of ten of Sultan Muhammad Jamalul Alam II and Raja Isteri Fatimah. Following his birth, Pengiran Sharbanun binti Pengiran Muhammad raised him along with his older sister, Pengiran Anak Puteri Besar. Like the other royal children of Brunei Darassalam, he received an education centred on Islamic customs, etiquette, and good manners in the palace.

Omar Ali Saifuddien's behaviour and traits from a young age aligned with Islamic teachings. He began learning to read the Quran at the age of ten, under the guidance of tutors, and successfully completed his studies, performing forty formal Qira'at (recitations). (Note: Omar Ali learned to recite with Pengiran Anak Manggong, Pehin Khatib Abdul Razak, Pengiran Muda Hashim and Pengiran Pemancha Pengiran Anak Haji Muhammad Yasin.) It was customary for the princes and princesses of the royal family to study under various Quranic scholars to receive their blessings and favour. In his teenage years, Omar Ali Saifuddien continued his religious education, deepening his understanding of Islamic law. (Note: Before his departure, Dayang Chuchu binti Awang Haji Besar and Awang Haji Metali bin Mat Yasin taught him how to recite and the laws of Islam.) One of his mentors was Abdul Mokti Nasar. Regular instructors for him included Pengiran Abdul Rahim, a specialist in Islamic customs and ceremonies.

At the palace, he was instructed in the English language, religious knowledge, and customs. Pengiran Abdul Rahim, Shaykh Haji Abdul Halim, and T. F. Stalley were among his tutors. During this time, he studied Dikir Brunei (now called Dikir Saraful Anam), a form of traditional Bruneian vocal performance or chant, every day after supper until he became an expert in it. He had four years of formal education.

On the recommendation of Thomas Carey, the British Resident, the 18-year-old prince enrolled, together with two of his cousins, Pengiran Anak Mohamed Alam and Pengiran Anak Abdul Kahar, at the Malay College Kuala Kangsar in Perak, British Malaya, which he attended from 1932 to 1936. Haji Abdul Rahim accompanied him to the college. He was the first of the Bruneian sultans to receive formal education at a foreign institution.

== Early adulthood ==
In 1936, one week after arriving in Brunei Town from Malaya, Omar Ali Saifuddien was invited by Roland Evelyn Turnbull, the British Resident, to Kuala Belait to work as a cadet officer in the Forestry Department. After one week in Kuala Belait, he, along with Awang Abdul Hamid, Awang Maidin, and Awang Ludin, relocated to Bukit Puan, where they spent three months surveying the forest reserve. He familiarised himself with the forestry industry by working with Dusun, Belait, Tutong, and Iban labourers. Subsequently, he received invitations to work in locations including Bukit Sawat, Pengkalan Siong, Kuala Melayan, Sukang, Melilas, and Ingai.

In 1937, he was transferred to the Judiciary Department, where he became an administrative officer in 1938. He was instructed by Hughes Hallet, the Assistant British Resident in Kuala Belait, to examine the Criminal Procedure Code that was in effect in Brunei. During the Japanese occupation of Brunei from 1941 until 1945, he was employed by State Secretary Ibrahim Mohammad Jahfar at Somobucho. (Note: Somobucho (also spelled Sombucho) was the head of the General Affairs Department of the Japanese military government.) Under his supervision, he familiarised himself with the Criminal Procedure Code, which he had started to learn at Kuala Belait.

In 1947, after the end of the Japanese occupation, he was appointed a member of the State Council and chairman of the Syariah Court. He had the Wazir title Duli Yang Teramat Mulia Paduka Seri Pengiran Bendahara Seri Maharaja Permaisuara conferred on him by his brother, Sultan Ahmad Tajuddin, on 15 July 1947. Following his appointment as Wazir, he travelled often to Brunei's interior regions. Following each trip to the interior, he prepared reports that he sent to the Sultan. He also provided the British Resident with these reports to address the issues raised. Omar Ali Saifuddien said that the government always acted with his suggestions, especially when Eric Ernest Falk Pretty was serving as the British Resident.

One early contribution of Omar Ali Saifuddien was to regularise Islamic administration in Brunei Darassalam. A religious council, the Mohammedan Religious Advisers, was formed. The council met for the first time on 31 January 1948. He himself was appointed its chairman. After examining laws on Islamic affairs in the Malay Peninsula, the board made proposals regarding the religious administration in Brunei Darassalam.

== Reign ==
=== Accession and coronation ===
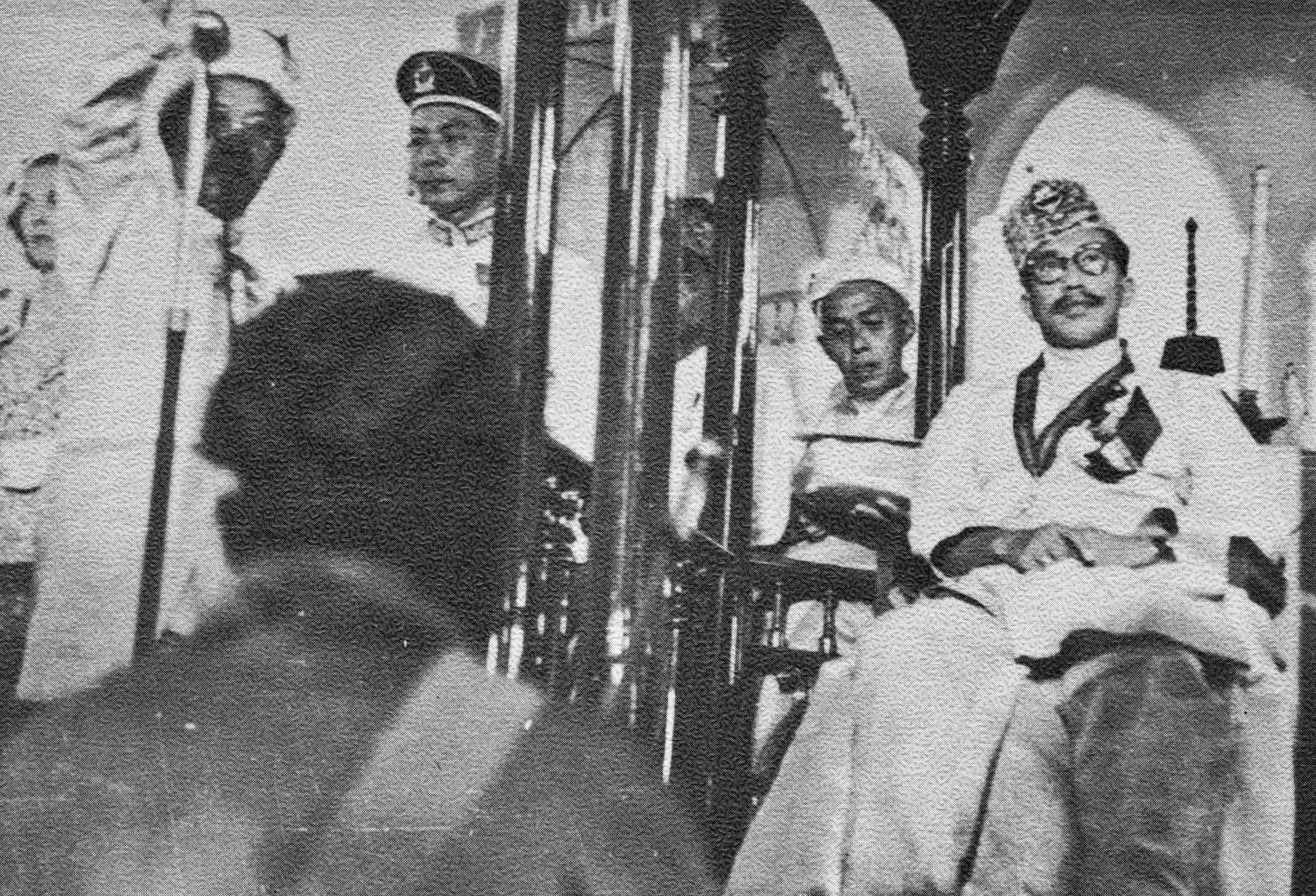

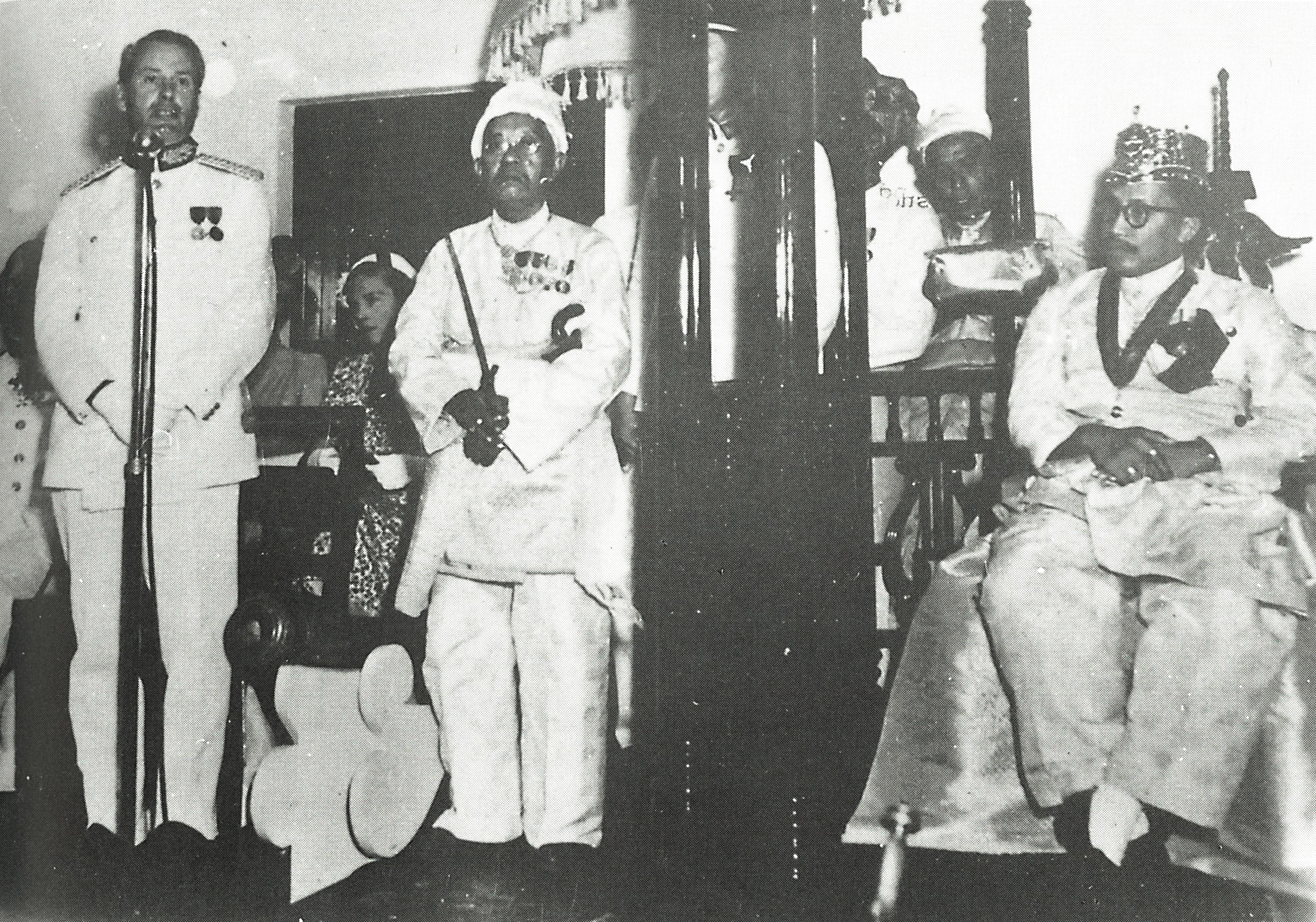
Omar Ali Saifuddien (right) seen at his coronation on 31 May 1951

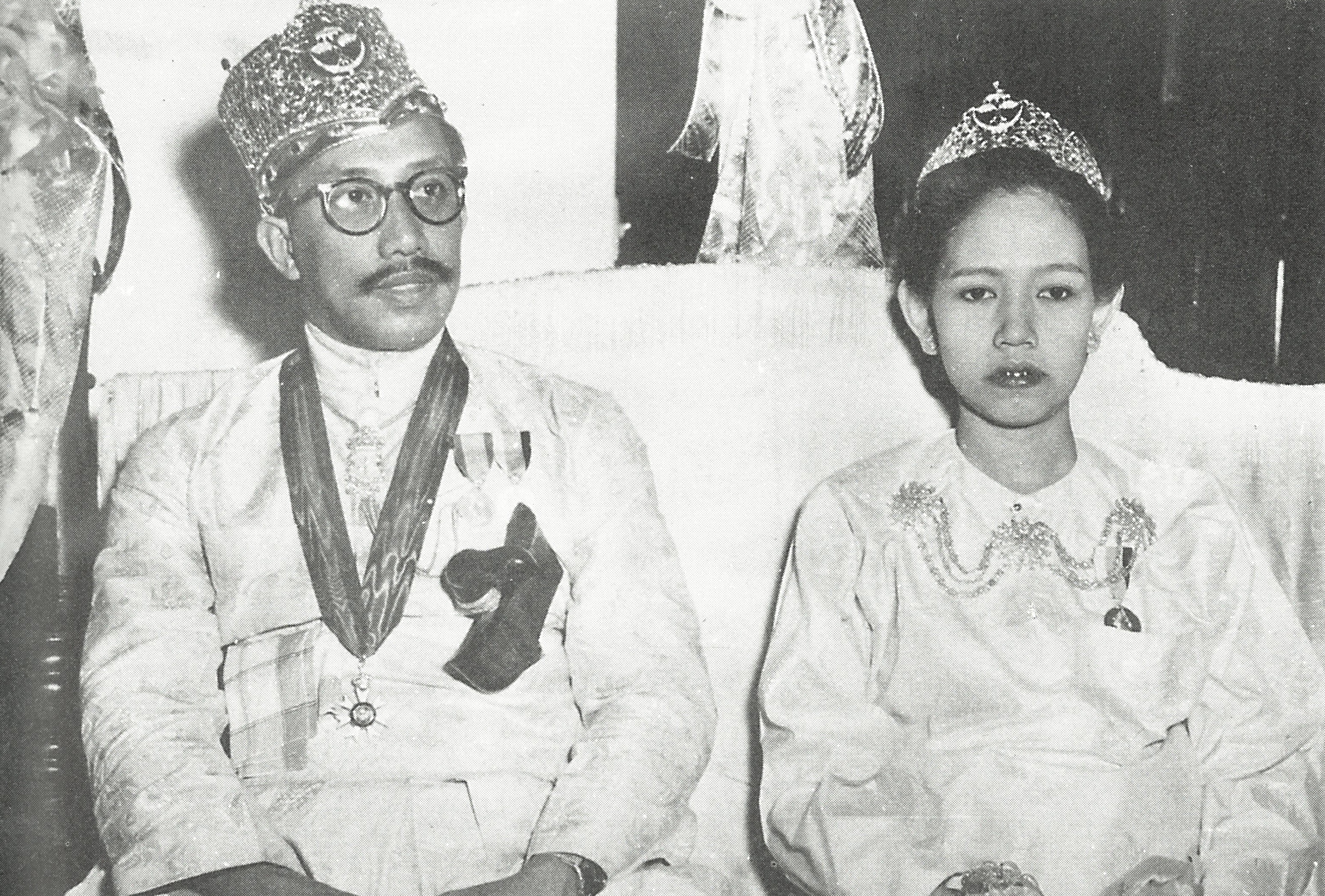
Omar Ali Saifuddien with his wife, Pengiran Anak Damit, at his coronation

Sultan Ahmad Tajuddin died suddenly in Singapore, leaving no male heirs, on 4 June 1950. Omar Ali Saifuddien was proclaimed by Pengiran Anak Muhammad Yasin as the next Sultan at the Government Office's hall on 6 June 1950. Omar Ali Saifuddien directed his late brother's burial at the Royal Mausoleum upriver, contrary to the preference of the late Sultan's widow, Tengku Raihani. Upon his ascension to the throne, Omar Ali Saifuddien also became the head of the Islamic religion in the country.

At 2:30 p.m., Eric Ernest Falk Pretty formally declared him as Sultan Omar Ali Saifuddien III and the 28th sultan of Brunei Darassalam, with the decision's origin remaining unclear between Sarawak's Governor Anthony Abell and Brunei's State Council. Pretty had installed Omar Ali Saifuddien as sultan "against significant local opposition". During a news conference held in Singapore early on 7 June 1950, Gerard MacBryan stated that the intended coronation of Omar Ali Saifuddin would not be possible without the elements of the Brunei Darassalam royal regalia Pretty had obtained.

Omar Ali Saifuddien was crowned as the Sultan dan Yang Di-Pertuan in the Lapau on 31 May 1951. In conjunction with the coronation, he was conferred with the Honorary Companion of the Most Distinguished Order of Saint Michael and Saint George by Queen Elizabeth II. He performed his Hajj pilgrimage in September of the same year.

=== Early reign and educational reforms ===
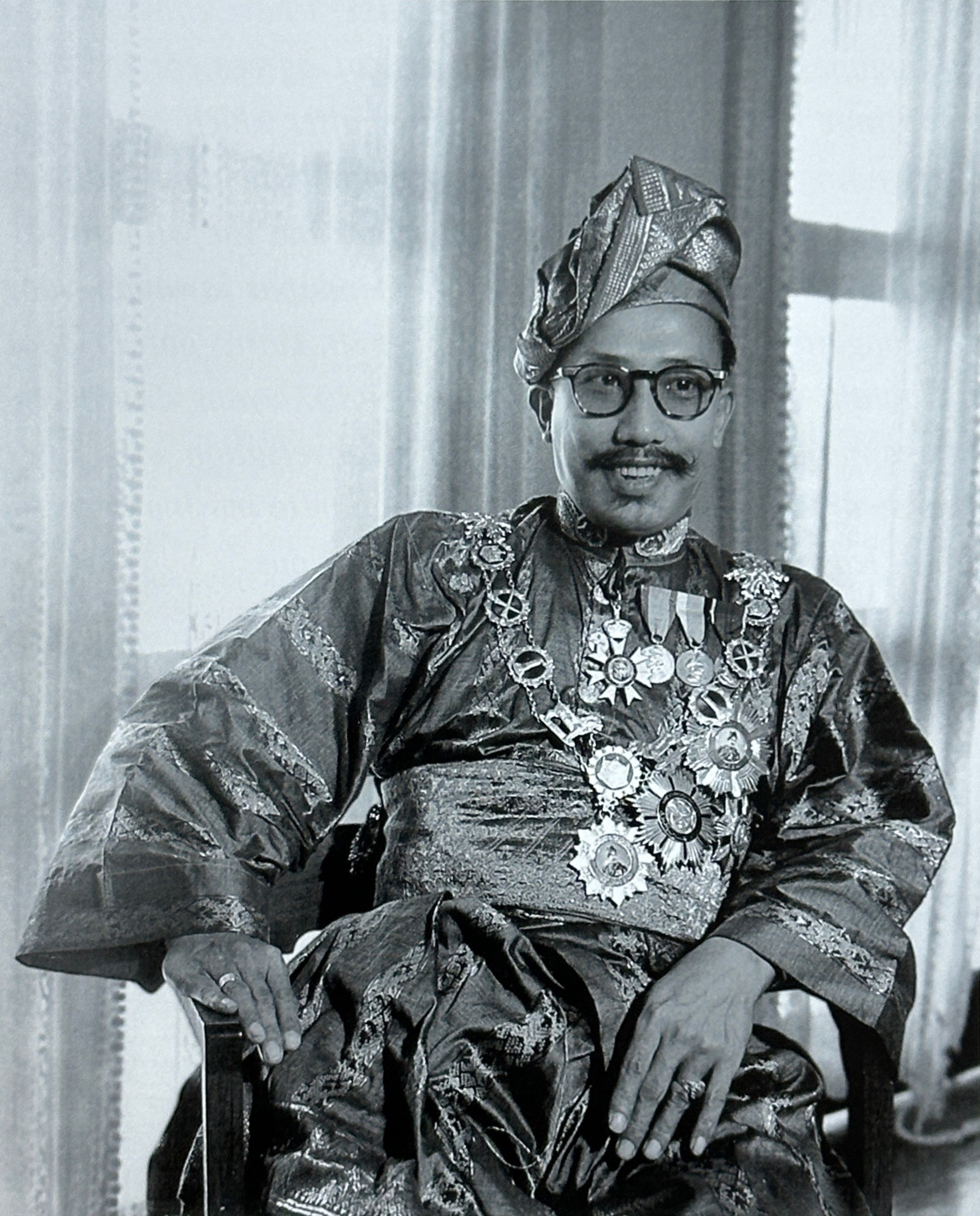
Omar Ali Saifuddien, c. 1950.

Omar Ali Saifuddien sent locals to study overseas as one of his initiatives. Three Malay fifth-graders were transferred to Singapore's Al-Juned Arabic School in 1950. This number went up every year. Omar Ali Saifuddien later attended the coronation of Queen Elizabeth II at Westminster Abbey in London, England, on 2 June 1953. He supported initiatives aimed at improving the people’s livelihood through national development programmes.

The Bruneian government spent B$10.65 million on educational issues. In 1954, this policy on education was first presented. The equipment of educational institutions, including secondary schools, adult education, and vocational training, was to be determined by this policy. The English-language Raja Isteri Girls' High School in Brunei Town was finished in 1957, but only went up to Form 3. The school's children went to Sultan Omar Ali Saifuddien College to sit for Forms 4 and 5 after completing the Lower Secondary Certificate Examination (set by the University of Cambridge). Sultan Muhammad Jamalul Alam Secondary School in Brunei Town, Muda Hashim Secondary School in Tutong, and Sultan Hassan Secondary School in Temburong were the secondary schools that were completed in 1966.

The Department of Religious Affairs was established on 1 July 1954, by the Sultan. The plan included aspects of Islam: including legal issues, educational issues, religious message–related activities, and social administration. Two religious officials from Johor, Ismail Omar Abdul Aziz and Othman Mohammad Said, were brought to Brunei on 25 September 1954. The Bruneian government started holding an evening religious school in September 1956. Additionally, the government began providing scholarships to a limited number of students to pursue further education overseas at Al-Azhar University in Cairo, Egypt; (Note: In 1963, one of the first Bruneian students to graduate from Al-Azhar University did so thanks to this scholarship. Three Bruneians graduated from Al-Azhar University under his reign.) Islamic College in Klang; and Madrasah Aljunied Al-Islamiah in Singapore.

On 11 October 1956, seven religious schools were established in Brunei Darassalam on the premises of both Malay and English schools, based on the religious officers' suggestions. Nine religious instructors who were invited from Johor were involved in the religious studies programme. The religious schools opened in the afternoon, after Zuhur. These religious schools were administered by the Department of Religious Affairs, and their director and administrator were the highest ranking officials in the department.

=== Constitutional journey of Brunei ===
Omar Ali Saifuddien formed a royal commission to get feedback from locals in various regions, which was the first step towards drafting a written constitution for Brunei Darassalam. The commission had seven appointed members, and was called the Tujuh Serangkai. It was tasked with gathering public feedback, creating a report, and offering Omar Ali Saifuddien advice on creating district councils, reorganising the State Council, and creating the Constitution. The Tujuh Serangkai created a report detailing the public's support for Omar Ali Saifuddien's constitutional goals after touring all districts of Brunei. Under his direction, Brunei Darassalam's constitution was drafted, and on 23 March 1954, the Tujuh Serangkai presented a 50-page report to him.

The first draft of Brunei Darassalam's constitution, prepared by Abell and his colleagues, aligned with the objectives of the constitutional committee. Abell, the Sultan, and his two wazirs, Pengiran Muda Hashim and Pengiran Anak Mohamed Alam, met with British Resident John Orman Gilbert from 16 to 17 December 1954 at Istana Darul Hana. These negotiations led to minor amendments, which were submitted to the Colonial Office and unanimously accepted. District Advisory Councils were subsequently established in each of the four districts in 1955. By mid-1955, Omar Ali Saifuddien's insistence on securing positions for his wazirs in the Legislative Council and Executive Council complicated the constitutional drafting process, and disrupted British plans for parliamentary reorganisation.

In 1956, the Brunei People's Party (PRB), led by A. M. Azahari, gained popularity for supporting Omar Ali Saifuddien's role as a constitutional monarch while advocating independence through constitutional means. Although the Colonial authorities endorsed some of the PRB's goals, they deemed its demands for equal pay, worker welfare, ministerial governance, and public elections too extreme. Omar Ali Saifuddien's firm resistance to British proposals to limit his powers and turn him into a constitutional monarch strengthened his resolve to maintain local control, leading to major revisions and deletions in the draft constitution.

In 1957, Omar Ali Saifuddien sent a team to London to negotiate the constitution with the British Conservative government. The principal focus of the negotiations was the Rang Undang-Undang Perlembagaan Negeri Brunei (Brunei State Constitution Bill), drafted by Panglima Bukit Gantang in Brunei House, Singapore. Although Azahari attempted to communicate with British officials, Omar Ali Saifuddien's opposition meant that the PRB's recommendations were not considered.

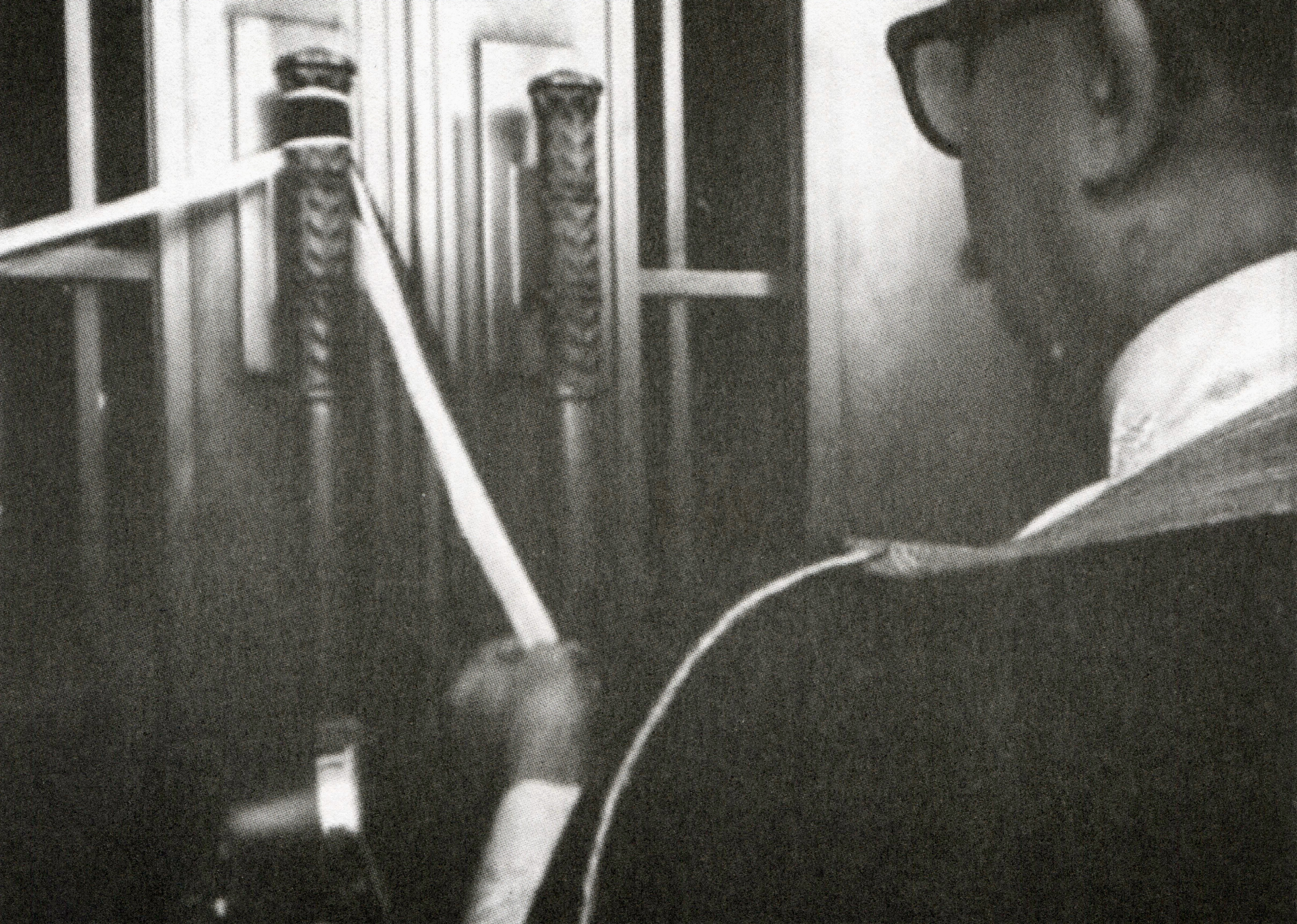
Omar Ali Saifuddien cutting a ribbon during the official opening ceremony of Omar Ali Saifuddien Mosque in 1958.

In 1958, the 1957 London discussions were revisited in Brunei Darassalam. Omar Ali Saifuddien and Abell met on 27 October at Istana Darul Hana to review the outcomes, and finalise the key concepts from the earlier talks. On 2 November, a special meeting chaired by his adviser resolved to send a delegation led by Omar Ali Saifuddien to London for further constitutional negotiations. Panglima Bukit Gantang and Neil Lawson were selected to accompany him.

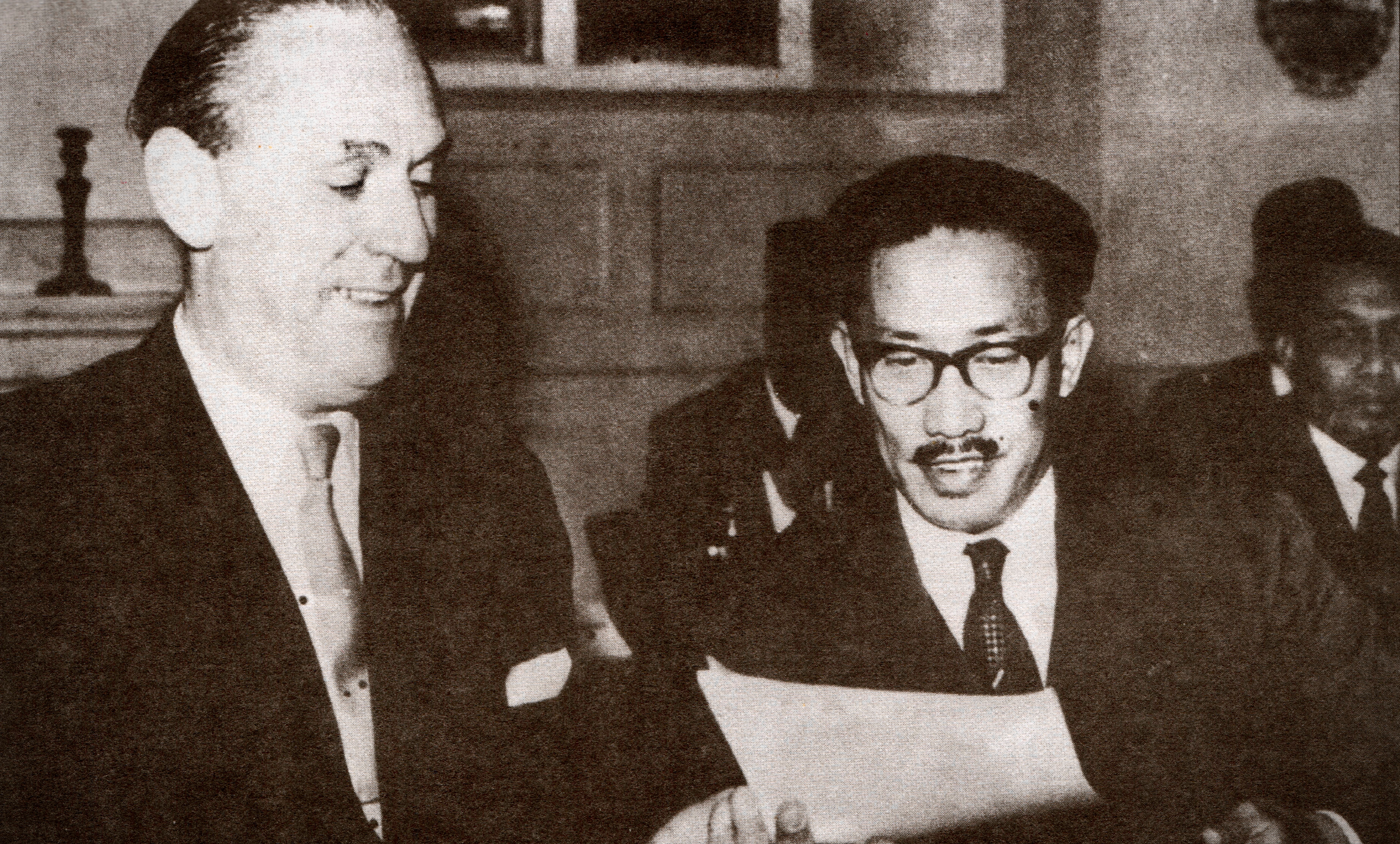
Lennox-Boyd and Omar Ali Saifuddien at the signing of the Brunei Agreement in London, 1959.

Following the Merdeka Talks, Brunei Darassalam's constitutional issues drew the attention of British authorities, who summoned Omar Ali Saifuddien to London in early 1959 to finalise the document with the Colonial Secretary, Alan Lennox-Boyd. On 14 March, he travelled via Singapore with ten members of his team for the constitutional talks. As a result of these discussions, the Brunei Agreement was concluded on 6 April 1959. The agreement fulfilled the main requests of the Tujuh Serangkai, including the appointment of the Menteri Besar (Chief Minister), and the adoption of staggered implementation measures starting on 1 July.

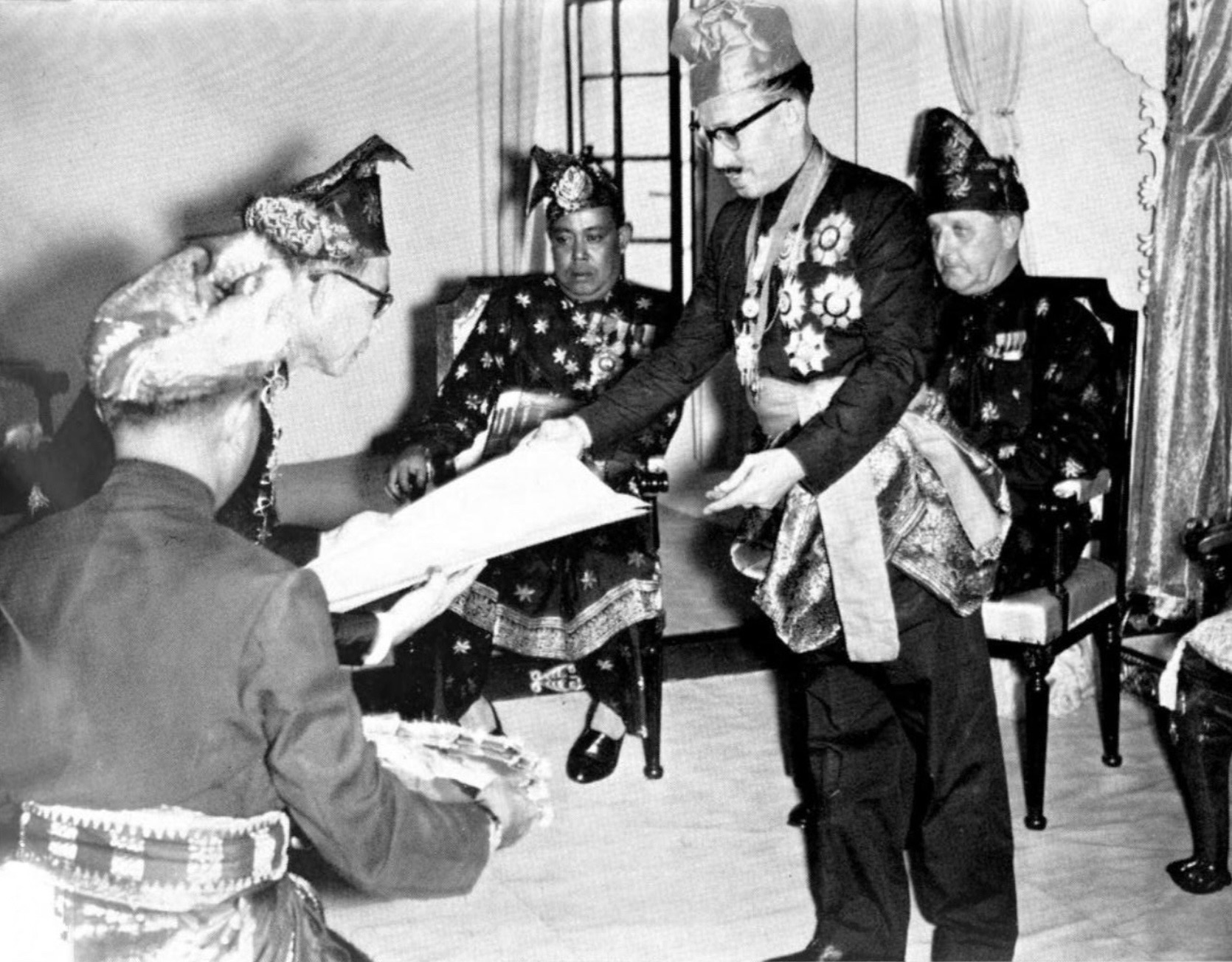
At the Lapau in 1959, Omar Ali Saifuddien giving the country's first Menteri Besar his instrument of office.

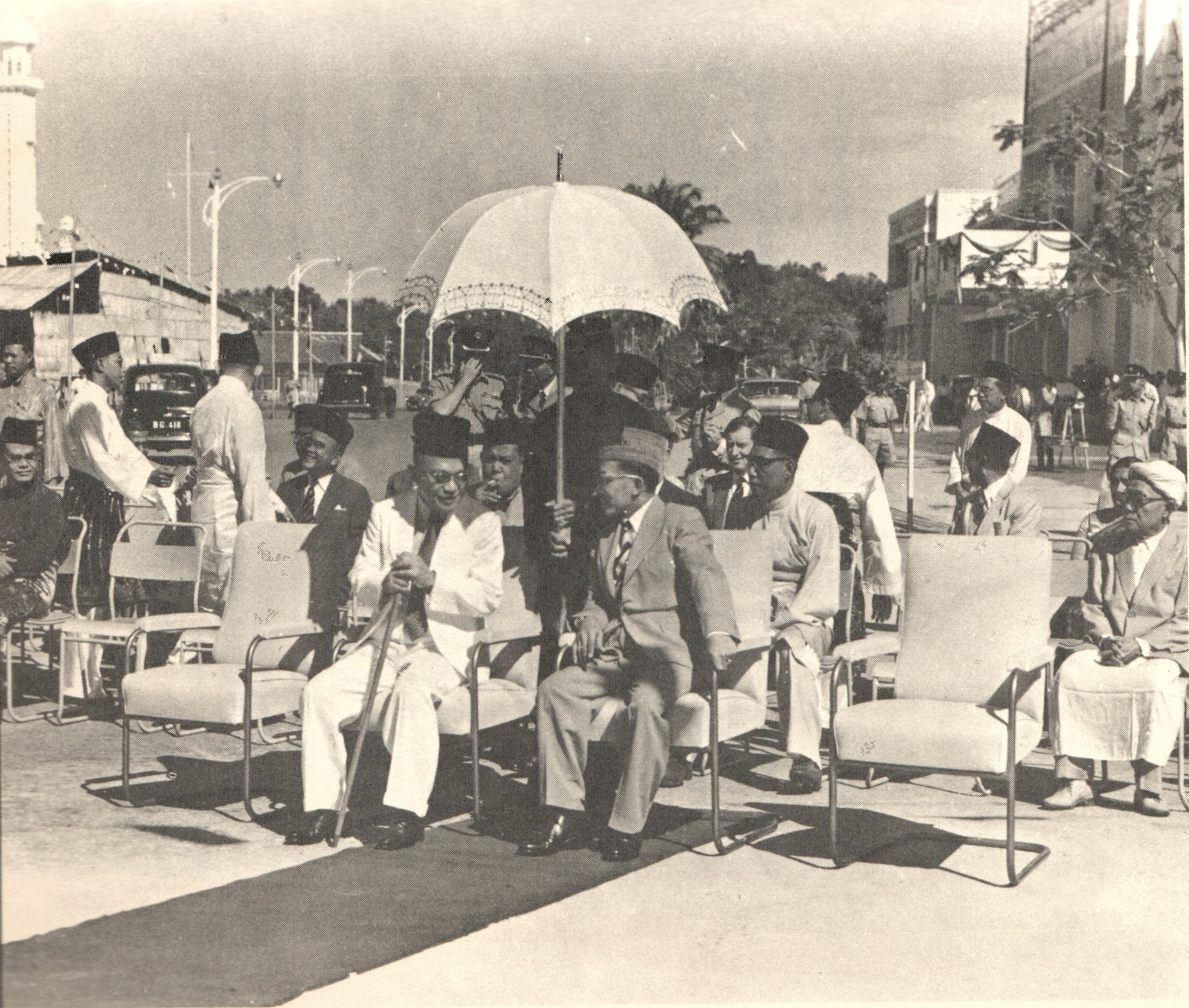
Tuanku Abdul Rahman (left) and Omar Ali Saifuddien (right) in 1959.

Under the constitution, Omar Ali Saifuddien oversaw the appointment of five key administrators: the Menteri Besar, the State Secretary, the General, the State Finance Officer, and the Religious Advisor. On 29 September 1959, the constitution was signed in Brunei Town by Omar Ali Saifuddien and Robert Scott, with the British delegation led by Lennox-Boyd. The British government subsequently accepted the draft constitution. The document established Omar Ali Saifuddien as the supreme head of state, assigned Brunei responsibility for its internal administration, and restricted the British Government to foreign and defence affairs. The former post of British Resident was abolished, and replaced by a British High Commissioner. Additionally, five councils were established: the Executive Council, Legislative Council, Privy Council, Council of Succession, and the State Religious Council.

=== 1962 district council election ===
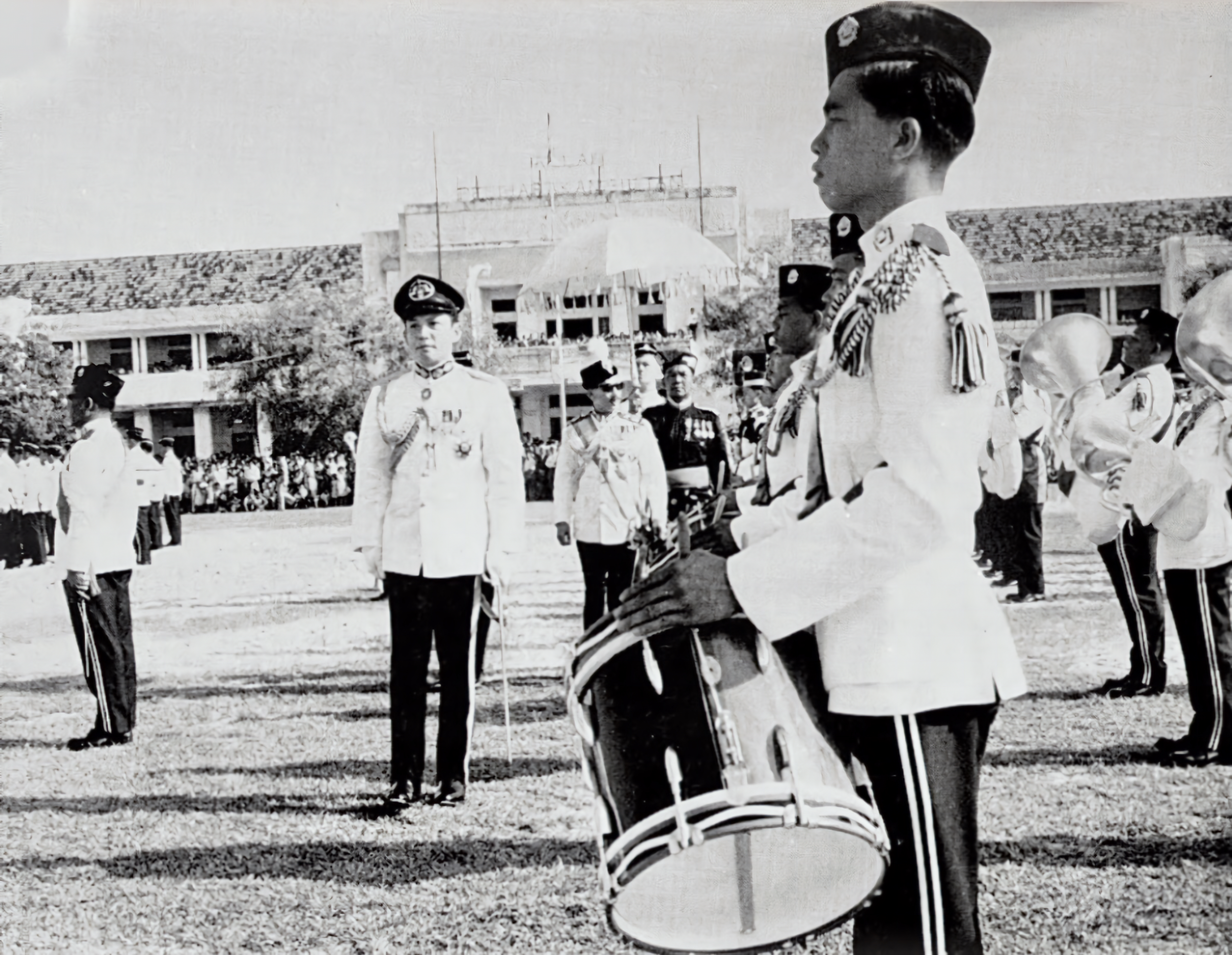
Omar Ali Saifuddien inspecting the newly formed Royal Brunei Malay Regiment Band in 1962.

Brunei Darassalam's first state election was held on 30 and 31 August 1962. This was to elect members to sit in the Legislative Council. These elected members would then be involved in discussions of governmental policies. Despite this, Omar Ali Saifuddien still held absolute power and authority in the government. Among the political parties which contested in the election were: PRB, Barisan Nasional Organisation, and Brunei United Party. The polling continued for two days, which ended with the PRB winning the election.

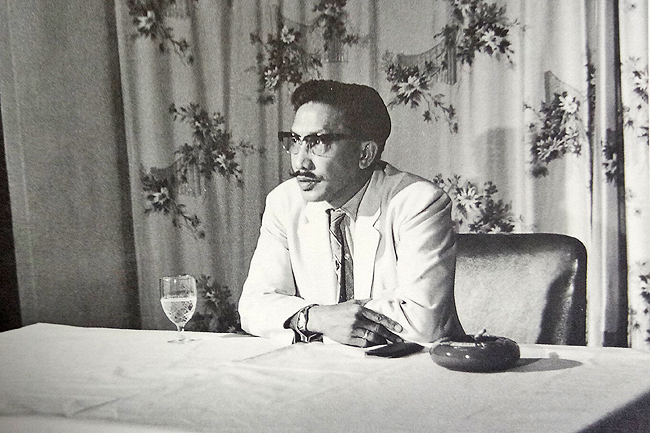
Omar Ali Saifuddien delivering a titah through Radio Brunei in 1962, from Istana Darul Hana.

=== Proposed merger with Malaysia and revolt ===
When Tunku Abdul Rahman, the prime minister of the Federation of Malaya announced his proposal for a merger of Singapore, North Borneo, Sarawak, and Brunei Darassalam in May 1961, Omar Ali Saifuddien saw this as an opportunity for Brunei Darassalam to achieve independence from British influence. He sent a congratulatory telegraph to Tunku Abdul Rahman, showing his support for the merger. In his opinion, Brunei, as a small country, needed a protection of a larger country; the only way to achieve this was by merging with Malaysia and the rest of the Malay states. This view was also shared by Lee Kuan Yew, the prime minister of Singapore. When the Malaysian Solidarity Consultative Committee (MSCC) first convened in Jesselton in August 1961, Brunei abstained from the proceedings.

The PRB, and its leader Azahari, who had considerable popular support, were against the merger. According to them, if Brunei Darassalam was to join the Federation, Brunei would not have achieved full independence if it transferred power from Britain to Malaya. On 8 December 1962, the PRB led a rebellion against the government. British military aid was deployed from Singapore. The 2nd Gurkha Rifles was sent to Brunei Darassalam in 1962, the year the Brunei Revolt started. Omar Ali Saifuddien and his son, Hassanal Bolkiah, were saved from his palace by Digby Willoughby and a small group of Gurkha soldiers.

After the rebellion was defeated, the discussion of joining the proposed North Borneo Federation continued. Omar Ali Saifuddien sent a delegation to attend meetings of the Malaysian Solidarity Consultative Committee (MSCC). The committee, chaired by Chief Minister Marsal Maun, sought the views of the people. Omar Ali Saifuddien decided in 1963 to open religious classes for adults. This practice, initiated by an emergency meeting of the Religious Affairs Committee on 7 January 1963, aimed to foster and protect loyalty to the Sultan.

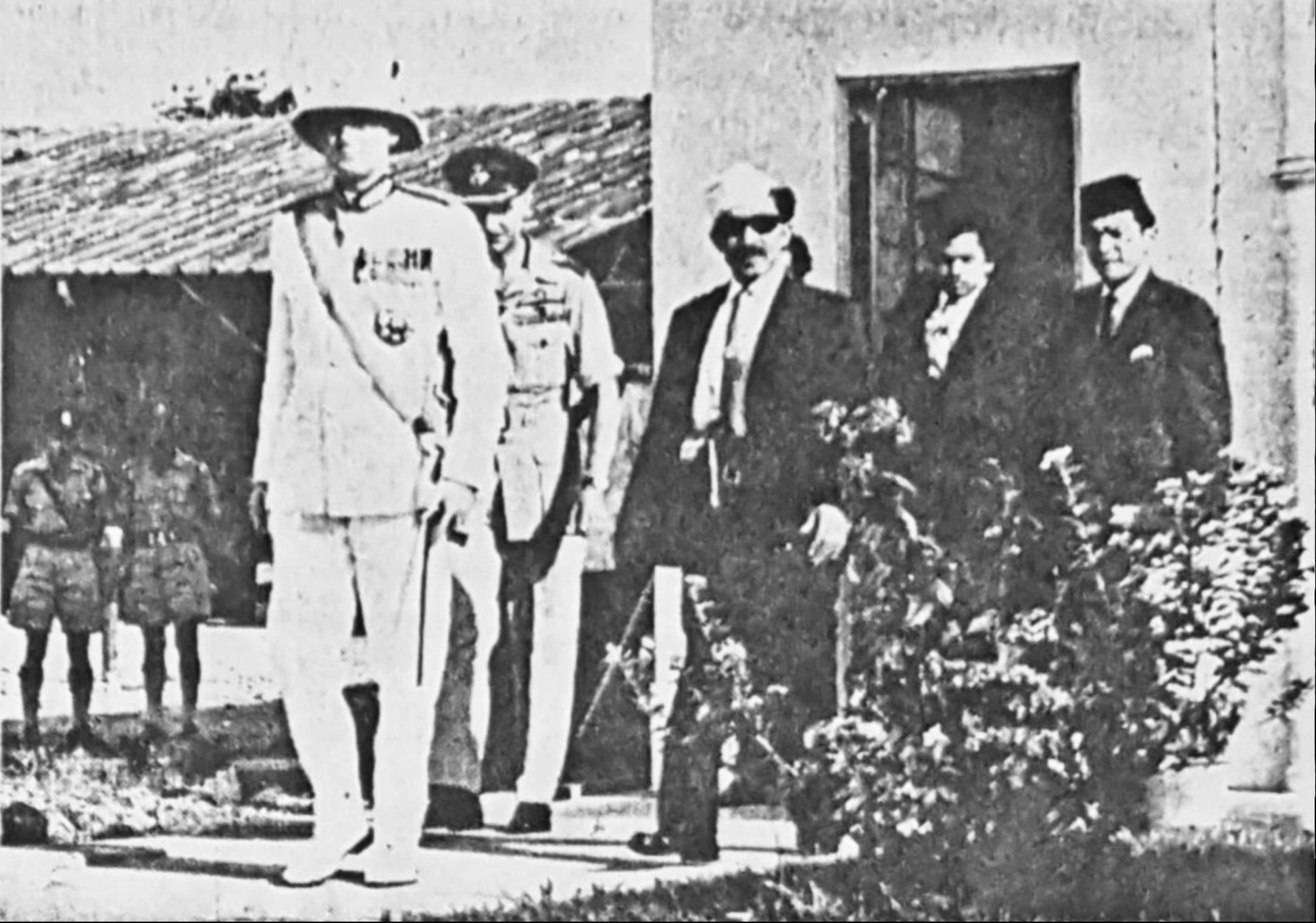
Angus Mackintosh and Omar Ali Saifuddien leaving the Brunei Airport Building in late 1963.

In 1963, a meeting was held to discuss the prospect of Brunei joining Malaysia. Arguments arose about taxes. Omar Ali Saifuddien was offended by Tunku Abdul Rahman's proposals and held off making a decision. Singapore and Brunei were not present when the Malaysia Agreement was signed in London in July 1963. The Federation of Malaysia was established in September 1963, but Brunei Darassalam chose not to join the federation.

=== Later reign ===
On 24 September 1964, Omar Ali Saifuddien laid the foundation stone for the nation's first school teaching Arabic, Hassanal Bolkiah Boys' Arabic Secondary School, and outlined his vision for religious secondary schools. On 28 October 1964, he also launched the first delivery of a 10 in (250 mm) oil pipeline from the seabed off the coast of the Seria oil field.

One of the results of Omar Ali Saifuddien's religious education programme was that students who completed seven years of schooling, were trained to become local religious instructors. These 'trained religious teachers' had to pass a specific exam and attend weekly sessions in order to become 'Untrained Teachers'. On 22 May 1966, evening religious training sessions were instituted five days a week for a year in order to improve their abilities and enable them become completely qualified 'Trained Religious Teachers'.

== Abdication and post-reign ==
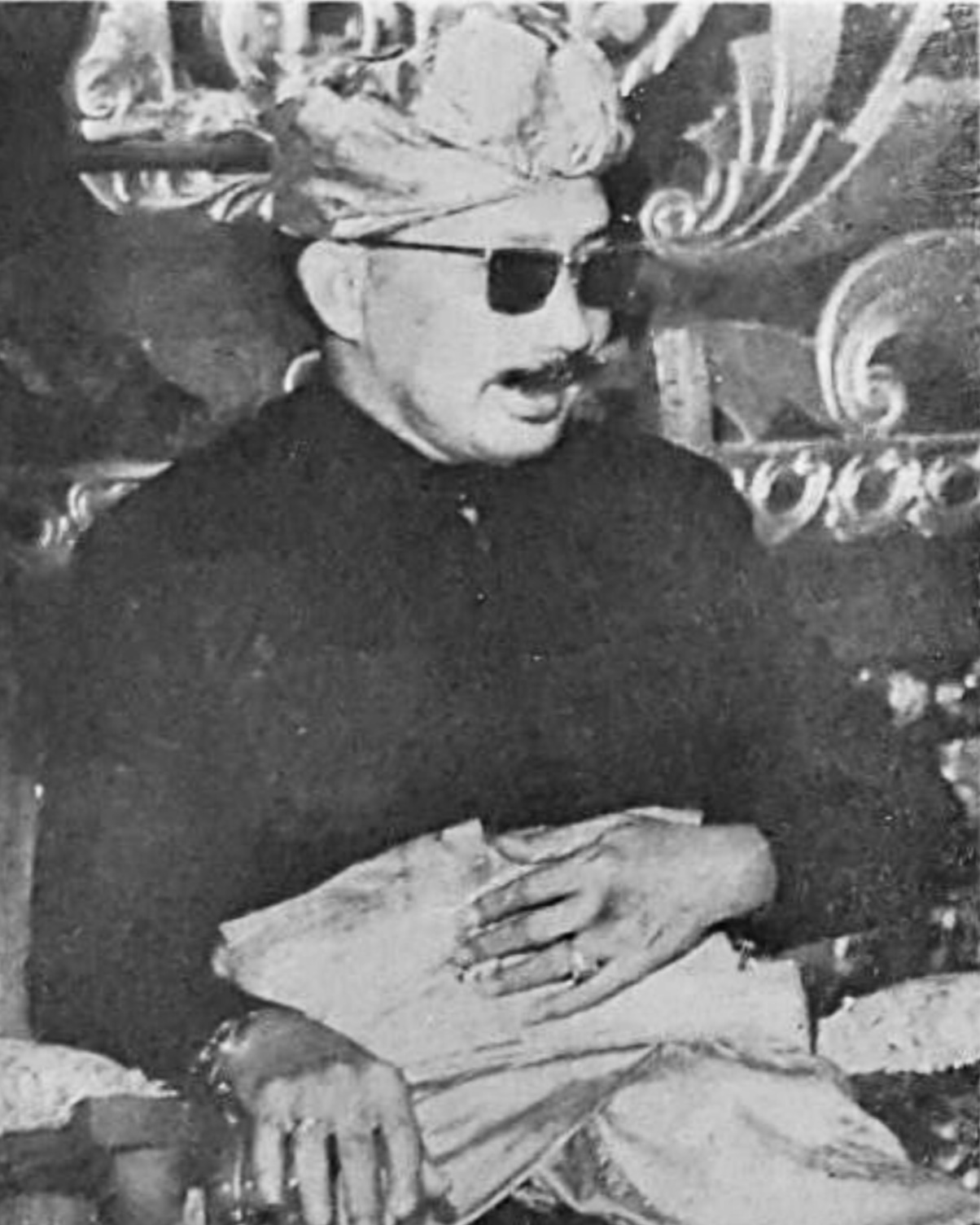
Omar Ali Saifuddien at his son Hassanal Bolkiah's coronation in 1967.

On 4 October 1967, after a reign of 17 years and a protracted illness, Omar Ali Saifuddien announced his abdication in favour of his 21-year-old eldest son, Crown Prince Hassanal Bolkiah, who had gained some understanding of the affairs of the country's administration. The announcement was made during an assembly of the noble classes of Wazir, Cheteria, and Manteri, held in the Balai Pemanjangan Indera Kenchana, a chamber of the Istana Darul Hana.

Whereas I am happy to tell from the feelings of my word in declaring to the Government and all the citizens and residents of Brunei is that I will abdicate the Throne on 4 October 1967 is fixed and final and irrevocable.

— Sultan Omar Ali Saifuddien III, on 4 October 1967

The news was made public on Radio Brunei that evening by Pengiran Anak Mohamed Alam. His abdication came as a surprise to many in the country, and became known as the Peristewa 4hb. Oktober (4 October Event). Omar Ali Saifuddien was accorded the post-regnal title of Duli Yang Teramat Mulia Paduka Seri Begawan Sultan (His Highness the Retired Sultan). His spouse, Pengiran Anak Damit, became Duli Yang Teramat Mulia Paduka Suri Seri Begawan (Her Royal Highness Princess Seri Begawan).

The Crown Prince went back to Brunei Darassalam before completing his education at Royal Military Academy Sandhurst in the United Kingdom to take over his father's position. Following the declaration of abdication, Pengiran Muhammad Yusuf, the Acting Prime Minister of Brunei (Menteri Besar), issued the following announcement on 5 October:

The President of the Council of Succession announced that on 4th October 1967, His Majesty Al-Sultan Sir Omar 'Ali Saifuddien has in accordance with Section 19 of the Succession and Regency Proclamation 1959, proclaimed his intention which cannot be withdrawn of abdicating from the throne of the Government. The Council of Succession, at its meeting on 4 October 1967 has confirmed the accession of His Royal Highness Prince Hassanal Bolkiah, The Crown Prince, D.K., as the Sultan of Brunei in accordance with the laws as the lawful to His Majesty Maulana Al-Sultan Sir Omar Ali Saifuddien.

— Pengiran Muhammad Yusuf, on 5 October 1967

Sultan Hassanal Bolkiah Muiz'zaddin Wad'daulah was formally proclaimed the 29th Sultan of Brunei in a ceremony on the day after his father's abdication. During the event, state dignitaries like the Wazirs, Cheteria, Acting Menteri Besar, and members of the Legislative Council were present.

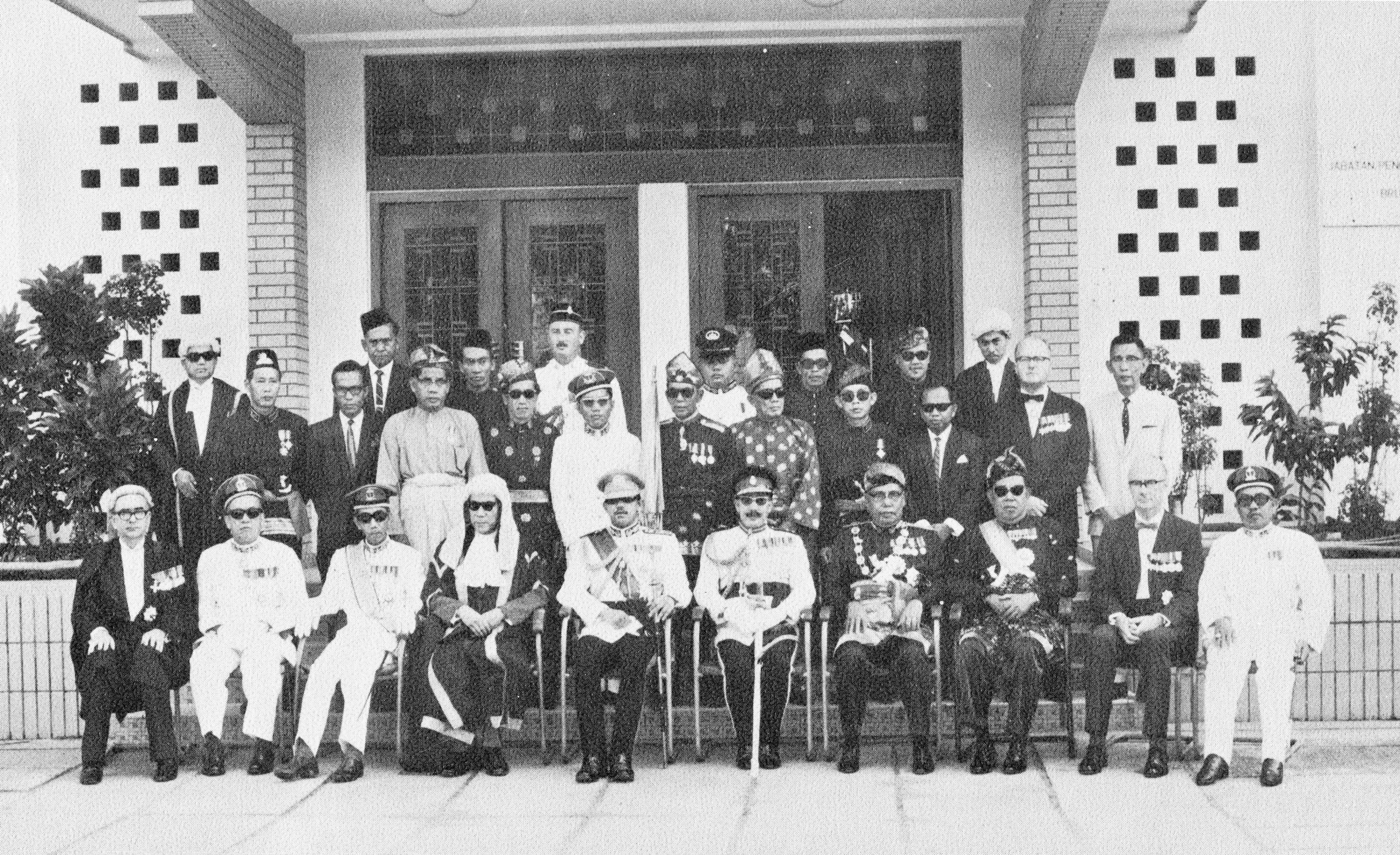
Hassanal Bolkiah and Omar Ali Saifuddien (seated, middle) at the opening of the 1967 Legislative Council.

After his abdication, Omar Ali Saifuddien continued counselling and mentoring his oldest son in the roles of both a statesman and a father. On 23 November 1971, Omar Ali Saifuddien was present at the signing of the Brunei–British Friendship Agreement, a modification of the Brunei Agreement, in Bandar Seri Begawan. He was conferred with the Honorary Grand Commander of the Victorian Order (GCVO) by Queen Elizabeth II during her visit to Brunei Darassalam on 29 February 1972. In 1978, Omar Ali Saifuddien accompanied Hassanal Bolkiah to London as part of the delegation to discuss Brunei's independence with the British government. He remained closely involved in the transition, and was present at Brunei's proclamation of independence in 1984, following the signing of the Treaty of Friendship and Cooperation on 1 January, which ended Britain's responsibility for Brunei's military and foreign policy.

Omar Ali Saifuddien was appointed by Hassanal Bolkiah as Minister of Defence in Brunei's first cabinet, and consequently conferred the rank of Field Marshal in the Royal Brunei Armed Forces (RBAF). He also welcomed the arrival of Yasser Arafat, the Chairman of Palestine Liberation Organisation, on his official visit to Brunei Darassalam on 26 July 1984. Additionally, he granted audience from Commander Thomas Anthony Boam of the United Kingdom and Commander L. B. Moerdani of Indonesia in 1985.

== Death ==
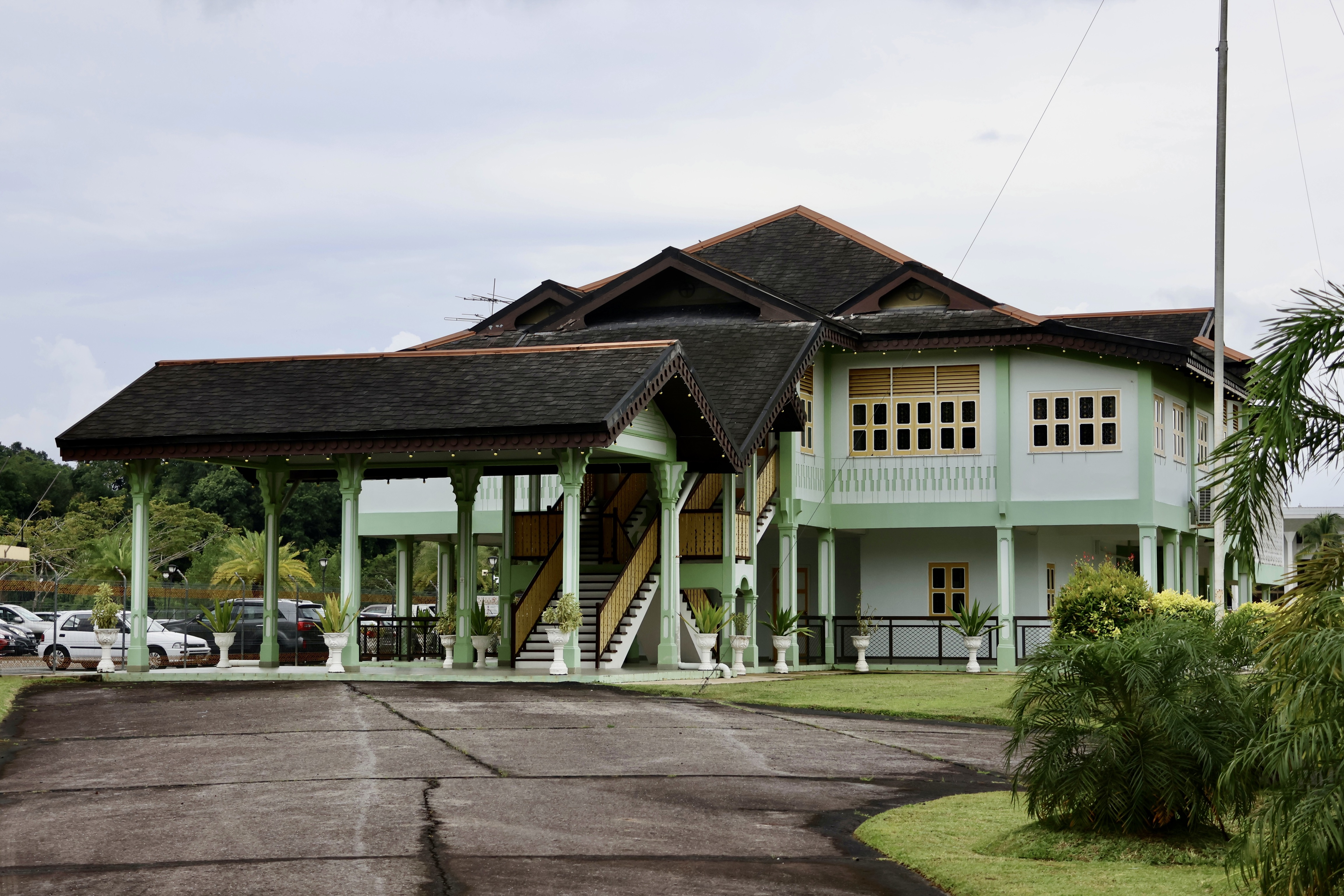
Istana Darussalam in 2022.

On 7 September 1986 at 8:45 p.m., Omar Ali Saifuddien died at his residence of Istana Darussalam at the age of 71. It had been reported that he was sick for weeks prior to his death. This began 40 days of national mourning. The news of his death was released at 12:25 a.m. on 8 September 1986. The announcement reached Bruneians through the disruption of regularly scheduled television and radio shows, including readings from the Quran. On the same day was the state funeral, where his body was in Istana Nurul Iman's Green Room for eight hours.

Hassanal Bolkiah and his brothers brought their father's coffin, which was covered in green velvet with Quranic inscriptions, to its grave. Prayers and tributes were presented throughout the day by hundreds of Bruneians and international dignitaries, including Singapore's President Wee Kim Wee and Brig-Gen Lee Hsien Loong. While religious leaders prayed non-stop, four guards from the Royal Brunei Police and Armed Forces stood guard over his coffin. The casket was placed beneath crystal chandeliers on a pedestal wrapped with golden drapes and adorned with Quranic calligraphy.

The casket was carried out of the palace, with Wee, Lee, Sultan Ahmad Shah of Pahang, Malaysian Prime Minister Mahathir Mohamad, and Hassanal Bolkiah positioned behind it. The casket was transported in a hand-drawn carriage to the tomb, where a gun salute was fired, while hundreds of people lined the streets in the rain, and the 2 kilometres (1.2 mi) funeral procession from Bandar Seri Begawan to the Royal Mausoleum was accompanied by members of the Royal Brunei Armed Forces (RBAF) and bearers of royal regalia. The pallbearers were Prince Mohamed Bolkiah and Prince Jefri Bolkiah.

At the mausoleum, Hassanal Bolkiah and his brothers placed their father's body in the grave. The State Kadi, Abdul Hamid Bakal, led the funeral rites, with Quranic verses recited. Wee, the Sultan of Pahang, and the Tunku Ibrahim Ismail joined mourners, and Lee sat behind them. After a 90-minute service, Hassanal Bolkiah led the sprinkling of holy water on the grave. A prayer service was held that night at the palace, with nightly prayers continuing for the mourning period. Foreign dignitaries and statesmen who travelled to Brunei Darassalam to attend the funeral included Iskandar of Johor, Tunku Puan Zanariah, Ahmad Shah of Pahang, Tengku Ampuan Afzan, Tunku Ibrahim Ismail, Wee Kim Wee, Lee Hsien Loong, Mahathir Mohamad, Siti Hasmah, and Moerdani.

British Prime Minister Margaret Thatcher said that Omar Ali Saifuddien holds a "unique position in the history of Brunei and in the hearts of all who knew him in Britain". Presidents Suharto of Indonesia, Zia-ul-Haq of Pakistan, and Corazon Aquino of the Philippines all described it as an irreparable loss for Brunei. President of Bangladesh, Hussain Muhammad Ershad expressed his deep appreciation for him for his vision, foresight, and wise leadership.

Several other heads of state and governments sent condolences, including Sir Geoffrey Howe, Ja'afar of Negeri Sembilan, Ismail Nasiruddin of Terengganu, Putra of Perlis, Ismail Petra of Kelantan, Abdul Halim of Kedah, Salahuddin of Selangor, Sharafuddin of Selangor, Azlan Shah of Perak, Muhammad Khan Junejo, Qaboos bin Said, Ahmad Zaidi Adruce, Hussain Muhammad Ershad, Hussein of Jordan, Isa bin Salman Al Khalifa, Khalifa bin Hamad Al Thani, Hosni Mubarak, Ronald Reagan, Fahd of Saudi Arabia, Jaber Al-Ahmad Al-Sabah, Birendra of Nepal, Hafez al-Assad, Saad Al-Salim Al-Sabah, Agatha Barbara, Khalifa bin Salman Al Khalifa, Hirohito, Bhumibol Adulyadej, Zaid Rifai, Zayed bin Sultan Al Nahyan, Richard von Weizsäcker, Helmut Kohl, and Chun Doo-hwan.

In a speech delivered on 20 October 1986, live on Radio Television Brunei (RTB) from Istana Nurul Iman, on the occasion of the Council of Cabinet Ministers of Brunei's reorganisation, Sultan Hassanal Bolkiah mourned the death of his father. He was quoted stating:

Although the period of official mourning of 40 days has ended, nevertheless, as a son of his beloved father, I still suffer the feeling of sadness and grief, and I shall always suffer them, that is to say, there is no time limit. This is because the passing away of Al-Marhum represents a very great loss, which is irreplaceable and has brought the greatest sadness to me and my family.
The more so as Al-Marhum was not only just a father who poured out his love and affection, full of tenderness, towards his children, Al-Marhum was also a mentor who was constantly and without stopping giving guidance, showing the way and giving words of advice to me until the very end of his life.

— Sultan Hassanal Bolkiah, 20 October 1986

== Personal life ==
=== Family ===
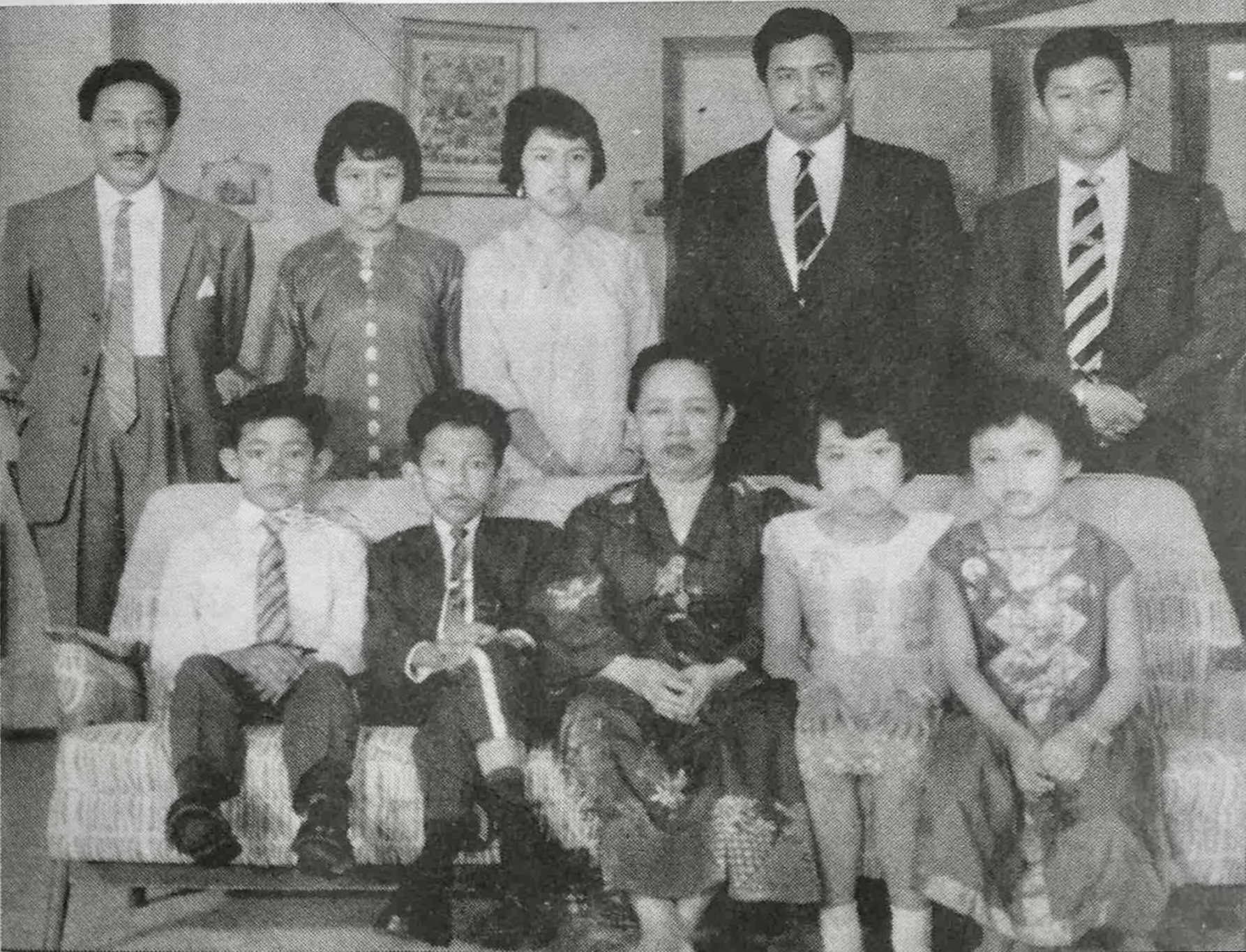
Family photo of Omar Ali Saifuddien in 1965.

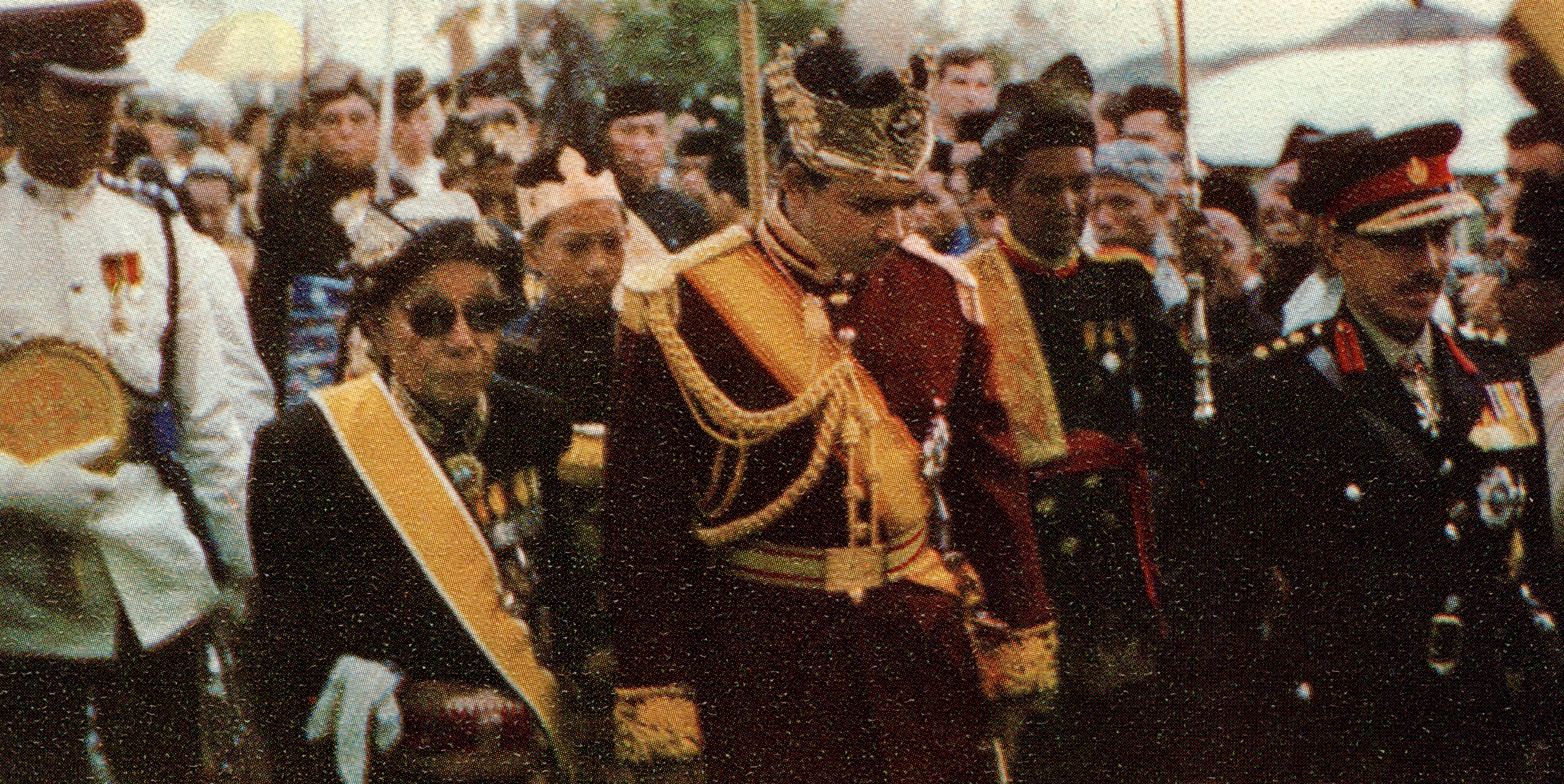
Omar Ali Saifuddien (right) at the wedding of his son, Hassanal Bolkiah, on 29 July 1965.

Omar Ali Saifuddien wed Dayang Siti Amin binti Awang Hashim (Note: Later known as Dayang Siti Amin binti Pehin Orang Kaya Pekerma Setia Laila Diraja Awang Haji Hashim) upon his return from Kuala Belait to Brunei Town in 1937. The couple divorced in 1944. He wanted to get married again because the first marriage ended without children. At Istana Banderung Kayangan on Saturday, 6 September 1941, (Note: After an earlier meeting with a representative of the Limbang Pengirans and Sultan Ahmad Tajuddin in February 1941, MacBryan was able to effectively arrange settlements with both parties, resulting in Omar Ali Saifuddien receiving 2,000 Straits dollars as a wedding present.) he married his cousin, Pengiran Anak Damit, as his second wife; she was his cousin as the great-granddaughter of Sultan Hashim Jalilul Alam Aqamaddin.

The royal wedding was held in accordance with all of the ceremonial customs of the royal family, including the custom of bertunggu tunang (waiting for the fiancé). A selection of poetry was read aloud, including Syair Rakis written by Pengiran Muhammad Salleh, Syair Yang Di-Pertuan written by Abdul Razak, a poem written by Pengiran Damit Sikitri, Syair Awang Semaun, and some Syair Rajang whose authors were unknown, during the customary Istadat Berjaga-jaga held every night of the wedding.

They had 10 children:

- Prince (later Sultan) Hassanal Bolkiah (born 1946)
- Prince Mohamed Bolkiah (born 1947)
- Princess Masna (born 1948)
- Princess Nor'ain (born 1950)
- Prince Sufri Bolkiah (born 1952)
- Prince Jefri Bolkiah (born 1954)
- Princess Amal Umi Kalthum Al-Islam (born 1956)
- Princess Amal Rakiah (born 1957)
- Princess Amal Nasibah (born 1958)
- Princess Amal Jefriah (born 1964)

On 13 September 1979, his wife, Pengiran Anak Damit died. After that, for the last time, he married Pengiran Anak Salhah, who was also his wife's sister.

=== Personal interests ===
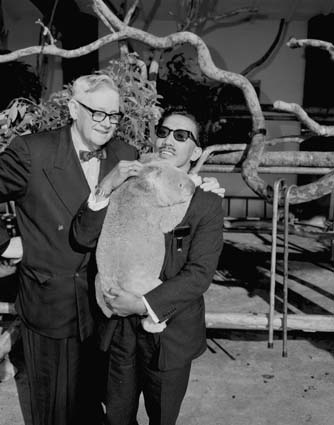
Edward Hallstrom and Omar Ali Saifuddien (carrying a koala) at Taronga Park Zoological Gardens in Sydney, 1964.

Omar Ali Saifuddien enjoyed playing traditional Bruneian activities as a child, including pancak silat, main tatak garis, kuit, and main gasing. He also passed time by occasionally assisting his father in his carpentry work, a pastime that was uncommon among children at the time. In addition, he enjoyed playing hockey, football, chess, hunting, speedboat racing, squash, badminton, tug of war, and swimming. He also enjoyed collecting items such as weapons, walking canes, keris, and firearms. He was fascinated by walking canes for their craftsmanship and ornamental patterns.

In his free time, especially following the Isyak prayers, he enjoyed reciting zikir songs with Pehin-Pehin Manteri Ugama. He also enjoyed paying surprise visits to people he knew at their residences. He never explained the reasons for these abrupt visits. He occasionally used to till the lawn and excavate the area in order to do some gardening. He also gardened, and he went on net fishing trips to Muara, typically accompanied by Pengiran Abdul Rahim, Pengiran Abdul Kadir, and Pengiran Sulaiman. He also designed the national medals.

Omar Ali Saifuddien has composed numerous poems expressing his desire to struggle for the nation's independence, including Syair Nasihat, Syair Asli Rajang Hari (1967), Syair Rajang Jenaka, Syair Perkakas Pekarangan, Syair Perlembagaan Negeri Brunei (1960), Rampaian Laila Syair (1966), Syair Laila Hasrat, Syair Laila Cinta, Syair Laila Jenaka, Syair Rajang Jawi, and Syair Kemerdekaan (1984).

Omar Ali Saifuddien was known for being an Anglophile. He was an admirer of British wartime Prime Minister Winston Churchill. His respect for Churchill was reflected in the establishment of the Churchill Memorial Building in Bandar Seri Begawan, opened in 1971 by his son. Costing an estimated $5 million, it was the world's only museum dedicated solely to Churchill, and its opening was attended by Churchill's daughter, Mary Soames.

== Legacy ==
During his seventeen-year reign, Omar Ali Saifuddien played a role in shaping modern Brunei Darassalam. He introduced the Melayu Islam Beraja (MIB) philosophy, the nation's guiding ideology. To prepare the country for the restoration of full sovereignty, an effort initiated by his predecessor and driven by the Brunei nationalist movement at the end of World War II, he implemented significant social and economic reforms. He is remembered as the Architect of Modern Brunei, Royal Poet, Father of Brunei Negara Zikir, and Father of Independence. As a result of his policies, mosques, suraus (prayer halls), religious halls, government office buildings, and schools were built across the country to further the spread of the Islamic faith. In a 2007 titah marking the 22nd National Day, Hassanal Bolkiah mentioned his father's contributions to national development, saying they were carried out with dedication and without external pressure.

=== Things named after him ===
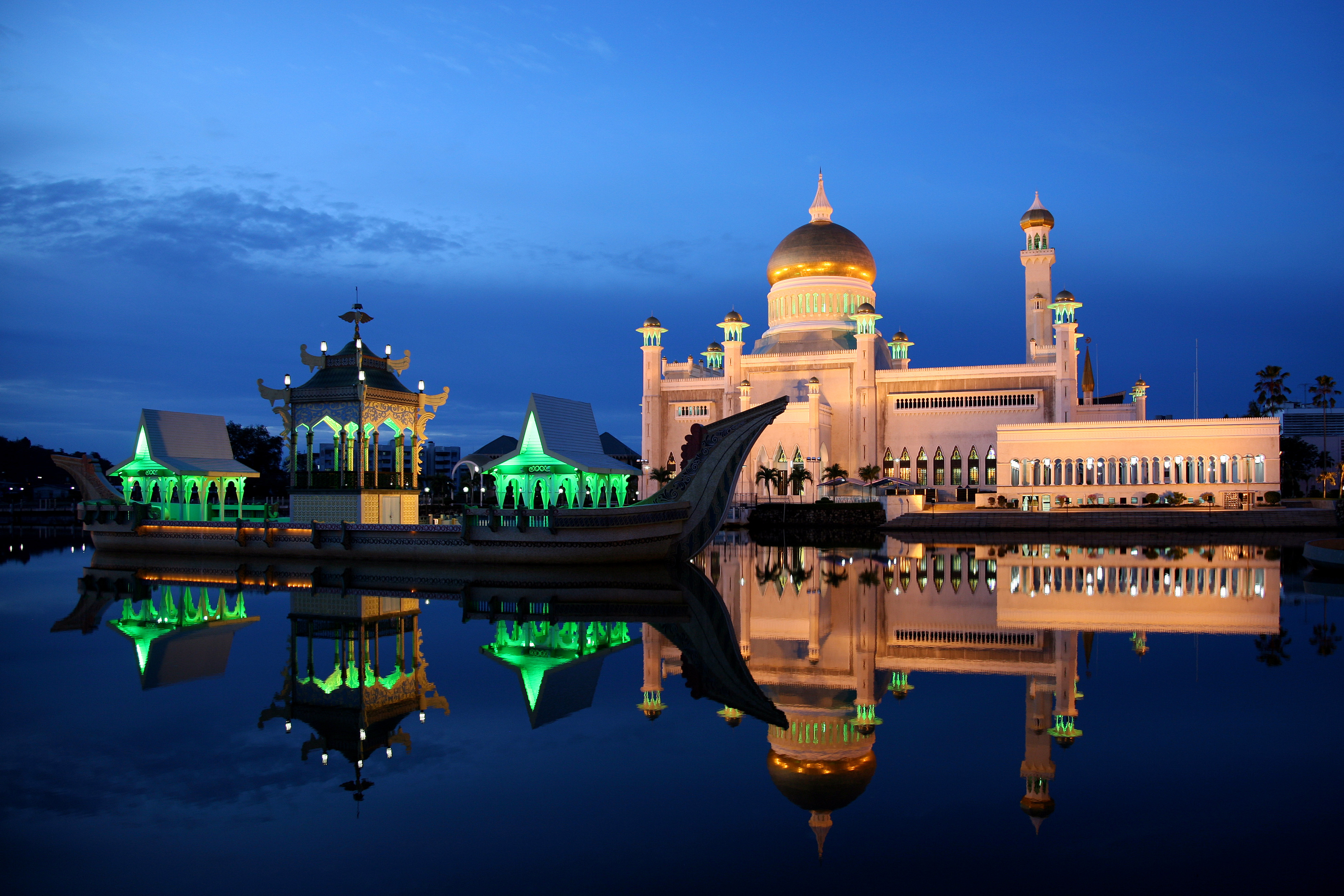
Omar Ali Saifuddin Mosque.

Several landmarks, roads, institutions, and public spaces in Brunei are named in honour of Omar Ali Saifuddien III. Brunei Town was renamed Bandar Seri Begawan on 4 October 1970, when he assumed the title Paduka Seri Begawan Sultan. Roads bearing his name include: Jalan Sultan Omar 'Ali Saifuddien in Pusat Bandar and Jalan Sultan Omar Ali Saifuddien in Berakas Camp. Other structures named after him include the Sultan Haji Omar Ali Saifuddien Bridge, the Sultan Omar Ali Saifuddien Pedestrian Bridge at the Taman Mahkota Jubli Emas, and Taman Haji Sir Muda Omar 'Ali Saifuddien.

Religious and educational institutions also commemorate him. These include the Omar Ali Saifuddin Mosque, the Paduka Seri Begawan Sultan Omar Ali Saifuddien Mosque in Kampong Katimahar, Paduka Seri Begawan Sultan Science College, Seri Begawan Religious Teachers University College in Batu Satu, Sultan Omar 'Ali Saifuddien Centre for Islamic Studies (SOASCIS) at Universiti Brunei Darussalam, and Sultan Omar Ali Saifuddien College.

Omar Ali Saifuddien III's portrait appeared on the obverse of Brunei's 1967 coin series, with the reverse, and all subsequent designs, created by Christopher Ironside. The coins were issued in denominations of 1, 5, 10, 20, and 50 cents. His image also featured on all the first issue banknotes of 1967, in denominations of 1, 5, 10, 50, and 100 Bruneian dollar notes, and it remains on Brunei's current 500 dollar notes. In addition, a scene of him crowning his son as his successor is shown on the reverse of the commemorative 25 dollar note dated 1992.

=== Honours ===
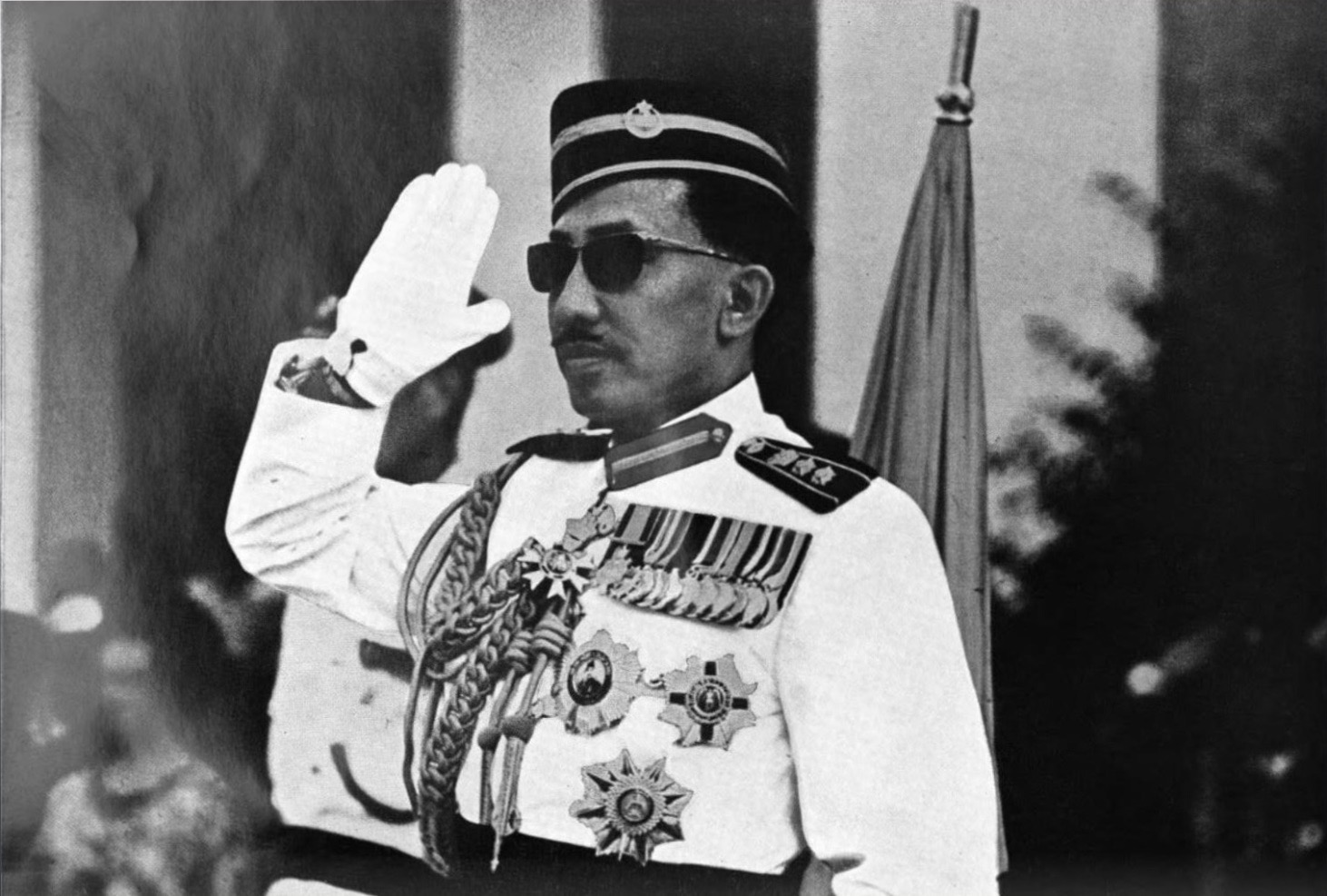
Omar Ali Saifuddien wearing his ceremonial dress in 1964

The honours given to him is as follows:

==== National ====
- Royal Family Order of the Crown of Brunei (DKMB)
- Family Order of Laila Utama (DK) – Dato Laila Utama
- Order of Setia Negara Brunei First Class (PSNB) – Dato Seri Setia
- Order of Seri Paduka Mahkota Brunei First Class (SPMB) – Dato Seri Paduka
- Order of Islam Brunei First Class (PSSUB) – Dato Paduka Seri Setia
- Order of Paduka Laila Jasa Keberanian Gemilang First Class (DPKG) – Dato Paduka Seri
- Order of Paduka Keberanian Laila Terbilang First Class (DPKT) – Dato Paduka Seri
- Order of Pahlawan Negara Brunei First Class (PSPNB) – Dato Seri Pahlawan
- Order of Paduka Seri Laila Jasa First Class (PSLJ) – Dato Paduka Seri Laila Jasa
- Order of Perwira Agong Negara Brunei First Class (PANB)
- Sultan Hassanal Bolkiah Medal (PHBS)
- General Service Medal (Armed Forces)
- Police Long Service Medal (PKLP)
- Long Service Medal (PKL)

==== Foreign ====
- United Kingdom
  - Honorary Companion of the Order of St Michael and St George (CMG) (1 May 1951)
  - Honorary Knight Commander of the Order of St Michael and St George (KCMG) (9 June 1953)
  - Honorary Knight Grand Cross of the Royal Victorian Order (GCVO)
  - Queen Elizabeth II Coronation Medal (2 June 1953)
- Malaya
  - Honorary Recipient of the Order of the Crown of the Realm (DMN, 26 April 1959)
- Johor
  - First Class of the Royal Family Order of Johor (DK I, 11 February 1960)
  - Sultan Ibrahim Diamond Jubilee Medal (1955)
- Kelantan
  - Recipient of the Royal Family Order of Kelantan (DK, 26 April 1959)
- Selangor
  - First Class of the Royal Family Order of Selangor (DK I, 1961)
  - Sultan Salahuddin Silver Jubilee Medal (3 September 1985)

== Notes ==
Omar Ali Saifuddien III House of Bolkiah Born: 23 September 1914
Regnal titles
Preceded by Ahmad Tajuddin	Sultan of Brunei; 1950–1967	Succeeded by Hassanal Bolkiah
Preceded by Pengiran Anak Abdul Rahman	Pengiran Bendahara Seri Maharaja Permaisuara; 1947–1950	Succeeded by Pengiran Anak Muhammad Yasin
Political offices
New title Position established	Minister of Defence of Brunei; 1 January 1984 – 7 September 1986	Succeeded by Hassanal Bolkiah
