= Brunei Cabinet 1988 =

- Date formed: 1988
- Date dissolved: 2005

People and organisations
- Head of state: Hassanal Bolkiah, Prime Minister of Brunei
- Head of government: Hassanal Bolkiah, Sultan of Brunei
- Total no. of members: 11

History
- Election: None
- Predecessor: Brunei Cabinet 1986
- Successor: Brunei Cabinet 2005

Council of Ministers 1988–2005 is the third cabinet of the Government of Brunei from 30 November 1988 to 24 May 2005.

== List of Ministers ==
Below are the list of members in the Council:

Portfolio	Holder	
Prime Minister (Also Defence)	KDYMM Paduka Seri Baginda Sultan Haji Hassanal Bolkiah Mu’izzaddin Waddaulah	
Special Advisor to His Majesty the Sultan in the Prime Minister Office	YB Pehin Orang Kaya Laila Setia Bakti Diraja Dato Laila Utama Haji Awang Isa bin Awang Ibrahim	
Ministry	Minister	Deputy
Defence	KDYMM Paduka Seri Baginda Sultan Haji Hassanal Bolkiah Mu’izzaddin Waddaulah	Pengiran Sanggamara Diraja Brigadier Jeneral Pengiran Haji Ibnu bin Haji Apong
Foreign Affairs	DYTM Paduka Seri Pengiran Perdana Wazir Sahibul Himmah Wal-Waqar Pengiran Muda Haji Mohamed Bolkiah	Dato Paduka Awang Haji Mohd.Ali bin Haji Mohd Daud
Finance	DYTM Paduka Seri Pengiran Digadong Sahibul Mal Pengiran Muda Haji Jefri Bolkiah	Dato Paduka Seri Laila Jasa Haji Awang Ahmad Wally Skinner
Home Affairs	YB Pehin Orang Kaya Laila Setia Bakti Diraja Dato Laila Utama Haji Awang Isa bin Awang Ibrahim	Dato Paduka Haji Awang Abidin bin Abdul Rashid
Education	YB Pehin Orang Kaya Laila Wijaya Dato Seri Setia Haji Awang Abdul Aziz bin Awang Umar	Dato Seri Laila Jasa Awang Haji Ahmad bin Haji Jumat
Law	YAM Pengiran Laila Kanun Diraja Pengiran Bahrin bin Haji Abbas	
Industry and Primary Resources	YB Pehin Orang Kaya Setia Pahlawan Dato Seri Setia Awang Abdul Rahman bin Haji Mohamed Taib	
Religious Affairs	YB Pehin Orang Kaya Ratna Diraja Dato Seri Utama Ustaz Haji Awang Mohd.Zain bin Haji Serudin	Pehin Siraja Khatib Dato Paduka Seri Setia Ustaz Haji Awang Yahya bin Haji Ibrahim,
Development	YB Pengiran Dato Seri Laila Jasa Dr. Ismail bin Pengiran Haji Damit	
Culture, Youth and Sports	YB Pehin Jawatan Luar Pekerma Raja Dato Seri Paduka Haji Awang Hussein bin Haji Mohammad Yusof	Dato Paduka Awang Haji Selamat bin Haji Munap
Health	YB Dato Paduka Dr.Haji Johar bin Dato Haji Noordin	
Communications	YB Dato Seri Laila Jasa Haji Awang Zakaria bin Haji Sulaiman	
