= Malaysian Solidarity Consultative Committee =

The Malaysian Solidarity Consolidation Committee (MSCC) was an organisation formed by political leaders from Federation of Malaya, Singapore, North Borneo, Sarawak, and Brunei Darassalam (as observer), after a preliminary discussion on the formation of the federation of Malaysia at the Commonwealth Parliamentary Regional Conference of July 1961 held in Singapore. The committee was formed to continue the explanations and discussion regarding the formation of Malaysia. The delegates in this committee supported formation of Malaysia.

The Committee held its first meeting on 25 August 1961; 65 years ago, in Jesselton, Sabah. Several objectives were resolved during this meeting, including: to collect the views and opinions on the creation of Malaysia, disseminate information regarding Malaysia, encourage discussion on Malaysia, and promote activities that would promote the realisation of Malaysia.

Chairman of MSCC Fuad Stephens witnessed the signing ceremony of the 'Memorandum of Malaysia' blueprint at the Library of Singapore Assembly House on 3 February 1962. The memorandum was submitted to the Cobbold Commission on 23 February 1962.

The MSCC was regarded as "non-representative" enough to submit recommendations to the Cobbold Commission. However, Dato Wong Pow Nee and Enche M. Ghazali bin Shafie from the Cobbold Commission opined that the participants in the MSCC were either leaders of political parties, or heads of their communities, with some of them members of the state legislature, executive council, and supreme council, thus warranting serious consideration.

The MSCC also recognised that Brunei is a self-governing state, unlike the crown colonies of Sarawak and North Borneo; thus the Cobbold Commission jurisdiction did not extend to Brunei. Therefore, Brunei can negotiate directly with the Federation of Malaya and Singapore on the formation of Malaysia.
