= Husain Yusof =

Bruneian educator (1918–2010)

Dato Paduka Husain Yusof DPMB POAS PJK PIKB PKL
- حسين يوسف
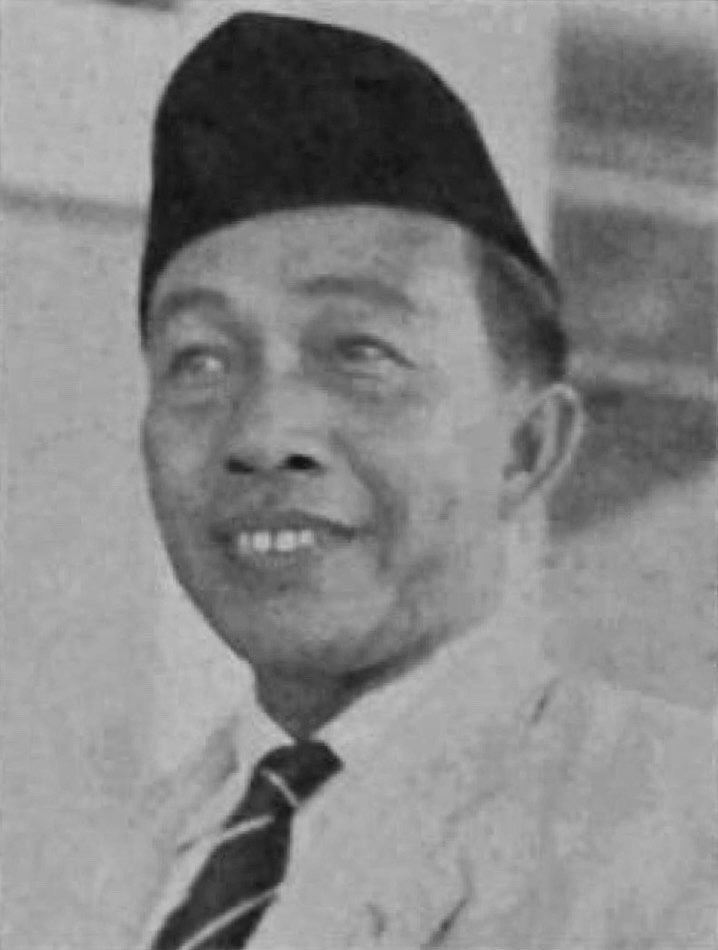
- Mohamed Husain in c. 1961
- Born: 1918; Kampong Sungai Kedayan, Brunei Town, Brunei
- Died: 9 April 2010 (aged 91–92); Kampong Anggerek Desa, Bandar Seri Begawan, Brunei
- Education: Sultan Idris Training College; University of New South Wales
- Occupations: Teacher; civil servant
- Known for: One of the founders of Brunei Teacher's Training Centre

Mohamed Husain bin Mohamed Yusof (Note: At times, his whole state title, Dato Paduka Awang Haji Md. Husain bin Imam Md. Yusof, is used to refer to him.) (1918 – 9 April 2010) was the first Bruneian sent to Australia for teacher training and contributed to founding the Brunei Malay Teacher's College, where he served as a school inspector and professor. Promoted to chief inspector of Malay schools in 1961 and later to deputy inspector in 1967, he retired as inspector in 1973. In his later years, he held positions on the Public Service Commission (PSC) and other educational organisations.

== Early life and education ==
Mohamed Husain bin Mohamed Yusof was born in 1918. His father was Imam Mohamed Yusof and his mother was Dayang Siti Zaleha binti Pehin Orang Kaya Maharaja Diraja Awang Mohammad Daud. During his childhood, he was self educated by his father, along with his siblings and nephews. He began his training as a trainee teacher in 1934, and went to obtain his teacher certificate at the Sultan Idris Training College, Tanjong Malim, British Malaya, from 1937 until 1939.

== Teaching career ==
Husain started working for the Bruneian government as an assistant teacher at the Muara Malay School in 1939 after finishing his education. In 1940, he received a promotion to become the school's headmaster. The next year, he was sent to the Tutong District and worked at the Bukit Bendera Malay School and Tanjong Maya Malay School. He was once more named headmaster of the Brunei Town Malay School following World War II. He was assigned as a teacher in Brunei–Muara, Belait, and Tutong Districts' from 1948 to 1952.

Husain was the first Bruneian to be sent to Australia for a training on teaching techniques at the University of New South Wales, and later became a course officer in Grafton. He also studied the Japanese Administrative System in Sarawak. He was also one of the original founders of the Brunei Malay Teacher's College, where he held the positions of school inspector and professor. Husain was appointed as the chief inspector of Malay schools in 1961, and later to deputy inspector of Malay education in 1967 . On 2 April 1967, in Padang Besar, the 1st Malay Secondary School Annual Games were inaugurated by him. In addition, he received a promotion to inspector in 1970, where he worked until his retirement in 1973.

== Later life and death ==
In his latter years, Husain served in a number of capacities, including a member of the PSC, superintendent of lessons, and secretary of the scholarship committee. His involvement in voluntary organisations includes serving as a District Scout Leader, chairman of the Brunei Malay Teachers Association (PGGMB), and a member of the Brunei Town board.

Husain died on 9 April 2010.

== Honours ==
Throughout his career, he has received the following honours and recognitions:

- Order of Seri Paduka Mahkota Brunei Second Class (DPMB) – Dato Paduka
- Omar Ali Saifuddin Medal (POAS)
- Meritorious Service Medal (PJK)
- Excellent Service Medal (PIKB)
- Long Service Medal (PKL; 23 September 1956)
- Tokoh Guru Berjasa (1997)
