= Sultan Hassanal Bolkiah Institute of Education =

Education research institute at the University of Brunei Darussalam

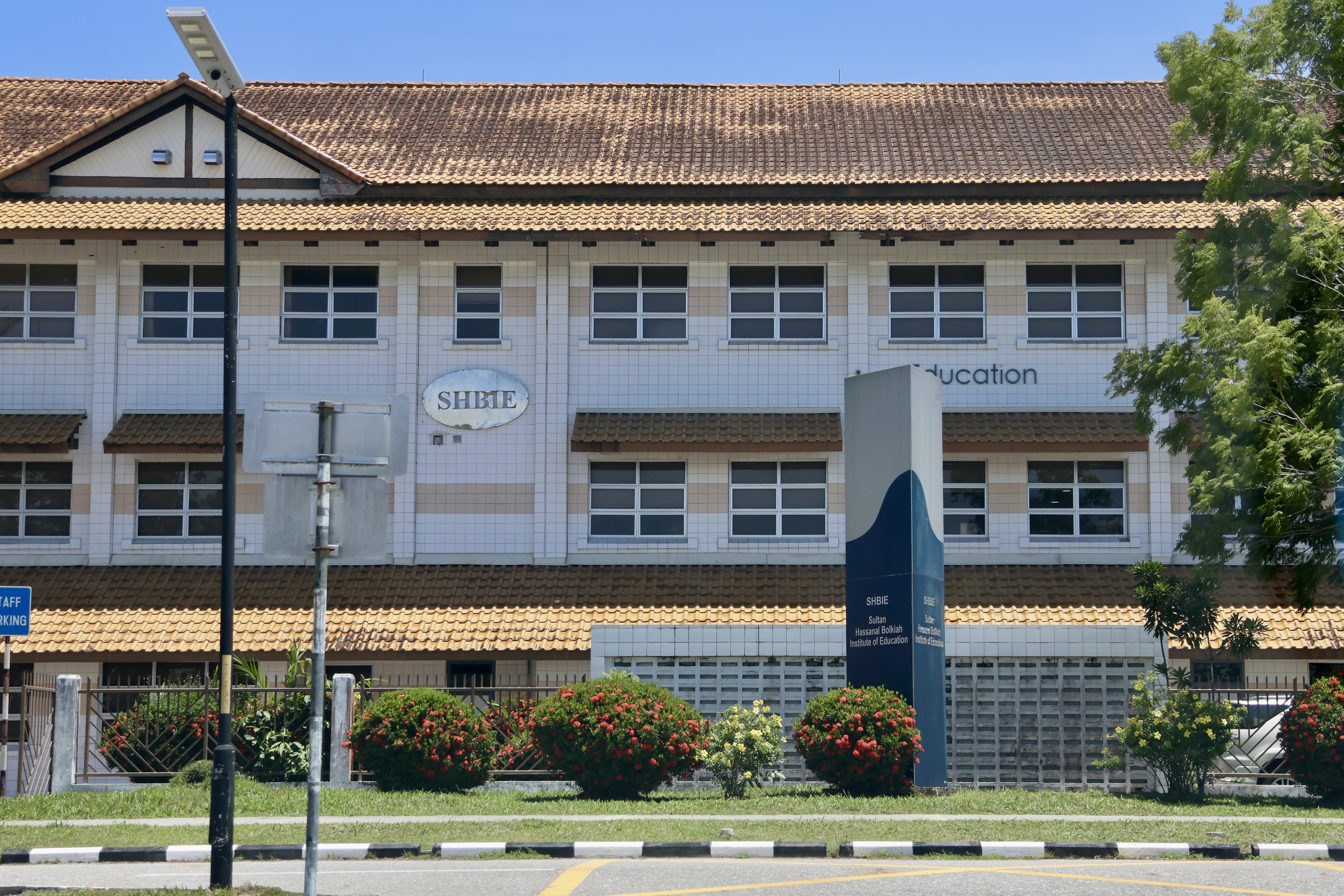
- The institute in 2024
- Parent institution: Universiti Brunei Darussalam
- Established: 16 January 1956
- Mission: Education research
- Focus: Teacher training
- Dean: Hardimah Mohd Said
- Staff: 39
- Formerly called: Brunei Teachers' Training Centre (1956–1958); Brunei Malay Teachers College (1958–1971); Sultan Hassanal Bolkiah Teachers College (1971–1984)
- Location: Universiti Brunei Darussalam, Jalan Universiti, BE1410, Tungku, Brunei-Muara, Brunei
- Coordinates: 4.9753465°N 114.8936214°E
- Website: shbie.ubd.edu.bn

The Sultan Hassanal Bolkiah Institute of Education (SHBIE or Institut Pendidikan Sultan Hassanal Bolkiah) is a Bruneian research institute and graduate school of education, located at the Tungku campus of the Universiti Brunei Darussalam (UBD). It provides graduate programs with both faculty and a curriculum that aims to improve teaching standards and assist the national educational system.

== Namesake ==
Born on 15 July 1946, Hassanal Bolkiah has held the positions of Prime Minister since Brunei's independence from the United Kingdom in 1984 and Sultan of Brunei since 1967. He is among the world's few surviving absolute kings. He is the 29th sultan to take the throne of Brunei after his father abdicated in 1967. He is the oldest son of Raja Isteri Pengiran Anak Damit and Sultan Omar Ali Saifuddien III.

== Overview ==
With a staff of experts with local and worldwide teaching and research expertise, SHBIE is an important training ground for teachers. The institute specialises in educating educational administrators in addition to preparing instructors for elementary, secondary, and vocational education. In order to improve educational practices and increase possibilities within the education sector, SHBIE also provides courses in specialised educational fields such guidance and counselling, remedial teaching, and curriculum design.

== History ==
Before Brunei established its own teacher training college, the sending of trainee teachers to study overseas began in 1930. (Note: The Sultan Idris Training College in Malaysia, the Batu Lintang Teacher Training College in Kuching, Sarawak, or the United Kingdom were among the foreign locations where Brunei's teachers received their training.) The Bruneian government planned to enhance Malay education in accordance with the education policy that gives priority to the use of the Malay language. Two trainee teachers, Marsal Maun and Basir Taha, were sent to the Sultan Idris Training College in Tanjong Malim, Perak. On 16 January 1956, the foundation was laid for the establishment of the Brunei Teachers' Training Centre (BTTC; Pusat Latihan Perguruan Brunei), (Note: Husain Yusof was also one of the original founders of the institution.) which was initially housed in temporary dormitory buildings and a kajang (camp or accommodation) at the lower block of the current Sultan Muhammad Jamalul Alam Malay School in Tungkadeh, while classes were conducted at the Sultan Omar Ali Saifuddien College in Brunei Town. By 1957, an additional 20 students were registered at the college, which had two lecturers: one from Malaya and the other a local, Cikgu Haji Mohd Sum bin Hashim. It offered as a course in college was the English language. As per the study policy, only students who were Bruneian are admitted to get training, and instruction was given in Malay as the sole language and medium.

The concept of building a permanent facility for the teacher training college emerged soon after the establishment of the country's first teacher training institution in 1956, primarily to accommodate the increasing number of students. The initial intake of 22 students, along with concerns that the existing structure was aging and at risk of collapsing, further underscored the need for a new building. By the end of 1957, the institution had successfully trained 14 teachers in its inaugural batch. In 1958, plans were initiated to construct a fully furnished new facility for the teacher training college. Located in Berakas, a rural area near the former Brunei Airport, the institution was renamed the Brunei Malay Teachers College (Maktab Perguruan Melayu Brunei; MPMB). By 1959, the permanent building was completed in Berakas, which is now home to Berakas Secondary School.

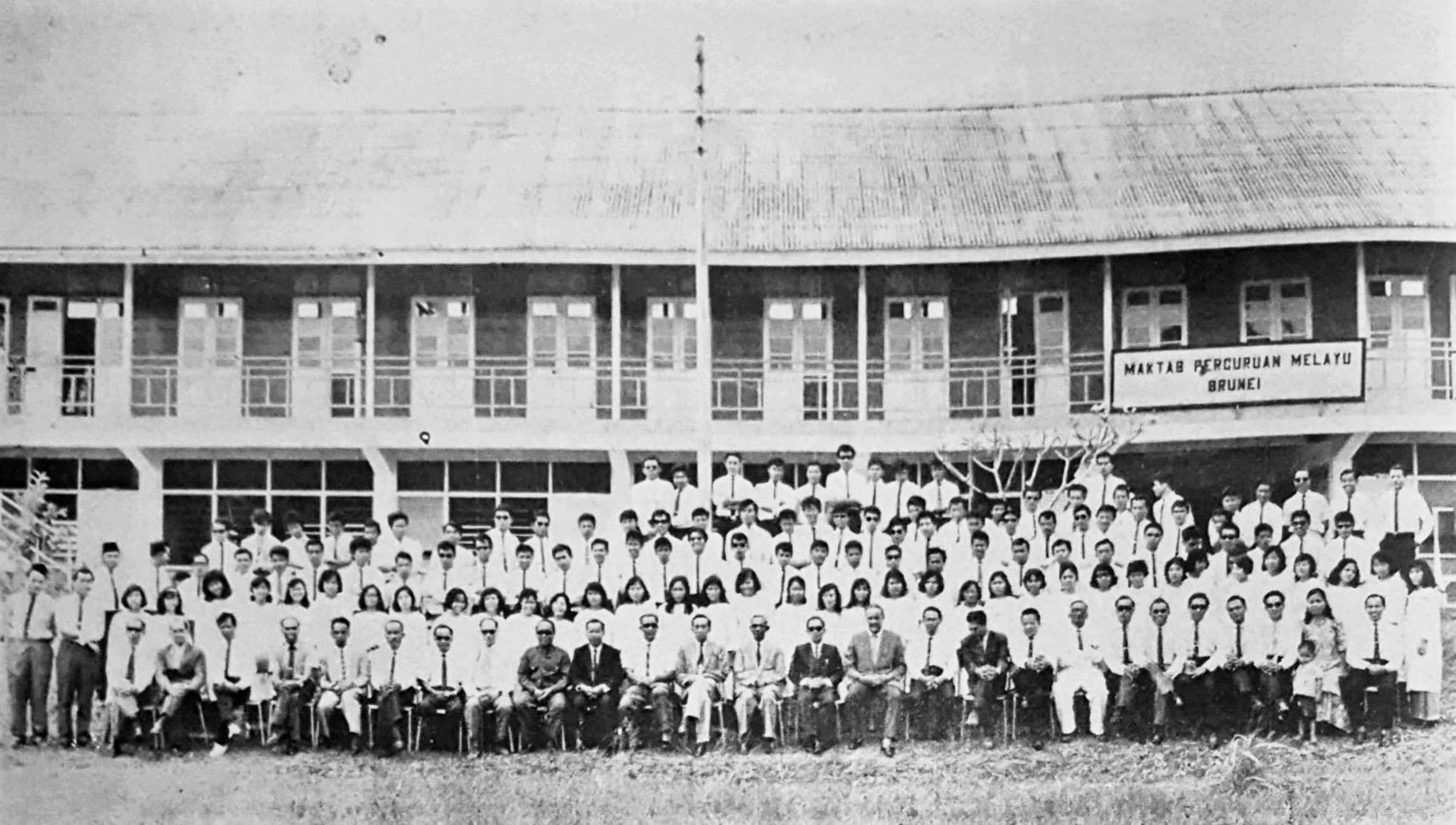
A group photo of the Brunei Malay Teachers College in 1967

In 1961, Othman Bidin became the first local Bruneian to be appointed as principal of the college. On Thursday, 16 March 1967, in the evening, Assistant Minister of Education Lukan Uking, presided over the Malay teachers training program in the college's hall. Over the course of two years, 115 teacher trainees from Malay schools around the nation participated in the program. They would given lectures at the college in the afternoon after teaching in their respective schools in the morning. Following their training, the Malay trainee teachers were mostly sent to teach in Malay schools around the state. James Pearce, who served as Brunei's Director of Education, oversaw the college. Two Malay instructors with degrees from Malayan Teachers' Training College at Kirkby and one Malay lecturer from SITC assisted Pearce.

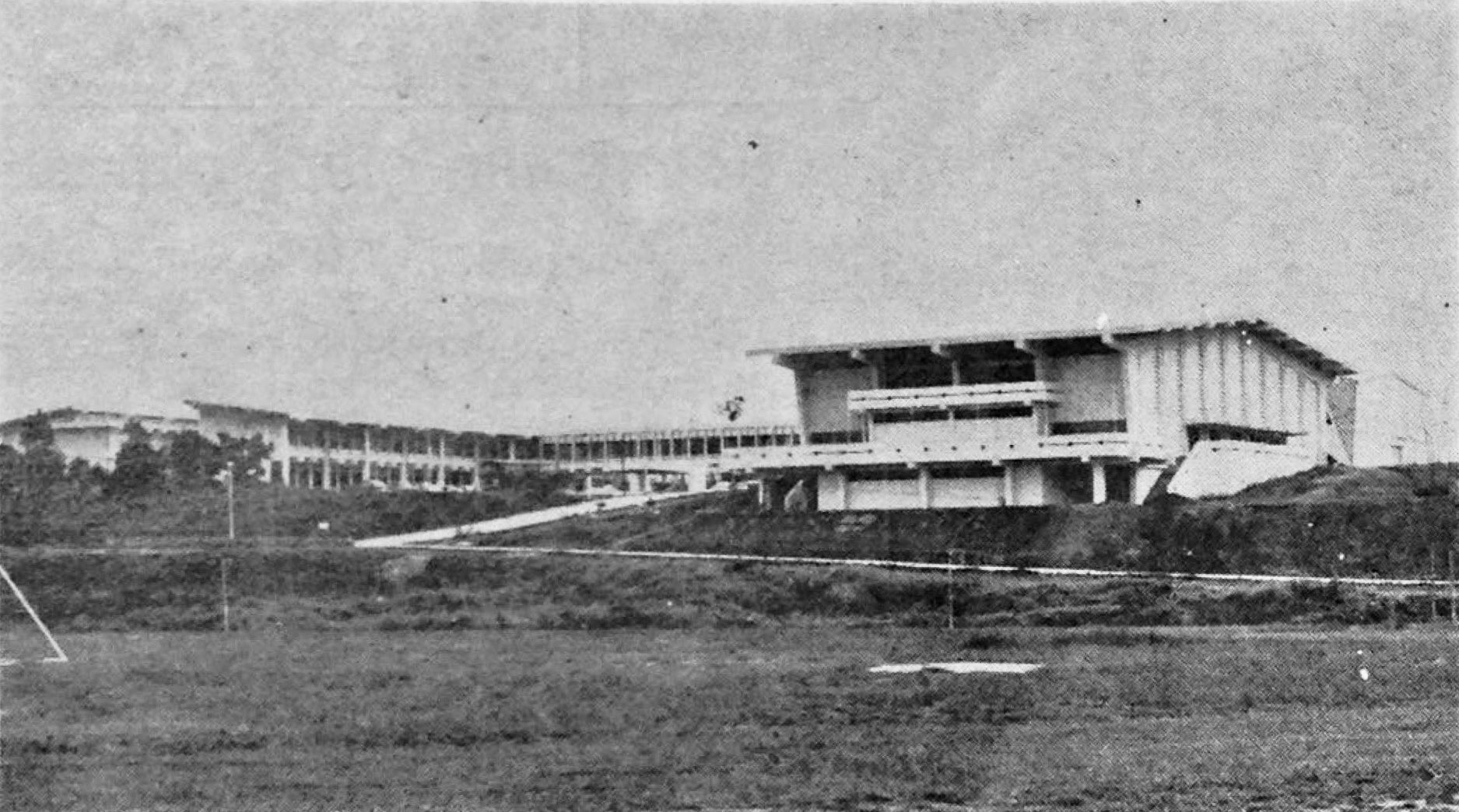
The college in Gadong, c. 1972

A few years later, in 1971, a permanent complex for the college was completed and subsequently renamed Sultan Hassanal Bolkiah Teachers College (Maktab Perguruan Sultan Hassanal Bolkiah; MPSHB) in 1972. During the college's fourth stage of development, which spanned from 1972 to 1985, it underwent another name change and relocated to Gadong, now the UNISSA campus, near Bandar Seri Begawan. On Saturday, 29 January 1972, Sultan Hassanal Bolkiah presided over the opening ceremony of the college on Jalan Gadong, at which point it was officially renamed, as the Sultan consented to have the college bear his name. During a certificate presentation ceremony in the afternoon, students who had finished three years of instruction at the institution were given diplomas by Pengiran Muhammad Yusuf, the Menteri Besar of Brunei. A total of 215 teachers—125 men and 90 women—were awarded certificates at the ceremony. P. D. Parshad was the college's principal at the time. In this phase, the college started to offer a Bachelor in Education (BEd) program.

In 1984, it changed its name again, this time to Sultan Hassanal Bolkiah Institute of Education (SHBIE; Institut Pendidikan Sultan Hassanal Bolkiah). The institute was merged into the UBD in 1988. A major advancement in teacher preparation in Brunei was the Department of Educational Psychology's founding at SHBIE, which expanded special education and counseling programs and offered courses in psychology. The department has been instrumental in promoting psychology in the area since it was first manned by a multinational team of four psychologists. It has created and supported several teacher training programs, arranged important conferences—such as the first international psychological conference in 1997—and worked in tandem with the Ministry of Education on a number of projects.

In 2003, SHBIE made history by producing its first doctoral graduate in Science and Mathematics Education. UBD has implemented several changes since January 2009, one of which is the transformation of SHBIE into a graduate school with graduate-level programs as its exclusive focus. The Psychological Studies and Human Development (PSHD) group, with 22 academic staff members from several psychology-related subjects, replaced the Department of Educational Psychology. Undergraduate programs like the bachelor of primary education (special education) or certifications in counseling and special education are no longer offered by SHBIE. As of 2012, the new Master of Teaching program is currently the focus of SHBIE, and in the upcoming years, plans are to increase psychological courses and postgraduate degrees.

== Research ==
Through its extensive programs and pertinent research, SHBIE focuses on improving teaching standards and assisting efficient school systems. For those looking to develop in their careers, it provides graduate degrees including a Master of Teaching program. In addition, SHBIE promotes an international collaborative atmosphere and offers professional development centred in schools. The research conducted at the institution focuses on design-based methods that enhance instructional materials and learning procedures by fusing theory and practice. With an emphasis on improving teaching quality at all curricular levels, SHBIE's work supports both national and worldwide educational growth.

The graduate programs offered by SHBIE is as follows:

- PhD in education by Research
- Master of Education by Research
- Master of Education by Coursework
- Master of Teaching
- Master in Counselling
