= History of education in Brunei =

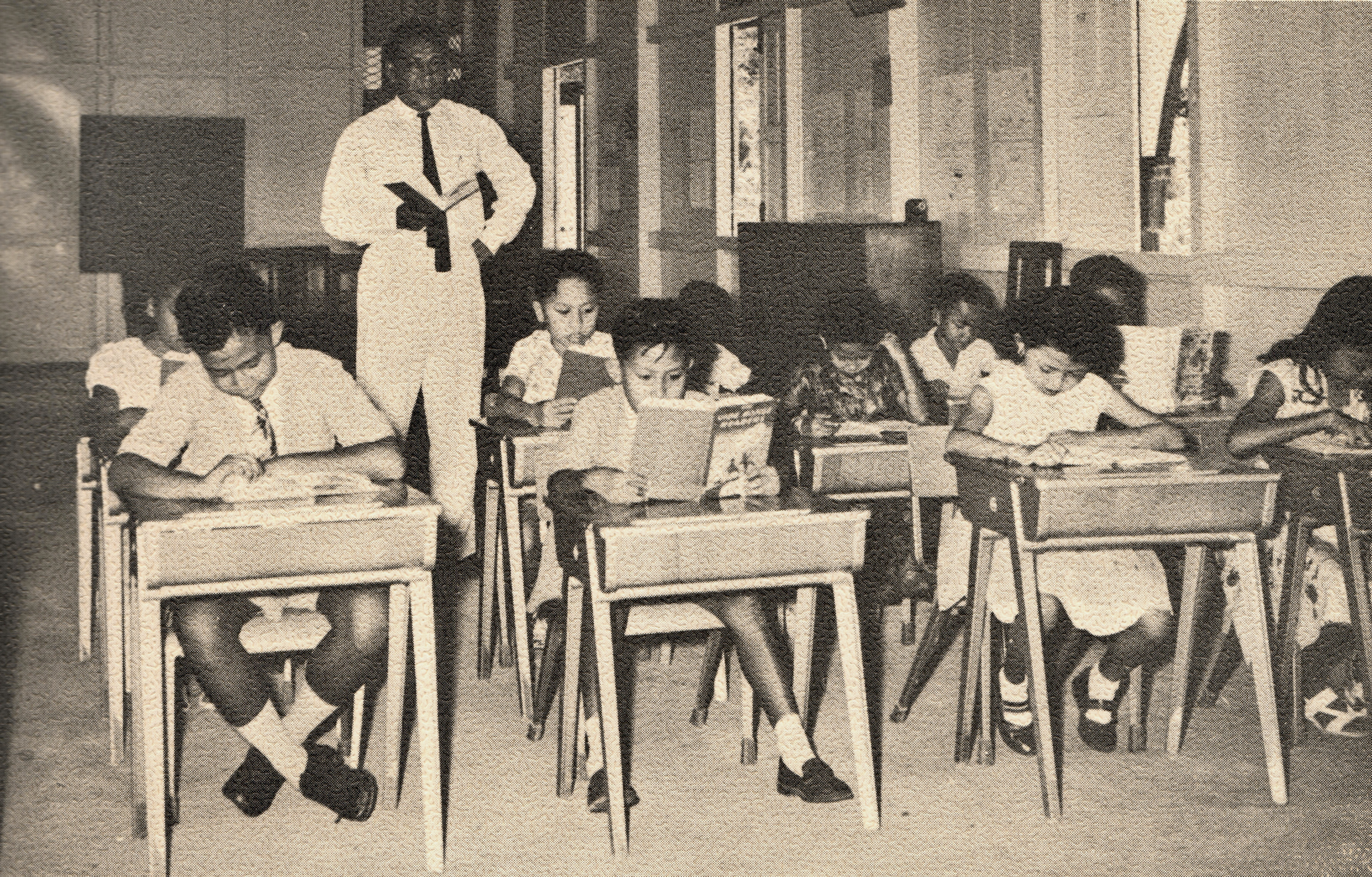
Prince Hassanal Bolkiah (left) studying at the surau of Istana Darul Hana in the 1950s

In the period leading up to its independence in 1984, Brunei developed four successive education policies from 1954 to 1984. The 1962 and 1972 policies faced challenges due to deteriorating relations with Malaysia, which impacted Brunei's efforts to implement Malay as the primary language of teaching. Prior to the formation of Malaysia, Brunei benefited from close educational collaboration with Malaya, but strained relations after Brunei's refusal to join Malaysia hindered the execution of these policies. This highlights how foreign political forces, rather than internal dynamics as seen in countries like Malaysia, India, and Sri Lanka, played a significant role in shaping the success or failure of Brunei's education programs.

Before 1950, Brunei's education system provided only basic education, with slow expansion due to prioritisation of economic development and other issues. Public awareness of the value of formal education was low, and the Malay educational system largely prepared students for low-status jobs, with the highest level being sixth grade. This limitation on educational opportunities hindered local youth from advancing and contributed to slower national progress. British officials intentionally maintained this restricted education program to preserve their control and prevent local youth from pursuing higher education and challenging the existing social and political structure.

== Traditional education system ==
Kampong Ayer, the ancient administrative centre, government, and Islamic culture in Brunei, is where traditional education got its start. Islamic teachings prior to 1906 were the main focus of early education programs offered via balai education systems in mosques and balai-balai (hall for study, communal prayer, hadrah, and religious studies). In the balai education system, students sit in a circle called "beliun," with the teacher positioned on the side ("siring"). The students gather daily after the Zuhr prayer for religious studies, focusing on Quran recitation. The duration for each topic is at the teacher's discretion, and students can request breaks if they feel tired ("singal").

Due to the shortage of educational resources in the old balai system of schooling, the teacher's capacity to communicate understanding was essential. Writing abilities and memorisation capacity were used to evaluate the success of the students. Local and international professors used literature on Sufism, Fiqh, Tauhid, Akhlak, and other Islamic disciplines to teach the students. With the arrival of the British Resident administration, Brunei saw the introduction of a dualistic educational system: the new non-religious system, which covered subjects like science and mathematics and functioned on their own of religious components in Malay, Chinese, and English schools, replaced the already present Islamic religious education system, which concentrated on religious studies.

== Colonial influence and formal education system ==
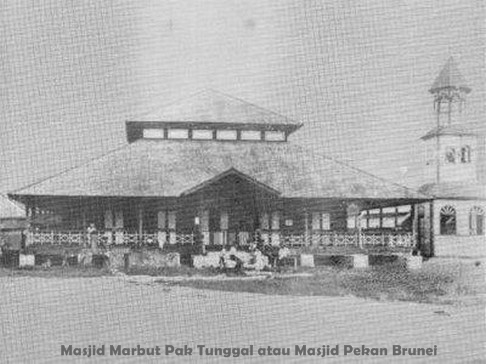
Pekan Brunei Mosuque served as Brunei Town's main mosque

Due to a shortage of professionals in the sector, the first Malay primary school was founded in 1914 with the intention of offering formal education, including instruction in basic reading and writing in Roman script. Because no dedicated structure had been constructed, this school temporary began operations in the mosque of Brunei Town. The mosque was the best location for educational activity at the time. at reality, teaching at the mosque will not only reassure parents that this new education system does not violate religious law, but it also pique their interest in allowing their kids to participate in the newly introduced education system.

At the time, there were thirty pupils, all of whom were male. The school was then relocated to the old Pejabat Monopoli, 'Monopoly Office' building. The Brunei Town Malay school closed for a few weeks in 1915 as a result of the inability to find a suitable substitute for a deceased teacher. To house the current school, a school and teacher's residence were constructed in the same year. The old Lapau has been replaced with a new one, and the Front Hall with its stone pillars was then operational.

To provide more regular schooling for their children, the Chinese community in Brunei Town, also founded a Chinese school in 1916, located in a shophouse. There are 38 students enrolled in this institution as of right now. Mandarin is the language of instruction at this school. Children in Brunei receive an education in English schools in addition to their Islamic, Malay, and Chinese studies. Those who need an English education until the establishment of English government schools were forced to attend mission schools or travel overseas. The government sends students to Labuan who are enrolled in English-language schools abroad. Since 1919, this service has been made to two students annually. That went on until 1941.

Chung Hwa Middle School, the oldest Chinese school in Brunei today, was founded in 1922. A government-run English school was supposed to be established in Brunei in the 1920s, but the proposal was put on hold because of worries that pupils attending English schools—which are primarily supervised by Christian administrators—might be influenced by Christian doctrine. Bruneian wazir dignitaries consisting of Pengiran Bendahara Pengiran Anak Abdul Rahman, Pengiran Pemancha Pengiran Anak Muhammad Yassin and Pengiran Shahbandar Pengiran Anak Hashim, took the decision to start officially teaching religious topics at a Malay school at Jalan Pemancha, in 1931, realising the need of religious education. The first girls' school, the Raja Isteri Girls' High School (STPRI), was established in 1930. (Note: In 1955, work on a new school started, and it was finished in 1957 with a student body of just 24.)

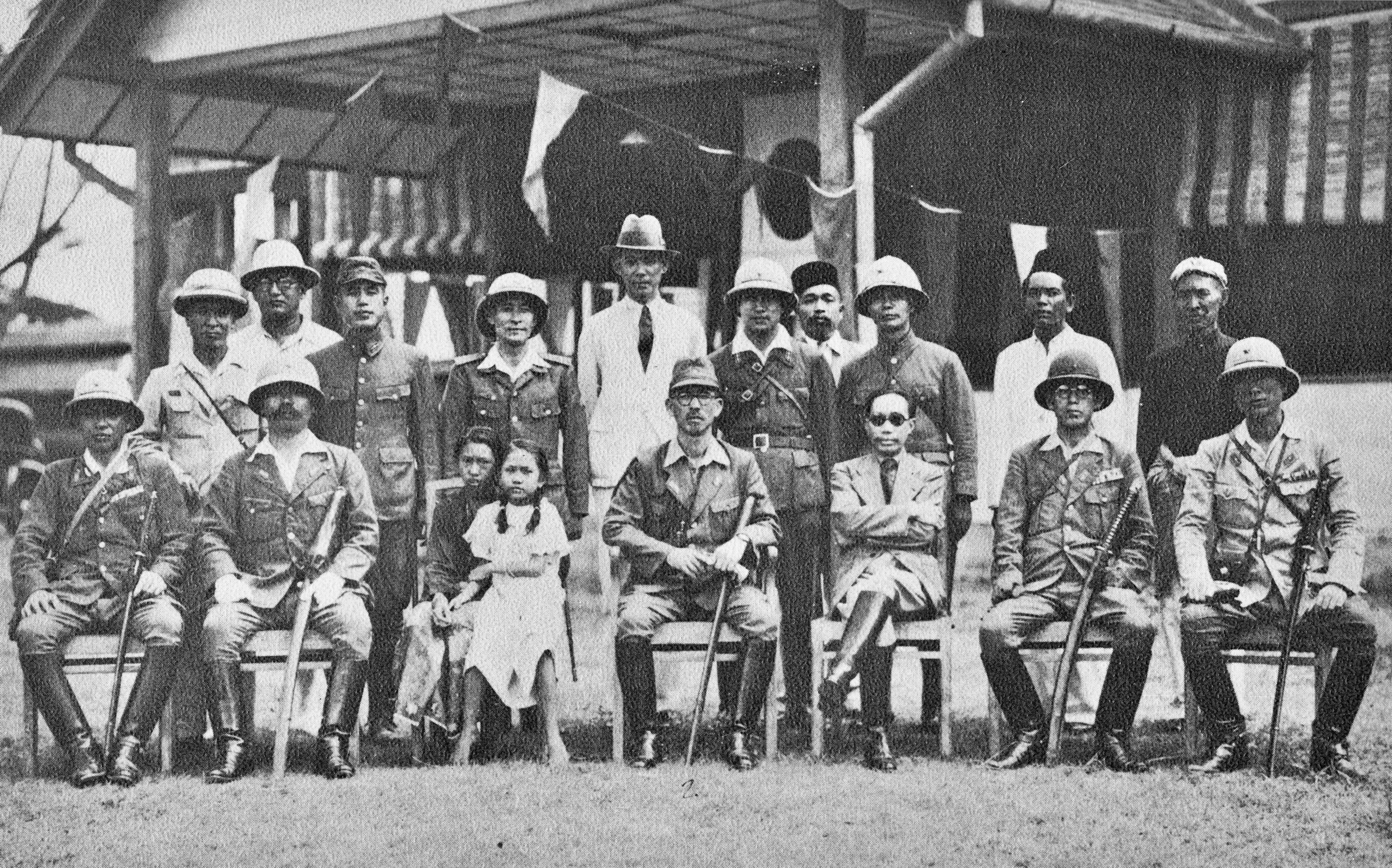
The forces of Maeda Yoshinori and Sultan Ahmad Tajuddin, 1942–1945

Under the reign of Sultan Ahmad Tajuddin in 1940–1941, an Arabic religious school was founded as well, but the World War II interrupted. Meanwhile, propelled by the expansion of the oil sector, growth in education resumed with the opening of mission and private English schools, especially in the Belait District. Education during the Japanese occupation of Brunei was primarily concerned with teaching and learning Japanese. The infrastructure for education in this nation was destroyed at the same time as a result of the occupation. Following the Allied forces' liberation of Brunei in June 1945, the British Military Administration (BMA) took over the nation with the primary objective of reestablishing peace. Nearly all Chinese, Malay, and mission schools were reopened by the end of 1946. But because the educators had departed the country, the Arabic school was no longer in operation.

As a result of improvements made to its educational system, Brunei witnessed a notable rise in school enrolment by the end of 1947 when compared to pre-war levels. But a lot of the youth, especially girls, retained not going to school. Out of 7,778 Malay children aged 5 to 14, only 1,892 (24%), including 334 girls, had been accepted in the 24 Malay schools throughout the state, according to the 1947 population census. The parents' disapproval of formal education was a major contributing factor to the low attendance. There is a similar issue with student attendance in Kampong Ayer. In order to combat this, the government constructed Lela Menchanai Malay School (SMLM), in the center of this community in the 1950s, (Note: Perhaps in 1953, since the author noticed on a sign in the conference room behind the stage that Sultan Omar Ali Saifuddien III had officially opened SMLM in 1953, while the author was a student there from 1976 to 1979.) halfway between Kampong Lorong Sikuna and Kampong Saba.

When the Malay people in Brunei started to realise how important an English education was for improving their job opportunities, they raised concerns about mission schools' possible Christian influence. Kadi Besar and State Council member Pengiran Digadong Pengiran Anak Muhammad Salleh suggested that the government open its own English schools in order to remedy this. By making English education accessible to Malay youth, this proposal attempted to lessen dependency on mission schools and the religious influences they bring with them.

The Sultan Omar Ali Saifuddien College was the first government English school in Brunei, opened in October 1951. The government of Brunei took this action in response to concerns about influence of religion from mission schools and an increasing need for English education. Six boys and three girls from Malay schools made up the first batch. The opening of Anthony Abell College, a government English school in Seria, Belait District, in 1952 gave the local kids more educational options. Concurrent with these advancements were a growth in Chinese, Roman Catholic, and private English schools run by the British Malayan Petroleum Company (BMPC), with BMPC's Senior Staff School in Seria serving the children of European personnel.

== 1954 National Education Policy ==
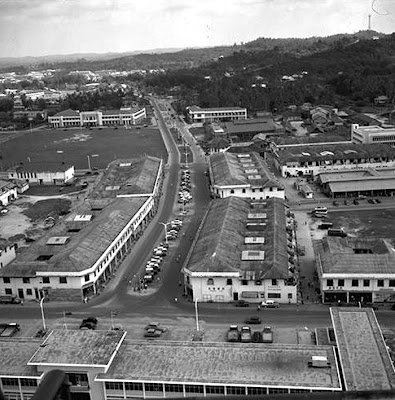
Aerial photograph of Jalan Sultan, Brunei Town in the 1950s

In 1954, the Department of Education in Brunei published its official policy, which emphasised the importance of educated and talented personnel for the country's growth. This policy was in line with the country's first Rancangan Kemajuan Negara, 'National Development Plan' (RKN) from 1953 to 1958. The public and Sultan Omar Ali Saifuddien III exerted pressure for early independence, but there was also a significant drive for a structured educational system, particularly following World War II. Before Malaysia was reformed, the Bruneian community understood the value of formal education thanks to the influence of Malay professors from Sultan Idris Training College in Tanjong Malim, Perak. This led to the establishment of a link between Brunei and Malayan education systems.

The official education policy of Brunei was published in 1954 by the Department of Education, providing an explanation of the educational system. All Malay children were entitled to free education starting at age six under the scheme, which also featured options for vocational training and higher education. Students could choose to attend Malay, English, or vocational schools. It also provided financial support for Mission and Chinese schools, as well as adult literacy programs. This system resembled Malaya's but did not have Tamil schools, demonstrating the influence of Malayan education that the British introduced to Brunei.

Political parties and the general public both criticised the 1954 Education Policy, which sparked debate in the State Council. Government representatives resisted the 1962 proposal by an opposition council member for a national education strategy free from foreign influence, claiming that Brunei had established its own plan and that revisions would add to the government's workload. The British Education Officer acknowledged the progress made in setting up numerous schools and sending students overseas, but the policy was criticized for its narrow focus on offering opportunities for higher learning. As a result, the proposal was ultimately rejected by the council for lack of support from the majority.

Surprisingly the administration intended to draft a new Dasar Pendidikan Kebangsaan, 'National Education Policy' in 1962, suggesting that the opposition's idea had garnered some traction. The Partai Rakyat Brunei (PRB), which was gaining traction by emphasising education as a major agenda item, had an impact on this decision. The government took the initiative to create a new policy with the goal of meeting the demands of the populace and limiting the party's power. This move was in line with broader nationalist initiatives in Malaya to elevate the national language and revitalize local cultural heritage.

The Bruneian government ended the country's mission schools' funding program in June 1959. The Sultan decided that it would not be appropriate for the government to keep funding Christian educational institutions because Brunei was a Muslim state. The Sultan's decision to cease funding the mission schools will not have an impact on Chinese schools in the state, which are granted a 50% subsidy by the government.

== 1962 National Education Policy ==
Aminuddin Baki and Paul Chang, two education specialists from Malaya, were called in by the Bruneian government in 1959 to examine the country's educational system. The outcome of their investigation was the "Report of Aminuddin Baki and Paul Chang 1959." In order to promote harmony among many ethnic and religious groupings, the report suggested placing children of all races under a single Sistem Pendidikan Kebangsaan, 'National Education System' with Malay serving as the primary language of teaching. It also underlined the necessity of an education system that generates highly trained and skilled Bruneians for a variety of professions, including trade, industry, and administration, since the current system was viewed as oppressive and insufficient in producing a competent labour force.

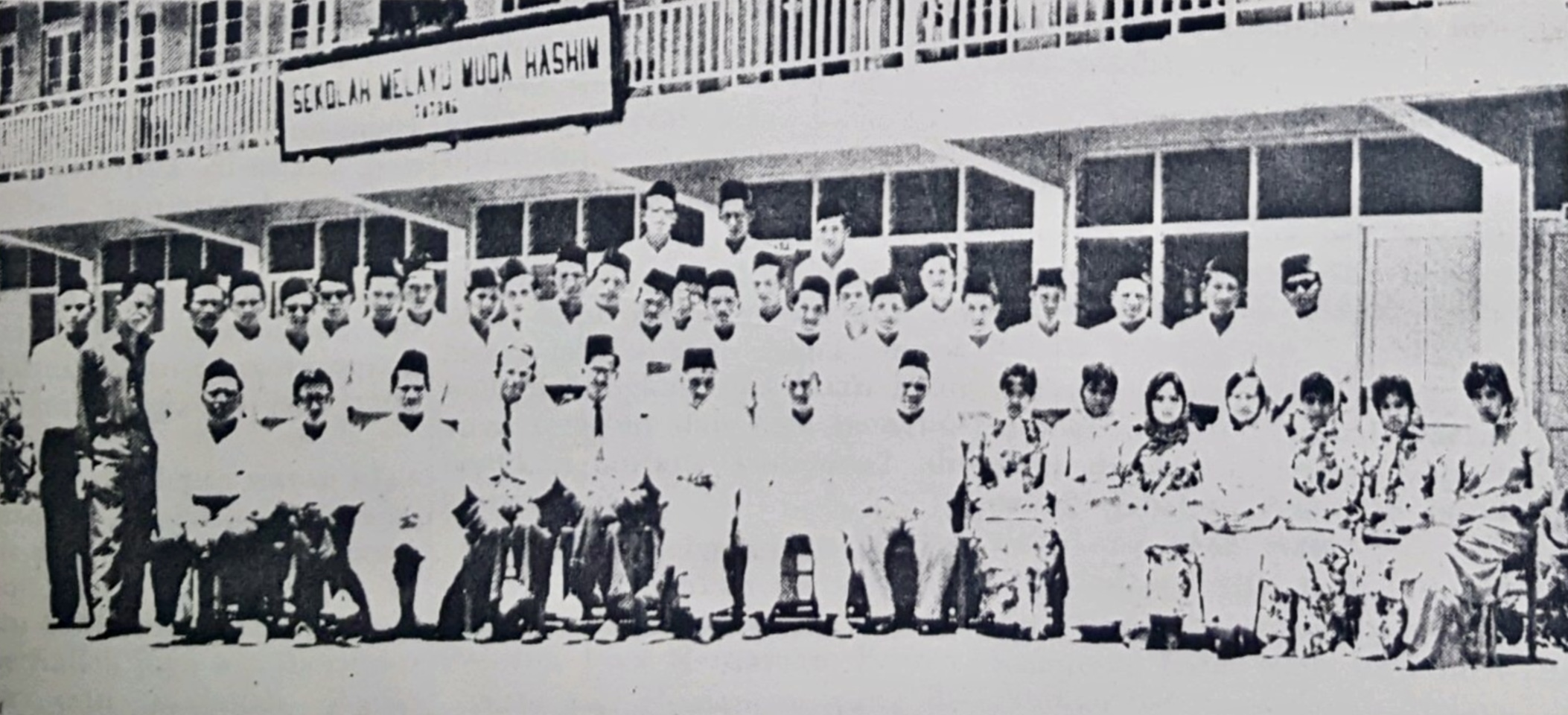
Educators and staff of Muda Hashim Malay School in 1963

Following the Brunei Education Review Committee's evaluation of Aminuddin Baki and Paul Chang's report, the National Education Policy was published on 31 October 1962. This new program, which was greatly impacted by the report, intended to coordinate schools, standardise the curriculum, and bring all children of every ethnic background together under a single educational framework with Malay serving as the major language of teaching. The 1962 Education Policy, which offered educational opportunities for all Bruneians at every educational level, marked a fundamental shift in Brunei's method of education, in contrast to the 1954 policy, which was restricted to Malay students. In keeping with Brunei's monarchical structure and promoting harmony and peace within the nation, the National Education Policy of 1962 also sought to raise a generation of citizens who were devoted to the sultan and the nation. Nevertheless, there were obstacles in the way of the policy's execution, chiefly because of the 8 December 1962, the PRB-led Brunei revolt that threw the nation into anarchy. The government's efforts to restore calm had to take precedence over educational operations, resulting in a stagnation of policy as many schools were converted into military headquarters and detention centers.

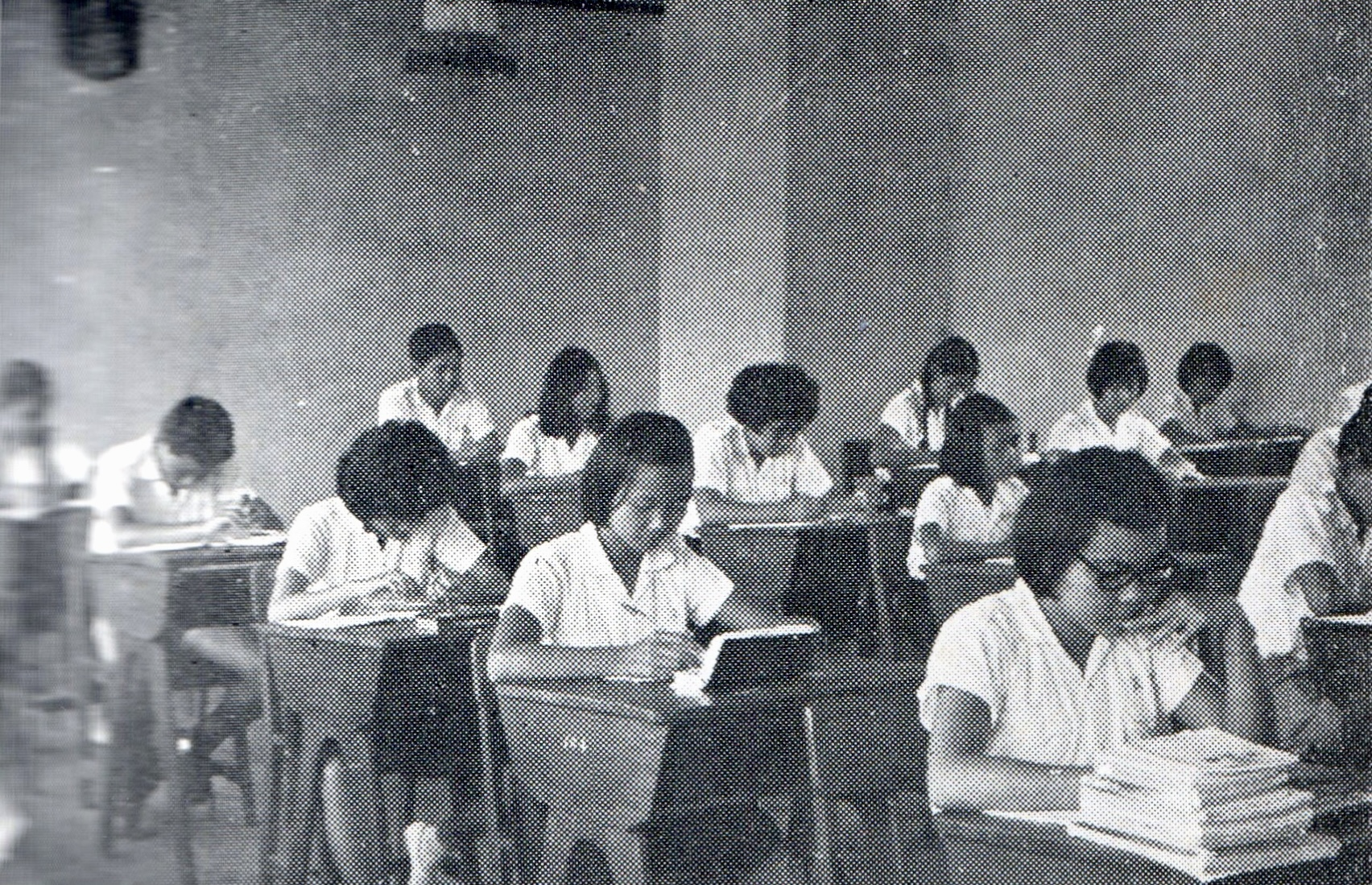
Children studying at Chung Ching Middle School, Seria, in 1968

The 1962 National Education Policy was not successfully implemented, partly due to the influence of Malaysia. The Malayan prime minister, Tunku Abdul Rahman, suggested Brunei, Sarawak, and British Sabah form a Malaysian Federation in May 1961. On 9 July 1963, Sultan Omar Ali Saifuddien III finally turned down an offer to join Malaysia, despite his earlier willingness to do so if it served Brunei's interests. The absence of a proposal for the sultan to become the Yang di-Pertuan Agong, large financial requirements from Malaysia, and possible British influence are among the reasons given by historians for Brunei's reluctance. Tunku Abdul Rahman retaliated by removing Malaysian educators and officers from Brunei, which made problems in the country's public administration worse.

Brunei substituted Malaysian officials with British officers after declining Malaysia's offer of federation, which made it harder to carry out the 1962 National Education Policy. It was difficult to establish Malay as the primary language of teaching and to create a complete education system without any kind of Malaysian backing. Due to linguistic barriers and political instability aggravated by Indonesia's backing of the PRB during the 1962 revolt, Brunei also refrained from implementing the Indonesian educational system. The situation at hand highlighted the significant impact of Malaysia on Brunei's educational system and the execution of its policies.

== 1972 National Education Policy ==
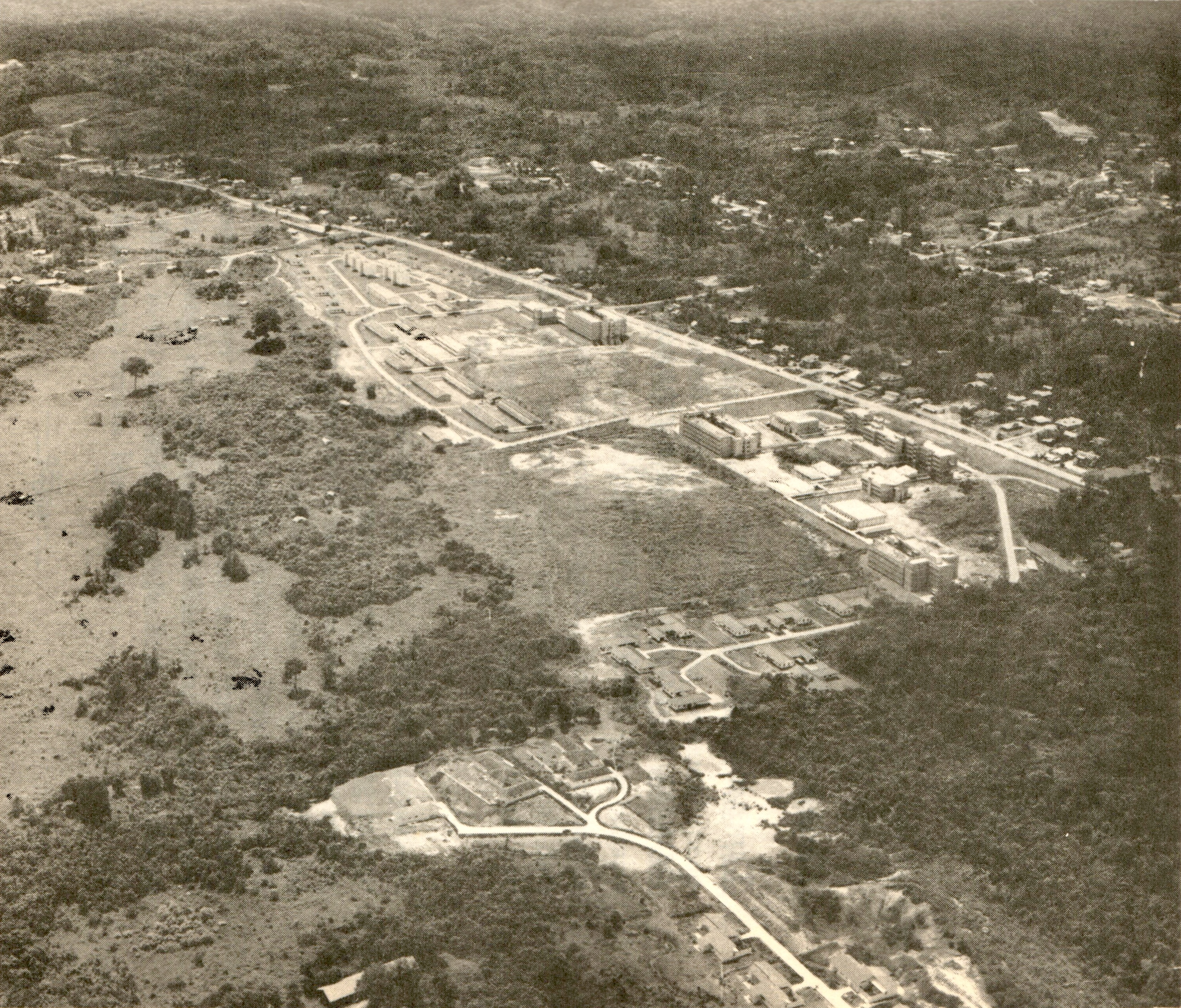
Paduka Seri Begawan Sultan Malay College under construction around 1971

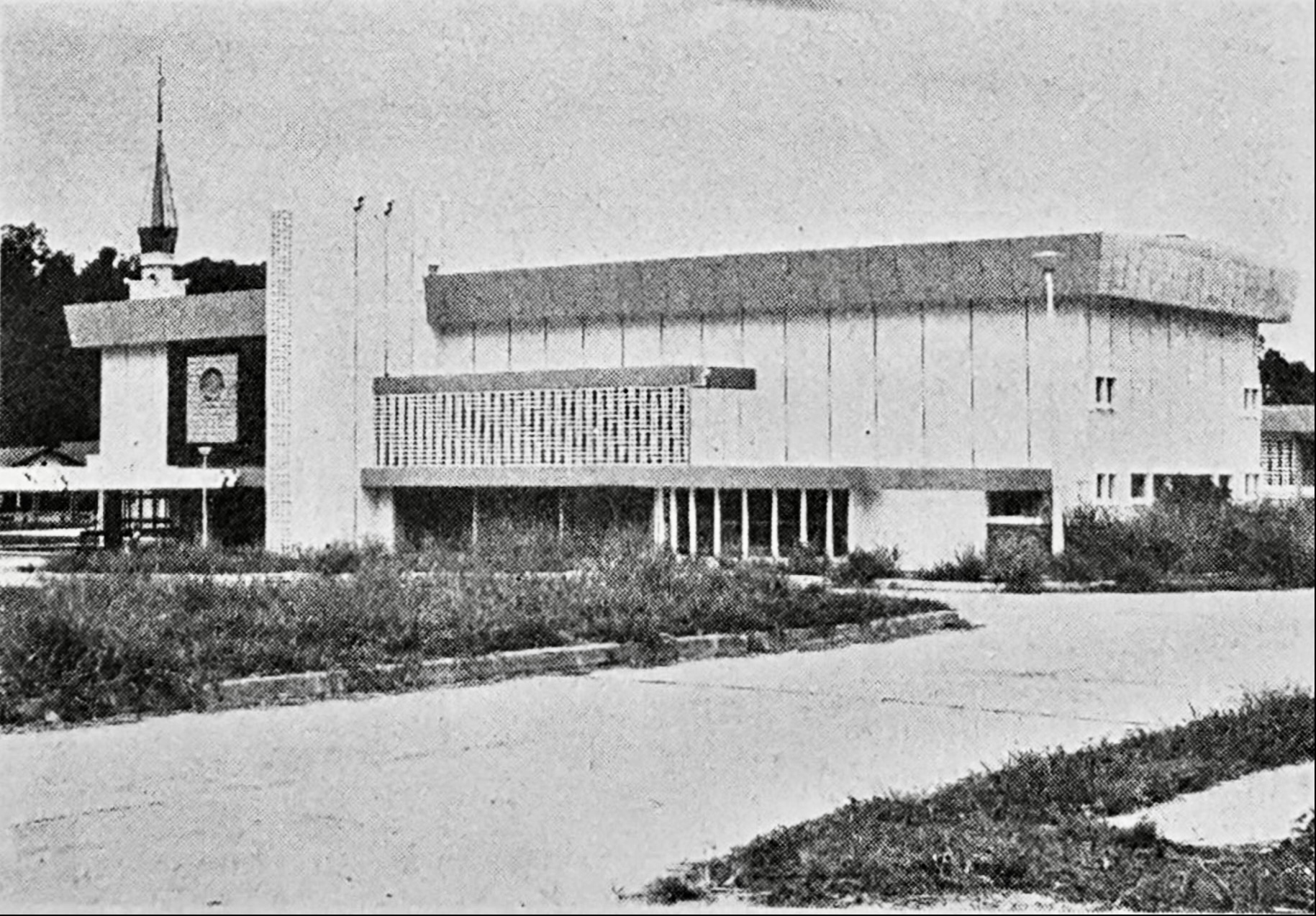
Religious Teachers College in 1971

In order to create an integrated national education policy that would reflect the goals and economic progress of the nation, Brunei formed an entirely new Suruhanjaya Pelajaran, 'Education Commission' in May 1970 following the collapse of the 1962 National Education Policy. The new economic policy and the 1969 National Education Policy, which mandated that Malay be taught in all schools, were two of Malaysia's recent policies that had an impact on the ensuing 1972 National Education Policy. The foundation of Universiti Kebangsaan Malaysia in 1970 with Malay as the teaching language was another result of this change in Malaysia, which was sparked by racial riots and the desire for national unity. Brunei's 1972 strategy aimed to rectify the weaknesses of the preceding policy and bring it into line with these regional changes.

The events in Malaysia on 13 May 1969, had an impact on Brunei when the 1972 National Education Policy came into being. The government's motivation for the formation of the Education Commission appears to have stemmed from Malaysia's racial riots and ensuing policy adjustments, given Brunei's political and socioeconomic stability following the 1962 insurrection and the Education Commission's formation only in 1970. Similar to the 1962 policy, the 1972 policy placed a strong emphasis on a single educational system and Malay as the medium of teaching. However, it also made Islamic education a major subject, indicating a larger regional tendency towards the integration of Islamic ideals in education. This change corresponds with Malaysia's then-heightened understanding of Islamic theology.

Tensions with Malaysia also impeded Brunei's efforts to implement the 1972 National Education Policy. Relations between Brunei and Malaysia were strained at the time due to a number of incidents, including former PRB leaders in Brunei escape through the assistance of Malaysian security personnel, Bruneian students leaving to Malaysia to receive protection, and the Bruneian government's fear of political influence. Brunei required Malaysian assistance with educators, textbooks, and an examination system. The actualisation of the strategy was further complicated when Brunei removed its students from Malaysia, including those who were in the middle of final exams, in response to possible anti-government tendencies.

The 1972 National Education Policy planned to make Malay the default medium of teaching; nevertheless, the departure of Bruneian students from Malaysia posed a major obstacle to its implementation. This action also prevented Malay students from pursuing further education in Malaysia, forcing many of them to drop out of school in forms five or six and find entry-level positions in the government or private sectors. After the 1970s, public demand for a new national education strategy declined as the impact of the 1962 uprising on public trust and political parties' declining power contributed to the decline in public demand. As time went on, more and more educated Bruneians—including women—achieved important positions in government agencies, demonstrating the expanding significance of English in education.

The demand for English education among the Brunei population contributed to the 1972 National Education Policy's failure to set up Malay as the official language of teaching in schools. Since the 1950s, there has been an apparent tendency among parents to prefer sending their kids to English-language schools, whether they were private establishments or overseas ones. By the late 1970s, this preference was more apparent, as demonstrated by the notable decline in the number of students attending Malay secondary school (from 4,487 in 1970 to 1,218 in 1979), while the number of students attending government English secondary school (to 7,344) increased. The change in educational choices was influenced by the government's failure to enforce of the usage of the Malay language in schools as well as the anticipated benefits of bilingual for improved career chances and higher learning.

== 1984 Bilingual Education Policy ==
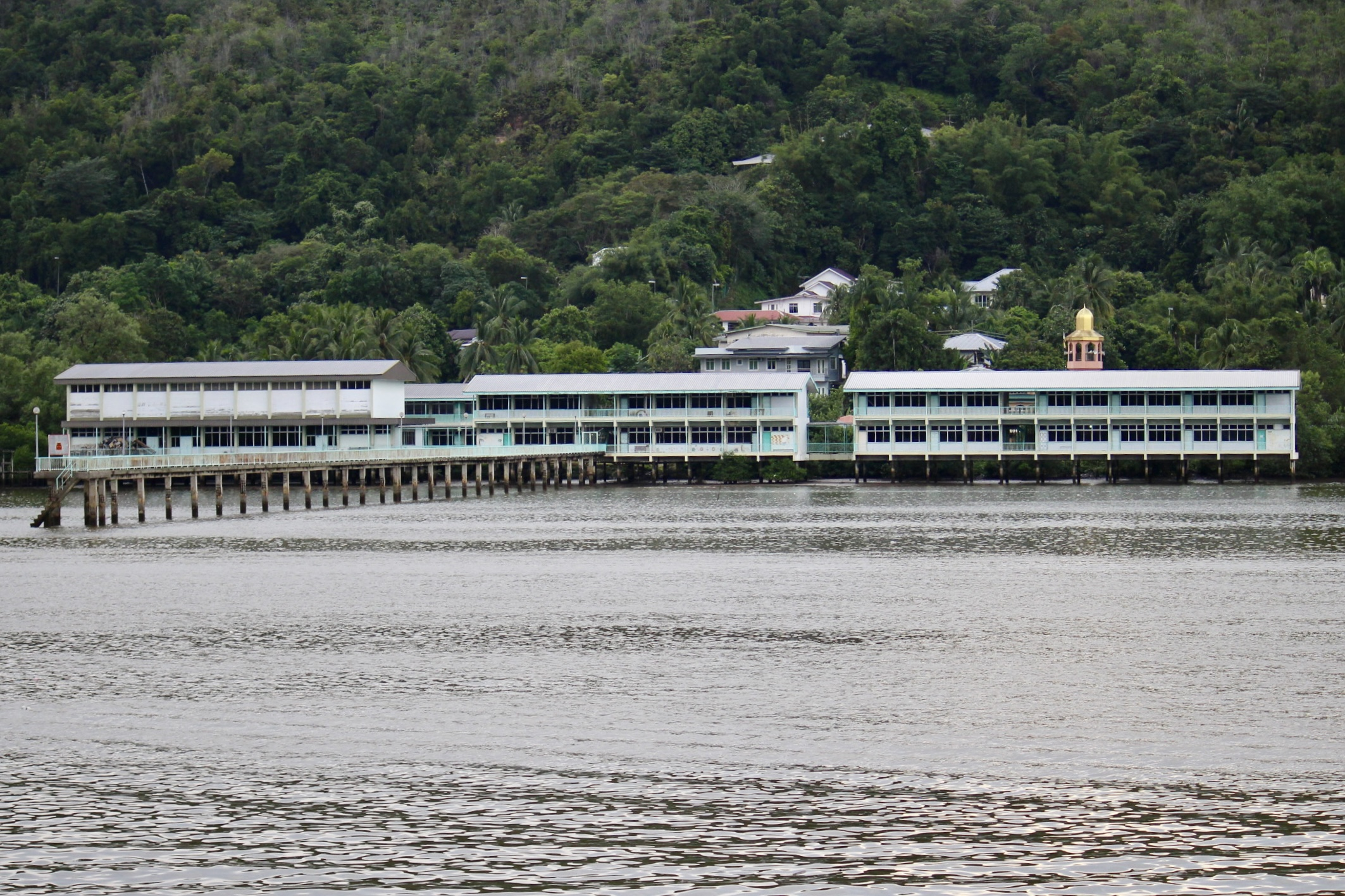
Pelambayan Religious School sits on the river bank of the Brunei River

Following its independence, Brunei became increasingly vocal in its support of bolstering Islamic sovereignty. This included outlawing alcohol and prohibiting its sale, as well as enacting laws pertaining to law enforcement, compulsory religious education, Sharia criminal law, which faced harsh criticism from other nations, and beyond that, introducing the concept of "Negara Zikir," which was directly influenced by Sultan Hassanal Bolkiah.

On 9 April 1984, Brunei unveiled a new education policy called the Dasar Pendidikan Dwibahasa, 'Bilingual Education Policy' in response to the failure of the 1972 National Education Policy. This policy characterised a major change in that English would serve as the main medium of teaching from fourth grade thereafter, while Malay was to be employed for lower grades as well as particular subjects. Other significant components from the 1972 policy were retained, such as the incorporation of Islamic values and the unifying of the curriculum. The goal was to make it easier for Bruneians to pursue further education overseas and to get them ready for the workforce since having fluency in English was considered essential for opportunities both domestically and globally.

Even the teaching of Malay in schools appears to be becoming less commonplace than the usage of English, despite the Bilingual Education Policy being defined as an approach of using and promoting both of the primary languages, namely Malay and English. Actually, Brunei's school system uses English as the primary language of instruction under this policy. As a result, the objective of the Malay language serving as the primary language of instruction in schools was eventually not met. That ends Brunei's education system's strong Malaysian influence. But many Bruneians chose to carry on their education in Malaysia as ties between the two countries developed, particularly after Brunei gained its independence.

In tandem with these changes, the government began integrating the national philosophy of Malay Islamic Monarchy (MIB) into the education system. In October 1984, just months after full independence, 400 teachers underwent specialised training to teach MIB-related content, including Islam, Malay customs, and national values. Then-minister of education Abdul Aziz Umar underlined the importance of embedding MIB across all levels of society, positioning it as a core element of Bruneian identity. By 1985, MIB was formally articulated as a national philosophy for all citizens, regardless of race or religion. The education system was structured around three guiding principles: Islamisation of knowledge, MIB, and bilingualism.

== National Education System for the 21st Century ==
Abdul Rahman Taib oversaw significant reforms in the development and implementation of the 2007–2011 Ministry of Education (MoE) Strategic Plan, most notably introducing the 21st Century Sistem Pendidikan Negara Abad ke-21, 'National Education System for the 21st Century' (SPN21). In 2008, he introduced a mandatory nine-year education plan and a 12-year education programme for all Bruneians and permanent residents, emphasising multiple pathways to higher education and a holistic, character-focused approach to learning. He also oversaw the establishment of Sultan Sharif Ali Islamic University in 2007, restructured the MoE to include a Permanent Secretary and Division for Tertiary Education, upgraded the Sultan Hassanal Bolkiah Institute of Education to a graduate school, and transformed the nursing college into the Institute of Health Sciences. Additionally, he contributed to updating the Teachers Service Scheme to better align with evolving national education goals.

The goal of the SPN21 is to enhance the quality of education by offering curriculum and assessment, a flexible structure that allows for multiple pathways to higher education, and enough infrastructure to support skill development. The roll out is done in phases, with a group of pupils who completed the 2007 Primary School Examination (PSR) starting the in-between or transitional stage in 2008 at the secondary level. SPN21 was fully implemented at the primary level in 2011 after being partially implemented for Year 1 and Year 4 pupils in 2009.

With a completion date of 2015, the SPN21 initiative significantly altered Brunei's educational framework. Its main objective was raising educational standards by using a dynamic, relevant, and well-balanced curriculum that was in line with Wawasan Brunei 2035. Specialised programs including gifted kids' special education and pupils with physical, mental, or learning disabilities' special education were part of the reform.

== Bibliography ==
- Haji Awg Asbol bin Haji Mail (2011). Pembentukan Malaysia: Isu dan Perdebatan (in Malay). Shah Alam: Universiti Teknologi MARA. ISBN 978-967-363-273-2 – via ResearchGate.
- Siddique, Sharon (1985). "Negara Brunei Darussalam: 'A New Nation but an Ancient Country'". Southeast Asian Affairs. Singapore: ISEAS – Yusof Ishak Institute: 99–108. ISSN 0377-5437. JSTOR 27908522.
- Yahya, Masuriyati; Sa'ari, Che Zarrina (2015). "Sistem Pendidikan Negara Abad ke-21, Brunei Darussalam Dalam Melestari Ketamadunan Islam Negara Zikir: Cabaran dan Harapan". Afkar: Jurnal Akidah & Pemikiran Islam (in Malay). 16 (1). Universiti Islam Sultan Sharif Ali – via ResearchGate.
- Zullkiflee A. (2020). Implikasi 25 Tahun Pemerintahan Sultan Ahmad Tajuddin (PhD Universiti Islam Sultan Sharif Ali thesis) (in Malay). pp. 47–57.
