= Girl Guides Association of Brunei Darussalam =

- Logo of PPPBD
- Malay language: Persatuan Pandu Puteri Brunei Darussalam
- Headquarters: Kampong Anggerek Desa, Bandar Seri Begawan BS8674, Brunei
- Coordinates: 4.9326881°N 114.9440118°E
- Founded: 1 January 1951
- Founder: R. C. Bell
- Membership: 815 (2022)
- Chief commissioner: Norazrina Sarbini
- President: Princess Hafizah of Brunei
- Royal patron: Queen Saleha of Brunei
- Affiliation: World Association of Girl Guides and Girl Scouts
- Website www.girlguides.org.bn

The Girl Guides Association of Brunei Darussalam (Malay: Persatuan Pandu Puteri Brunei Darussalam; abbrev: PPPBD) is a non-governmental guiding organisation where all members serve as volunteers. With the motto "Always Ready," it promotes values like trustworthiness, helpfulness, politeness, obedience, thriftiness, and respect for animals and living things. Open to girls and young women of all backgrounds, the association focuses on developing self-respect and leadership skills through community service, teamwork, and identity-building projects. It prepares its members to serve their community, religion, race, and nation through various activities and initiatives.

== History ==
The Girl Guides Association of Brunei Darussalam was established on 1 January 1951 in Kuala Belait by R. C. Bell, the wife of the British Resident at the time, and officially registered in Brunei Town (now Bandar Seri Begawan) in 1953. It is exclusively for girls and women, with Raja Isteri Pengiran Anak Damit serving as the first patron. Initially, the Girl Guide movement was confined to the Belait District, but by 1954, the first Guide company was formed in Brunei Town, expanding the movement to new Guide companies and Brownie packs, reaching a total of 17 Guide companies and six Brownie packs by 1960.

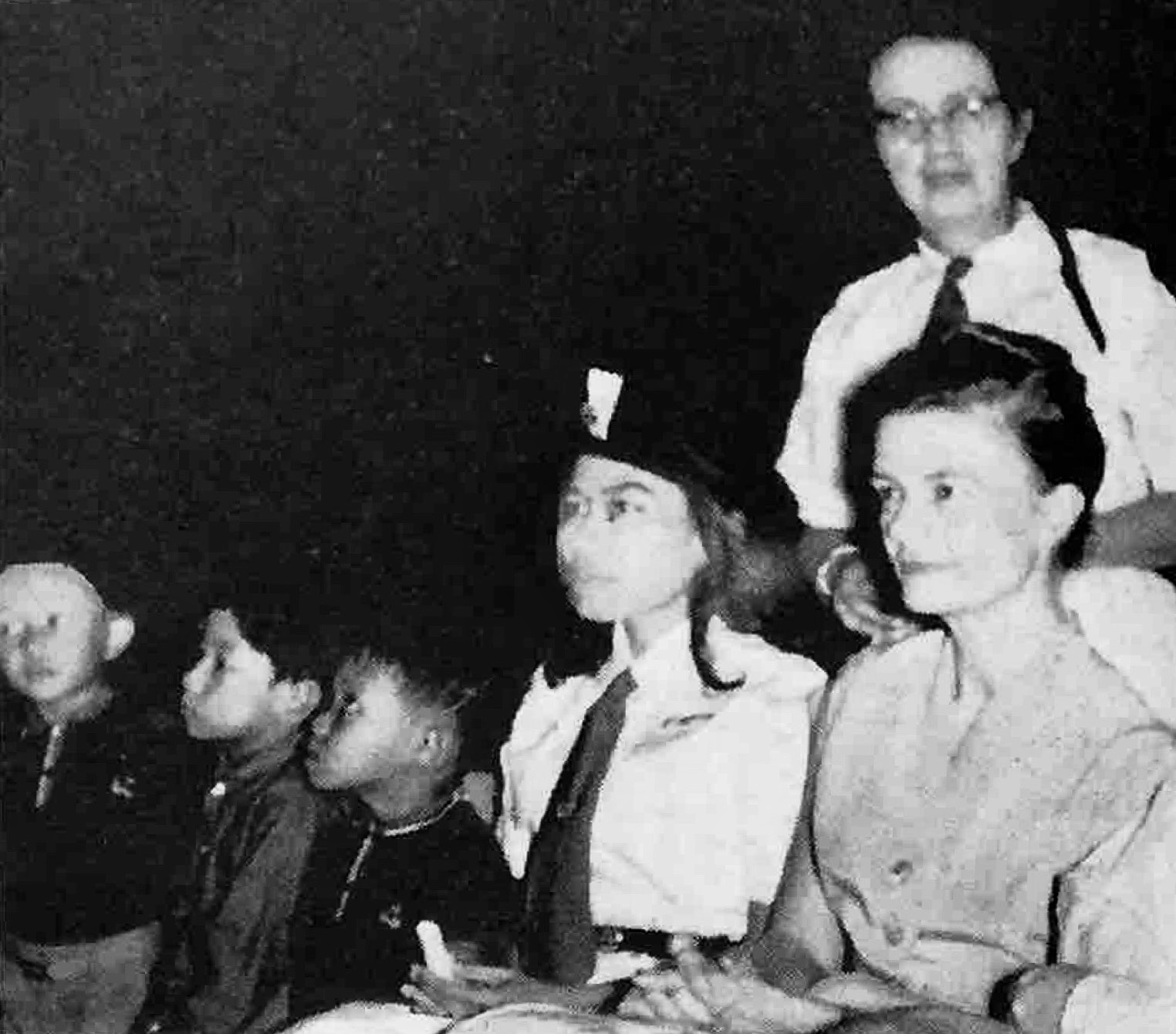
In 1964, Princess Nor Ehsani (fourth from the left) serving as the state commissioner

Following the Brunei revolt in December 1962, practically all guiding operations ceased. Princess Nor Ehsani agreed to serve as state commissioner from 1963 to 1970, and the movement resumed its activities when a British trainer visited. To further promote guiding throughout the nation, the government established the position of organising commissioner in the Department of Education in 1966. This position's duties included setting up Guide companies and Brownie packs in schools. Nine new Brownie packs and fourteen new Guide companies have been established by 1972.

The association nearly came to a complete standstill in 1972 when its president quit. Companies and packs closed, and membership declined. Princess Masna agreed to take over as president in September 1983. She started new programs and activities that gave guiding a new lease of life. A significant membership drive was started, and it was a huge success. Thirteen packs and seven new firms were established by 1986, while the rest resumed operations.

In 1986, the Guide Association signed a Deed of Transfer, granting the Girl Guides Association of Brunei Darussalam self-government in all areas of operation. Brunei gained independence in 1984. The association debuted new uniforms and enrolling badges in 1990. The association became a full member of the World Association of Girl Guides and Girl Scouts (WAGGGS) on 17 July 1996. New patrol badges featuring regional fruits and flowers were issued in 1995. The association commemorated Girl Guiding's 50th anniversary in 2001. Pengiran Anak Saleha awarded certificates of appreciation during the 2006 celebration, which commemorated the association's 55th anniversary of founding. The certificate of gratitude was also given to Princess Nor Ehsani and four other recipients, including Princess Masna, who received Gold Badges for 20 years of Long Service.

== Activities ==
In 2006, The group has expanded its welfare operations and accomplished its goals over the last 55 years by adapting to the demands of the modern world. With 85% of its members being young women, the majority of whom are under 21, it has established itself as a model for other organisations in developing morally upright and responsible people. The association's efforts to build solid relationships with other NGOs and the WAGGGS community were commended by Pengiran Anak Saleha. She also underlined how crucial it is to teach members loyalty and the Girl Guides' principles in order to carry on the association's tradition.

Girl Guides and Brownies have been featured on two sets of postage stamps issued in Brunei. One set celebrates the Guiding movement, while another, commemorating the International Year Against Drug Trafficking and Abuse, features a Brownie and a Girl Guide. The association annually celebrates International Day of Peace on September 21, and in 2018, it marked the 70th anniversary of the Universal Declaration of Human Rights with the theme "The Right to Peace – The Universal Declaration of Human Rights at 70." As part of these celebrations, the PPPBD organises a "Walk for Peace" event, where participants walk from the PPPBD headquarters in Kampong Anggerek Desa to the Hassanal Bolkiah National Stadium and back, promoting awareness of peace and a healthy lifestyle.

== Organisation structure ==
- Royal patron: Pengiran Anak Saleha
- President: Princess Hafizah Sururul Bolkiah
- Chief commissioner: Norazrina Sarbini
- Deputy chief commissioner: Viviyanti Md Ali
- Spiritual commissioner: Fatimah Abdul Ghani
- Legal counsel: Sharifah Aishah Alkaff

== See also ==
- Brunei Darussalam Scouts Association, the national Scouting organisation of Brunei
