= Othman Bidin =

Bruneian educator (born 1913)

Dato Paduka Othman Bidin DPMB
- عثمان بيدين
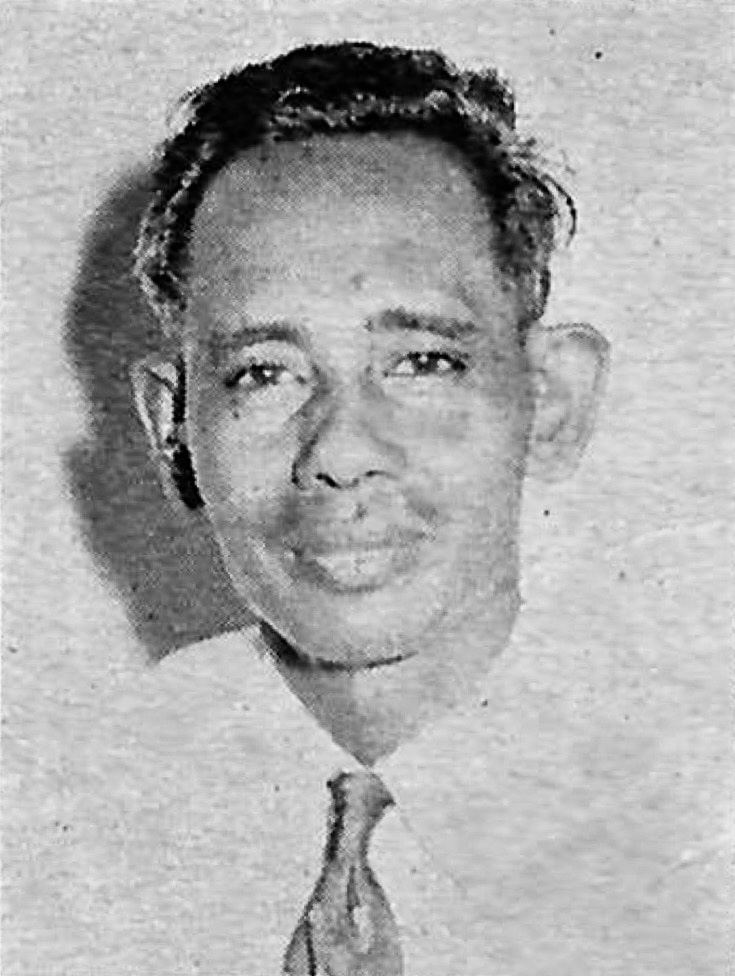
- Othman in c. 1960
- Born: 1913; Kampong Tarap Bau, Brunei–Muara, Brunei
- Education: Jalan Pemancha Malay School; Sultan Idris Training College
- Occupation: Teacher

Othman bin Bidin (born 3 November 1913) was a Bruneian teacher, renowned for being the first local to serve as principal of the Brunei Malay Teachers' College, first principal of the Seri Begawan Religious Teachers College (MPUSB), and member of the Legislative Council in the 1970s. He was a strong advocate for enhancing the role of teachers and played a crucial role in championing their rights and welfare. Alongside other key figures, Othman made significant contributions to the development of Brunei's educational system, particularly through his commitment to improving teaching standards and promoting the value of education in the country.

== Early life and education ==
Othman bin Bidin was born in 1913 in Kampong Tarab Bau, a village located along the Brunei River. His early life and education in this rural setting laid the foundation for his later contributions to the nation's development. From 1931 to 1936, he studied at Sultan Idris Training College, where he became one of its earliest Bruneian alumni, alongside notable figures such as Marsal Maun and Basir Taha.

== Career ==
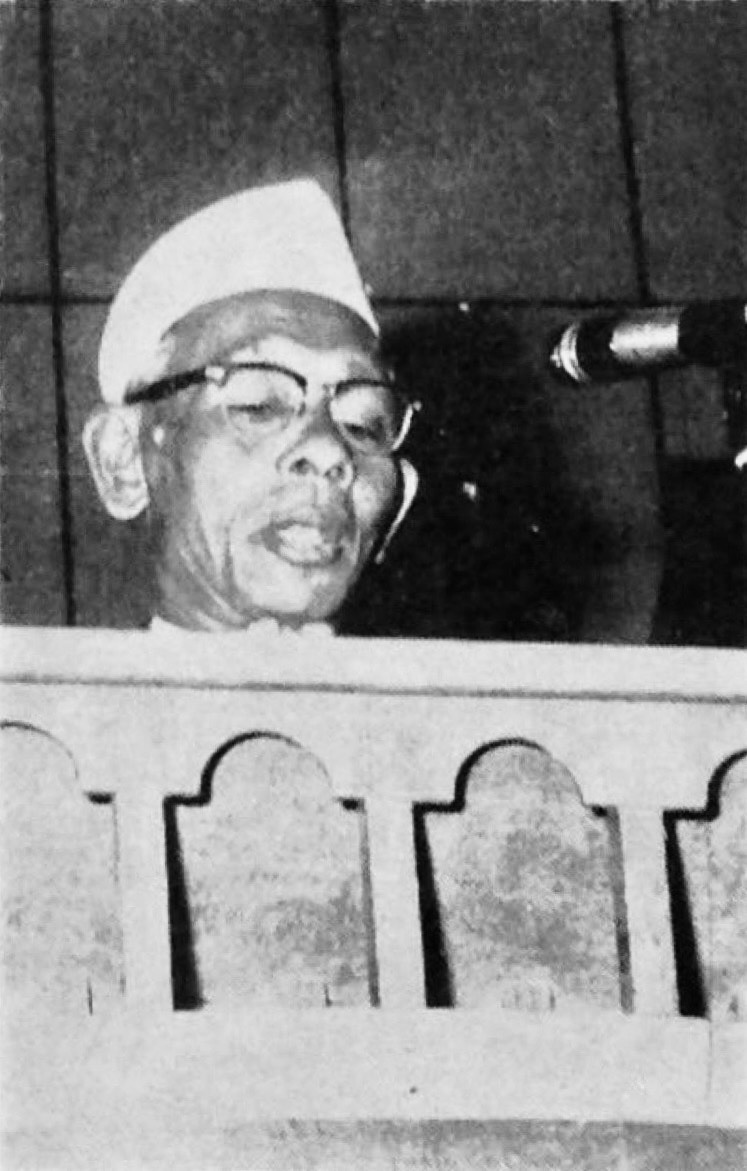
The MPUSB principal, Othman, speaking in 1972

Othman became a respected figure, serving in various roles throughout his career and making a significant impact on education and public service in Brunei, starting his teaching journey at Jalan Pemancha Malay School in Brunei Town. In 1936, 24 scouts from the Brunei Scout Movement (now Brunei Darussalam Scouts Association) were organised in Bukit Bendera, Tutong District, with him serving as their leader. He was involved in the committee overseeing the restructuring of religious education in Brunei by 1940, working alongside notable figures such as Basir Taha, Marsal Maun, and Harun Mohd Amin. This restructuring introduced religious instruction in various schools, aligning the curriculum with those of the Federated Malay States and Straits Settlements.

After World War II ended in 1945, Brunei came under the administration of the British Military Administration (BMA). During this period, Othman, along with Marsal Maun, was suspended from work by the BMA due to accusations of colluding with the Japanese. Meanwhile, two other individuals were also detained for similar allegations. This turbulent time in Brunei's history coincided with the establishment of the Barisan Pemuda (BARIP) on 12 April 1946, which aimed to address the challenges faced by educators and contribute to the rebuilding of the educational system in the post-war context. He actively contributed to the enhancement of religious education in Brunei in 1946, during which, under the leadership of Basir Taha, religious studies were emphasised and incorporated into the curriculum of Malay schools throughout the country.

After more than two decades of teaching in schools, Othman became the first local Bruneian to be appointed principal of the Brunei Malay Teachers' College in 1961, a role he held for about 10 years. During his tenure at the college, he was part of the Brunei delegation that participated in unofficial discussions with the federal government of Malaya in 1962 concerning the formation of Malaysia. Led by Pengiran Pemancha Pengiran Anak Mohamed Alam, the delegation included prominent Bruneian officials and explored various aspects of Malaysia's formation, including potential benefits for Brunei, Brunei's role within the federation, and regional defence against communist threats in Southeast Asia.

Othman was a member of the Emergency Executive Committee (JKD), which temporarily replaced the Executive Council on 20 December 1962, following the establishment of the Emergency Council. The JKD was created in response to the 1962 Brunei revolt led by the Parti Rakyat Brunei and was tasked with assisting in the administration of the country during the turmoil. The committee was allocated B$1 million to provide housing and other facilities for the British Army, which was deployed to suppress the rebellion. The JKD was chaired by Marsal Maun, and included notable members such as Sir Dennis Charles White, alongside Othman Bidin, Newn Ah Foot, Pengiran Abu Bakar bin Pengiran Omar Ali, and W. I. Glass.

From June 1971 to 1975, he served as the first principal of MPUSB. One of his key contributions was the restructuring of the primary education curriculum in Brunei, and he was also a founding member of the Persekutuan Guru-Guru Melayu Brunei (PGGMB). Additionally, Othman authored Ilmu Alam Ringkas Brunei (A Short Geography of Brunei).

Despite no official announcement being made, the Brunei Darussalam Scouts Association website has labeled him as deceased.

== Honours ==
During the commemoration of Teachers' Day in 1991, Sultan Hassanal Bolkiah presented the Tokoh Guru Tua (retired teacher's award) to Othman during the occasion in recognition of his noteworthy achievements to education. He received a letter of gratitude, a B$12,000 cash reward, special medical privileges, and mementos together with another honouree. In addition to was given the honorific of Yang Berhormat, and received the following award for his national accomplishments:

- Order of Seri Paduka Mahkota Brunei Second Class (DPMB) – Dato Paduka
