= Brunei Darussalam Scouts Association =

National Scouting organization of Brunei

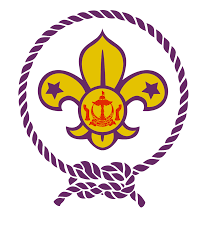
- Malay language: Persekutuan Pengakap Negara Brunei Darussalam
- Headquarters: 4th Floor, Scout Complex, Gadong, BE1718 Bandar Seri Begawan, Brunei
- Coordinates: 4.9003998°N 114.9016318°E
- Founded: 1933
- Founder: Marsal Maun
- Membership: 2,086 (2010)
- Chief commissioner: Haji Junaidi Hussin
- Chief Scout: Al-Muhtadee Billah
- President: ACP [B] Abdul Murad Hj Abdul Hadi
- Royal patron: Sultan Hassanal Bolkiah
- Affiliation: World Organization of the Scout Movement; International Union of Muslim Scouts
- Website bruneiscouts.org.bn

The Brunei Darussalam Scouts Association (Malay: Persekutuan Pengakap Negara Brunei Darussalam; abbrev: PPNBD) is the national Scouting and oldest non-governmental organisation in the country, established in 1933. It became a member of the World Organization of the Scout Movement (WOSM) in 1981. The association celebrate its founding on 1 July each year.

== History ==
In 1933, Marsal Maun, a teacher at Jalan Pemancha Malay School, Brunei Town (now Bandar Seri Begawan), founded PPNBD. At that time, the scout group consisted of only 12 boys. A Sarawak officer, Abang Mohd Zaidi Abang Taha, who was the headmaster and also the education supervisor, served as the leader, while Marsal acted as the assistant leader, marking the beginning of the Scout Movement in Brunei. (Note: From 1933 to 1938, the Brunei Scouts became part of the Scout organisation in Singapore, as Brunei was under the governance of the Singapore's governor.) In 1934, the Bruneian government provided financial assistance to the Pergerakan Pengakap Negeri Brunei (Brunei Scout Movement) with an annual grant of B$150. Scout members were also given free uniforms by the government. In 1936, a group of 24 scouts was formed in Bukit Bendera, Tutong District, under the leadership of the Othman Bidin. By 1940, the movement expanded to Belait District, where Salleh Masri established the first scout team, consisting of 40 members led by Basir Taha. In the mid-1950s, the movement continued to grow in Temburong District, led by Md. Salleh bin Arshad.

From the Scout camp, Brunei scouts strengthened their fourth law, "A Scout is a Brother to All Scouts." In 1939, the Brunei State Scouts were officially registered with The Boy Scout Association in London, enabling them to establish the Brunei Local Association. That same year, the first national Scout camp took place at Kampong Penanjong, organised by Zainal Abidin Ali, with participation limited to scouts from Brunei–Muara and Tutong Districts. The success and enthusiasm from this led to a second Scout camp being held in 1940, this time including scouts from Belait District alongside Brunei–Muara and Tutong participants. In 1958, the Brunei government enacted Act No.13/1958 to formally recognise and protect the activities and interests of the Brunei Scout Movement.

On 30 September 1976, it became an associate member of the Asia-Pacific Scout Region, with the certificate received by its president, Ali Daud, in Tehran, Iran. PPNBD became a full member of the WOSM on 1 July 1981, and was recognised as the 117th member. The acceptance letter was received by Brunei's chief scout, Hussain Yusof, during the World Scout Conference in Dakar, Senegal. PPNBD celebrated a significant milestone in 1981 when Sultan Hassanal Bolkiah kindly agreed to serve as the movement's patron. The sultan paid a visit to Brunei in 1982 to mark the 75th anniversary of the WOSM and to celebrate the national Scout camp.

At Istana Nurul Iman in Bandar Seri Begawan, on 1 November 1993, the sultan once more received the title of honorary patron of the WOSM, which was conferred by Jacques Moreillon, Secretary-General of the World Scout Bureau and WOSM. The scouting movement was later recognised as a member of the International Union of Muslim Scouts (IUMS) at the IUMS conference in Dakar, Senegal, in 1995.

== Organisation structure ==
- Patron: Sultan Haji Hassanal Bolkiah
- Chief scout: Crown Prince Al-Muhtadee Billah
- President: ACP [B] Haji Abdul Murad bin Haji Abdul Hadi
- Vice President I: Pengiran Dr. Haji Mohammed bin Pengiran Damit
- Vice President II: Awang Jurkarnain bin Hussin
- Secretary General: Pengiran Supri bin Pengiran Haji Hashim
- Treasury General: Dayang Rostini binti Hj Suhaili
- Chief commissioner: Skip Haji Junaidi bin Haji Hussin

== Scout headquarters ==
As the original headquarters, the Brunei government granted the PPNBD office in Jalan Sinuai, Kumbang Pasang, Brunei Town. However, from 12 December 1962 until 15 October 1963, security personnel occupied the premises during the Brunei revolt. Building the PPNBD administrative offices in Gadong in January 1971 was one of the association's noteworthy accomplishments. At Kilometer 6, Jalan Gadong, a 10 acres (4.0 ha) block of land was used to build the new headquarters and camping. Prince Mohamed Bolkiah formally inaugurated the structure on 27 February 1971. The construction of a B$22,000,000 multipurpose complex for the Scout Headquarters started in 1997 and was finished in 2000. PPNBD began using the six-story offices in 2001. On 3 July 2005, Sultan Hassanal Bolkiah officially opened the PPNBD Headquarters and Scout Complex in Kampong Beribi.

== Events ==
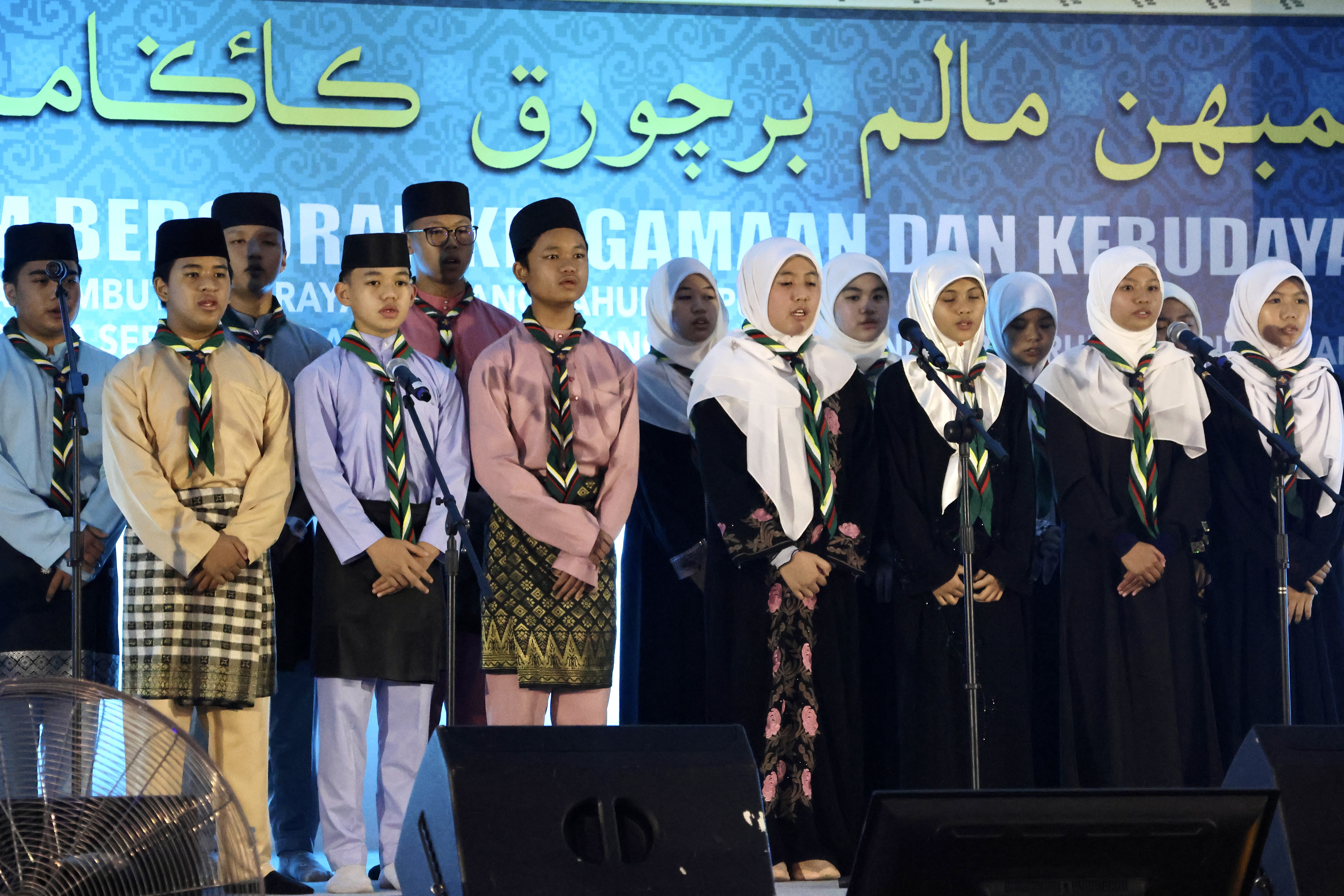
Bruneian scouts performing at a national event in 2023

=== Jamboree ===
PPNBD hosted its first jamboree at the headquarters campground in 1985. The second jamboree was conducted in 1989, when 18 venture scouts were given the Sultan Scout Award and five commissioners and leaders were given the Rakis Medal. Kampong Parit Recreational Park hosted the third Jamboree in 1999. As part of the 'Visit Brunei Year' events, PPNBD took part in the International Youth Camp in 2001, which was organised in Anduki Recreational Park in Belait District in partnership with the Girl Guides Association and the Brunei Darussalam Red Crescent Society.

=== Cubboree ===
The PPNBD is among the several nations preparing for special activities as Cub Scouting celebrates its centennial this year. The 1st Brunei Darussalam Cubboree was held from 15 to 19 June 2008, in conjunction with the 75th year Diamond Jubilee of the PPNBD. More than 600 Cub Scouts participated in the 4th edition in 2016, which also included two observers from Singapore and participants from Malaysia. Participants got the chance to tour the Maritime Museum, Malay Technology Museum, and Royal Regalia Museum in addition to other events.

== See also ==
- Girl Guides Association of Brunei Darussalam
