= Basir Taha =

Bruneian educator (1913–1998)

Dato Paduka Basir Taha DPMB PJK
- بصير تاه
- Basir wearing his Tokoh Guru Tua award in 1993
- Born: 3 November 1913; Kampong Pengiran Pemancha Lama, Kampong Ayer, Brunei
- Died: 25 October 1998 (aged 84); Brunei
- Education: Jalan Pemancha Malay School
- Alma mater: Sultan Idris Training College
- Occupations: Teacher; school inspector; welfare officer
- Political party: BARIP (1946)
- Spouse: Tainun Tundak
- Children: 8; including Abdu'r Rahmani

Basir bin Taha (3 November 1913 – 25 October 1998) was a Bruneian teacher, school inspector, and welfare officer who made significant contributions to education, welfare, and religion in Brunei. He played a key role in shaping the nation's educational system, founding the Brunei Malay Teachers Association (PGGMB) and helping restructure religious education. Basir also revitalised the Scout movement, founded the Kampong Birau Mosque, and contributed to welfare initiatives. As a member of the Kesatuan Melayu Brunei and advisor to then-Prince Omar Ali Saifuddien.

== Early life and education ==
Basir bin Taha was born on 3 November 1913 in Kampong Pengiran Pemancha Lama, Brunei Town (now Bandar Seri Begawan). Basir began his education on 1 July 1921 at Jalan Pemancha Malay School in Brunei Town. Despite the limited resources of the education system at the time, he completed fifth grade, the highest level of schooling then available. After graduating, he joined government service and was appointed as a trainee teacher in 1929. Recognising the importance of English for advancing knowledge, he pursued English studies through special classes for government officers, strongly encouraged by his caretaker, Pengiran Muhammad Salleh.

Between 1934 and 1941, Basir was an active member of the Persatuan Sahabat Pena Brunei (PSPB), a welfare organisation established in the mid-1930s. His efforts in the PSPB were pivotal in fostering youth awareness and instilling nationalism among Bruneians. However, with the outbreak of World War II, the PSPB was disbanded, and its members, including founders Marsal Maun and Basir, shifted their focus to contributing articles to Malayan newspapers like Utusan Melayu and Saudara.

From 1930 to 1935, Basir and Marsal Maun attended Sultan Idris Training College in Perak, Malaya, becoming the first Bruneians sent abroad for education. During his time there, he gained expertise that later benefited Brunei while actively participating in welfare activities such as the national army, fire brigade, and sports. He excelled academically, earning both an education certificate and a sahadah certificate, the highest qualification in Islamic religious studies. Upon returning to Brunei in 1935, he continued his studies in English in Tutong town and took a leadership role in advancing the Brunei Scout Troop in 1936, further contributing to youth development and organisational activities.

== Career ==
Following his training, Basir was tasked with improving Brunei's administrative and educational systems, working alongside Marsal Maun to develop a more structured and organised schooling framework. As a key founding member of the PGGMB, established in 1937, he contributed to enhancing the welfare and professional standing of Malay educators. He, Marsal, Othman Bidin, and Pengiran Muhammad Ali, all graduates of SITC, played instrumental roles in these efforts. By 1936, he was actively involved in revitalising the Scouting movement in Brunei, where his leadership significantly strengthened the organisation. By 1940, the movement had expanded to the Belait District, with Salleh Masri forming its first Scout team of 40 members under Basir's guidance. In 1939, Basir was appointed to teach in Kuala Belait, while Marsal was assigned to Brunei Town. Together, they were pivotal in advancing education in Brunei, particularly following the 1929 education enactment, which extended to the Belait District that same year.

By 1940, under the authority of the British Resident, significant changes were introduced to Brunei's religious education landscape, with schools such as Kuala Belait Malay School, Seria Malay School, and Bukit Bendera Malay School incorporating religious instruction into their curriculum, aligned with the standards of the Federation States and Straits Settlements. Basir played an integral role in overseeing this educational restructuring, collaborating with figures like Harun Mohd Amin, Marsal, Nordin Abdul Latif, and Othman. During the same period, the British government established the Brunei Voluntary Force and the Special Police Force to prepare for the anticipated arrival of the Imperial Japanese Army in Southeast Asia. Basir joined this force, undergoing military training and becoming a strong and capable member. However, after the Japanese conquered Brunei, the force was disbanded. During the Japanese occupation, Basir was offered various important positions by the Japanese government, but he declined, choosing instead to further his education at the "KOYEN KOSEUJU" teacher training centre in Brunei. Additionally, Bruneian students, including Idris Hamzah, Tuah Hitam, Basir, Jamil Al-Sufri, and Marsal, received teacher training under the Japanese administration.

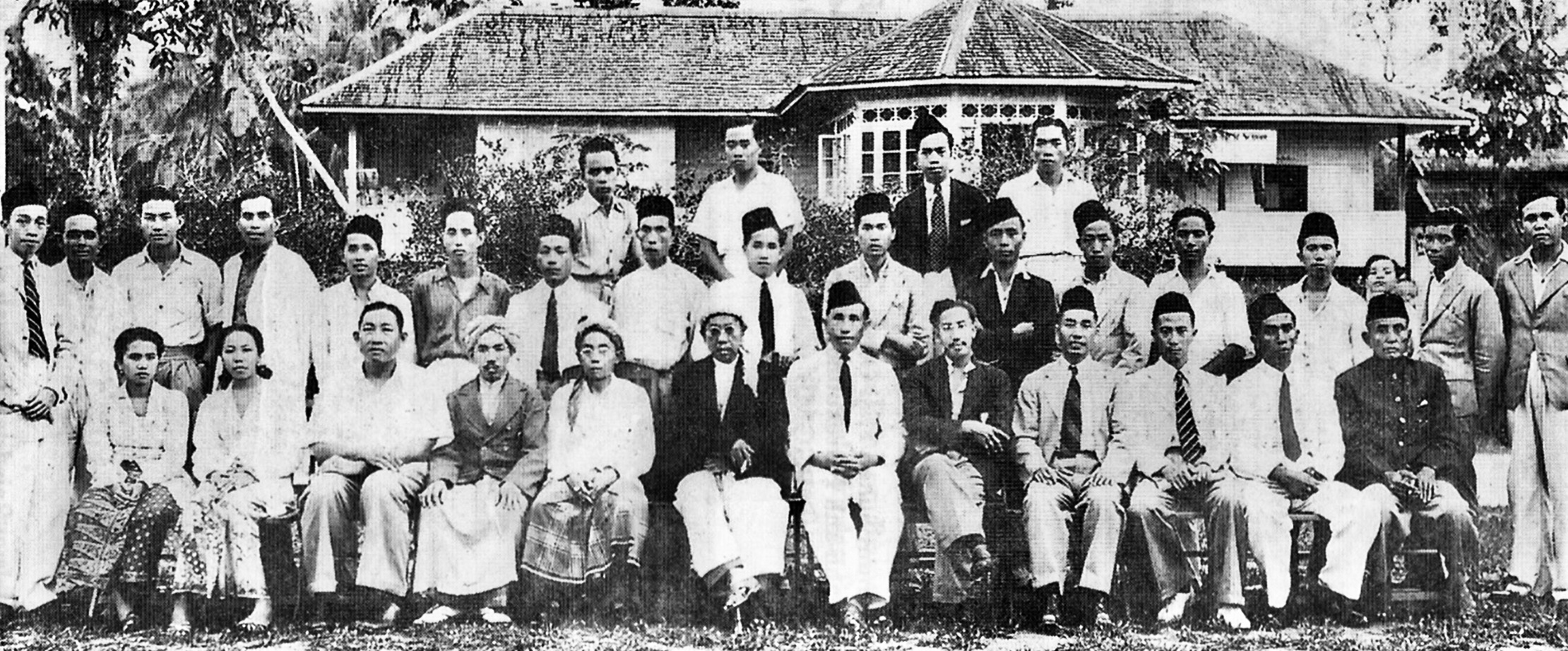
Basir's (seated sixth from the right) retirement ceremony in front of Istana Sugara, attended by Prince Omar Ali Saifuddien and other officials

In 1944, Basir advanced his education at the prestigious 'Kochu Sunsi' and 'Shi Gakko' colleges, renowned teacher training centres for headmasters and inspectors in Brunei Town. After completing a rigorous three-month programme, he and other instructors were assigned to remote locations, including Miri, Labuan, and Limbang. Upon graduating, Basir was appointed chief school inspector for Miri, Labuan, and the fourth and fifth divisions of Sarawak, while also overseeing the coastal borders of Sabah. Alongside his contributions to education, Basir was active in welfare initiatives through Barisan Pemuda (BARIP), an early left-wing political party established after the Japanese occupation of Brunei. In 1946, he joined the Kesatuan Melayu Brunei, led by Prince Omar Ali Saifuddien, and became one of its key driving forces. Two years later, in 1948, he was appointed secretary to the prince, reflecting his growing prominence in Brunei's administrative and social spheres.

In 1955, Basir retired from government service and performed the hajj pilgrimage in the same year. Following his retirement, he settled in Kampong Luagan Timbaran, Tutong District. where he dedicated himself to serving the local communities of Luagan Timbaran and Kampong Birau. To make productive use of his time, he opened a grocery store in Kampong Luagan Timbaran, contributing to the village's daily needs. Additionally, he was appointed as an advisor to the Birau Primary School committee, which had been established in 1954.

Basir was one of the founders of the Kampong Birau Mosque, established in 1963, and was appointed as a voluntary imam alongside Marsal Hassan, under the leadership of Abdul Kadir Talip, a religious teacher. He earned great respect from the villagers due to his authority and extensive knowledge in religion and education. In addition to his work with the mosque, He remained active in welfare activities, including his involvement in the Scout movement and the Red Crescent. He also held significant roles in the PGGMB, serving as both president and secretary general, and was honoured as a Guru Berjasa (Distinguished Teacher) by the association. In 1962, the government of Brunei offered him a position as a welfare officer in the Department of Welfare, Youth, and Sports, which he gladly accepted, as it aligned with his passions and values.

== Death ==
Basir died on Sunday, 25 October 1998.

== Personal life ==
Dato Khamis, mentioned in the appendix of the genealogy of Basir, is a notable figure in his genealogy. It is said that Dato Khamis came to Brunei after a falling out with his family, carrying a heavy heart. His ancestry is believed to trace back to the royal family, with evidence of this reflected in his character, conduct, and the legacy he carried, which embodied the dignified traits of his elders. Due to his resolute nature, the sultan of Brunei at the time honoured him by granting him a tract of land known as 'Pandam' as a residence, as well as acknowledging his connection to the Johor royal family with this tribute.

Basir had eight children with his wife, Datin Hajah Tainun binti Tundak, and the family resided in Kampong Luagan Timbaran. Each of Basir's children has made significant contributions in their respective fields. Pehin Orang Kaya Seri Pahlawan Colonel (Retired) Dato Paduka Haji Abdu'r Rahmani distinguished himself as the commander of the Royal Brunei Land Force from 2003 to 2005, while Pehin Orang Kaya Leila Perkasa Colonel (Retired) Dato Paduka Haji Mahdini is recognised for his aristocratic status as a member of the Manteri social class. Meanwhile, Haji Adnani, Hajah Muraini, Hajah Rehaini, Hajah Rosni, Hajah Hairani, and Husaini are the other children.

== Honours ==
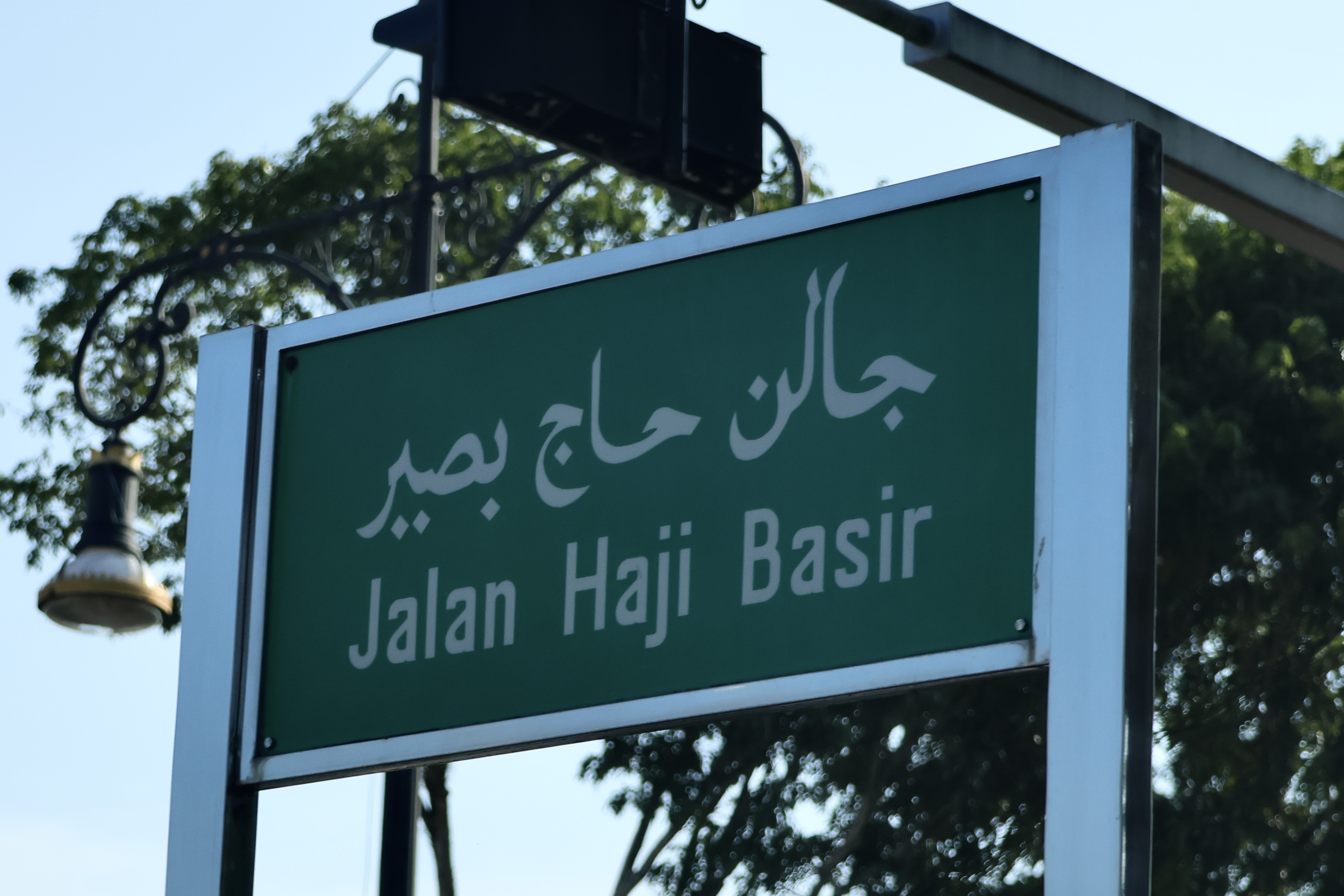
Jalan Haji Basir road sign

In recognition of his service and contribution in the field of education, Sultan Hassanal Bolkiah has allowed a road in Bandar Seri Begawan to be immortalised in his name, Jalan Dato Haji Basir, which is located in Jalan Pusar Ulak, Bandar Seri Begawan. In addition, one of the primary schools has also been named after him, which is Dato Basir Primary School, in Kampong Perpindahan Lambak Kanan. During the commemoration of Teachers' Day on 23 September 1993, Sultan Hassanal Bolkiah presented the Tokoh Guru Tua (retired teacher's award) to 80-year-old Basir during the occasion in recognition of his noteworthy achievements to education. He received a letter of gratitude, a B$12,000 cash reward, special medical privileges, and mementos together with another honouree. In addition to receiving the following award for his national accomplishments:

- Order of Seri Paduka Mahkota Brunei Second Class (DPMB; 1974) – Dato Paduka
- Meritorious Service Medal (PJK; 1966)
- Pacific Star (1953)
- Defence Medal (1953)
