= Kampong Anggerek Desa =

Village and neighbourhood in Brunei

Kampong Anggerek Desa Kampung Anggerek Desa
- Village and neighbourhood
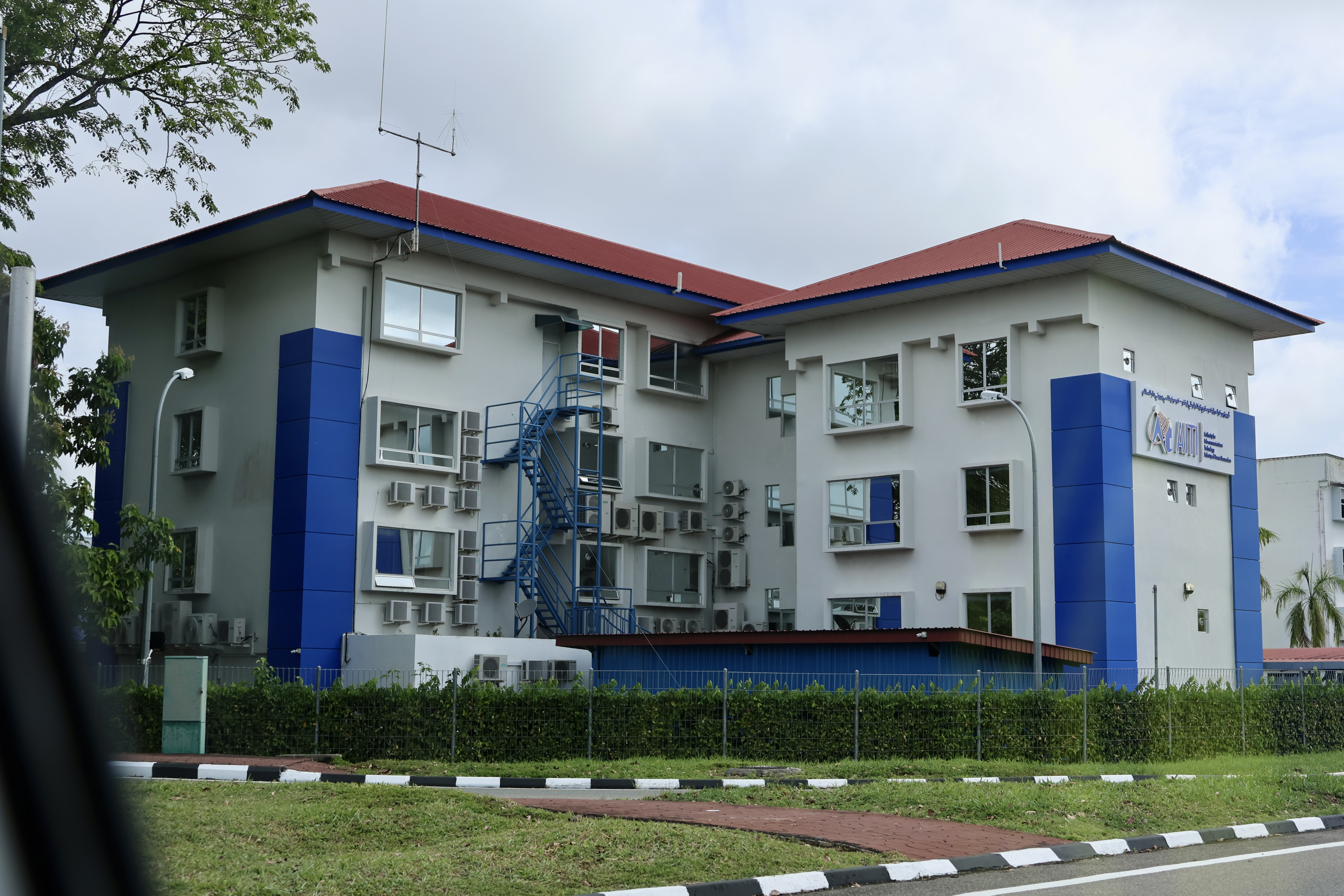
- AITI headquarters

- Location in Brunei
- Coordinates: 4°56′10″N 114°56′48″E
- Country: Brunei
- District: Brunei-Muara
- Mukim: Berakas 'A'

Population (2016)
  - Total: 1,443
- Time zone: UTC+8 (BNT)
- Postcode: BB3713

Kampong Anggerek Desa is a village in Brunei-Muara District, Brunei, as well as a neighbourhood in the capital Bandar Seri Begawan. The population was 1,443 in 2016. It is one of the villages within Mukim Berakas 'A'. The postcode is BB3713.

== Facilities ==
Anggerek Desa Primary School is the village primary school. It also shares grounds with Anggerek Desa Religious School, the village school for the country's Islamic religious primary education.

The village is home to the Girl Guides Association of Brunei Darussalam's headquarters and training centre.
