= Sultan Idris Education University =

Public university in Perak

Coordinates: 3°41′06″N 101°31′30″E

Universiti Pendidikan Sultan Idris
- Sultan Idris Education University (English) اونيۏرسيتي ڤنديديقن سلطان إدريس (Jawi) 苏丹依德理斯教育大学 (Chinese) சுல்தான் இட்ரிஸ் கல்விப் பல்கலைக்கழகம் (Tamil)
- Emblem
- Former names: Sultan Idris Training College; Maktab Perguruan Sultan Idris; Institut Perguruan Sultan Idris
- Motto: Pengetahuan Suluh Budiman
- Motto in English: "Knowledge is the Beacon of Pure Character"
- Type: Public university
- Established: 29 November 1922; 103 years ago
- Affiliations: ACU, AUN, ASAIHL, ATQA-AsTEN
- Chancellor: Tuanku Zara Salim
- Vice-Chancellor: Md Amin Md Taff
- Pro-Chancellors: Zakri Abdul Hamid; Alimuddin Mohd Dom; Ismail Bakar
- Administrative staff: 2,172 (2024)
- Students: 24,716 (2024)
- Undergraduates: 19,683 (2024)
- Postgraduates: 5,033 (2024)
- Location: 35900, Tanjung Malim, Perak, Malaysia
- Campus: 2
- Colours: Blue, yellow, red
- Nickname: Ibu Kandung Suluh Budiman
- Website: www.upsi.edu.my

Sultan Idris Education University (Malay: Universiti Pendidikan Sultan Idris; commonly abbreviated as UPSI; Jawi: اونيۏرسيتي ڤنديديقن سلطان إدريس) is a public university located in Tanjung Malim, Perak, Malaysia. Established in 1922 as a teachers' college, it is one of the oldest continuously operating higher education institutions in the country. Since its founding, graduates of the institution have been referred to as "Anak Kandung Suluh Budiman" (lit. 'Children of the Beacon of Pure Character'), a tradition that continues to this day. The university itself is also known as Ibu Kandung Suluh Budiman (lit. 'Mother of the Beacon of Pure Character').

== History ==
=== Sultan Idris Training College ===
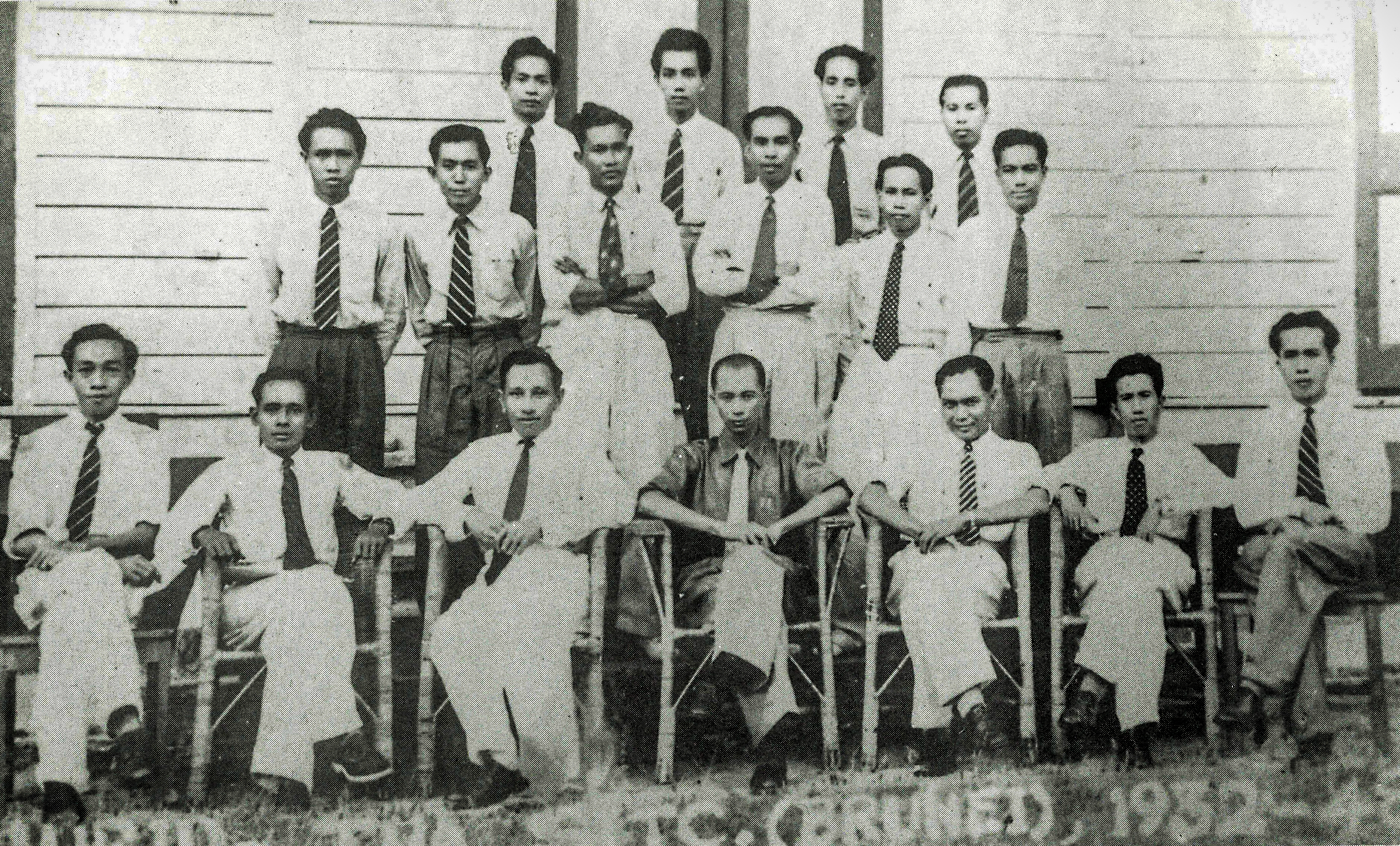
Group photo of Bruneian teachers at SITC taken between 1932 and 1948

Initially, education in the Malay Peninsula was rooted in Islamic religious instruction, focusing on fardu ain and fardu kifayah, and was conducted informally by religious teachers. With the advent of British colonial rule in the 19th century, a secular education system was introduced, aiming to equip the population with basic literacy and practical skills in line with social and economic needs. This system led to the growth of vernacular schools, including those using Malay, Chinese, and Tamil as mediums of instruction, which in turn increased the demand for trained teachers. While foreign teachers initially filled this gap, their numbers became insufficient as the school system expanded. Recognising this issue, the Woolley Report in 1870 recommended the implementation of a professional teacher training system, including a "pupil-teacher" approach to develop local teaching capacity. Despite a cautious British approach towards advancing Malay education, concerns over teacher shortages and the growing need for structured learning eventually highlighted the importance of a formal institution.

Recognising the urgent need for a formal institution to train Malay teachers, the British colonial administration established the Sultan Idris Training College (SITC). Named after Sultan Idris Murshidul Azzam Shah, the 28th Sultan of Perak who ruled from 1889 to 1916, SITC was officially established on 1 November 1922 by Sir George Maxwell, Chief Secretary of the Federated Malay States. The college was initially proposed by Richard Olaf Winstedt, then Director of Education, who aimed to centralise two existing teacher training centres in Malacca and Matang. Winstedt's idea was influenced by his visits to Java and the Philippines, after which he recommended a central training college for Malay teachers with a curriculum encompassing agriculture and practical skills. The establishment of SITC reflected broader British colonial strategies to develop Malay vernacular schools, a policy that gained traction following the 1874 Pangkor Treaty. These schools were designed to promote Malay culture and values, with the goal of ensuring social and political stability under colonial rule. However, resistance from the local Malay population, who feared the erosion of Islamic values, hindered early efforts. This resistance was partially mitigated by the introduction of compulsory school attendance within certain radii in 1902, starting in Malacca, which gradually improved enrolment rates across British Malaya.

The first teacher training centre in Malaya was established in Taiping in 1913 and known as the Matang Teacher Training College. It operated in the residence of Malay noble Ngah Ibrahim until its closure in 1922. That year, the college was relocated to Tanjong Malim and renamed the SITC. Tanjong Malim was chosen for its fertile land, railway and road access, proximity to a river, and a moderate local population. A 64-hectare area was acquired in 1917, and construction of the college, which featured Gothic-style architecture, began in 1919 and was completed by 1922. SITC officially opened on 29 November 1922 with an initial intake of 120 male trainee teachers, many of whom came from the Matang and Malacca teacher training institutions. By March 1924, SITC graduated its first cohort of 58 trained teachers. The college admitted students from across Malaya, including the Straits Settlements, the Federated Malay States, Kedah, Johore, British Borneo, Brunei, and Singapore. By 1931, SITC admitted approximately 130 students annually and retained around 120 of them through to graduation. By 1938, the student population had grown to nearly 400, including 92 Malay girls, a gradual shift towards a more inclusive education policy.

The three-year curriculum at SITC focused on equipping Malay teachers with foundational teaching skills as well as practical knowledge in gardening, elementary agriculture, handicrafts, arts, and physical training. This emphasis aligned with the colonial aim of cultivating a productive and loyal Malay working class and fostering the dissemination of scientific agricultural methods even in rural villages. Under the leadership of its first principal, Oman Theodore Dussek, a British education officer and former headmaster of Malacca College, SITC adopted policies that supported the cultural and intellectual development of the Malay community. Dussek promoted leadership and self-improvement among the Malays and insisted that instruction be conducted in Bahasa Melayu, thereby nurturing a strong sense of pride in Malay language and identity. The academic programme also included subjects such as history, language, and literature, which contributed to an emerging awareness of the Malay world and helped to foster national consciousness.

In 1924, a significant development occurred when the Malay Translation Bureau was transferred from Kuala Lumpur to SITC. Dussek played a key role in facilitating this move and appointed Zainal Abidin Ahmad, known as Za'ba, a renowned Malay linguist and reformer, as head of the Bureau. The Bureau became the intellectual hub of the college, responsible for translating, editing, and publishing educational materials, novels, and government documents. It also trained probationary translators and substantially expanded the college's literary resources. Importantly, the Bureau printed a variety of Malay texts, including some revolutionary literature from the Middle East and Indonesia that had been banned elsewhere. These publications introduced students to new ideas, encouraging discussions that contributed to a growing political awareness among the Malays.

Although SITC was not overtly political, its role in intellectual and educational development during the colonial era was significant. The college became an important centre for learning, producing graduates who would go on to become teachers, writers, and thinkers involved in early discourse on national identity and independence. Individuals such as Abdul Hadi Hassan and Buyong Adil were among those who, inspired by the college's environment, introduced progressive concepts such as the "Malay state" and the "Malay world". SITC's emphasis on the Malay language and literature, combined with the influence of figures like Za'ba and Dussek, contributed to the rise of Malay nationalism. This intellectual and cultural awakening ultimately led to the emergence of political movements, including the Kesatuan Melayu Muda (KMM) in 1938, one of the first left-wing Malay nationalist organisations. Although SITC originated as a colonial institution intended to serve British administrative needs, it evolved into a powerful centre for cultural preservation, educational advancement, and political awakening in British Malaya.

=== Maktab Perguruan Sultan Idris ===
In 1957, following the Education Ordinance based on the Razak Report, SITC was renamed Maktab Perguruan Sultan Idris (MPSI). Administrative leadership transitioned from Europeans to Malay intellectuals during this period. MPSI continued teacher training and became a venue for Malay writers and nationalists. MPSI began admitting female students in 1976, starting with 140 women. The institution maintained its focus on teacher training.

=== Institut Perguruan Sultan Idris ===
On 21 February 1987, MPSI was upgraded to Institut Perguruan Sultan Idris (IPSI), introducing new programmes including special teacher certification and collaborations with Universiti Pertanian Malaysia (now Universiti Putra Malaysia).

=== Universiti Pendidikan Sultan Idris ===
Tuanku Bainun Library

On 1 May 1997, the institution attained university status and was named Universiti Pendidikan Sultan Idris (UPSI), under the Sultan Idris Education University (Incorporation) Order 1997 and Campus Order 1997. At its tenth anniversary in 1997, UPSI had 350 students and six administrative staff, with 29 academic personnel primarily seconded from agencies under the Ministry of Education. The university developed its infrastructure, including the Chancellor's Building in 1999 and the Behrang Ulu Student Residence Complex. By 2001, further facilities such as a gymnasium, library, auditorium, and lecture halls were added or renovated. Initially, UPSI had four faculties offering ten programmes: the Faculty of Languages, Faculty of Social Sciences and Arts, Faculty of Science and Technology, and Faculty of Cognitive Sciences and Human Development. Two additional faculties were established by 2002: the Faculty of Business and Economics and the Faculty of Information Technology and Communication, increasing offerings to 19 undergraduate programmes. Currently, UPSI consists of ten faculties providing 62 academic programmes, including diploma, bachelor's, and graduate degrees. The Graduate Studies Institute (IPS) offers 87 programmes, including master's and doctoral degrees. The Sultan Azlan Shah Campus construction was initiated in 2002, with the main campus renamed Sultan Abdul Jalil Shah Campus. The Sultan Azlan Shah Campus began operations in 2012 and houses several faculties and facilities. Located about 8 km from the main campus, it is situated in Bandar Baru Proton City, near Bandar Proton and the Proton manufacturing plant. The campus was inaugurated in June 2012. In 2021, the Ministry of Higher Education appointed Md Amin Md Taff as Vice-Chancellor. He is the first UPSI alumnus to be appointed as Vice-Chancellor of his own alma mater. In 2022, UPSI celebrated its 100th anniversary, known as the "Centenary Celebration of Four Eras of UPSI". The launching ceremony of the celebration was held on 29 November 2021 and officiated by the Sultan of Perak, Sultan Nazrin Shah. Also present was the Chancellor of UPSI, who is also the queen consort of Perak, Tuanku Zara Salim. The event featured an exhibition showcasing the history and achievements of UPSI, as well as the official launch of the celebration's opening ceremony. In the same year, UPSI emerged as Malaysia's leading education university with international recognition, ranking eighth best in the country and 801st globally by Times Higher Education. The highlight of the centenary celebration took place in 2022 and was officiated by the King of Malaysia, Al-Sultan Abdullah Ri'ayatuddin Al-Mustafa Billah Shah. Throughout the year, a total of 100 programmes were organised covering various clusters, including educational history and technology, culture and spirituality, leadership, research and innovation, entrepreneurship, internationalisation, community, and alumni. Among the initiatives were the production of exclusive memorabilia such as the UG (Universiti Guru; lit. 'Teacher's University') vehicle registration plates, commemorative stamps, and special edition coins. UPSI worked to preserve its historical and cultural heritage by maintaining 26 buildings that are over a hundred years old. One of the most notable is Bangunan Suluh Budiman which was built in 1922 and now houses the National Education Museum. The museum displays a range of items related to education in the pre-independence era, including typewriters, school uniforms, and books. Other heritage buildings include Tadahan Utara, Tadahan Selatan, Rumah Za'ba, the Principal's Residence, the Guest House, and the Dining Hall. In addition to its heritage efforts, UPSI has developed attractions that support cultural, historical, and educational tourism. Both of its campuses, located near the Titiwangsa Mountains, are open to visitors. People can explore the campuses through guided tours or virtual experiences via the UPSI 360 Dynamic VR Tour. Facilities on-site also include a bowling centre, an adventure park, and a glamping area.

== Campus ==
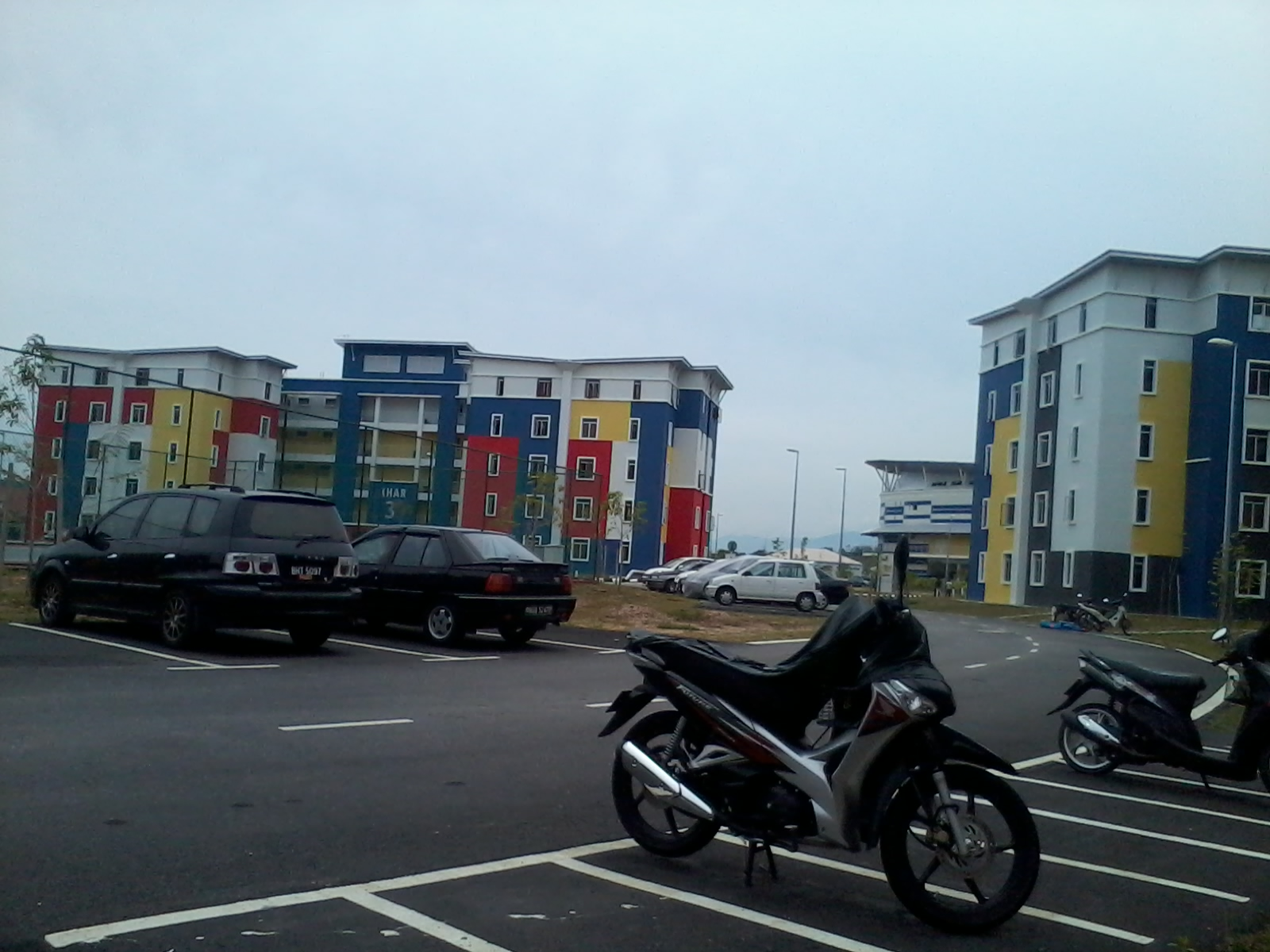
Sultan Azlan Shah Campus

Sultan Abdul Jalil Campus entrance.

Sultan Abdul Jalil Campus interior.

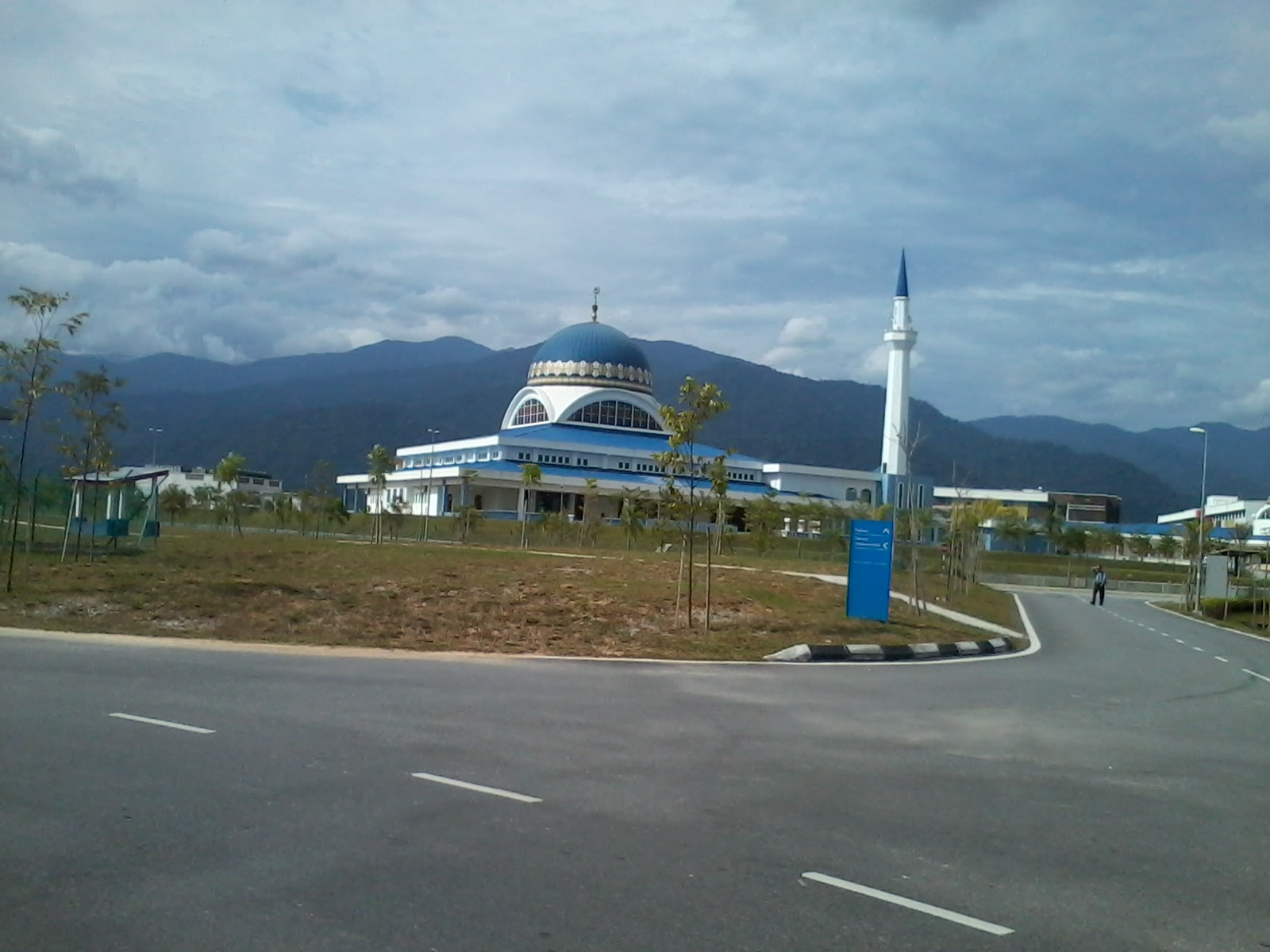
Al-Mursyidin Mosque

UPSI has two campuses, the Sultan Abdul Jalil Shah Campus (KSAJS) and the Sultan Azlan Shah Campus (KSAS). The main campus is on a 300-acre site in the town of Tanjung Malim that straddles both the Perak and Selangor state border. A new campus is on an 800-acre (3.2 km^{2}) site in the new township of Proton City, 5 kilometres from the current campus.

== Incidents ==
=== 2022 bus crash ===
On 9 November 2022, a UPSI bus carrying 55 students skidded and overturned on Jalan Slim Lama, Tanjong Malim. The bus was traveling from the Sultan Abdul Jalil Shah Campus to the Sultan Azlan Shah Campus in Proton City when a burst tire caused the 63-year-old driver to lose control. The bus veered into a ditch on the left side of the road after the Kota Malim Prima junction. 17 students sustained minor injuries and were treated at Slim River Hospital. No deaths were reported.

=== Nur Farah Kartini Abdullah's murder case ===
Nur Farah Kartini Abdullah, 25, a UPSI graduate from Miri, Sarawak, held a Bachelor's degree in Education, majoring in Multimedia. She was working in digital marketing at a printing shop in Perak and reported missing after she was last seen on 10 July 2024 at around 8:00 a.m. in Taman Universiti, Tanjong Malim, while delivering a rental car to a female customer. After the delivery, she was seen getting into a red car with an unknown registration number. When attempts to contact her failed, a police report was lodged in the early morning of 11 July. Few days later, her body was discovered in an oil palm plantation in Kampung Sri Kledang, Felda Gedangsa, Hulu Selangor. The victim was confirmed to have been murdered by someone known to her — a 26-year-old police officer with the rank of lance corporal, who was also her boyfriend. He was arrested and remanded beginning 16 July. During the investigation, various pieces of evidence, including the victim's mobile phone, car keys, and handbag, were recovered from separate locations such as Sungai Trolak, Slim River and a garden linked to the suspect. DNA testing confirmed the identity of the victim and her remains were buried in Pekan, Pahang. The suspect was brought to the Kuala Kubu Bharu Magistrate's Court and charged with murder under Section 302 of the Penal Code. The case garnered significant public attention and even received the attention of King Al-Sultan Abdullah Ri'ayatuddin Al-Mustafa Billah Shah who extended a donation to the victim's family.

=== 2025 bus crash ===
On 9 June 2025, a privately chartered bus carrying 42 students from UPSI collided with a Perodua Alza MPV on a dark, downhill and winding stretch of the East–West Highway near Gerik, Perak, at 1:10 am, killing 15 and injuring 31 in Malaysia's deadliest road accident in over 10 years. Operated by Syarikat Kenari Utara and registered in Kedah, the bus was en route from Jerteh, Terengganu, to the university's campus in Tanjong Malim after the Eid al-Adha holiday break. Dashcam footage showed the bus speeding and attempting to overtake before hitting the minivan and road railings, then flipping, though it did not plunge into a ravine. Most victims were thrown into a ditch and survivors crawled out. The bus driver and attendant were among the 44 on board, while the four minivan occupants sustained less severe injuries. Firefighters had to cut open the rear of the bus to retrieve victims. Many extended condolences, including King Sultan Ibrahim, Sultan of Perak Nazrin Shah, and Prime Minister Anwar Ibrahim, while the Higher Education Ministry provided support services. A task force, including the Royal Malaysia Police and transport safety agencies, was formed to investigate, with early findings indicating the bus overturned after hitting the minivan. Survivors reported that the bus was speeding and had emitted a burning smell.

== Notable alumni ==
- Abdul Ghafar Baba (1925–2006), former Deputy Prime Minister of Malaysia
- Abdul Rahman Abbas (born 1938), former Yang di-Pertua Negeri of Penang
- Abdul Rahman Talib (1916–1968), former Minister of Education of Malaysia
- Adam Adli (born 1989), Deputy Minister of Youth and Sports of Malaysia
- Amir Ahnaf (born 2000), Malaysian actor and model
- Basir Taha (1913–1998), Bruneian educator and youth advocate
- Buyong Adil (1907–1976), Malaysian historian, writer and educator
- Husain Yusof (1918–2010), Bruneian educator
- Ibrahim Yaacob (1911–1979), founder of Kesatuan Melayu Muda
- Jamil Al-Sufri (1921–2021), former principal of the Brunei History Centre
- Khairudin Abu Hanipah
- Mohamad Yusri Bakir (born 1971), current Member of the Perak State Legislative Assembly for Ayer Kuning
- Marsal Maun (1913–2000), former Menteri Besar of Brunei and founder of Brunei Scout Movement
- Muslimin Yahaya (born 1967), current MP for Sungai Besar
- Othman Bidin (born 1913), Bruneian educator and former legislative councillor
- Pengiran Abdul Momin Othman (1923–2006), former ambassador of Brunei to Indonesia
- Pengiran Muhammad Ali (1916–2005), former Deputy Menteri Besar of Brunei
- Pengiran Muhammad Yusuf (1923–2016), former Menteri Besar of Brunei and writer of the country's national anthem
- Salleh Masri (1919–1996), founder of Brunei People's Party
- Senu Abdul Rahman (1919–1995), former Member of the Malaysian Parliament for Kuala Kedah and Kubang Pasu Barat
- Sidek Saniff (born 1938), Singaporean politician and activist
- Suratman Markasan (1930–2024), Singaporean poet, novelist and literary pioneer
- Syed Nasir Ismail (1921–1982), former Speaker of the Dewan Rakyat of Malaysia
- Zainal Abidin Ahmad (1895–1973), Malaysian academician and grammarian

== See also ==
- List of universities in Malaysia
