= Arthur Sleep =

British colonial administrator (1894–1959)

Arthur Sleep CMG

British Adviser to Johore
- In office 1948–1949
- Preceded by: Eric Ernest Falk Pretty
- Succeeded by: John Falconer

Resident Commissioner of Pahang
- In office 1946–1947
- Preceded by: John Allen Harvey
- Succeeded by: Wilfred Charles Steuart Corry

Personal details
- Born: 12 May 1894
- Died: 11 December 1959 (aged 65) Parkstone, Dorset
- Children: 1
- Education: University of Manchester
- Occupation: Colonial administrator

Arthur Sleep (12 May 1894 – 11 December 1959) was a British colonial administrator who served as British Adviser to Johore from 1948 to 1949.

== Early life and education ==
Sleep was born on 12 May 1894, the son of John Sleep of Dalton-in-Furness. He was educated at Ulverston Grammar School and University of Manchester where he received his BSc. He served in the First World War in France with the Royal Flying Corps and King's Own Regiment, and rose to the rank of captain.

== Career ==
Sleep joined the Malayan Civil Service in 1920, and served in various posts including in succession: assistant at the Land Office, Kota Bahru (1920); assistant District Officer, Teluk Anson (1925); assistant District Officer, Parit (1925); District Officer, Kuala Selangor (1926); Director of Public Prosecutions, Perak; assistant Secretary to Government of the Federated Malay States (1931); assistant Treasurer, Federated Malay States, and member of the State Council, Selangor (1934).

In 1938, Sleep was appointed Deputy Financial Secretary of the Federated Malay States, and in the following year served as Financial Commissioner and Auditor-General of Johore and presented the annual budget to the state council. In 1940, he served as president of the commission established to consider the extension of state hospital facilities to rubber estates. In 1941, he was acting Financial Secretary of the Straits Settlements, and a member of the Legislative Council. In 1942, on the fall of Singapore, he was interned with his wife in Sime Road prison camp.

In 1946, Sleep served as Resident Commissioner of Pahang, and from 1948 to 1949 served as British Adviser to Johore. In his farewell speech on his retirement in 1949, he told the Johore State Council that the Johore government had a special responsibility to ensure the success of the constitutional arrangements of the Federation of Malaya because it was from Johore that the idea for a Federation of Malaya first emerged.

After retiring from the Malay Civil Service, Sleep went to Africa and served as Controller of Finance and Accounts in the British Administration in Eritrea from 1950 to 1952.

== Personal life and death ==
Sleep married Constance Bell in 1918 and they had a son. Sleep was a keen reservist who served for many years in the Malayan Volunteer Infantry with the rank of second lieutenant.

Sleep died on 11 December 1959 at Parkstone, Dorset, aged 65.

== Honours ==
Sleep was appointed Companion of the Order of St Michael and St George (CMG) in the 1949 New Year Honours.
