= Robert Aikman =

British colonial administrator (1905–1962)

Robert Aikman CMG
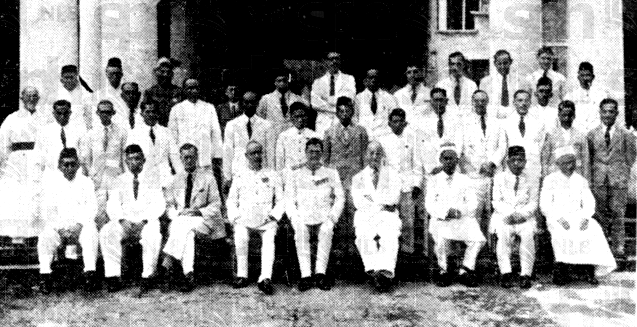
- First meeting of the Council Negri of Sarawak in 1946 after the cession of Sarawak as a British Crown Colony. Aikman is seated 4th from right.

Chief Secretary of Sarawak
- In office 1950–1955
- Preceded by: John Barcroft
- Succeeded by: Bryan Audley Hepburn

Personal details
- Born: 28 August 1905
- Died: 20 April 1962 (aged 56)
- Children: 2
- Education: University of Bristol
- Occupation: Colonial administrator

Robert Gordon Aikman CMG (28 August 1905 – 20 April 1962) was a British colonial administrator. He served as Chief Secretary of the Crown Colony of Sarawak from 1950 to 1955.

== Early life and education ==
Aikman was born on 28 August 1905, the son of Matthew Aikman, a physician from Devon, and Mary Aikman. He was educated at Cheltenham College and the University of Bristol.

== Career ==
Aikman joined the Sarawak Civil Service as a cadet in 1926. He served in a variety of administrative posts including in the Department of Trade and Customs; acting district officer, Bintulu, 1929; assistant district officer, Kapit in 1931, and in Bau in 1932; and resident of the Third Division in 1939. In 1941, he was appointed a member of the newly formed Supreme Council, and in 1946, a member of the Council Negri. During the Second World War he was interned during the Japanese occupation.

In 1947, Aikman was appointed Deputy Chief Secretary of Sarawak, and during that year acted as temporary Governor in the absence of Charles Arden-Clarke. In 1950, he was promoted to Chief Secretary, and on occasion also served as Officer Administering the Government. While in office, "Aikman played a particularly important part during the period of readjustment after Cession when his tact and wise advice were of the greatest value to the new Colonial Service Administration." With Britain promising self governance, he proposed an 18-month timetable as a way of showing resolve on the part of the British government, and sought to improve representation in the Council Negri by requiring that unofficial members, nominated by the Supreme Council, be elected by local councils. Aikman remained in the post until 1955, when he retired from the service due to ill health.

== Personal life and death ==
Aikman married, Australian born, Eaditha Sheila McClelland in 1940, and they had a son and a daughter.

Aikman died on 20 April 1962, aged 56.

== Honours ==
Aikman was appointed Companion of the Order of St Michael and St George (CMG) in the 1951 Birthday Honours.
