= Seria oil field =

Onshore oil field in Brunei

Seria
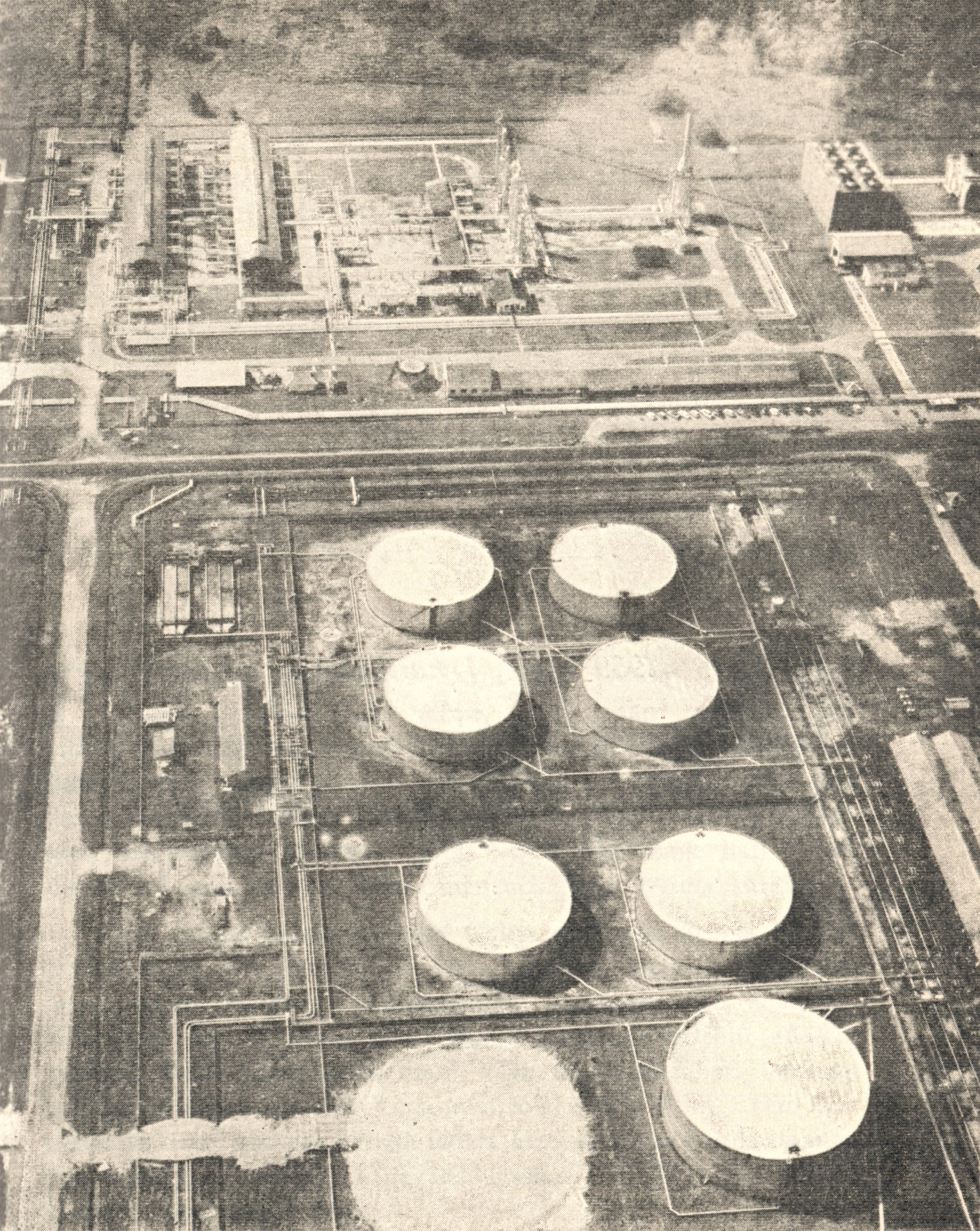
- Oil installations, c. 1967

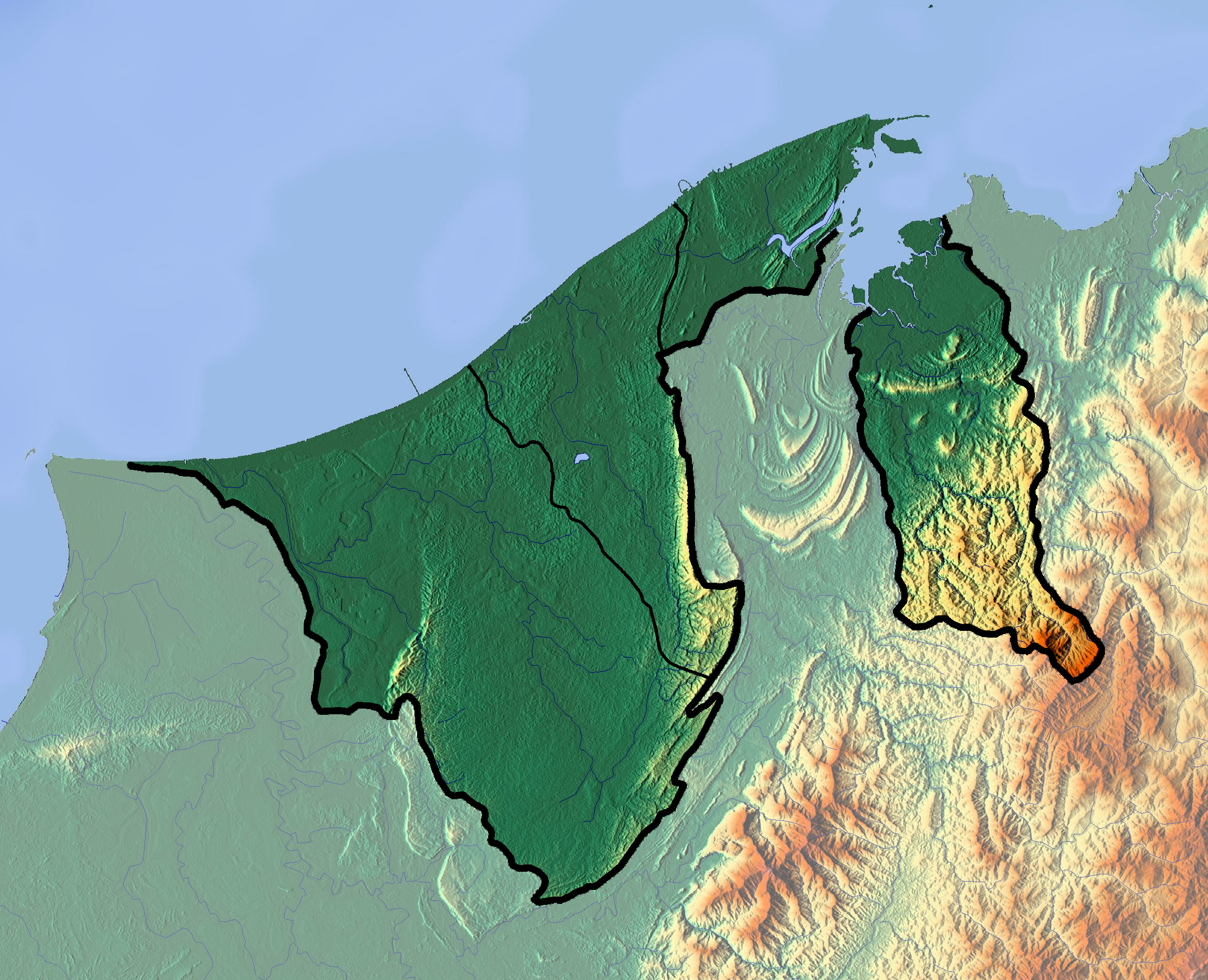
- Location within Brunei
- Country: Brunei
- Region: Belait
- Location: Seria
- Offshore/onshore: Onshore
- Coordinates: 4.6194634°N 114.3409785°E
- Operator: Brunei Shell Petroleum
- Owner: Brunei Shell Petroleum (50%); Government of Brunei (50%)

Field history
- Start of production: 1929
- Peak of production: 1956

Production
- Current production of oil: 20,000 barrels per day (~10.0×10^{5} t/a)
- Peak of production (oil): 115,000 barrels per day (~5.73×10^{6} t/a)
- Producing formations: Upper Miocene

Seria oil field (Malay: Padang minyak Seria) is the largest oil field in northwest Borneo. It was discovered in 1929, with oil found in Upper Miocene sandstone trapped within the Seria anticline, which straddles the present-day coastline. The field has produced over one billion barrels of oil and has remained active for more than 75 years. Brunei Shell Petroleum (BSP) operates the field.

A pivotal moment in Brunei's economic development occurred with the discovery of oil in Seria in the late 1920s, which also played a significant role in ushering in modernity. This initial discovery was followed by further finds of natural gas, leading to continued prosperity. The discovery of oil and gas not only transformed Brunei's political, economic, and cultural landscape, but also led to constitutional changes in 1959, ending the British Resident system and paving the way towards independence.

== History ==
Exploration of the Seria oil field began in late 1926, when F. F. Marriot, a field superintendent with the British Malayan Petroleum Company (BMPC), which is now known as BSP, and Thomas George Frederick Cochrane, general manager of Sarawak Oilfields, detected the smell of "oil" (hydrogen sulfide) in the Kuala Belait area. They subsequently commissioned Straub, a Swiss geophysicist, to carry out a geophysical survey of the region.

On 12 July 1928, the first oil well in Seria was commemorated with a celebratory event officiated by the wife of the British Resident, Patrick McKerron. Designated S-1, the well was drilled using the cable-tool method and was located on the Seria coastline. It reached a depth of 978 feet (298 m) and produced 760 cubic metres (27,000 cu ft) of gas. On 5 April 1929, oil began flowing from the S-1 well, marking a turning point in Brunei’s economic history. During its brief period of operation, which ended on 30 June 1929, S-1 produced a total of 5,320 barrels of oil.

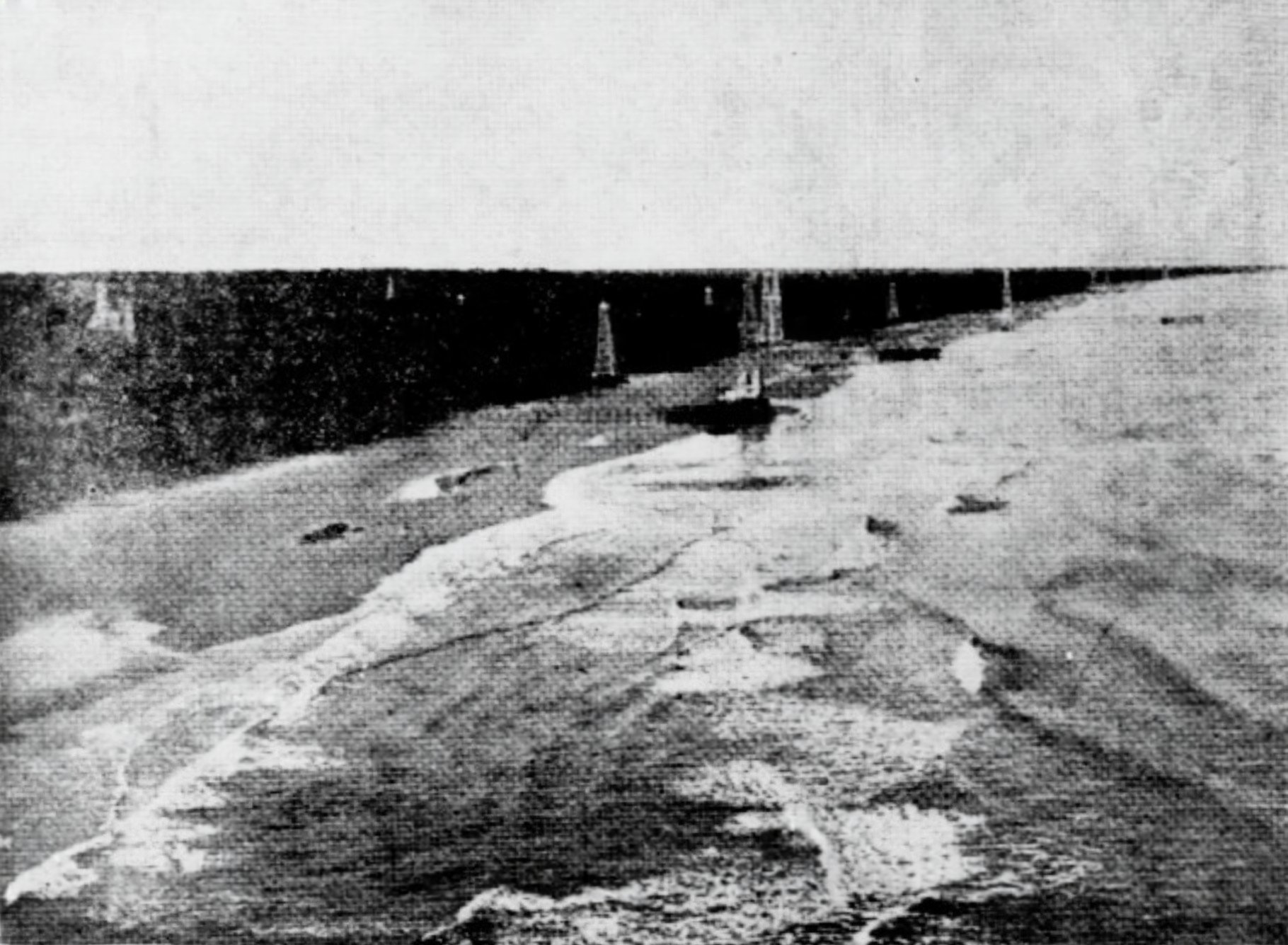
Oil wells lining the Seria coastline, c. 1938

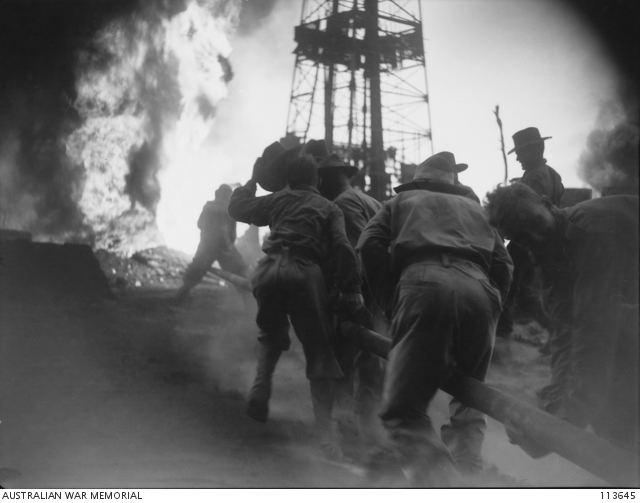
Australian soldiers trying to extinguish an oil well fire in 1945

By 1935, a total of 36 oil wells had been completed in the Seria field, and this number rose to 53 by 1936. That same year, construction began on drilling platforms offshore from Seria, marking the field's early expansion into marine-based operations. By the time of the Japanese invasion, the field was already producing 17,000 barrels of oil per day. At the end of the World War II, the withdrawing Japanese set fire to 14 of the 21 wells in the Seria field. Australian soldiers stopped the flow of the wells to control the fires. Significant development of th oil field resumed after 1945, following the recapture of Brunei by Australian forces.

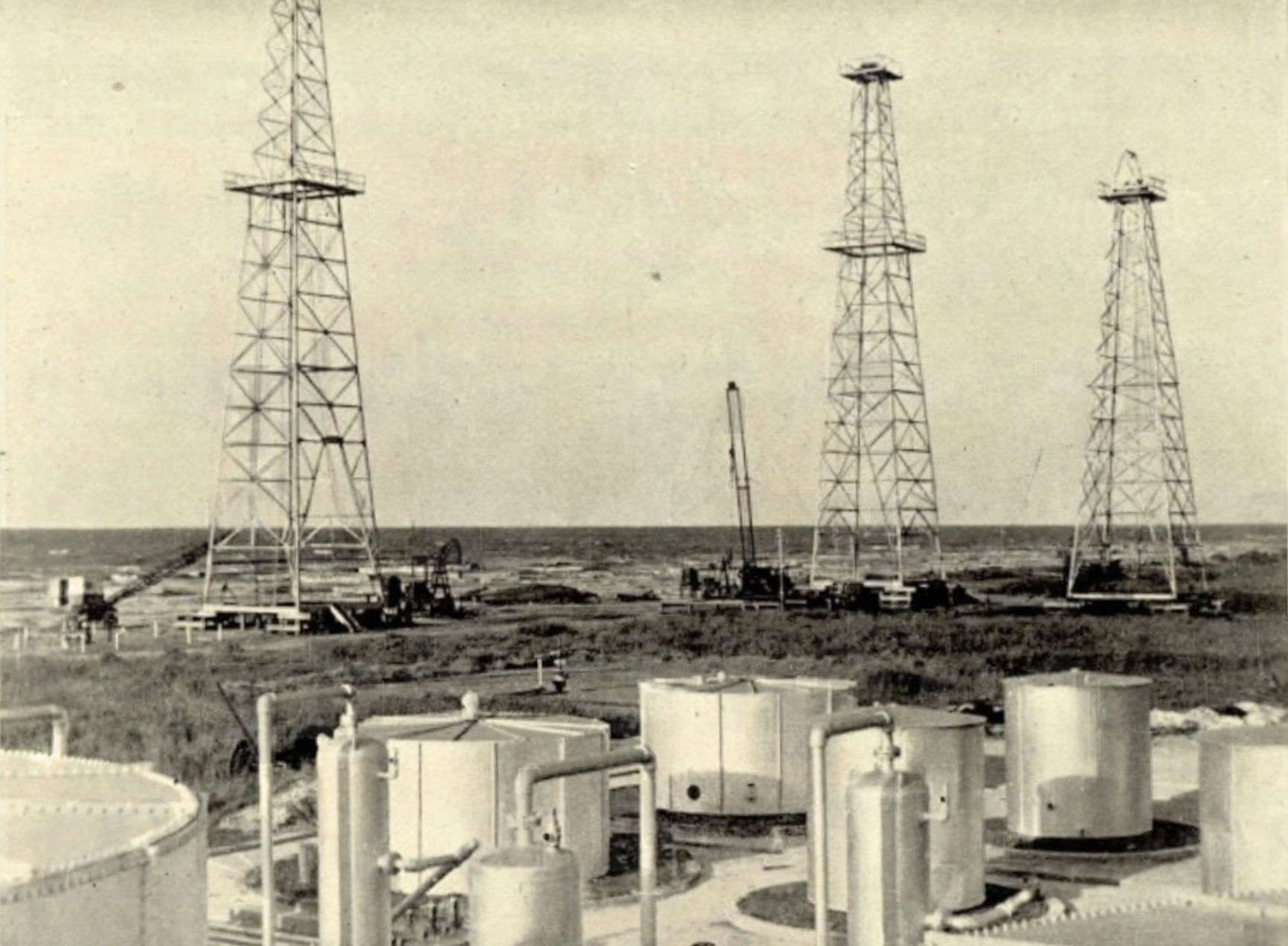
Oil installations, c. 1952

By the early 1950s, nodding donkeys were introduced to the oil field, marking a new phase in mechanised oil extraction. By 1 January 1952, the Seria field had become the top oil producer in the Commonwealth. Most of the crude oil was piped directly to tankers anchored offshore, while only a small amount was refined locally at Lutong, approximately 45 miles (72 km). The refined oil was then exported to countries including Australia, the United States, Indonesia, and Japan. In September that year, the "Seria Sky Hook" was scheduled to open. This mile-long aerial cable railway was designed to link the beach with an artificial steel island offshore. From this facility, drilling was carried out into previously undiscovered reserves in the South China Sea. The aim was to reach deeper and more remote deposits, supplementing the existing offshore wells that were already in production and accessible by jetties.

In 1953, the BMPC began transporting cargo from deep-sea ships to the oil fields in Seria using World War II LCTs (Landing Craft, Tank. That same year, the oil field began producing both heavy oil from relatively shallow wells and light oil from wells deeper than 5,000 feet. A record-breaking 36,496,599 barrels were produced in 1953. In September 1954, a large new plant began operating at Seria to extract petroleum fractions from waste gas. Alongside this, a small refinery processed approximately 100 tonnes (98 long tons; 110 short tons) of crude oil daily to meet the needs of the field and the growing local demand for fuel. On 8 July 1955, the 400th well was quietly spudded, immediately following the completion of well S-396 the day before. On 24 December, BMPC managing director R. E. Hales remarked "...developments during the year find us with a year's oil production higher than we have ever had before. In fact we have produced some four million barrels of oil more than we thought we would." Peak output at the oil field was reached in 1956, when daily oil production peaked at 115,000 barrels. On 11 November 1958, BSP announced that its engineers had begun drilling the 500th well at Seria since the original discovery of oil.

The oil field was seized by rebels during the 1962 Brunei revolt, during which senior officers, including then-Managing Director Patrick Linton, were held hostage. This incident remains a source of deep concern for BSP and has contributed to Sultan Omar Ali Saifuddien III's cautious approach to British withdrawal and the potential loss of Gurkha security forces. The Seria field later expanded with the development of the South West Ampa gas field in July 1963.

By 1970, approximately 60 percent of the 129,000 barrels produced per day came from offshore sources, with the remainder from the Seria land field. Output rose to an average of 250,000 barrels per day by 1979, with onshore production making up only 15 percent. On 8 December 1971, BSP initiated flood mitigation measures to protect the oil field from king tides and seasonal flooding. The Seria Crude Oil Terminal was officially opened by Sultan Hassanal Bolkiah on 5 June 1972. While national oil production shifted offshore, the field remained vital, particularly with the addition of the Tali Field in 1978. In July 1980, the Brunei government approved an expansion of the Seria oilfield’s refining capacity from 2,000 to 10,000 barrels per day by the end of 1982 to satisfy domestic fuel demand. The Brunei Shell Refinery (BSR), a crude oil processing facility, began operations in 1982 and was officially commissioned in 1983 by Crown Prince Al-Muhtadee Billah.

Since 1990, the Seria oil field has consistently produced around 20,000 barrels of oil per day. By the end of 1996, cumulative production had reached 164 million cubic metres, accounting for approximately 34 percent of the estimated in-place reserves. In 1998, the acquisition of new high-resolution 3D seismic data over the shallow marine surf zone led to the identification of several undrilled blocks on the north flank of the Seria anticline. On 8 October 2004, BSP made a new discovery in this area, drilling a well 3 kilometres offshore in 8 metres of water using a self-propelled multi-purpose vessel operated by Schlumberger. Further discoveries were made in adjacent blocks in 2005 and 2006 through follow-up drilling. The BSR, which had powered the country for four decades, produced approximately 18,000 barrels of oil equivalent per day before being decommissioned in 2021.

== Incidents ==
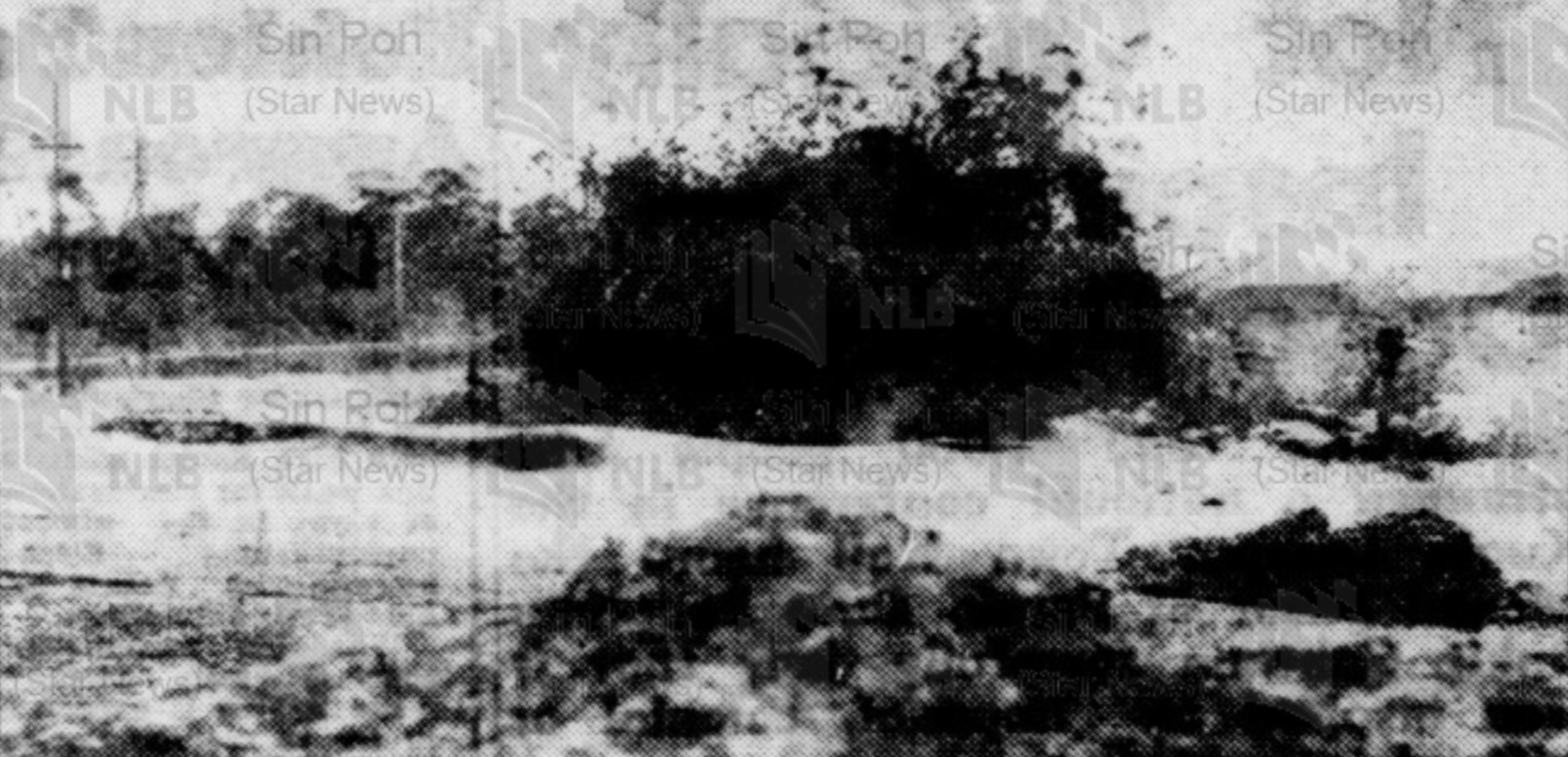
Mud geysers erupting from the oil well S-328 in April 1953

On 28 April 1953, engineers from the BMPC struggled to control sudden gas and mud geysers that erupted unexpectedly in oil well S-328. One geyser, near a 70-foot (21 m) high concrete plant for mass production, caused the plant to collapse after being rapidly undermined. Around 300 nearby residents were evacuated, and the area was secured by the Brunei Police Force. The managing director, R. E. Hales, explained that a pocket of high-pressure gas deep underground broke through at two locations, forcing mud and water to the surface. Despite significant damage, there were no injuries or fatalities, thanks to the quick actions of the workers. The company staff worked tirelessly, some for over 24 hours, to manage the emergency, while the oilfield remains under surveillance to prevent further incidents.

On 6 August 1954, a fire in the Seria oil field caused an estimated M$3,500 in damage, destroying three storage buildings that housed machinery belts, furniture, and a trade training school, while engineers managed to shut off two nearby oil wells. Less than two weeks later, on 20 August a second major fire broke out during a thunderstorm, likely caused by lightning, destroying two more storage buildings across the road and resulting in an estimated M$400,000 in damage. One building contained over 100 refrigerators, gas stoves, and furniture for staff housing, while the other stored 20 to 30 tons of bolts and nuts. The fire also threatened a nearby paint store holding several thousand gallons of paint but was successfully contained by firefighters and volunteers.

== See also ==
- Oil and natural gas in Brunei

== Bibliography ==
- Crosbie, A. J. (1981). "Brunei in Transition". Southeast Asian Affairs. ISEAS – Yusof Ishak Institute: 75–92. ISSN 0377-5437. JSTOR 27908423.
- Hamzah Ahmad (1980). "Oil and Security in Brunei". Contemporary Southeast Asia. 2 (2). ISEAS – Yusof Ishak Institute: 182–191. ISSN 0129-797X. JSTOR 25797614.
