= A. M. Azahari =

Bruneian politician (1928–2002)

- ازاهاري
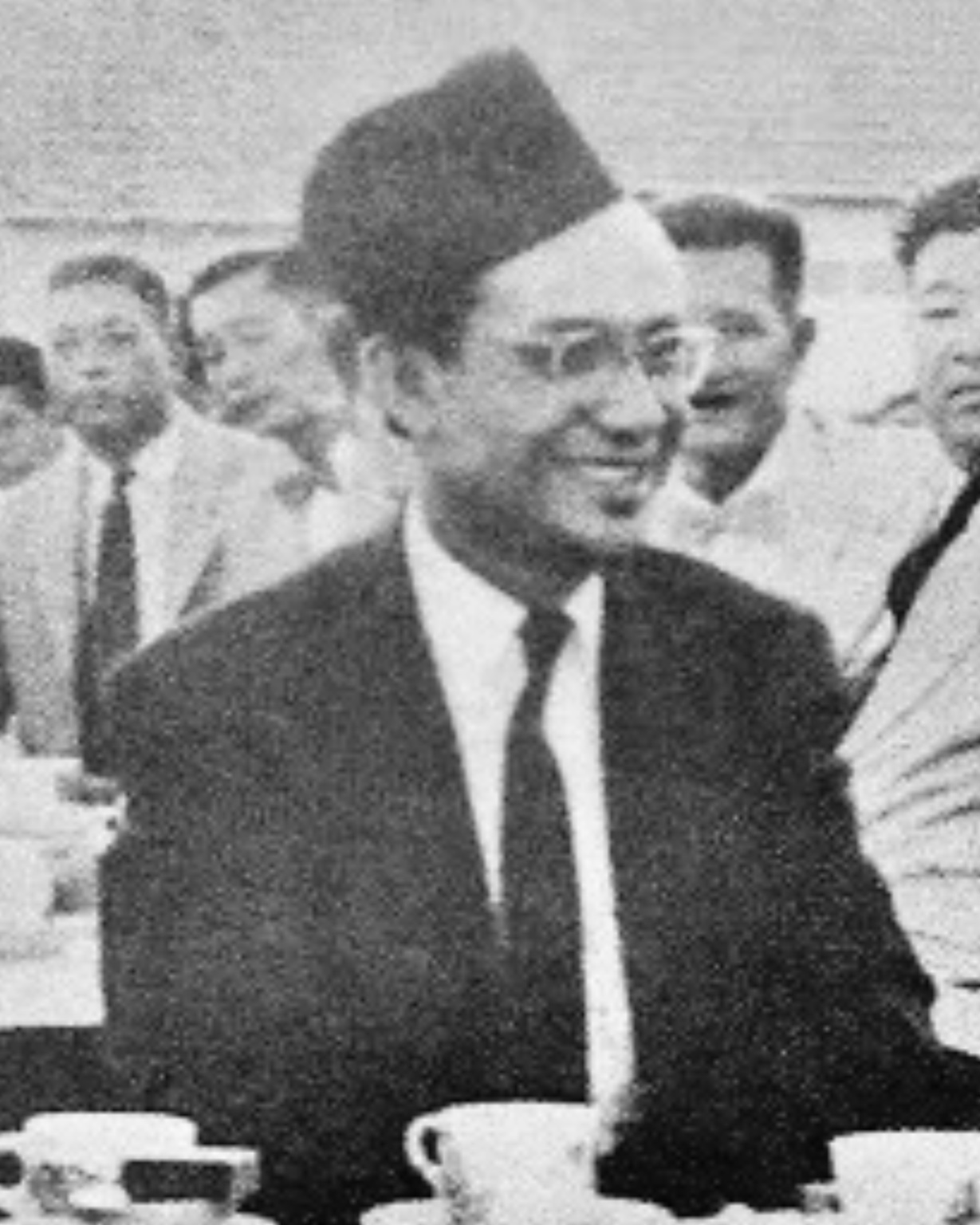
- Azahari in 1959

Prime Minister of the Federation of North Kalimantan
- In office 8 December 1961 – 18 December 1962

Leader of the Partai Rakyat Brunei
- In office 21 January 1956 – 18 December 1962

Personal details
- Born: Sheikh Ahmad M. Azahari bin Sheikh Mahmud; 28 August 1928 Crown Colony of Labuan
- Died: 30 May 2002 (aged 73) Bogor, West Java, Indonesia
- Party: PRB (1956–2002)
- Relations: Pengiran Mohammad (uncle); Mahmud Saedon (nephew)
- Parent: Sheikh Mahmud (father)
- Education: St. George's School
- Occupation: Military officer; businessman; politician

Military service
- Allegiance: Indonesia
- Branch/service: Indonesian National Armed Forces
- Years of service: 1945–1949
- Rank: Captain
- Battles/wars: World War II; Battle of Palembang; Indonesian National Revolution; Battle of Surabaya

Sheikh Ahmad M. Azahari bin Sheikh Mahmud (28 August 1928 – 30 May 2002), better known as A. M. Azahari, was a Bruneian politician, businessman and nationalist who fought against Dutch colonialism in the Dutch East Indies, the chairman of the Parti Rakyat Brunei (Brunei People's Party) from 1947 to 1962, and the Prime Minister of the North Borneo Federation in 1962.

Having trained under the Japanese, Azahari elevated Brunei's political opposition to colonialism to unprecedented levels. After serving as an anti-colonialist soldier in Java, he returned in 1952 and became the catalyst for the Brunei revolt against British colonial interests. During the 20th century, he was arguably the most charismatic politician in Brunei. He was an instrument of Indonesian imperialism and is known to have publicly opposed Brunei's admission into the Federation of Malaysia.

== Early life and education ==
A. M. Azahari, also known as Sheikh Ahmad M. Azahari bin Sheikh Mahmud, was born in the Crown Colony of Labuan on 28 August 1928. His mother was Bruneian Malay, while his grandfather, Sheikh Abdul Hamid, was of Arab descent hence the Sheikh moniker. He has three brothers who are Sheikh Nikman, Sheikh Muhammad and Sheikh Osman. In addition, Mahmud Saedon is his nephew. He was raised in a family with ties to the Bruneian sultan, whose ancestry predates the initial waves of European colonisation. According to historian Bachamiya A. Hussainmiya, it is not possible to verify the truth about his 'Brunei birth'. Many people claimed he was born in Labuan, but Azahari strongly denied the claims and said he was born in Brunei Town in a house on the site where the Churchill Memorial Museum (currently Royal Regalia Museum) was later built.

In pre-war Brunei, Azahari had known Omar Ali Saifuddin, the younger brother of the 27th Sultan of Brunei, Ahmad Tajuddin. He attended the Brunei Town Catholic mission school (later St. George's School) and studied English there. The Japanese occupation of Brunei, they chose Azahari, then fifteen years old, to go to school in the Dutch East Indies and pursue a career in veterinary medicine.

Despite going against his parents' wishes, he arrived alone in Jakarta with what appeared to be inadequate documentation to sustain his claim he was on a Japanese scholarship, he was temporarily detained by the Kempeitai. He was only allowed to continue south to Buitenzorg when a military administrator from Jakarta interfered. As the only delegate from Brunei, Azahari quickly got to know Ahmad Zaidi Adruce, the delegate from Sarawak. He did not finish his official training in Java, he stayed on and enrolled at the Sekolah Ekonomik (Economics School) in 1947, where he spent two of his four years course studying business-related courses.

== Independence of Indonesia ==
Azahari joined the Indonesian independence movement against the Dutch East Indies after meeting Mohammad Hatta in Java. He became friends with Ahmad Zaidi Adruce of Sarawak at Bogor, and the two of them started an independence movement for the British-ruled areas of northern Borneo. After Sukarno and Hatta unilaterally declared Indonesian independence on 17 August 1945, Azahari entered the fight against the Dutch and fought in the Battle of Palembang and Battle of Surabaya. He enlisted in the Badan Keamanan Rakyat (BKR), which was General Sudirman's predecessor to the Indonesian Army, in the middle of 1945.

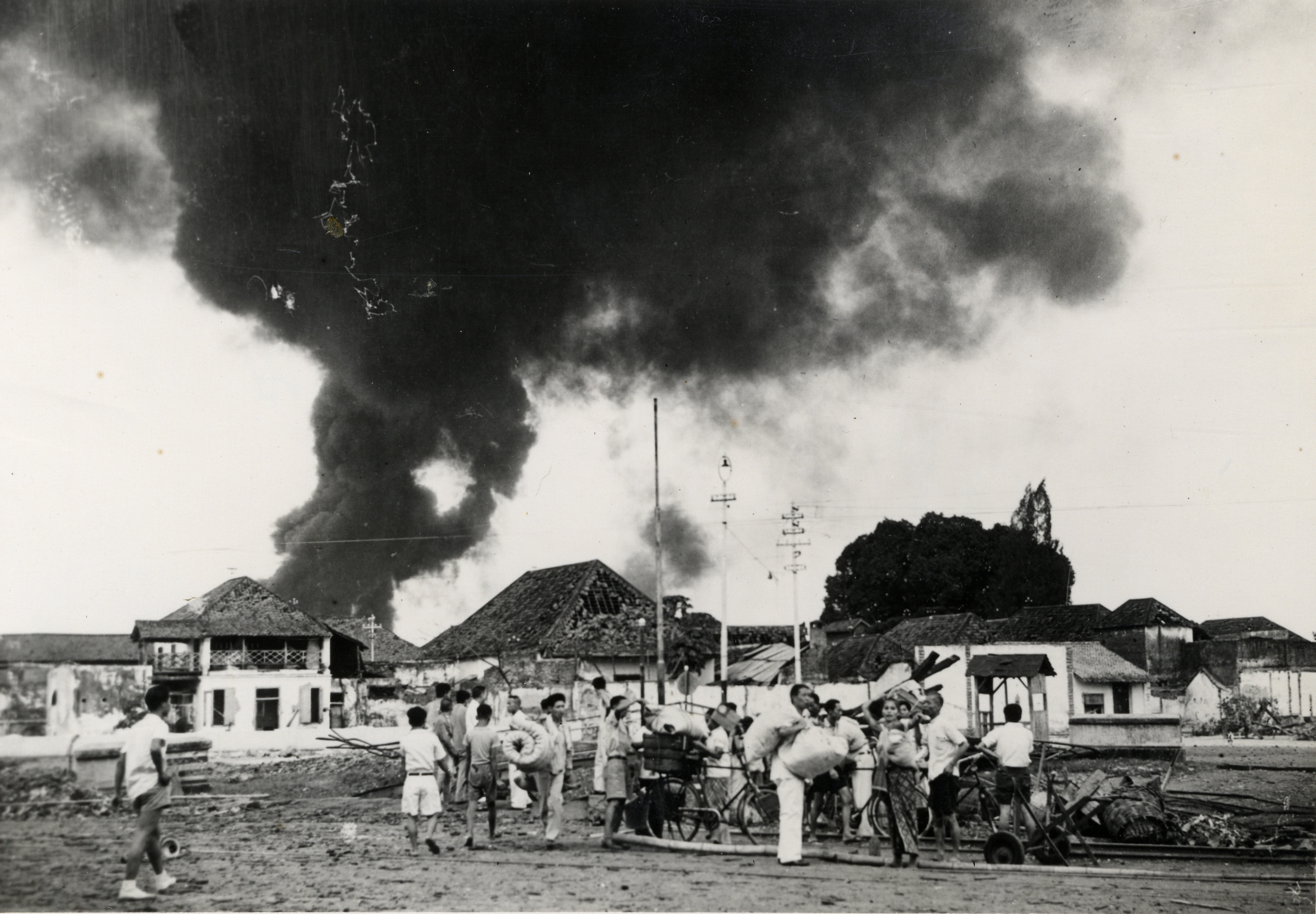
Chinese refugees during the Battle of Surabaya in 1945

He stayed in the Dutch East Indies for the duration of the Indonesian National Revolution. When Dutch and British soldiers landed in Tanjung Priok in September and October 1945, he took part in demonstrations and fighting. Using Japanese weaponry, the BKR—later renamed Tentara Keamanan Rakyat (TKR)—fought in several clashes at Tanah Tinggi. To make his first mission in Banten easier, he learned the Sundanese language and taught a group of twenty-seven recruits. An important incident that happened while he was there was the killing of an Indonesian commander and seven other people while fighting Dutch soldiers close to Tangerang. Even though their remains were only found a week after the war, he performed a ceremony for their burial in front of a mosque.

While on a visit to Jakarta, he was captured by the Dutch and sent into British captivity, where he fully revealed to British officials his role in the Indonesian independence movement before being freed. Under the leadership of Raden Muliarwan and Colonel Sambas Atmadinata, Azahari operated in Purwakarta from 1946 to 1950, mostly obtaining intelligence on Dutch operations. For over a month and a half, he covered a large region on foot to report on enemy operations southeast of Jakarta. Because of his commitment to Islam during these operations, he gained respect from Islamic insurgents who ran their own separate operations alongside the nationalist movement.

He participated in the motorcade parade celebrating Indonesian independence from Purwakarta in 1949. In an effort to avoid factional conflicts following victory, district military commanders were entrusted with ensuring an easy transition to Indonesian governance. Despite the considerable Islamic separatist presence in the region, Azahari's nomination as head of the administrative committee for West Java acknowledged his relationship with Darul Islam leaders. Sambas, who had first welcomed his appointment, was taken aback when he foresaw continued instability in the event that talks with Darul Islam would not begin. He quit when Sambas accused him of advocating, but a number of influential people, including the chief of police, the government secretary, and the leader of the West Java Masjumi, pushed him to change his mind. However, he declined. In an additional act of protest, he resigned as a captain in the Indonesian Armed Forces. As soon as he completed this task, he was contacted by Sukamto, the head of the national police, and his deputy to join Captain Soeprapto.

== Return to Brunei ==
After five years, Azahari finally returned to Brunei, but not before encountering challenges organised by British Resident Eric Ernest Falk Pretty, who at first denied his request to come back even after his identity was known. Pretty, who had known his family prior to the war, attempted to convince his uncle, Pengiran Mohammad, not to help arrange for his return, arguing that Sukarno had had a bad effect on him. In the end, he got a travel visa from the British embassy in Jakarta and went to Singapore, where he stayed with a Bruneian family until money was supplied, with the Colonial Office delegating the choice to the Sultan. Only a select handful were originally aware of his covert return to Brunei; he arrived by ship to Labuan, where he saw his father before being transported by his uncle. Despite this, he arrived in Brunei in October 1952 and once obtaining Sultan Omar Ali Saifuddien III's approval.

Hales, the manager of BMPC, was eager to deport the last forty Indonesian workers in 1953, so he purposefully portrayed them, Azahari, and the dissatisfaction among Bruneian Malay labour force as a danger to the company's ability to produce oil. Azahari's involvement in the independence struggle and his exploits during the Indonesian revolution won him great admiration from the younger generation. However, British oil interests aimed to throw doubt on his intentions and damage his standing with the Sultan. He was seen as a danger to the British Malayan Petroleum Company's (BMPC) economic interests in Brunei, and they described him as a "communist troublemaker and promoter of Indonesian interests."

Azahari's attempt to form the Brunei Film Production Company (BRUFICO) on 28 October 1952, was a calculated move to draw attention to Brunei's injustices committed by the British. He suggested issuing shares to raise M$250,000. His application was denied because Bruneians were not permitted to independently create these kinds of businesses under the rules in effect at the time. The colonial officials interfered, refusing registration despite the Sultan's original desire to become a stakeholder and igniting a protest against Brunei's restrictive business laws. Together with a sizable group of people, Azahari and his brothers petitioned British Resident J.C.H. Barcroft on 23 January 1953, asking him to reevaluate their application for the Brunei Film Company. The assembly was authorised by State Treasurer E.Q. Cousins at first since the European police officer was not there, but Barcroft eventually declared it to be illegal.

Azahari and his brothers were persuaded to come outside by police officials to prevent any legal complications with their arrests inside their father's home. Once outside, they were taken into custody. On 29 January, Azahari and seven other people—among them his third brother, Sheikh Nikman—were accused of being participants of an unlawful assembly and breach of the peace. He was given a six-month sentence imprisonment by the magistrate, Assistant Resident G.A.T. Shaw. Shaw declared that he would not allow Brunei's calm to be disturbed. Despite being in jail, his popularity grew, and an underground movement (Gerakan bawah di tanah) began forming, with plans to organize a revolt, take over police stations, release Azahari, and establish a provisional government under his leadership. After his release, from 1953 to 1956, Azahari focused on business activities, frequently traveling between Singapore and Malaya.

His father, Sheikh Mahmud, asked Singaporean attorney David Marshall, to handle an appeal, which was heard on 4 March 1953. His sentence was lowered from six months in prison and a M$500 fine to just three months. Two days before the appeal, a false rumour circulated claiming that his loyal forces were about to rebel, creating a crisis. The rumour stemmed from the desertion of six constables from the oilfield detachment, who left a note indicating they were joining the resistance forces in the jungle. Another rumor suggested all police were poised to surrender their weapons to the Indonesian labour force and carry out mass desertion. Early 1953 BMPC investigations revealed that him, with direct help from Indonesia, was aiming to take over police stations, acquire weapons, and gather the European people.

Deportation was an option for Azahari in Brunei, but it would require taking the natural-born citizen of Brunei and transferring him to Indonesia. Instead, the chief secretary of Anthony Abell suggested a different strategy for handling him. He recommended that Azahari be sent to a secluded area in Brunei and "rusticated." seemed unaware of the consequences of colonial authoritarian control. Despite being highly controversial, Brunei passed rustication laws 'without much trouble,' keeping Azahari in mind. Azahari became close friends with British Resident John Orman Gilbert and concentrated on managing his bus company, which employed 72 people and provided support to many in the oilfields. Gilbert stated that Azahari was no longer a problem and was actively involved in a number of companies, such as a stationery store, a quarry, a stone-crushing company, and a newspaper known as Suara Bakti (Voice of Service). With the help of Mesir Karuddin, his old prison warden, Azahari persisted in pursuing his political objectives despite his commercial endeavours.

Based on the Indonesian revolution, Azahari created a strategic plan for Brunei's anti-colonial uprising. He started by infiltrating the local security system, creating secret groups to educate activists, and looking for a reason for a widespread rebellion. He organised the populace against any oppression by the British government and promoted trade union activities to sabotage the BMPC. He was passionate about gaining independence, but he was torn between supporting the Brunei monarchy and opposing the colonisers. He knew that the monarchy was an essential symbol of Malay unity and that it could not be directly challenged in his fight. In addition to being the head of state, the Sultan of Brunei served as the main authority figure for the British government. As a result, his goal of overthrowing the Sultan and establishing a republic was unlikely to have much support, according to a 1953 report by Abell.

== Partai Rakyat Brunei ==
Azahari's aspirations in politics were triggered by the Alliance Party's overwhelming electoral win in Malaya in 1955 and the call for Merdeka, or independence. He backed Tunku Abdul Rahman's demand for a unified front for independence that included Northern Borneo by attending the UMNO congress in Kuala Lumpur. In contrast to Tunku's pro-British position, Azahari was more in line with the left-leaning Partai Rakyat Malaya (PRM), which was anti-British and advocated for an enlarged Indonesian–Malay homeland. Disagreements among local leaders and the government's unwillingness to recognise the party caused Azahari's effort to form a PRM branch in Brunei in January 1955 to fail.

He had been contacts with Che'gu Harun Mohammed Amin, also known as Harun Rashid, who had been in Brunei for a long time, from 1955. Harun was the one who initially introduced him to Dr. Burhanuddin al-Helmy and Ahmad Boestamam, two left-leaning Malayan politicians, in 1955. He was present during the PRM's debut in Perak on 11 November 1955, which was led by Ahmad. To establish a "Malay Homeland" and rebel against colonial control, the PRM made an appeal to all of the Malays living across the archipelago. Since Azahari wanted an independent Brunei to reject neo-capitalism and "accept Socialist-Nationalist-Democracy" as his slogan, naming his party the Nationalist Socialist Party, its motto connected with him more than that of UMNO.

British Resident Gilbert, Anthony Abell, and Malcolm MacDonald were among the people with whom Azahari and his supporters had conversations. He was seen as the most suitable candidate for party head, and the administrators, who were passionate supporters of democratic customs, probably saw the PRB as a good thing. In spite of his anti-colonialist views, Azahari held the British government in high regard, stressing in his first PRB address that they appreciated the British as educators rather than disliking them, particularly if the British acknowledged their rights. The politically underdeveloped bordering regions of Sarawak and North Borneo shared more parallels with Brunei than with the Malayan Federation.

Eventually, on 15 August 1956, Azahari and H.M. Salleh collaborated to establish the Partai Rakyat Brunei (PRB), which became the first political party in Brunei and Northern Borneo and attracted about 10,000 local members rapidly. The party called for Brunei's independence through constitutional routes and condemned all kinds of colonialism in the political, economic, and social sectors. It promised to uphold the Sultan's constitutional monarchy and attempted to bring together all the states inside the Malay Archipelago into a single Malay country. In terms of economics, the PRB supported the welfare of workers and the fair allocation of public resources. The PRB also pressed the British to grant the locals political and economic rights.

The first written Constitution was to be introduced by the Sultan in May 1953, but the process took longer than expected because of multiple requests from the colonial government, the PRB, and the monarch. Seeking to maintain his rule, the Sultan rejected attempts by the British and allies of the Azahari to limit his authority. its advancement was slowed by the PRB's initial refusal to take part in the nominated Local Councils under the 1956 Enactment, despite its desire for a larger involvement in the intended legislative and executive councils. A dissatisfied Azahari, whom the British considered an important political ally, threatened to revolt after long discussions between 1957 and 1959 failed to achieve the democratic goals of the PRB and preserved the Sultan's prerogatives. British officials Gilbert and Abell, viewing Azahari as the only reasonable politician they could negotiate with, discouraged him from quitting politics despite his occasional threats to do so.

Maintaining the Sultan's goodwill required the British government to strike a cautious balance, refraining from actively supporting Azahari's cause. It had little bearing on the discussions because the PRB engaged British attorney Walter Raeburn in May 1957 to deliver their Merdeka statement, which supported electoral ideals and representative rights, to the Colonial Office. In a failed effort to promote a popular government, he gatecrashed the Colonial Office during the September 1957 London discussions. After Abell rejected his plans for a ministerial style of government, Azahari felt demoralized and considered quitting politics to concentrate on his faltering companies. In the meantime, the Sultan vigorously refuted the PRB's propaganda and separated himself from them.

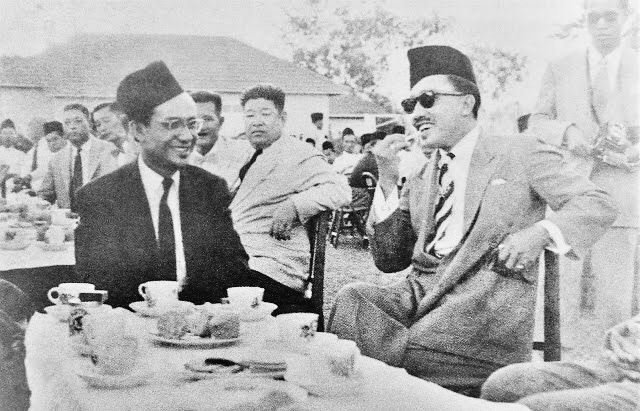
Azahari (left) and Sultan Omar Ali Saifuddien III at a tea party in 1959

The PRB saw the Constitution as a setback to their hopes, viewing it as a tool of colonialism that gave Brunei self-rule instead of self-administration. The PRB felt that the Constitution will only help a select few Bruneians and the British, rendering the party powerless and confined to press release protests. In spite of this, he accepted the Sultan's nomination to the temporary Legislative Council out of respect to him. His resolution for his Kalimantan Utara plan was defeated after he took office on 16 April 1958. This prompted him to denounce the council as undemocratic and a colonial relic that may push people toward communism, signaling his irreversible departure from representative politics. Following his resignation, an irate Azahari complained,

I am downhearted and despondent that my work as a nationalist... appears to be of no avail under the present system... in Brunei.

— A. M. Azahari, Borneo Bulletin, 5 May 1962

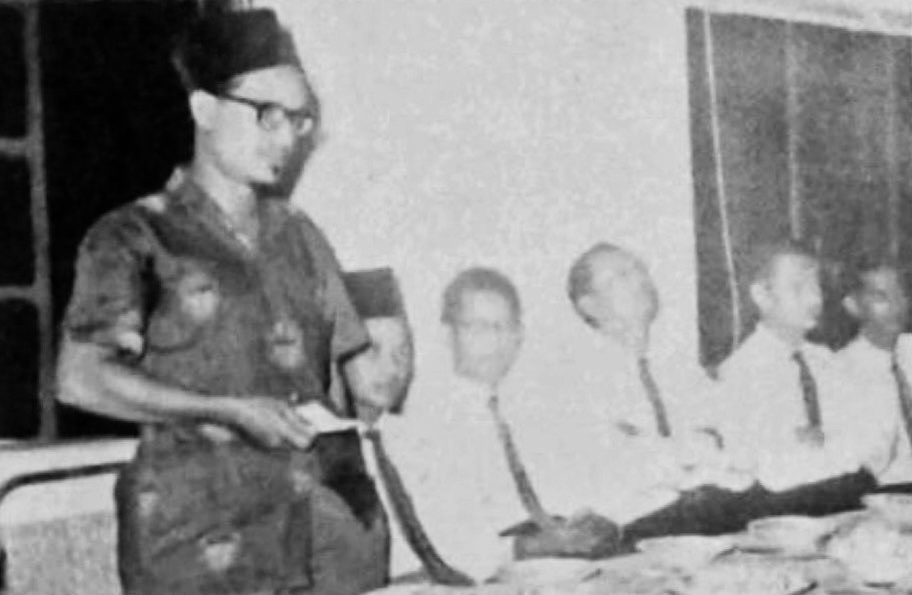
Azahari (standing) giving a World Labour Day speech in 1961

To keep the PRB together, Azahari responded to the various goals of his supporters, with the backing of the together Barisan Buruh Bersatu Brunei (4B), which promised to support the PRB's initiatives. Tensions increased as the party stepped up its verbal assaults on the administration. To aid in the establishment of a state in North Kalimantan, the PRB started a joint campaign in the middle of June 1961 and established the TNKU. To keep the PRB together, he appealed to the various goals of his supporters, with the backing of the together 4B.

Given his socialist leanings, Azahari was able to establish contact with anti-capitalist people, nations, and organisations via collaborating with like-minded Malayan mentors and peers. His travels to Indonesia, Kuching, and Singapore in 1961 and 1962 put him in touch with groups who were suspected of having ties to communist parties: Partindo, the Sarawak United Peoples' Party, and the Barisan Sosialis. By this unintentional link, he was accused of being a communist despite was not being one. In light of Indonesia's Konfrontasi, a Sarawak that supported Azahari would also endanger British access to Brunei's oil deposits.

The British authorities were concerned about his growing closer with Indonesia as he depended on Indonesian assistance for TNKU soldier financing and training and looked to the Philippines for moral support. He had been traveling to Indonesia since 1959, balancing with old revolutionary comrades who had backed his anti-colonial initiatives. A senior PRB leader visited Jakarta in mid-August 1961 to seek support for him. By October 1961, almost every significant member of the PRB was in Jakarta, and a delegation from the PRB attended the Partindo conference on 23 February 1962.

In August 1962, the district council election were held. With resistance to the Malaysia plan as the centerpiece of its election agenda, the PRB secured 22 out of 23 seats and achieved an unambiguous win. This triumph proved the PRB's enormous popularity and its authority to speak for Bruneians both locally and nationally. The PRB said in January 1961, during its Fifth Annual General Assembly, that it would declare independence in 1963 if it won a sizable majority in the elections.

== Brunei revolt ==
Amidst concerns that a member appointed by the government may turn against the Brunei administration and support PRB resolutions, the Bruneian government repeatedly stopped Legislative Council meetings to stall PRB initiatives. Disappointed by the lack of progress, leaders of the PRB, such as Azahari, looked at other options in light of the political standstill, including possible violent intervention by the TNKU, and pushed for quick democratic changes. This would also be followed by communist protests both directly and indirectly across Malaya, including Singapore.

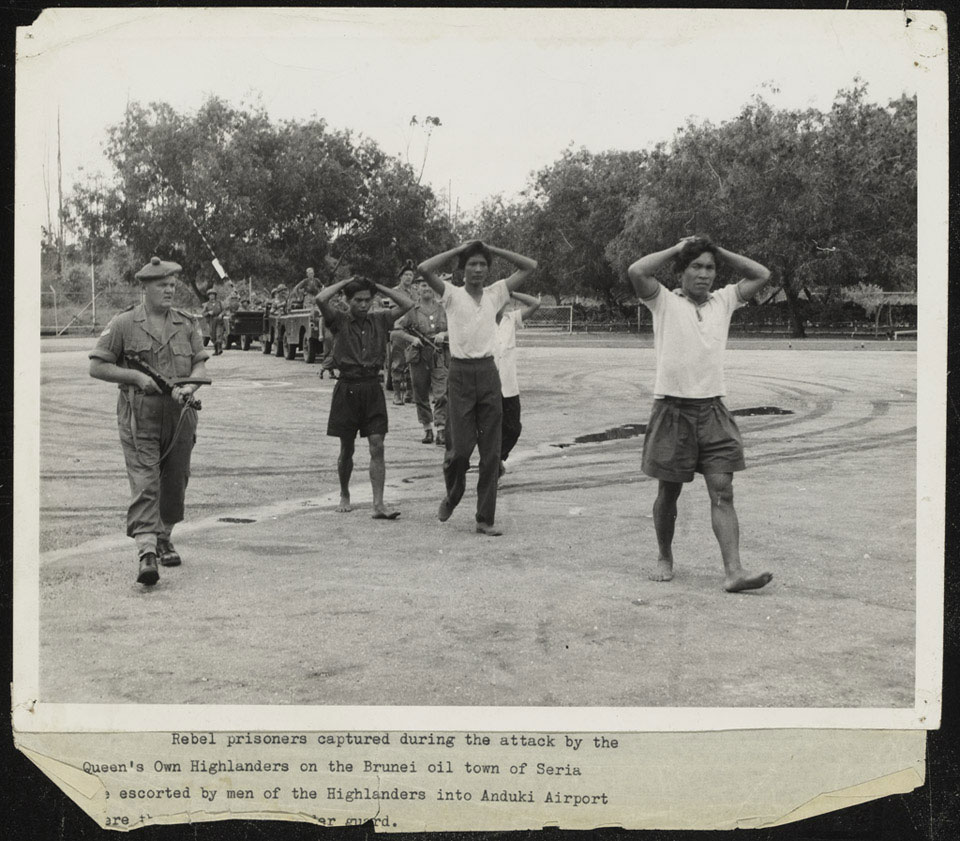
Captured TNKU rebels being marched to Anduki Airfield in 1962

After Azahari left for Manila on 8 December 1962, at two in the morning, Brunei revolt, an armed uprising led by the TNKU, broke out in Brunei. At this point, his British passport was revoked. He was unlikely to have had much influence over the TNKU's daily operations. However, in his capacity as the spokesperson for Bruneian politics, he made clear that the uprising was really against British colonialism and the Malaysia plan, with the goal of creating a Unitary State of North Borneo led by the Sultan. While in Manila, he declared the formation of his government's war cabinet for Kalimantan Utara, or North Kalimantan. The Philippines Government stayed uncommitted to Azahari, the leader of the Brunei revolt, despite the fact that he was in Manila when it broke out, receiving unofficial financial support and sympathetic hearings from high officials. Azahari's plans for a unitary Bornean state ran embarrassingly counter to the Philippines' claim to Sabah. Notably, he has maintained communication with Said Zahari and Lim Chin Siong of Barisan Sosialis.

After seizing control of the Seria oil fields quickly and capturing many Europeans as prisoners, the Yassin Affandi-led rebels targeted Brunei Town's government facilities, including the police station. Sarawak's neighboring regions of North Borneo also saw incidents." After a failed attempt to apprehend the Sultan and force him to accept the revolution, the Sultan went on to request British support. Two companies of the 1/2nd Gurkha Rifles were quickly dispatched from Singapore to Brunei Airport, which was empty on the first night of the uprising, despite early uncertainty. After securing the airport, the Gurkhas advanced on the city and discovered the Sultan in his palace (Istana Darul Hana) uninjured. The resistance quickly crumbled because the TNKU volunteers, who were just lightly equipped, were unable to hold out against strong force. The Queen's Own Highlanders and Royal Marines 42 Commando were among the British forces that later successfully retook Seria and other regions. By 16 December, most major settlements were once again under government authority, putting an end to the uprising.

The cause for the defeat of the revolt was believed to be his departure. Despite the British military's superiority, Zaini Ahmad, his colleague who accompanied Azahari to Manila, thought that Azahari had to have spearheaded the revolution himself. Later on, Zaini attributed his supporters' turnabout on Azahari's absence. Among the chaos, the rebels perceived the Sultan as the new face of group leadership and, naturally, the center of allegiance. Azahari traveled to Indonesia, where he was given support, encouragement, and safety but was not given official government recognition.

The failed rebellion destroyed any goals for democratic progress and blocked Azahari's plan to establish a Northern Kalimantan State ruled by the Sultan as a constitutional monarchy. Rather, Brunei gave up on democracy and returned to a traditional Malay monarchy. After that, the state of emergency was imposed and is still in place, and Britain gave up trying to set up a representative government.

== Life in exile and death ==
After his defeat, Azahari fled to Jakarta where he was granted asylum by President Sukarno in 1963 and lived in Bogor, West Java. With assistance from Malaysia and Indonesia, he and his allies established an exile government following the failed revolt. Up until around 1975, Malaysia supported his cause in the United Nations, which strained relations with Brunei. But with the conclusion of Konfrontasi and the formation of ASEAN, regional diplomatic ties improved, and his goals diminished. The United States' stance on the rebellion contributed to Azahari's inability to secure a visa for the country.

At the age of 75, Azahari died in Bogor, Indonesia, on 30 May 2002, while residing in exile.
