= John Coleraine Hanbury Barcroft =

British colonial administrator (1908-1958)

John Barcroft CMG OSS
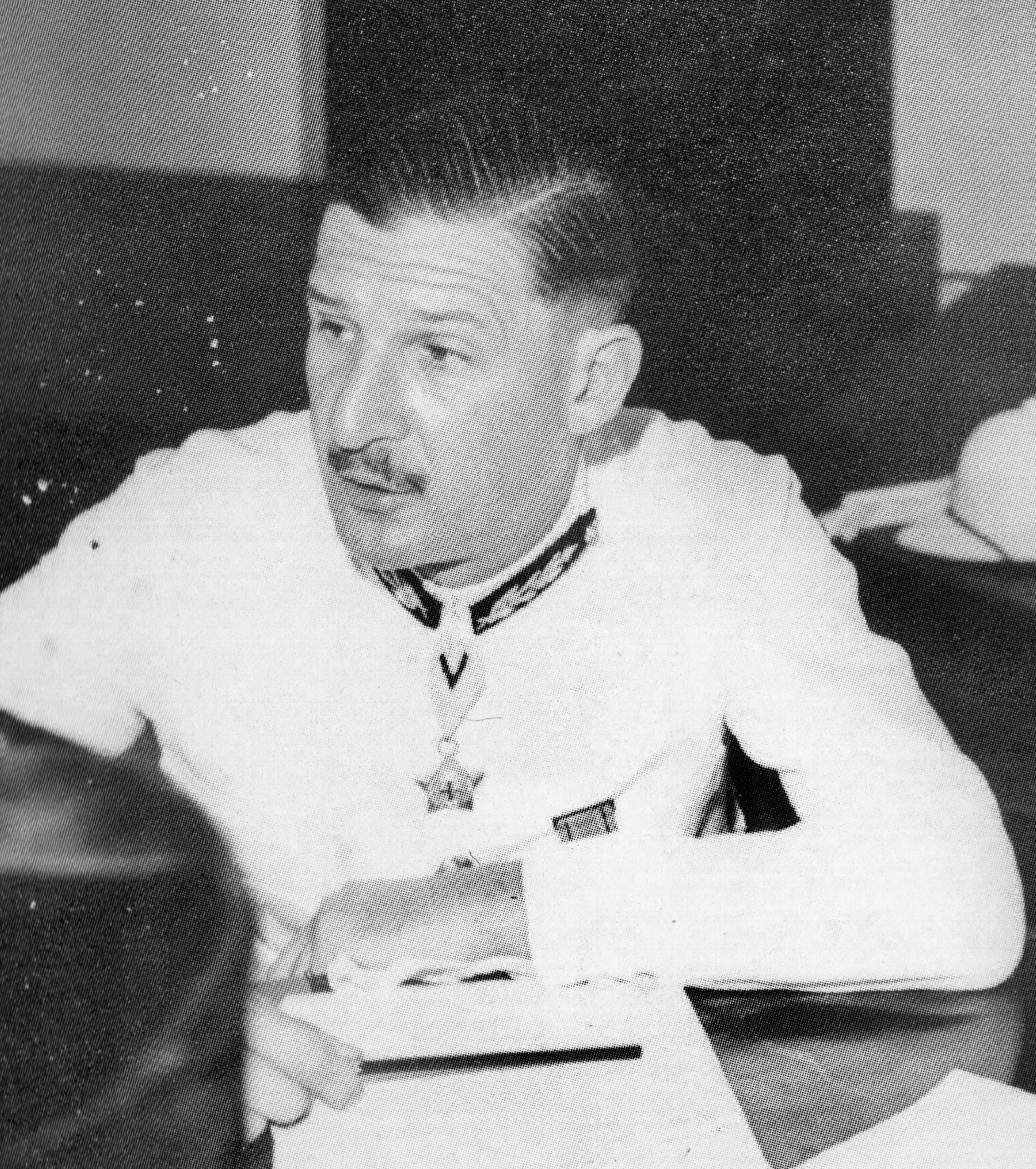
- Barcroft in 1951

Chief Secretary of Sarawak
- In office May 1958 – 6 June 1958
- Governor: Sir Anthony Abell
- Preceded by: Christopher William Dawson
- Succeeded by: Robert Gordon Aikman

Financial Secretary of Sarawak
- In office June 1955 – May 1958
- Governor: Sir Anthony Abell
- Succeeded by: Bryan Audley Hepburn

17th British Resident to Brunei
- In office July 1951 – June 1954
- Preceded by: Eric Ernest Falk Pretty
- Succeeded by: John Orman Gilbert

Personal details
- Born: 2 August 1908
- Died: 6 June 1958 (aged 49) Lawas, Crown Colony of Sarawak
- Education: Weymouth College
- Occupation: Colonial administrator

John Coleraine Hanbury Barcroft (2 August 1908 – 6 June 1958) was a British colonial administrator and civil servant who served as the British resident to Brunei from 1951 to 1954, Financial Secretary of Sarawak from June 1955 to May 1958, and as Chief Secretary of Sarawak from May 1958 to his death on 6 June 1958.

== Early life and education ==
John Coleraine Hanbury Barcroft was born on 2 August 1908 to Lieutenant-Colonel J. H. P. Barcroft of Kensington Close, W8, and Mrs. Barcroft of Marchwood, Hampshire. He received his education at Weymouth College and pursued further studies in Continental Europe.

== Career ==
=== Early career ===
Barcroft joined the Rajah's service as a cadet in February 1930 and spent his first seven years in the second division. During this time, he quickly acquired proficiency in the Dayak language and developed a deep understanding of Dayak law and customs. His skills and knowledge earned him recognition as one of the most outstanding young officers in Dayak administration. In 1931, Bertram Brooke selected him to accompany an expedition from the second division across the watershed to the Entabai and down the Kanowit River in an effort to quell Dayak unrest in the region. Barcroft served as an interpreter during Brooke’s interview with Asun, the rebel leader.

For the next year, Barcroft was actively involved in operations against the rebels, leading up to their surrender in 1933. To help resettle and pacify the Dayak community after the uprising, a new administrative station was established in the interior of Kanowit District in 1937, where Barcroft was appointed the first district officer of Meluan. He later served in Lawas and upper Sarawak before being stationed in Mukah at the time of the Japanese invasion.

After a brief furlough at home and the hardships of life as a civilian prisoner of war in Kuching, Barcroft returned to Sarawak to engage with the Dayaks on the issue of cession. Following the liberation, he resumed his service as a resident in the second division. Together with Edward Banks, Barcroft surveyed the population of Sarawak to gauge their views on possible annexation by the United Kingdom. In April 1946, he was appointed resident of Simanggang, and the following year, in 1947, he took up the role of resident of the third division.

=== British resident to Brunei ===
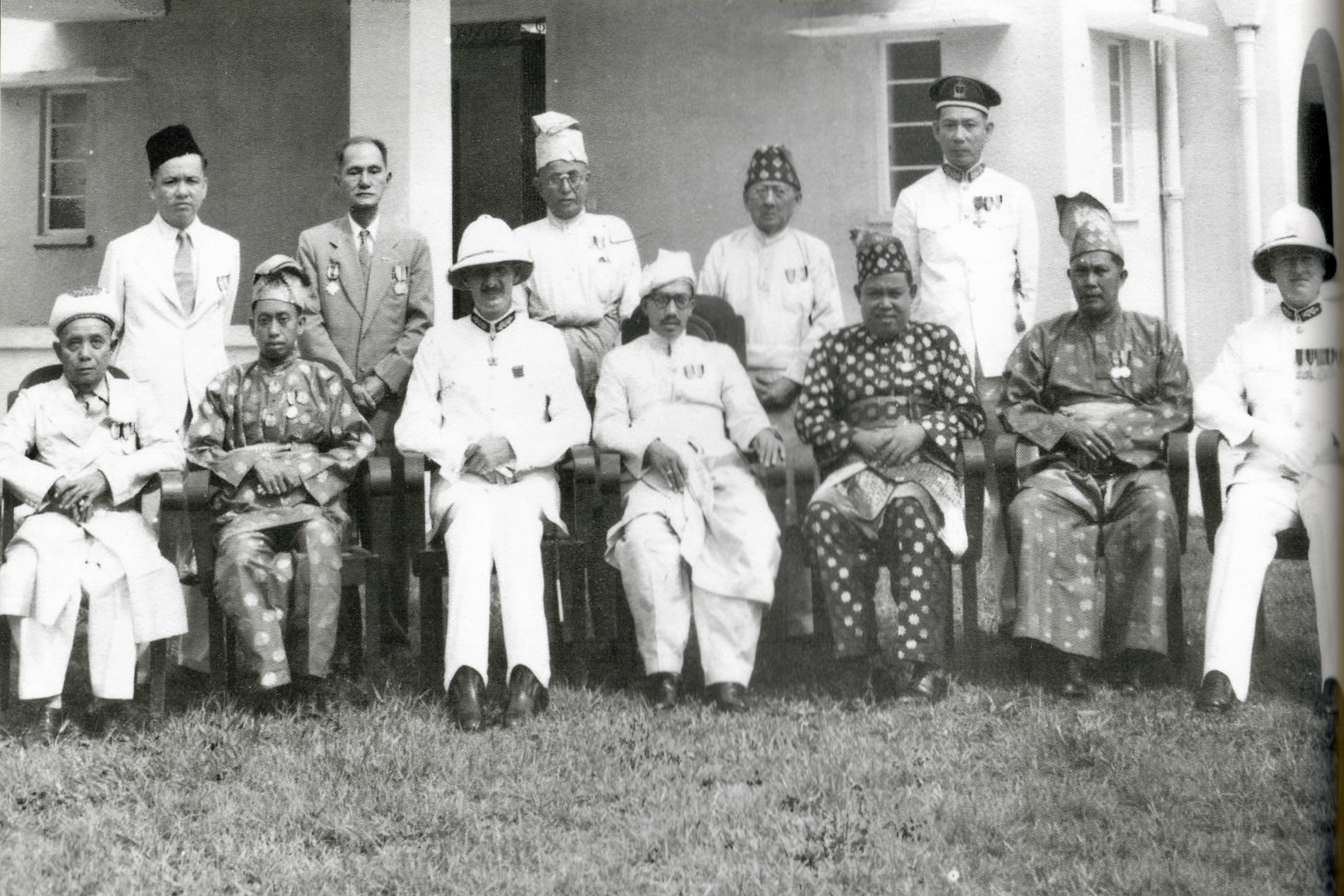
Barcroft (seated third from the left) at the Lapau alongside fellow State Council members in 1951

Barcroft was sent to Brunei in 1950 and was seconded as resident in July 1951, before being promoted to senior resident in 1952. He became the first officer from Sarawak to hold the position, replacing Eric Ernest Falk Pretty, the last Malayan Civil Service official to do so. In an effort to cut costs, Barcroft proposed delaying Sultan Omar Ali Saifuddien III's planned trip to England until the coronation of Elizabeth II in the following year. While High Commissioner Anthony Abell initially agreed, the sultan insisted on proceeding as Pretty had previously promised. The trip was seen as an opportunity for the sultan to engage with British officials and experience different cultures.

Barcroft also faced tensions over government-funded housing for Brunei's wazirs, Pengiran Muda Hashim and Pengiran Anak Mohamed Alam. Although his predecessor, Pretty, had initially proposed the project, Barcroft refused to approve costly modifications requested by the wazirs, citing financial constraints. While he later pledged to reconsider the changes in the 1953 budget estimates, his reluctance strained relations between the British administration and Brunei’s traditional elite. Further conflicts arose when the State Council delayed the approval of Enactment No. 11, which reorganised Brunei's superior courts and designated Her Majesty's Privy Council as the highest court of appeal. Frustrated by the delay, Barcroft, aware that the British parliament was on the verge of passing the corresponding Order in Council, sent a strongly worded letter demanding immediate approval. In protest, he refused to attend the proceedings on 14 November 1951, hinting at potential repercussions after recognising what he saw as the Omar Ali Saifuddien's council's deliberate resistance.

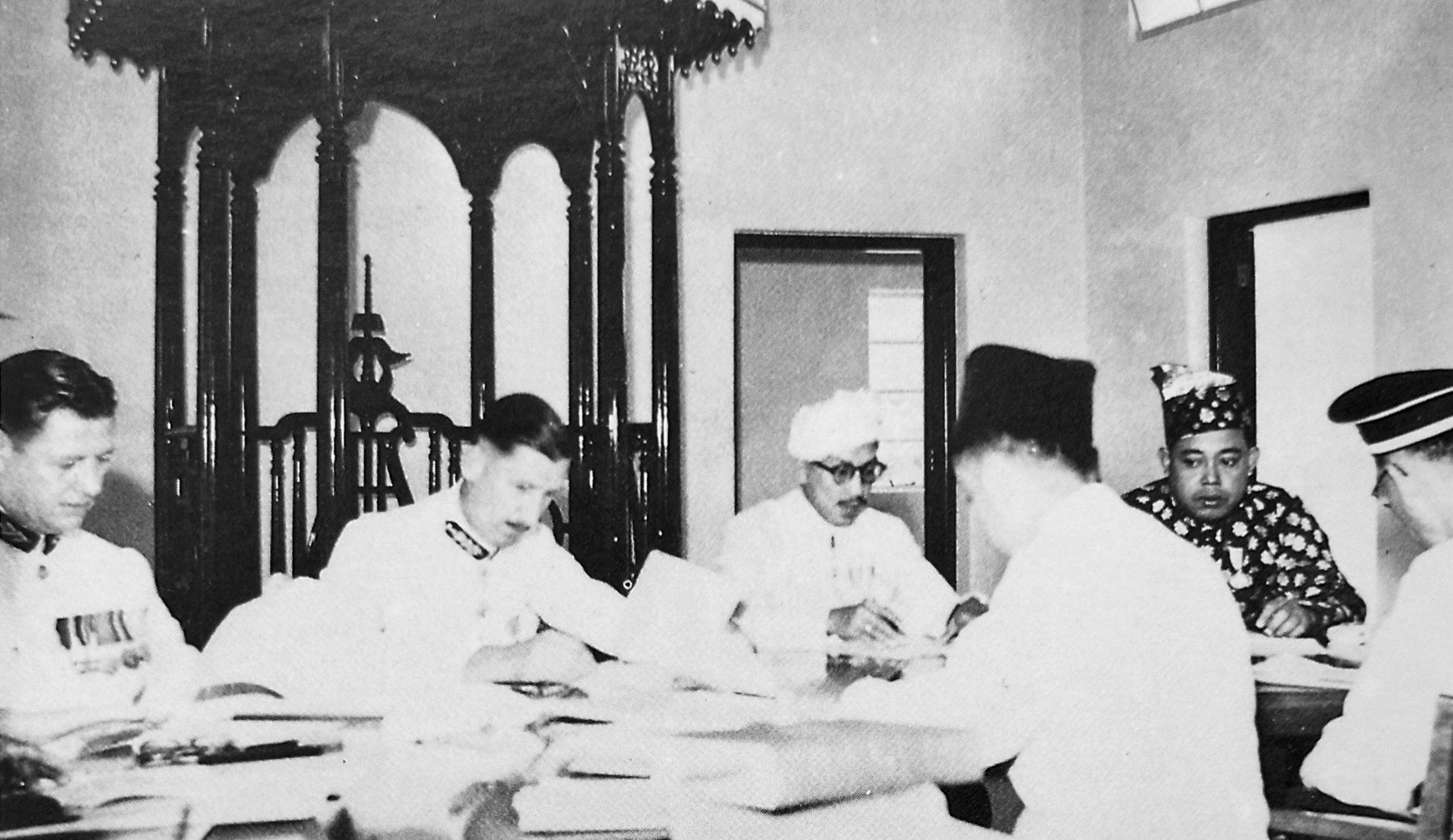
Barcroft (second from the left) during a 1951 State Council meeting held within the Lapau

The State Council opposed Barcroft's proposal for increased collaboration among the three Borneo territories, rejecting his plans for a regional children's home and the relocation of long-term inmates to Kuching on 30 September 1952, insisting on Brunei-based solutions. The State Council had also resisted his earlier proposal to enact the Sarawak Adoptions Ordinance, citing inconsistencies with Brunei's Islamic inheritance rules. As the first Sarawak-based resident under the 1948 Brunei–Sarawak administrative union, Barcroft struggled with shifting power dynamics in Brunei. The Omar Ali Saifuddien's first overseas trip as ruler underscored British control over state finances, even in religious matters. Uncertain of his authority, Barcroft attempted to enforce the repayment of advances made to the sultan for expenses beyond government-approved amounts. While the palace complied without protest, the issue was likely raised with Abell during his visit in October 1952.

On 23 January 1953, around 200 demonstrators marched to Barcroft's office, demanding an explanation for a rejected application, which led to a large-scale protest organized by A. M. Azahari. The State Treasurer, E. W. Cousens, panicked and allowed the group to wait while Barcroft was away. Upon his return, Barcroft declined to meet immediately and only agreed to meet with three representatives the following week. Azahari and his followers, however, demanded an immediate resolution, resulting in a standoff where police personnel, fearing they might harm their fellow Bruneians, refused to follow orders. Despite these tensions, Barcroft represented Brunei alongside Omar Ali Saifuddien and Ibrahim Mohammad Jahfar at the first Sarawak–North Borneo–Brunei Conference held in Kuching on 21 April 1953. The conference, pushed by Malcolm MacDonald and Abell, aimed to improve communication and collaboration across the three territories.

=== Chief secretary of Sarawak ===
In June 1954, Barcroft was succeeded as British resident to Brunei by John Orman Gilbert. In 1957, he presented a budget to the Council Negri that significantly increased taxes, including a fourfold hike in motor vehicle license fees, a new radio license charge, and higher import taxes on tobacco, cigarettes, and alcohol. These measures were expected to generate RM3.5 million in revenue, contributing to a RM158,545 surplus in the budget. Barcroft defended the tax increases by citing a fiscal survey conducted by Professor T. H. Silcock of the University of Malaya and emphasised the need for financing growth without borrowing, unless the projects could generate enough income to repay debts. The total budgeted expenditure amounted to RM50,164,555, with an additional RM34,200,686 allocated for development. Barcroft was finally appointed Sarawak's chief secretary in May 1958, following the retirement of J. H. Ellis.

== Death and funeral ==
Barcroft, the chief secretary of Sarawak, died on 6 June 1958 at 12:15 p.m. in Lawas while on an official tour. He suffered a heart attack on Tuesday and received immediate medical attention from W. C. Lees and Mrs. Devenish of the Borneo Evangelical Mission. Specialist physician Glyn Griffiths from Brunei, along with a nurse, flew in to assist, followed by two nurses from Miri who arrived via a Brunei Shell Petroleum helicopter. Despite these efforts, his condition worsened, and he died in the district officer's bungalow. His body was flown to Kuching for burial, with a funeral service held at St. Thomas's Cathedral on the same day at 5 p.m. In his honour, bells tolled at the cathedral and St. Joseph's Church, and flags were flown at half-mast across Sarawak until sundown on 7 June 1958.

With a Sarawak Constabulary line of honour lining the steps of St. Thomas's Cathedral, Barcroft's funeral was conducted with full honors. The Reverend L. R. Wilson, the provost of Kuching, welcomed Abell, just before 5 p.m. With the casket covered in the Union Jack and carried by eight Sarawak Constabulary Field Force personnel under the command of B. R. P. Edwards, the funeral cortege arrived at the cathedral at precisely five o'clock. Prominent individuals like C. B. Murray, Ong Hap Leong, Khoo Peng Loong, and Abang Haji Mustapha, were among the official pallbearers.

John Nichol, Abell's aide-de-camp, carried Barcroft's awards, sword, and insignia as the provost led the coffin into the church, with Abell following closely behind. The provost conducted the service, which included a reading of the lesson, before the cortege and a large gathering of mourners proceeded to the S.P.G. cemetery. Among those present at both the cathedral and graveside were Abell, Chief Justice Ernest Hillas Williams and his wife, the president of the Kuching Municipal Council, William Tan, members of the Supreme Council and Council Negri, the wives of Gilbert and Dennis White, as well as other government and law enforcement officials. In August 1958, the Second Division LB Advisory Council unanimously agreed to establish a memorial for Barcroft. The memorial would take the form of a scholarship, a field, or a building, depending on the funds available.

== Personal life ==
Among his pastimes were fishing, shooting, and riding.

== Honours ==
- Raj of Sarawak
  - Officer of the Order of the Star of Sarawak (OSS) (1946)
- United Kingdom
  - Companion of the Order of St Michael and St George (CMG) (1957)
