= Leslie Harold Newsom Davis =

British colonial administrator (1909–2003)

Leslie Harold Newsom Davis CMG
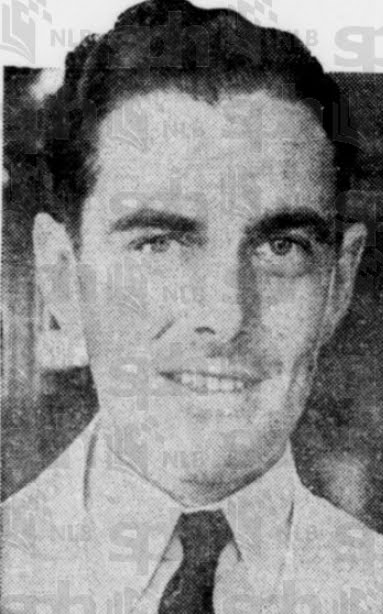
- Davis in 1938

16th British Resident to Brunei
- In office January 1948 – August 1948
- Preceded by: John Peel
- Succeeded by: Eric Pretty

Personal details
- Born: 6 April 1909 Luton, Bedfordshire, England
- Died: 16 June 2003 (aged 94)
- Spouse: Judith Anne (m. 1950)
- Education: Marlborough College
- Alma mater: Trinity College, Cambridge (BA; MA)
- Occupation: Colonial administrator

Military service
- Branch/service: British Indian Army
- Years of service: 1941–1945
- Unit: 22nd Indian Infantry Brigade
- Battles/wars: World War II; Malayan campaign

Leslie Harold Newsom Davis (6 April 1909 – 16 June 2003) was a British colonial administrator who served as Secretary for Defence to the Government of Singapore, during the 1950s.

== Early life and education ==
Davis was born on 6 April 1909, the son of Harold Newsom Davis. He was educated at Marlborough College and Trinity College, Cambridge where he received his BA in 1930 and MA in 1946.

== Career ==
Davis joined the Malayan Civil Service as a cadet in 1932, and served in various posts including assistant judge in Malacca (1933). In 1937, he was seconded for service under the Government of Johore. From 1938 to 1940, he served as private secretary to the governor and high commissioner, who was Sir Shenton Thomas. During the Second World War, he was attached to 22nd Indian Infantry Brigade as Liaison Officer, and in December 1941 fought in the Malayan campaign, and was interned as a POW by the Japanese in Singapore from 1942 to 1945.

After the Second World War, he served in various administrative posts including in succession: District Officer, Seremban (1946–47); British Resident, Brunei (1948); Assistant Adviser, Muar (1948–1950); Secretary to the Member for Education Federation of Malaya (1951–52), and Member for Industrial and Social Relations (1952–53).

From 1953 to 1955, Davis served as Secretary for Defence and Internal Security, Singapore, taking over from C.R.Forsyth. In 1954, he was charged by the Singapore government to administer the new national service scheme, and on the first day of it coming into force on 6 April 1954, 1,225 mostly Malay men registered for national service. In December 1954, he reported that the government had refused permission for P.V.Sharma to return to Singapore. Formerly General Secretary of the Singapore Teachers' Union, Sharma had been detained in Singapore for over two years under the Emergency Regulations and was living in India, having been released on the condition that he did not return to the Colony.

In 1955, Davis was appointed Permanent Secretary to the Ministry of Communications and Works, Singapore. In 1957, he was given notice of dismissal under the Malayanisation programme, and was offered an appointment as Deputy President of Singapore City Council, which he declined. The following year he became the Special Representative of the Rubber Growers’ Association in Malaya, remaining in the role until 1963.

== Personal life and death ==
Davis married Judith Corney in 1950 and they had one son and two daughters. He was a keen sportsman, playing tennis, cricket and golf, and at Cambridge, played hockey for Trinity College.

Davis died on 16 June 2003, aged 94.

== Honours ==
Davis was appointed Companion of the Order of St Michael and St George (CMG) in the 1957 Birthday Honours.
