= List of administrators of British Brunei =

British Resident in Brunei
- Residen British di Brunei ريسيدن بريتيش د بروني
- Royal Arms of His Majesty's Government
- Colonial Office
- Style: The Honourable (Malay: Yang Berhormat)
- Type: Resident Minister
- Member of: State Council
- Residence: Bubungan Dua Belas; Brunei Town
- Appointer: The Crown
- Term length: At Her Majesty's pleasure
- Precursor: Consulates-General
- Formation: January 1906
- First holder: Malcolm McArthur
- Final holder: Dennis White
- Abolished: 29 September 1959
- Succession: High Commissioner

This is a list of administrators of the British protectorate of Brunei.

== History ==
Brunei became a British protectorate in 1888, and in 1906 a British resident was given administrative authority. The sultan was obliged to follow his advice. Despite having a foreign government, Brunei's importance started to rise again in 1929 when petroleum production began. In place of Malay customs, traditions, and Islam, the British administration designated a British Resident to serve as the sultan's advisor in all other affairs. A formal constitution was formed by the 1959 Agreement, giving Brunei internal autonomy.

By the end of 1905, Brunei had been reduced to just two tiny, independent enclaves in Sarawak, covering a total area of 5.765 square metres (62.05 sq ft). In fact, had it not been for the British Government's reluctant intervention at this point, James Brooke would have completely engulfed the Sultanate. In order to preserve the monarchy, Sultan Hashim requested British assistance in the internal administration of his nation. He agreed to receive a British officer, to be called the Resident, who opinions were to be received and acted upon on all matters under the Anglo-Brunei Treaty of 1905–1906. Until 1959, successive Residents, who had originally been seconded from the Malayan Civil Service, were in charge of running Brunei.

== List of administrators ==
No.	Name	Years
Consuls General to Brunei
1	James Brooke	1846–1856
2	Spenser St. John	1856–1863
British Consuls in Brunei
1	Noel Penrose Trevenen	1890–1898
2	Arthur Louis Keyser	1898–1900
3	Godfrey Hewett	1900–1904
4	Malcolm Stewart Hannibal McArthur	1904–1905
British Residents in Brunei
1	Malcolm Stewart Hannibal McArthur	Jan 1906– May 1907
2	Harvey Chevallier	May 1907–Dec 1907
(1)	Malcolm Stewart Hannibal McArthur	Dec 1907– Apr 1908
3	John Fortescue Owen	Apr 1908– Sep 1909
(2)	Harvey Chevallier	Nov 1909– Nov 1913
4	Francis William Douglas	Nov 1913– Jan 1915
5	Ernest Barton Maundrell	Feb 1915– May 1916
6	Geoffrey Cator	Jun 1916– Mar 1921
7	Lucien Allen Arthur	Mar 1921– Jan 1923
8	Eric Ernest Falk Pretty	Jan 1923– Mar 1926
9	Oswald Eric Venables	Mar 1926– May 1927
(8)	Eric Ernest Falk Pretty	1927–1928
10	Patrick Alexander Bruce McKerron	May 1928– Sep 1931
11	Thomas Falkland Carey	Sep 1931– Oct 1934
12	Roland Evelyn Turnbull	Nov 1934– Jan 1937
13	John Graham Black	Jan 1937– Dec 1940
14	Ernest Edgar Pengilly	Jan 1940– Dec 1942
Japanese occupation of Brunei (1942-1945)
15	William John Peel	Jul 1946– Jan 1948
16	Leslie Harold Newsom Davis	Jan 1948– Aug 1948
(8)	Eric Ernest Falk Pretty	Aug 1948– Jun 1951
17	John Coleraine Hanbury Barcroft	Jul 1951– Jun 1954
18	John Orman Gilbert	Jun 1954– Jul 1958
19	Dennis Charles White	Jul 1958– Sep 1959

== See also ==
- History of Brunei
- List of high commissioners of the United Kingdom to Brunei
- Report On Brunei
