= John Orman Gilbert =

British resident minister

The Honourable Major John Gilbert CMG
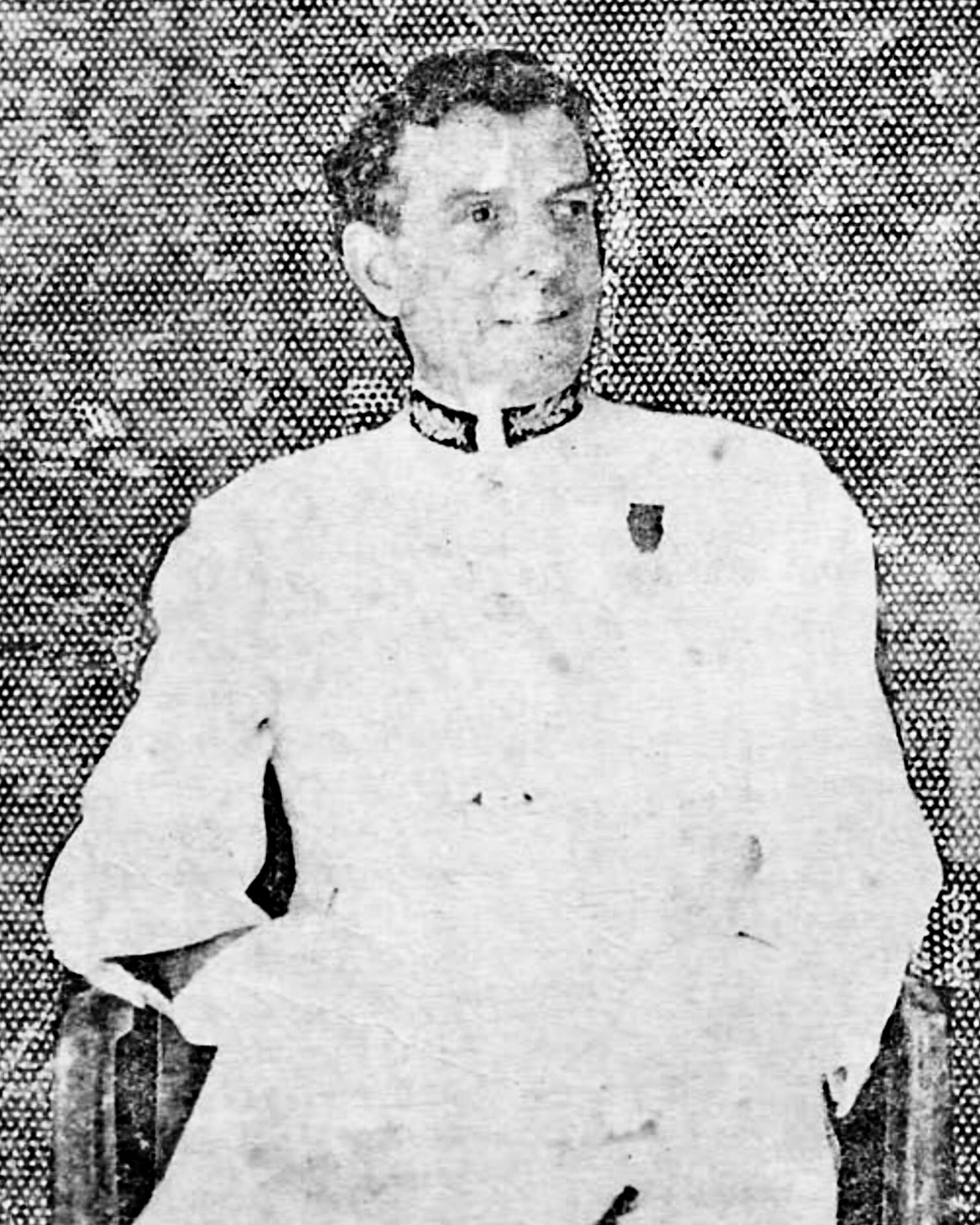
- John Gilbert in 1958

18th British Resident to Brunei
- In office June 1953 – July 1958
- Monarch: Elizabeth II
- Preceded by: John Coleraine Hanbury
- Succeeded by: Dennis White

Personal details
- Born: 21 October 1907 London, England
- Died: 1995 (aged 88–89)
- Occupation: Diplomat

Military service
- Allegiance: United Kingdom
- Branch/service: British Army
- Years of service: 1942–1946
- Rank: Major
- Battles/wars: World War II

Major John Orman Gilbert CMG (21 October 1907 – 1995), sometimes referred to as Tuan J.O. Gilbert, was a resident minister and formerly the British Resident to Brunei.

== Biography ==
Gilbert born in London, England on 21 October 1907, and was educated at Felsted and Pembroke College. In 1928, he began serving in Sarawak and then became a district officer in 1938, and would later signed up for military service from 1942 until 1946, during the World War II. Although some records listed him as serving a year earlier in June 1953. Since 1954, he held the position of British Resident to Brunei. On 20 October 1955, he passed the No.S66 Chinese Marriages Enactment, The Chinese Marriages (Fees) Regulations. From 18 December 1955 until 11 January 1956, Eric Raymond Bevington served as acting British Resident while Gilbert was on leave. Once again in June 1956, Dennis White became the acting Resident to Brunei during Gilbert's vacation back to the United Kingdom.

In January 1957, Gilbert had to be flown to Seria twice in order assist the Brunei Police Force in diffusing the ongoing strike carried out by British Malayan Petroleum (BSP) Chinese workers imported from Hong Kong. The strike began after a fight occurred between the local Malays and the Chinese imports, which claimed the life of one Chinese worker. During a discussion together with the Brunei Legislative Council, he affirmed that Gadong was exclusively for the Kampong Ayer residents, whom like to relocate to a new area. Additionally, similar projects would also be carried out if the relocation was successful. He attended the opening ceremony of the country's first Automatic Telephone Office on 5 October 1957.

On 15 February 1958, he gifted three books to the public, which were; Skin and Bones, Storm and Echo and The Foolish Gentlewomen, which was well received. Later on 6 April, John Gilbert and Jaya Rajid located the body of the murderer Peter Govilon. He had committed suicide in his bedroom after a killing spree that claimed the life of 6 victims at Kampong Padang Baru. Gilbert would be succeeded by Dennis White later that year, and thus he gave a farewell speech to the people of Brunei in hopes of returning to the country in the future. The speech was made at a farewell banquet for him and his family, sponsored by the Government of Brunei, which took place on 9 July, at the Brunei Sport Club in Brunei Town.

Gilbert died in South Africa in 1995.

== Honours ==
Gilbert was bestowed the Order of St Michael and St George (CMG) by Queen Elizabeth II during the 1958 New Year Honours on 12 July. In 1963, Sultan Omar Ali Saifuddien III awarded him the Omar Ali Saifuddin Medal (POAS). British Residents in Brunei including John Gilbert were given the honorary title of Yang Berhormat (The Honourable).

=== National ===
- Order of St Michael and St George Companion (CMG) – (12 July 1958)

=== Foreign ===
- Brunei:
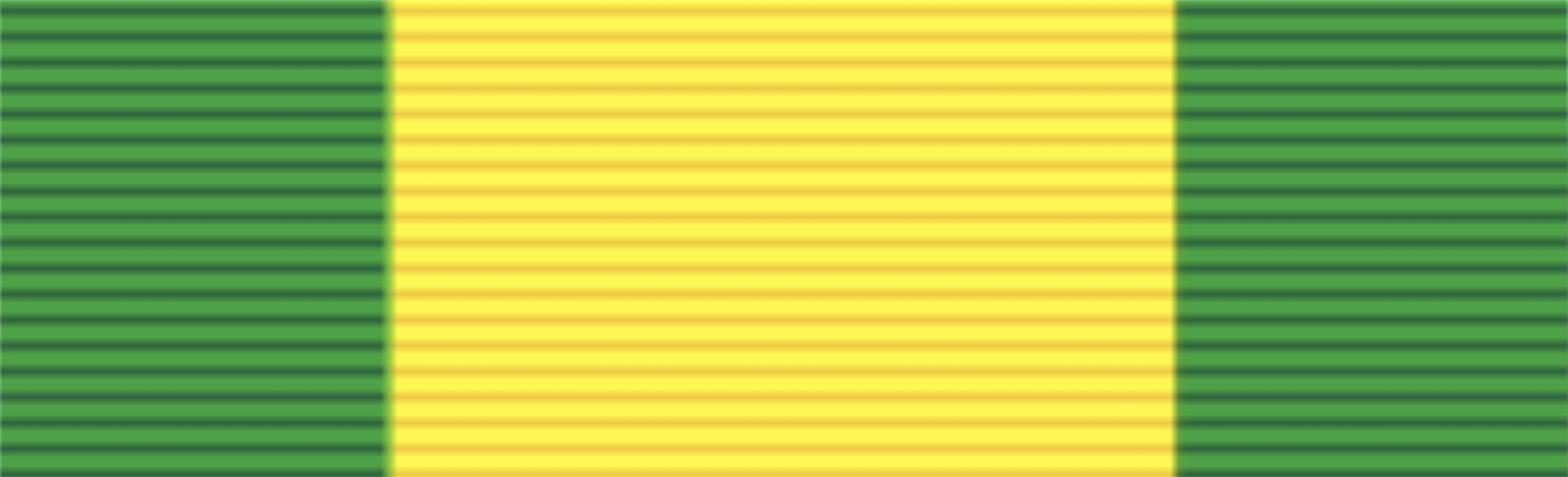
  - Omar Ali Saifuddin Medal (POAS) – (1953)

Diplomatic posts
Preceded by John Coleraine Hanbury	British Resident to Brunei; June 1959 – July 1963	Succeeded by Dennis White
