= Eric Ernest Falk Pretty =

British resident minister (1891–1967)

Dato Setia Eric Ernest Falk Pretty DSNB CMG POAS
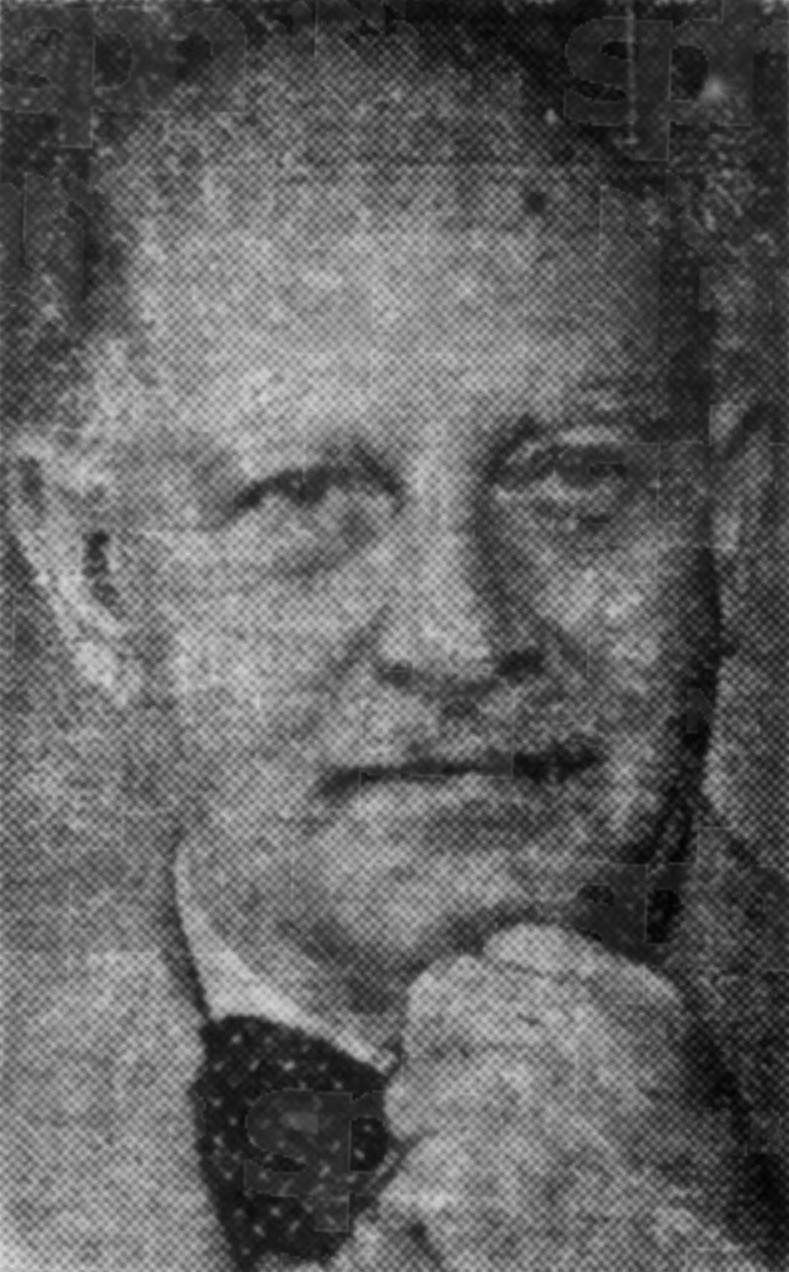
- Pretty in 1951

8th British Resident to Brunei
- In office 1948–1951
- Monarchs: George V George VI
- Preceded by: Leslie Davis
- Succeeded by: John Barcroft
- In office 1927–1928
- Preceded by: Lucien Allen Arthur
- Succeeded by: Patrick McKerron
- In office March 1923 – 1926
- Preceded by: Oswald Eric Venables
- Succeeded by: Oswald Eric Venables

Personal details
- Born: 1891
- Died: June 1967 (aged 75–76)
- Spouse: Merrall Bough-Hissey (m. 1935)
- Education: Harrow School; Magdalen College, Oxford
- Occupation: Colonial administrator

Military service
- Allegiance: United Kingdom
- Branch/service: British Army
- Years of service: 1918–1920
- Rank: Second lieutenant
- Unit: Johore Volunteer Rifles

Eric Ernest Falk Pretty (1891 – June 1967) was a British colonial administrator who served as British Resident to Brunei during three separate terms: from 1923 to 1926, 1927 to 1928, and again from 1948 to 1951.

== Early life and education ==
Pretty was born in 1891 as the second son of Herbert Pretty of Elmhurst, Reading, Berkshire. He received his education at Harrow School and later attended Magdalen College in 1909.

== Career ==
Pretty began his colonial service career as a cadet in the Straits Settlements under the Colonial Office in November 1914. He passed his final examinations in the Malay language in January 1916, a key requirement for administrative postings in British Malaya. By September 1917, he was appointed collector of land revenue in Johore Bahru. Following the First World War, he served briefly in the military as a second lieutenant and assistant adjutant with the Johore Volunteer Rifles in May 1918. His civil service career progressed steadily: in June 1920, he was made assistant adviser in Endau, Johore, and was promoted to officer in November 1921 and to assistant secretary "B" in February 1922. Just two months later, he was transferred to serve as private secretary in the Office of the Attorney General.

Pretty first served as British Resident to Brunei from March 1923 to 1926, and then again from 1927 to 1928. During his initial term, he proposed sending the young Sultan Ahmad Tajuddin to England for education, with the goal of exposing him to Western civilisation and improving his English proficiency. However, this plan was unexpectedly blocked at the last minute by the Sultan's mother, who refused to allow him to leave the state. Despite this, the Sultan eventually spent a year in England in 1932, becoming the first Brunei monarch to travel to the West.

Pretty was then promoted to class III officer and appointed district officer of Krian in June 1928. In December 1930, he was commissioner of lands and mines for Trengganu, and secretary to the high commissioner from July 1931 to 1937. During this time in October 1933, Pretty, who held a Class IB appointment in the Malayan Civil Service as Acting Secretary to the High Commissioner before going on leave, was fined £20 for negligent driving near Reading, which resulted in the death of a motorcyclist, according to The Straits Times' London correspondent.

Pretty was sent to Brunei in 1936 to resolve the tensions between the Sultan and the British government. The Sultan, who was becoming more aggressive, had been in dispute with the British Resident on issues of finance. Although British policy claimed to enhance the prestige of the Sultan, officials found themselves rejecting his schemes as impractical and regarding him as a nuisance. Pretty's role was to smooth over the tension and balance the diplomatic situation. He subsequently became undersecretary to the government of the Federated Malay States (FMS) in April 1937. Later, Pretty succeeded C. A. Vlieland as Financial Commissioner of Johore, a position for which he was well suited, having previously served as Johore's Commissioner of Lands and Mines. He also became a member of the Johore Council of State, with his affirmation scheduled for 25 January 1938. In September 1940, Pretty, an officer of Class IB in the Malayan Civil Service, was appointed to act as undersecretary to the Government of the FMS, Class IA.

Pretty, who was preparing to retire as British adviser in Johore after 33 years of service in Malaya, was scheduled to return in the summer as a pensioner to serve as British Resident to Brunei following a leave in Britain. Although he had retired at the age of fifty-seven, he was reappointed as resident to Brunei for the third time. In August 1948, for the third time, he was appointed resident minister to Brunei. His reappointment at the age of fifty-seven was the British government's belated recognition of the strategic significance of Brunei. He was particularly sympathetic to the Sultan's attempts to maintain royal dignity and felt that the new wealth of Brunei ought to be used for the benefit of its people first. Pretty was sympathetic to the Sultan's requests for improved royal living conditions and assisted in arranging discussions between the Sultan and the British government, even going so far as to express disappointment that the Sultan did not survive to occupy the new palace that was eventually built.

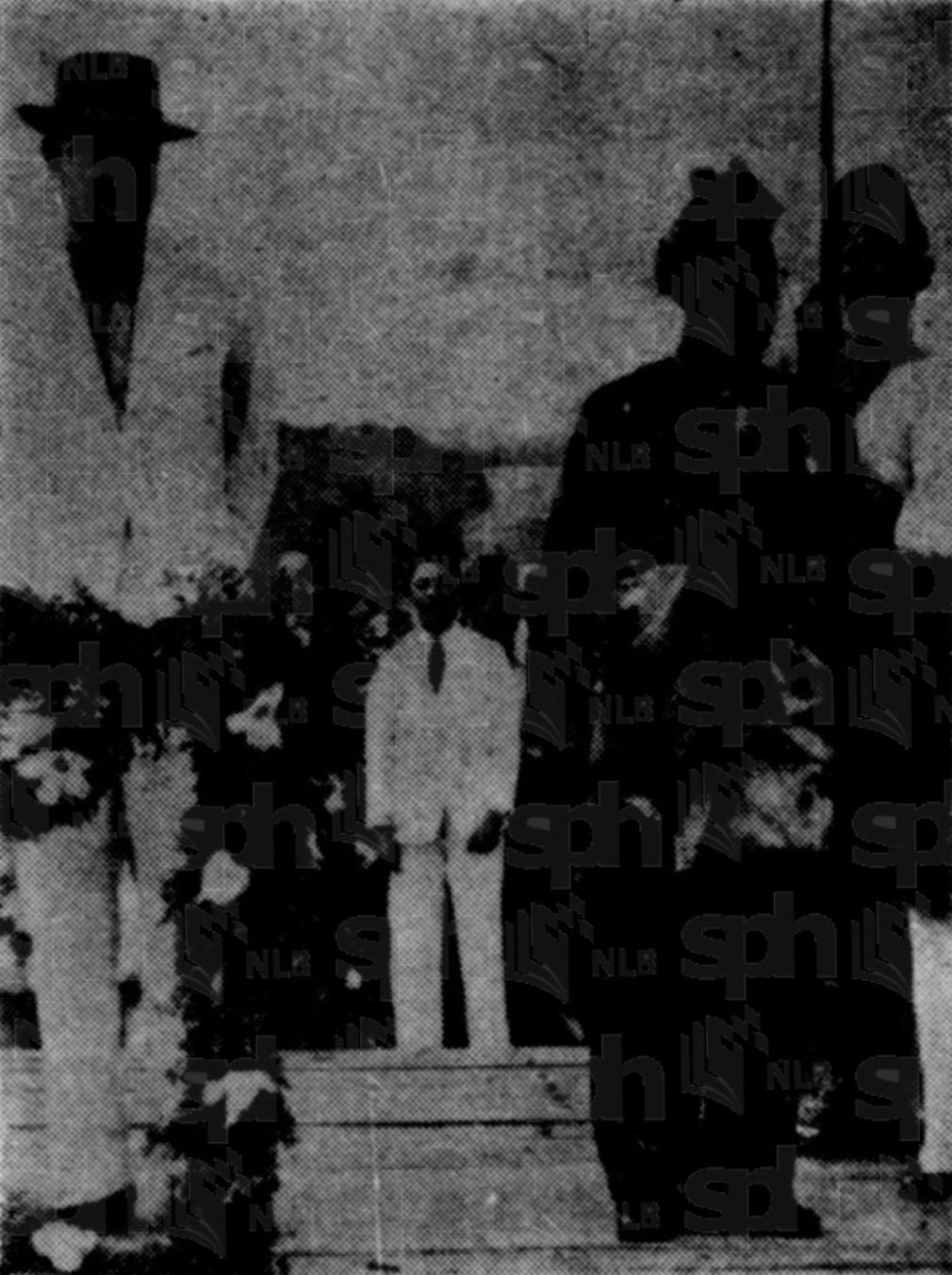
Omar Ali Saifuddien III watching a celebration of his birthday, accompanied on his left by Pretty, on 29 September 1950

Pretty played a central role in Brunei's development planning around the start of the 1950s. In a memorandum dated 9 December 1949, he detailed ambitious public works projects included in the 1950 budget estimates, such as the construction of a new palace for Sultan Omar Ali Saifuddien III, a hospital, a school in Brunei Town, river reclamation works, and road reconstruction. These initiatives reflected his commitment to ensuring that Brunei's growing revenues were directed toward meaningful infrastructure improvements for the benefit of the nation.

Pretty also supported the Sultan's plan to visit England after returning from the hajj pilgrimage, despite opposition from Resident John Barcroft, who wanted to postpone the trip for financial reasons. Having promised as much, Pretty was as good as his word, adopting a more considerate and deferential attitude towards the Sultan's wishes. Conventionally, Bruneian rulers had very limited scope for personal contact with British officials, and visits to England were not encouraged. It wasn't until Sultan Ahmad Tajuddin took the bold step of telegramming King George VI that he was finally permitted to go to England in June 1950. This momentous decision came during Pretty's second term as Resident, and his friendly and sympathetic approach likely facilitated it, possibly in conjunction with the intervention of the Sultan's adviser, Gerard MacBryan.

In mid-1950, he proposed that the principal Wazirs, Pengiran Muda Hashim and Pengiran Anak Mohamed Alam, be provided with furnished government quarters, similar to those allocated to senior European officers in Brunei's administration. This marked a shift towards recognising the importance of local authority figures. However, after Pretty's tenure, his successor Barcroft was less accommodating. Upon insistence of the Wazirs that there should be alterations in building designs, Barcroft declined on financial grounds, triggering tensions between the British administration and the traditional elite.

In early 1951, Pretty actively sought to prevent A. M. Azahari's return to Brunei due to concerns about his radical background and involvement in Indonesia's anti-colonial struggle. Aware of Azahari's potential to incite anti-Western sentiment among the Bruneian population, Pretty even approached Azahari's uncle, Pengiran Mohammad, to discourage his return. Even when leaving the choice to the Sultan in the end, Pretty acted cautiously in maintaining political stability in Brunei. On 6 July 1951, on the eve of retiring after 37 years' service in Malaya and Borneo, Pretty told The Straits Times that Brunei was struggling to find suitably qualified individuals to help its development; he was planning to travel to England later in the month but wanted to return to Malaya in the near future. In 1957, he became an agent of the Brunei government in the United Kingdom.

== Later life and death ==
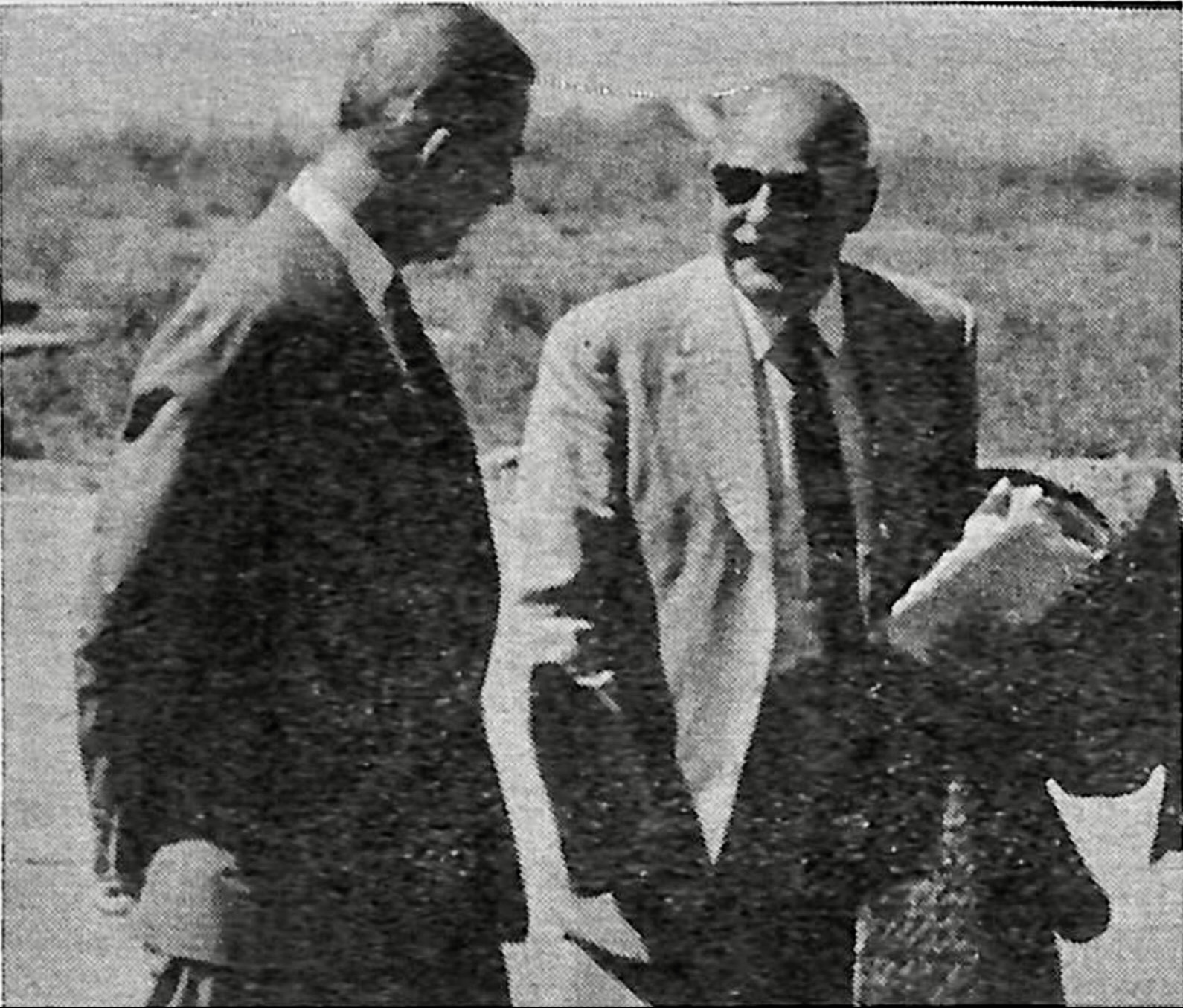
Fernley Webber and Pretty during the latter's visit to Berakas Airport in 1966

On 8 March 1966, Pretty arrived at Berakas Airport on a month-and-half leave of holiday in Brunei with his wife. He was then 75 years old and serving in the Brunei government. He appreciated Bruneian students in the United Kingdom as being good-natured and enthusiastic. Reflecting on his early years in the country, he stated that the government in the 1920s was not ideal, and there must be improvement in small steps. He lived in Istana Edinburgh and organised journeys to various parts of the country. In a Pelita Brunei interview, he further stated:

These people already possess good houses and government officials are dominated mostly by locals. But in 1924, I and some local people worked together constructing a road from Brunei (Brunei–Muara) to Tutong. But this time I couldn't help but be amazed when I travel along that road which has been repaired so well.

— Eric Ernest Falk Pretty

Pretty died in June 1967. After his death, his position as Brunei's representative in the United Kingdom was succeeded by Dennis White, who was based at 101 Grand Building, Trafalgar Square.

== Personal life ==
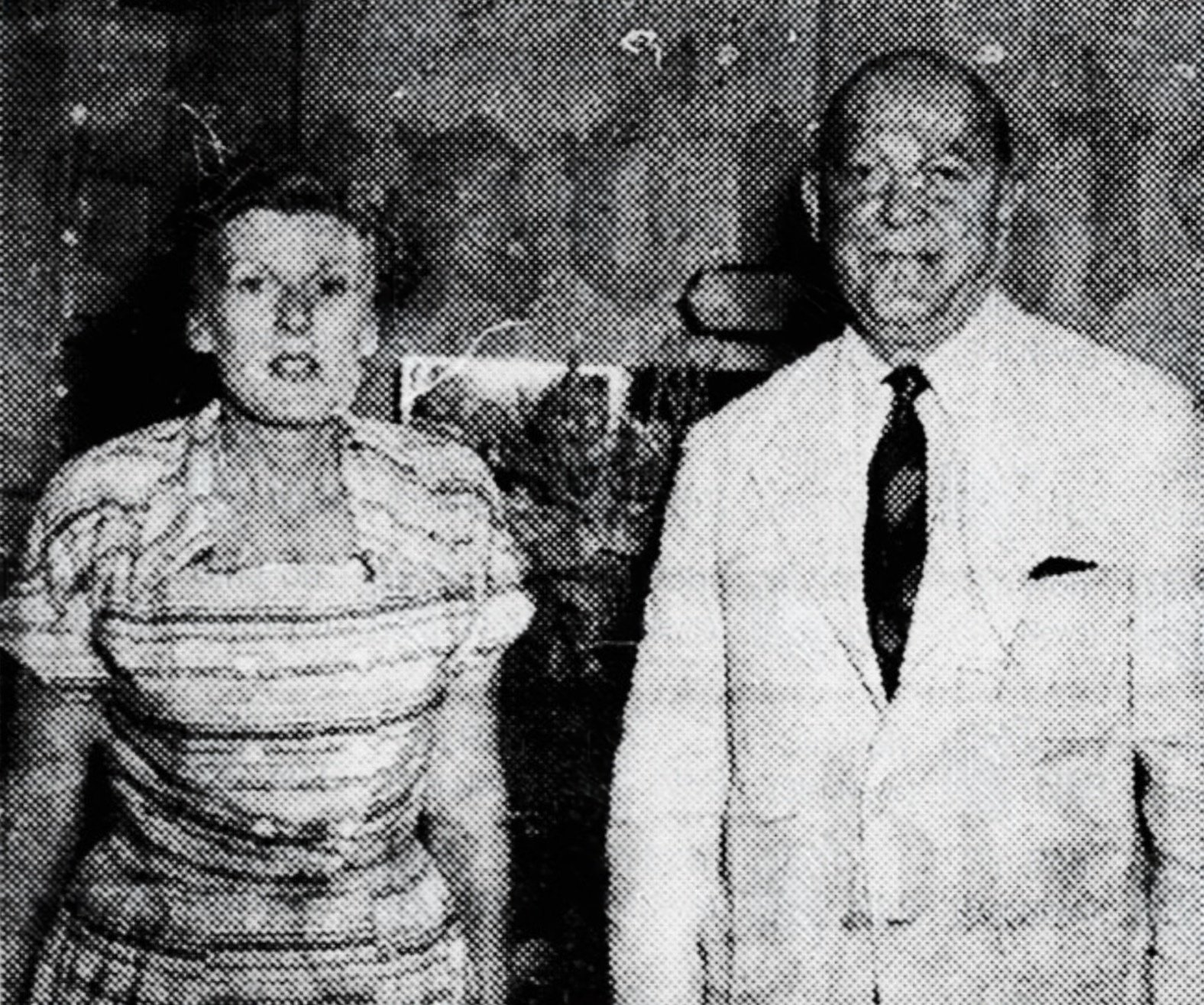
Pretty and Bough-Hissey in 1951

Pretty became engaged to Merrall Josephine Bough-Hissey in October 1933 and the couple married in July 1935 at St Margaret's, Westminster. Merrall's stepfather was the actor Franklin Dyall. On 11 October 1935, she gave birth to their first daughter at the Maternity Hospital in Singapore. They later had another daughter, Cynthia Valerie Mary Pretty, born on 24 July 1941, who married George Canning, 5th Baron Garvagh, in 1974.

Beyond his official duties, Pretty enjoyed sports and recreational pursuits. In December 1928, he won the Caledonian Club's annual 30-hole stroke-play Golf Championship for the Ramsden Plate with a score of 161, ahead of runner-up F. C. Vanrenen. He also competed in the Malayan billiards championship; on 13 May 1932, representing the Singapore Club, he defeated Tan Bock Lim of the Clerical Union 250–194, making the tournament's highest break at that stage.

== Legacy ==
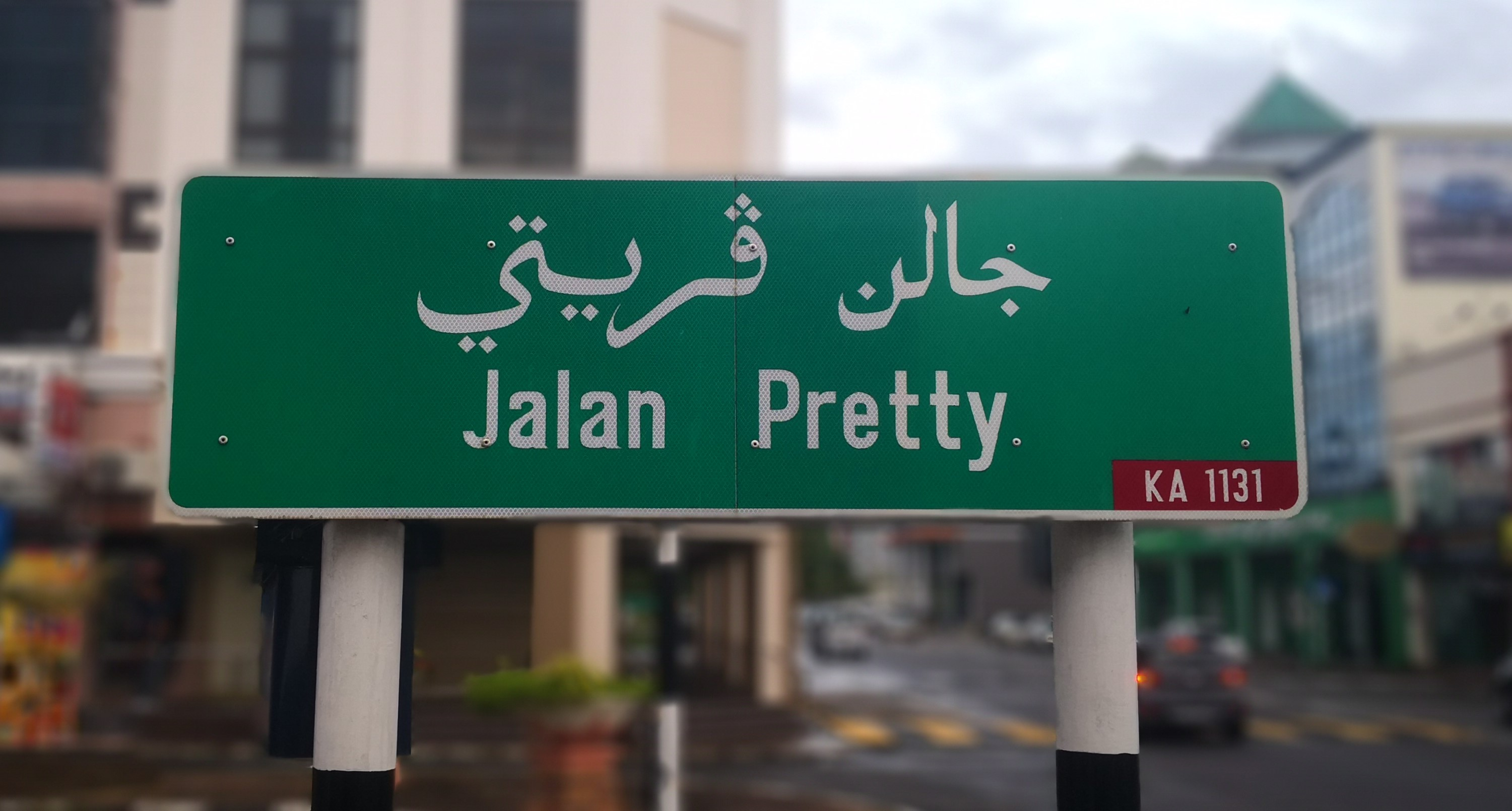
Jalan Pretty, Kuala Belait in 2018

=== Honours ===
National

- Order of St Michael and St George Companion (CMG; 1951)

Foreign

- Brunei:
  - Order of Setia Negara Brunei Second Class (DSNB; 1962) – Dato Setia
  - Omar Ali Saifuddin Medal First Class (POAS; 23 September 1962)
  - Omar Ali Saifuddin Coronation Medal (31 May 1951)

=== Things named after him ===
- Jalan Pretty, a road in Bandar Seri Begawan.
- Jalan Pretty, a road in Kuala Belait.
- A customs launch named after Pretty was christened by his spouse at Thornycroft shipyards, Tanjong Rhu.

Diplomatic posts
Preceded by Leslie Davis; Lucien Allen Arthur; Oswald Eric Venables	British Resident to Brunei; 1948 – 1951; 1927 – 1928; March 1923 – 1926	Succeeded by John Barcroft; Patrick McKerron; Oswald Eric Venables
