= Bryan Audley St John Hepburn =

British colonial administrator (1911–1991)

Bryan Audley Hepburn CMG
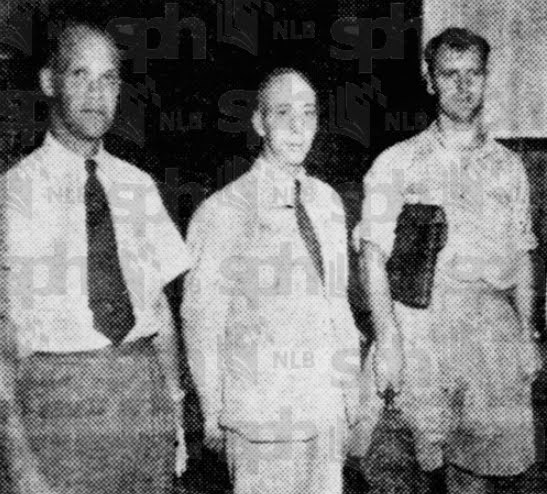
- Hepburn (left) with government officials in 1951

Financial Secretary of Sarawak
- In office 1958–1964
- Preceded by: John Barcroft
- Succeeded by: John Pike

Personal details
- Born: 24 February 1911 Jamaica
- Died: 30 May 1991 (aged 80)
- Children: 2
- Occupation: Colonial administrator

Bryan Audley St John Hepburn CMG (24 February 1911 – 30 May 1991) was a British colonial administrator. He was Financial Secretary of Sarawak from 1958 to 1963.

== Early life and education ==
Hepburn was born on 24 February 1911 in Jamaica, West Indies, the son of A.F. St John Hepburn. He was educated at Cornwall College, Jamaica.

== Career ==
=== Jamaica ===
Hepburn joined the colonial service in Jamaica in 1930 where he proceeded to hold various posts in the Secretariat, the Revenue Department and other departments, and rose to Assistant Secretary in 1944.

=== Financial Secretary of Sarawak ===
After World War II Hepburn joined the colonial service in Sarawak. From 1958 to 1963 he served as Financial Secretary of Sarawak. He presented the government's annual budget to the Council Negri. He introduced import duties for the first time on many luxury goods to help meet the government's budget deficit, and oversaw the establishment of the Development Finance Corporation to promote economic growth.

Hepburn was a member of the Inter-Governmental Committee established in 1962 which reviewed and reported on the proposed constitutional and legal framework for Sabah and Sarawak's integration into Malaysia. Its findings, together with the Cobbold Commission's report, formed the basis for the Malaysia Agreement which led to the establishment of Federation of Malaysia.

Hepburn served as a member of the Sarawak Legislative and Executive Councils from 1955 to 1963. He also served in a variety of other positions including: Development Secretary (1951–1954) when he prepared the $100 million development plan for Sarawak; Chairman of Sarawak Development Finance Corporation (1958–1963); member of the Board of Commissioners of Currency; Chairman of Sarawak Electricity Supply Co Ltd (1955–1963); Director of Malayan Airways Ltd (1959–1963); Director of Borneo Airways Ltd (1958–1963); Deputy Chairman of Malaysian Tariff Advisory Board (1963–1965), and with the Ministry of Overseas Development (1966–1973).

Hepburn wrote The Sarawak Handbook, Comprising Historical, Statistical and General Information Concerning the Colony (1949).

== Personal life and death ==
Hepburn married Sybil Isabel Myers in 1940 and they had two daughters.

Hepburn died on 30 May 1991, aged 80.

== Honours ==
- United Kingdom
  - Companion of the Order of St Michael and St George (CMG) (1962)
