= Patrick McKerron =

British Army officer and administrator (1896 – 1964)

Brigadier Sir Patrick McKerron KBE CMG
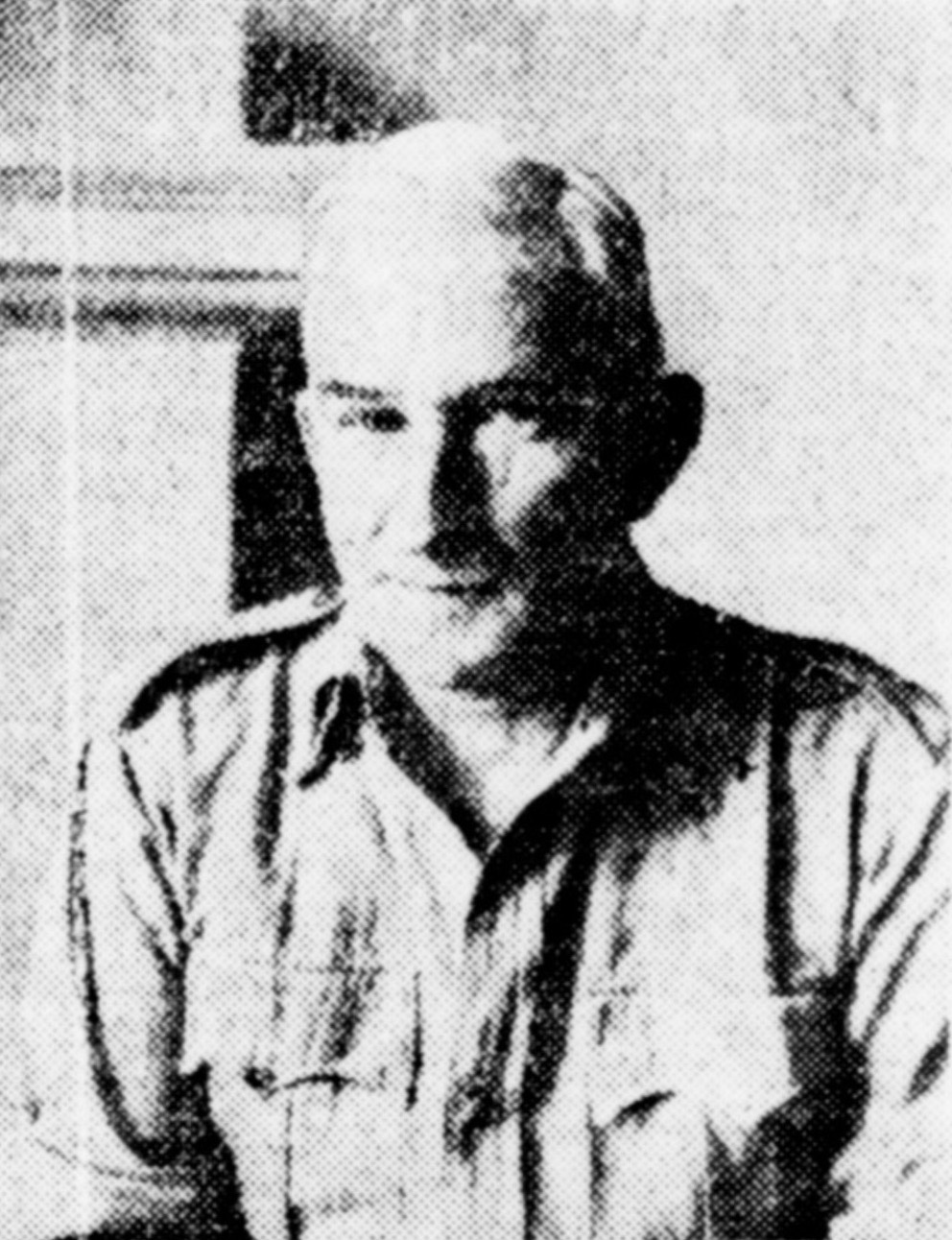
- McKerron, c. 1947

1st Colonial Secretary of Singapore
- In office 1 April 1946 – 29 April 1950
- Monarch: George VI
- Governor: Franklin Gimson
- Preceded by: Office established
- Succeeded by: Wilfred Lawson Blythe

10th British Resident to Brunei
- In office 1928–1931
- Monarch: George V
- Preceded by: Eric Pretty
- Succeeded by: Thomas Carey

Personal details
- Born: 6 May 1896 Aberdeen, Scotland, United Kingdom
- Died: 20 March 1964 (aged 67) London, United Kingdom
- Spouse(s): Ernestine Bickford Pearce (m. 1924) Majorie Mennedy Rettie (m. 1933)
- Parent: R.G. McKerron (father)
- Education: Fettes College
- Alma mater: Aberdeen University
- Occupation: Army officer and colonial administrator

Military service
- Branch/service: British Army
- Years of service: 1914–1919; 1942–1946
- Rank: Brigadier
- Unit: Gordon Highlanders; 20th Punjab Infantry
- Battles/wars: World War I World War II

Brigadier Sir Patrick Alexander Bruce McKerron (6 May 1896 – 20 March 1964) was a British military officer and colonial administrator who served as the British resident to Brunei from 1928 to 1931 and later became the first Colonial Secretary of Singapore, holding the post from 1946 to 1950.

== Early life and education ==
McKerron born on 6 May 1896, son of Professor R. G. McKerron. He was educated in Fettes College and Aberdeen University.

== Career ==
During the First World War, McKerron was with the 4th Battalion, The Gordon Highlanders in France, where he was wounded in 1917. He was transferred to Indian Army servicing with the 20th Punjab Regiment in the Punjab and on the North West Frontier.

McKerron joined the Malayan Civil Service in 1920 was appointed as acting assistant superintendent in the Monopolies Department (Singapore). Between 1922 and 1924, he was a district officer in Jasin, Malacca. In January 1925, he was appointed as district officer (Nibong Tebal), assistant district judge (Singapore and Penang) and police magistrate (Penang). In 1928, he was the British Resident to Brunei. In 1932, he was the secretary of Federated Malay States Retrenchment Committee and in the following year, he appointed Superintendent of Taiping Convict Establishment. Between 1934 and 1936, he was the assistant adviser (Kedah and Trengganu) and superintendent of prison of Kedah. In 1938, he was the undersecretary in Straits Settlements and first assistant secretary.

In February 1939, McKerron was in charge of the Manpower Bureau for voluntary service for Malaya. It was an appeal for British Europeans to enrol in the volunteer force in the event of emergency (Second World War). The objective of the registration is avoid the tragic mistakes of the First World War when thousands of men enlisted and went to the front who would have been of far greater value to the country in their civil posts. By mid-April, about 2500 British Europeans enrolled for the voluntary service. McKerron was later appointed as press censor in September 1939.

In 1940, McKerron was appointed as member of the advisory committee on the formation and organisation of Defence Corps in Singapore. This was partly due to McKerron was an army officer prior to his civil career.

During the period of British Military Administration in Malaya in 1945–1946, Brigadier McKerron was the Deputy Chief Civil Affairs Officer in Singapore, assisting Major-General Sir Ralph Hone (Chief Civil Affair Officer of Malaya).

After the British Military Administration ended on 31 March 1946, McKerron was sworn in as the 1st Colonial Secretary of Singapore on the following day. During his tenure as colonial secretary, McKerron was sworn in as Officer Administrating the Government when Sir Franklin Gimson (Governor of Singapore) was away in England for a period of 5 months in 1947. He retired on 29 April 1950 as colonial secretary and handed over to J D M Smith, whom became the acting colonial secretary. Wilfred Lawson Blythe was later sworn in as the 2nd Colonial Secretary of Singapore on 30 June.

McKerron was later the President of the Association of British Malaya in 1953.

== Personal life ==
Patrick McKerron was born in Aberdeen, Scotland, United Kingdom on 6 May 1896. He is the eldest son of Professor and Mrs R. G. McKerron.

McKerron's first marriage was with Ernestine Bickford Pearce, daughter of Mr and Mrs Ernest V Pearce of Baxterley, Nathan Road (Singapore) on 21 April 1924. McKerron's second marriage was with Majorie Mennedy Rettie, youngest daughter of Mr and Mrs A T Rettie of Spring Valley, Badulla, Ceylon on 29 April 1933.

McKerron has a son (Colin) and a daughter (Jane) from his marriage.

McKerron died in London on 20 March 1964.

== Legacy ==
=== Honours ===
McKerron was invested with Companion of the Most Distinguished Order of St. Michael and St. George (CMG) in 1945 in recognition of his work in the Malayan Planning Unit during the war in Malaya. He was also awarded a mention in dispatches on 26 June 1947, in recognition of his services in the Dutch East Indies. In 1950, he received Knight Commander of the Most Excellent Order of the British Empire (KBE) for his 30 years of service in Malayan Civil Service.

=== Things named after him ===
- A road in Kuala Belait has been named after him, Jalan McKerron.
- McKerron Football Shield, formerly an association football competition held in Brunei.

Government offices
New title	Colonial Secretary of Singapore; 1946-1950	Succeeded by J D M Smith (Acting); Wilfred Lawson Blythe
Diplomatic posts
Preceded by Eric Pretty	British Resident to Brunei; 1928–1931	Succeeded by Thomas Carey
