= Taib Besar =

Bruneian magistrate (1916–1974)

Dato Setia Taib Besar DSNB DSLJ DPMB MBE POAS PHBS PJK
- طائب بسر
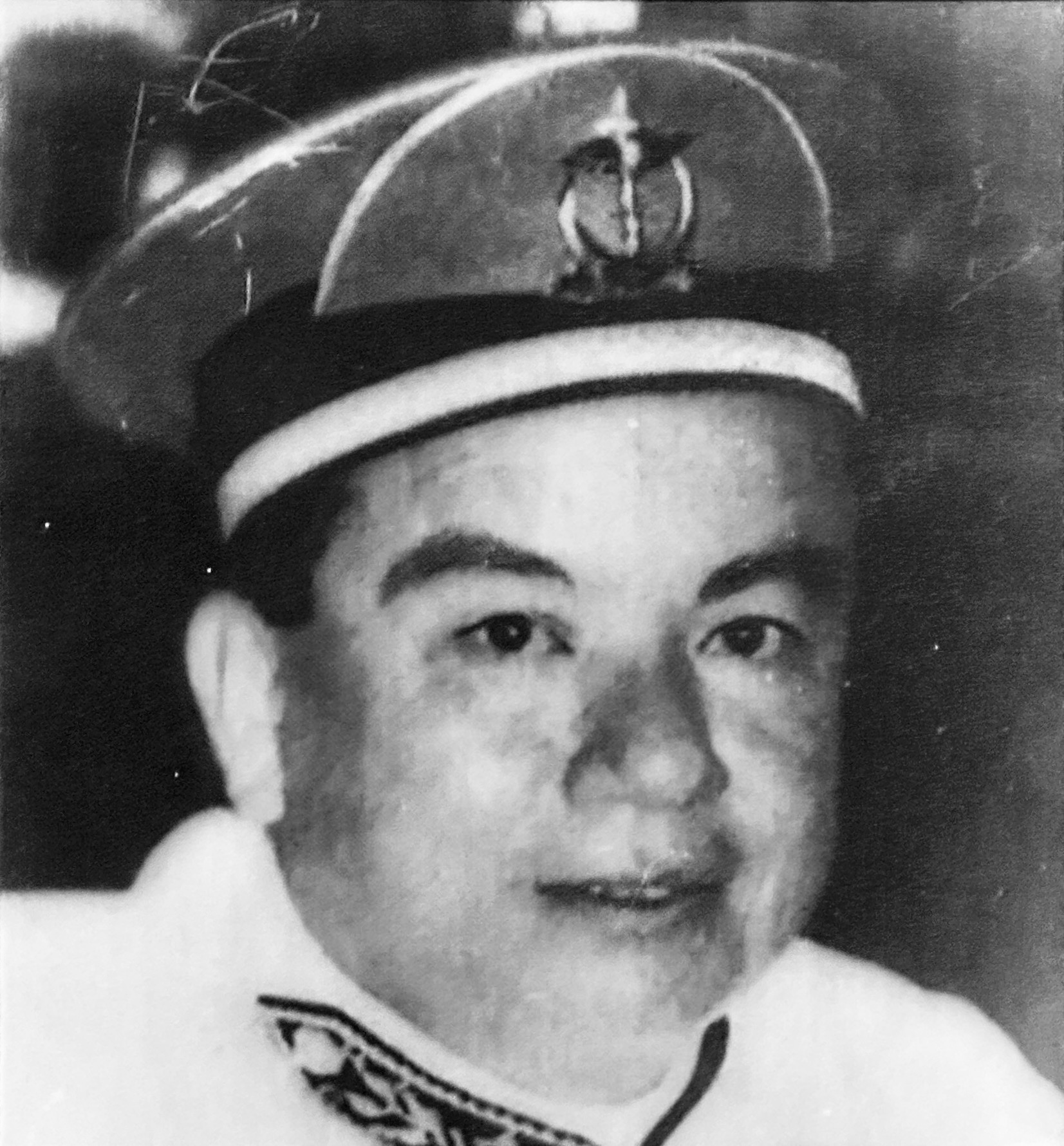
- Taib during the 1959 Bruneian Constitution signing

State Secretary of Brunei
- Acting
- In office 1 June 1967 – 25 March 1970
- Monarchs: Omar Ali Saifuddien III; Hassanal Bolkiah
- Preceded by: Pengiran Muhammad Yusuf
- Succeeded by: Pengiran Abdul Momin

Personal details
- Born: 1916 Crown Colony of Labuan
- Died: 22 January 1974 (aged 58) Mecca, Hejaz, Saudi Arabia
- Children: 2; including Abdul Rahman
- Profession: Magistrate; civil servant

Mohamed Taib bin Besar (1916 – 22 January 1974) was a Labuan-born magistrate and civil servant in the government of Brunei who took office as the State Secretary from 1967 to 1969, and Acting Land Commissioner from 1961 to 1962. Additionally, he was a member of the Council of Ministers and Legislative Council.

== Early life and career ==
Mohamed Taib bin Besar was born in 1916, and studied at an English school in Labuan. He began his career in the government of Brunei as a clerk at the British Resident's Office in October 1934 and transferred to the Public Works Department (PWD) in January 1935. On 1 May 1935, he was moved to the Forestry Office in Kuala Belait. On 1 June 1940, he was promoted to the position of a state administrative officer and appointed as the Assistant Land Revenue Collector in Brunei Town's Lands Department. From 1 May 1941 to 16 November 1946, during the Japan's occupation of Brunei, he served as the Belait District Officer. He was then appointed Secretary to the Resident (SR) at the British Resident's Office until the 1959 Constitution of Brunei came into force on 29 September 1959, whereupon the British Residency was replaced by a High Commission. With the consent of Sultan Omar Ali Saifuddien III, he was appointed Magistrate (judge) Class I on 3 June 1958.

Taib then served as the clerk of the State Council (the present day Legislative Council) from October 1959 to 22 April 1962, and, from 10 December 1961 to 22 April 1962, he co-currently served as the Acting Land Commissioner under the Lands Department. He took office as the Assistant State Secretary on 18 January 1964 and left the PWD on 1 March 1964. In January 1965, he was appointed Government assistant, and, on 15 May, he officially opened the Short Course for Small School Teachers at the Brunei Malay Teachers' School. On behalf of Menteri Besar Marsal Maun, Taib launched the Brunei State Scout camp at Gadong Estate on 19 June 1965. In March 1966, he led a Bruneian delegation consisting of Pengiran Yusuf, Mohd Salleh and J. S. Gould to the Asian Conference for Children in Bangkok. Then, 29 July 1966, he officiated at the opening of Awang Haji Mohammad Yusof Katimahar Malay School.

On 1 June 1967, Taib was appointed as the successor to Pengiran Yusuf in the office of the State Secretary of Brunei. Despite announcing his retirement on 22 March 1969, he wasn't replaced until 25 March 1970. Upon his actual retirement on 23 July 1969, he had completed 36 years of service with the government and was temporarily succeeded by Acting State Secretary Pengiran Abdul Momin.

== Later life and death ==
Taib retired from civil service in 1970. He later became part of the Legislative Council on 14 October 1970, and the Council of Ministers on 25 August 1971, all positions he maintained until his passing. During his time in office, he represented Brunei at many international conferences and made great efforts to improve the public image of his country and its inter-ethnic citizenry. He was appointed as a member of the Public Service Commission on 15 March 1971, under a three-year contract. At the beginning of 1974, his contract was renewed for a second term, but he died shortly after.

Dato Taib, aged 58, died on 22 January 1974, in a hospital in Mecca shortly after completing the obligatory Hajj pilgrimage. He was one of nine Brunei pilgrims who died during the Hajj season that year. He left behind a widow and two children, his eldest son, Abdul Rahman, who was serving as a Senior Administrative Officer at the Office of the General Adviser to the Sultan of Brunei, as well as a daughter who was still attending school.

== Honours ==
=== Honours ===
For his service as the SR at the British Resident's Office in Brunei, Queen Elizabeth II awarded the then 42-year old Taib as a member of the Order of the British Empire (MBE) during the 1958 Queen's Birthday Honours. This was followed by the awarding of the Order of Setia Negara Brunei Third Class (SNB) by Sultan Omar Ali Saifuddien III in 1963. He has earned the following honours:

National

- Order of Paduka Seri Laila Jasa Second Class (DSLJ; 1968) – Dato Seri Laila Jasa
- Order of Setia Negara Brunei Second Class (DSNB; 15 July 1970) – Dato Setia
- Order of Setia Negara Brunei Third Class (SNB; 21 December 1963)
- Order of Seri Paduka Mahkota Brunei Second Class (DPMB; 15 August 1966) – Dato Paduka
- Omar Ali Saifuddin Medal (POAS)
- Sultan Hassanal Bolkiah Medal First Class (PHBS; 12 February 1969)
- Meritorious Service Medal (PJK; 23 September 1959)
- Omar Ali Saifuddin Coronation Medal (31 May 1951)

Foreign

- United Kingdom:
  - Member of the Order of the British Empire (MBE; 1958)

=== Things named after him ===
- Jalan Dato Mohd. Taib Road in Bandar Seri Begawan is named in his honor.

Political offices
Preceded by Pengiran Muhammad Yusuf	Acting State Secretary of Brunei; 1 June 1967 – 25 March 1970	Succeeded by Pengiran Abdul Momin
