= Matnor McAfee =

Bruneian administrative officer (1922–1973)

Dato Paduka Matnor McAfee DPMB SMB POAS PJK PKL
- متنور مچفياي
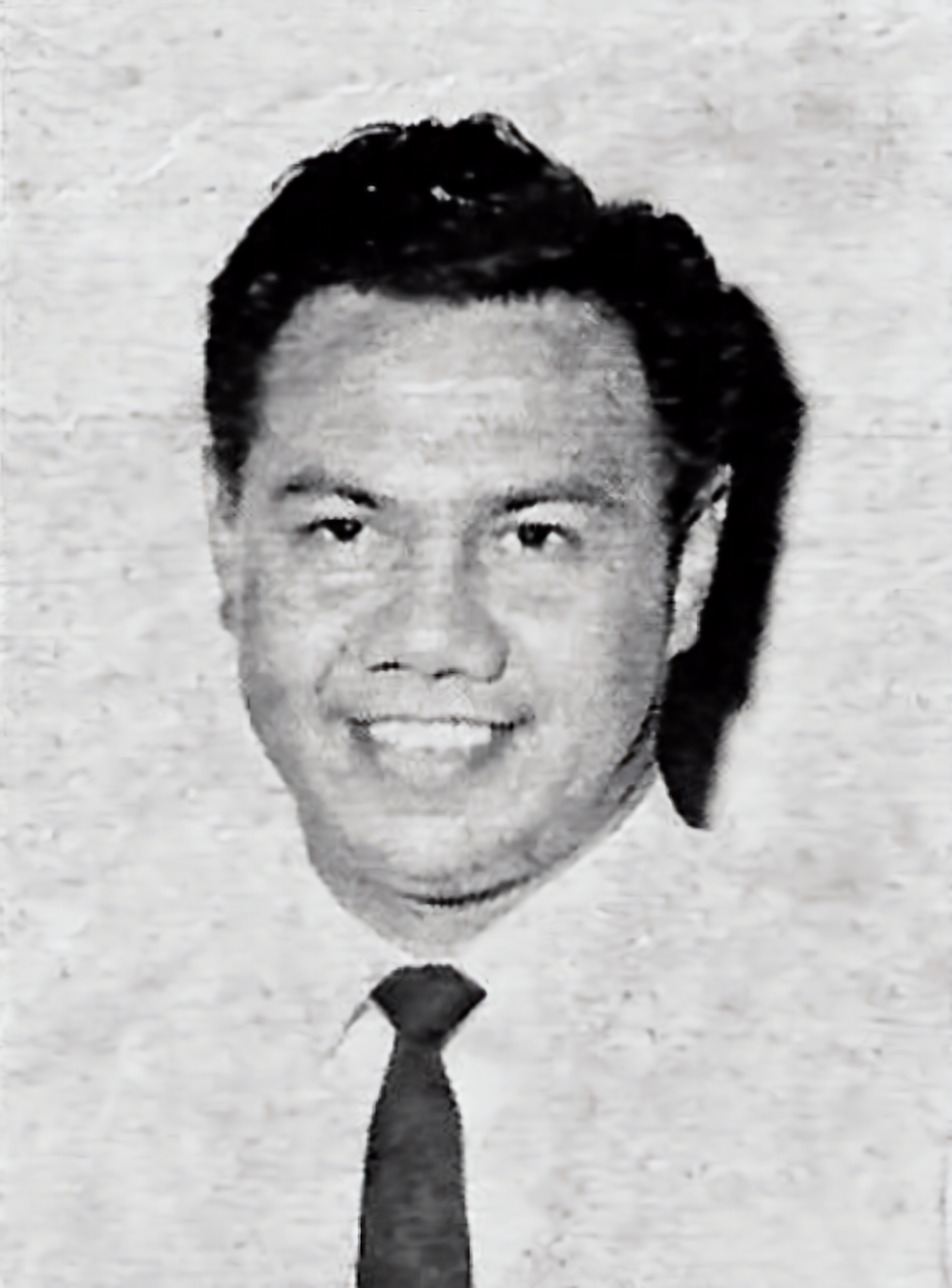
- McAfee, c. 1960

State Secretary of Brunei
- Acting
- In office 15 May 1972 – 15 February 1973
- Monarch: Hassanal Bolkiah
- Preceded by: Pengiran Abdul Momin
- Succeeded by: Abdul Aziz Umar

Personal details
- Born: Patrick G. McAfee; 30 September 1922 Crown Colony of Labuan
- Died: 15 February 1973 (aged 50) Brunei General Hospital, Bandar Seri Begawan, Brunei
- Resting place: Kianggeh Muslim Cemetery, Bandar Seri Begawan, Brunei
- Spouse: Fatimah Abdullah
- Profession: Administrative officer; civil servant

Matnor McAfee (Note: His name was spelled Mat Noor McAfee, according to the 1962 Brunei state-run newspaper Pelita Brunei.) (born Patrick G. McAfee; 30 September 1922 – 15 February 1973) was a Labuan-born administrative officer and civil servant in the Government of Brunei who formerly took office as the acting State Secretary from 1972 to 1973 and was a member of the Council of Ministers. He had a distinguished career in government of Brunei, having served in various departments across Brunei before and after World War II.

== Early life and education ==
Patrick G. McAfee, later known as Matnor McAfee, was born in Labuan (now part of Malaysia) on 30 September 1922. He was the son of a colonial policeman of Ulster Scots descent, George McAfee and his native Bruneian wife, Tiah Nayan (died 1965), who served as chief police officer in Labuan from 1917 to 1920 and in Brunei from 1921 to 1928. (Note: The Brunei Police Force was founded under McAfee, who also served as Chief Police Officer for Labuan before local Malay officers gradually replaced the seconded personnel from Labuan.) He received his education at an English school in Labuan.

== Career ==
In 1939, McAfee began working at Brunei's Public Works Department (JKR) as a multi-day meter reader. He began working as an office assistant a year later, and in 1941 he was given a promotion to monthly wage clerk. The Japanese detained him in Labuan from 1944 until 1946 during World War II. While there, he worked for the Australian Army's 9th Division of the Australian Military Police at that period as an interpreter. Later, he started working for the Health Office in Labuan, but in late 1946, he went back to Brunei and rejoined the JKR as a class "B" clerk. He moved to the Customs Department three years later to take up the same position.

In 1951, McAfee was elevated to acting Superintendent of Customs and the following year, he was named Superintendent of Customs Class II. He started working as an administrative officer in the Belait District in 1954. In 1955, he was sent to the United Kingdom to study local government and was tasked with preparing Brunei's Local Government Plan for its implementation in 1956; however, the public ultimately rejected the proposal. Following this, D. L. Bruen, the Assistant Resident, began a six-week tour of Brunei on 6 June 1956, accompanied by McAfee and Sunny bin Ahmad. During their tour, they aimed to gather public feedback and explain the local government plan. Despite their efforts, the initiative faced considerable opposition, largely fueled by concerns from Malay schoolteachers regarding potential taxation and fears of colonial dominance. Many Bruneians were apprehensive that their influence would diminish under the new system, especially given the rising popularity of the Parti Rakyat Brunei (PRB). Subsequently, McAfee was appointed as the district officer for Tutong, effective 11 March 1959.

He was put to work in the Personnel Department upon his return, and in 1956 he went to Kuching for a Local Government Conference. After that, he started working in the office of the resident assistant, acting as Brunei Town's secretary until 1957. He was temporarily named acting District Officer of Brunei later that year, and from December 1957 to March 1958, he was District Officer in Seria, where he also held the position of Class II judge. In September 1958, McAfee received a promotion to Level II Administrative Officer. From March to April 1959, he also held the temporary post of Tutong District Officer. McAfee was among those dispatched to watch general elections with the introduction of 1959 Constitution of Brunei. He was moved to the Secretariat Office later that year, and in 1961 he was appointed Supervisor of Elections.

Following the Brunei revolt in 1962, he was posted as a district officer in Temburong, an area that remained under attack. In order to help the afflicted areas regain order, he worked with the military and local authorities to provide food and medical assistance. Along with three other members from the Department of Elections, Supervisor of Elections McAfee flew to Kuala Lumpur via Singapore in January 1962 in order to gather information on a range of election problems. According to a 3 June 1968 McAfee report, insufficient leadership prevented Brunei's political parties from successfully implementing a democratic government. McAfee spent two years in Temburong before being reassigned in 1964 to supervise the General Election Office.

On 1 November 1970, he transitioned to the Immigration Department as deputy Immigration Controller. In 1972, McAfee was appointed acting Registrar of Nationals in Brunei, replacing Patrick Forde, who was on leave. His appointment took effect on 19 April 1972, and was issued under the authority of the Brunei Nationality (Registration) Regulations, 1961. Later in his career, he was a member of the Council of Ministers, having held the position of acting State Secretary from 15 May 1972 until his death in 1973.

== Death and funeral ==
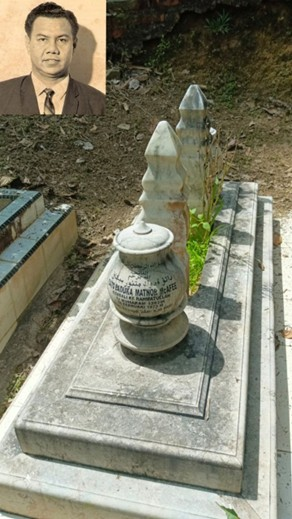
Matnor's gravestone in 2025

When McAfee came at work as usual the morning of 15 February 1973, he started to feel ill as he ascended the stairs. He took a little nap in his office before going to see Pengiran Abdul Momin, the acting Menteri Besar of Brunei, to explain his situation. However, he quickly passed out. He was rushed to the Brunei General Hospital, where he regained consciousness temporarily before fainting again. Roughly before 10:00 a.m., he died despite the efforts of many physicians, including the medical director and a specialist. His widow, Datin Fatimah binti O.K.K. Abdullah, had been by his side since his admittance.

His body was taken to his home in Kampong Delima Satu Pengiran Siraja Muda, Jalan Muara, where over 1,000 people visited to pay their respects before his burial at Dagang Cemetery, Jalan Residency, Bandar Seri Begawan, around 3:00 p.m. Several dignitaries, family, and friends visited his home that morning to offer condolences to his widow and family.

== Personal life ==
McAfee's notable children include Dato Seri Laila Jasa Haji Ahmad, who served as the director of the Narcotics Control Bureau from 1988 to 1992, Senior Superintendent (Retired) Johari, who is the Chief Secretariat of the Safety and Traffic Committee within the Royal Brunei Police Force, and Hajah Fatimah.

== Honours ==
McAfee has been bestowed the following honours:

- Order of Seri Paduka Mahkota Brunei Second Class (DPMB) – Dato Paduka
- Order of Seri Paduka Mahkota Brunei Third Class (SMB)
- Omar Ali Saifuddin Medal (POAS)
- Meritorious Service Medal (PJK; 15 July 1970)
- Long Service Medal (PKL; 23 September 1959)

== Notes ==
Political offices
Preceded by Pengiran Abdul Momin	Acting State Secretary of Brunei; 15 May 1972 – 15 February 1973	Succeeded by Abdul Aziz Umar
