= State Secretary of Brunei =

Former head of administrative affairs of Brunei

- Setiausaha Kerajaan Brunei ستياءوسها كراجأن بروني
- Emblem of Brunei
- Government of Brunei; State Secretary's Office
- Style: The Honourable (Malay: Yang Berhormat)
- Type: State Secretary
- Member of: State Secretary's Office; Council of Ministers; Executive Council
- Reports to: Menteri Besar
- Seat: Secretariat Building, Bandar Seri Begawan, Brunei
- Appointer: Hassanal Bolkiah as Sultan of Brunei
- Term length: At His Majesty's pleasure
- Constituting instrument: Constitution of Brunei
- Formation: 29 September 1959
- First holder: Wan Ahmad Umar
- Final holder: Abdul Rahman Taib
- Abolished: 31 December 1983

The State Secretary (Note: The Secretary of State was another title for the position.) (Malay: Setiausaha Kerajaan; Jawi: ستياءوسها كراجأن) was established to manage Brunei’s internal administrative functions and support the menteri besar (chief minister). Reserved for Malay Muslims, the position became a key figure under the 1959 Constitution, overseeing departmental coordination, advising the Sultan of Brunei, and holding a seat in the Council of Ministers. The state secretary's office was located at the Secretariat Building in Bandar Seri Begawan.

== History ==
The 1888 Protectorate Agreement and the 1905–1906 Supplementary Treaty between Brunei and the United Kingdom were initially enacted to protect Brunei's territorial sovereignty, particularly from external threats. However, as Brunei's governance evolved to meet modern demands, especially during the adoption of a new constitution, a call to reassess these treaties emerged, particularly from residents of the Belait District. In response to these developments, the British Resident system, which had dominated Brunei's administration, was abolished. The role of the Resident, once the chief administrator, was downgraded to an advisory position to the sultan of Brunei and the State Council. This shift officially paved the way for the creation of new roles such as the chief minister and the state secretary, which were essential to modernising Brunei's political structure and adapting to contemporary governance needs.

== Functions ==
The state secretary was established to support the chief minister in overseeing Brunei's administrative functions. The position was specifically reserved for Malay Muslims and required nomination by the sultan. Under the 1959 Constitution, the state secretary became the principal officer managing internal administrative affairs, ensuring departmental coordination and policy consultation. The state secretary also held a seat in the Council of Ministers, Executive Council and worked alongside other key officials like the attorney general and the state financial officer to implement the sultan's executive authority. Additionally, in legal matters involving government personnel, documents signed by the state secretary, such as those certifying employment details, were accepted as conclusive evidence in court.

== List of secretariats ==
Symbols

Pre-war secretariat
Acting secretariats

No.	Portrait	Name	Took office	Left office	Time in office	Monarch	Ref
–		Pehin Datu Perdana Manteri; Dato Laila Utama; Ibrahim Mohammad Jahfar إبراهيم محمد جهفر (1902–1971)	1941	1945	3 years (Note: Under the pre-war State Secretary Ibrahim Mohammad Jahfar, Brunei was theoretically controlled by its State Council over the following three and a half years of Japanese occupation during World War II.)	Ahmad Tajuddin	
1		Wan Ahmad Umar مرسل ماون (b.1923)	29 September 1959	1 January 1962	2 years, 3 days	Omar Ali Saifuddien III	
2		Dato' Seri; Raja Azam مرسل ماون (1918–1999)	1 January 1962	18 January 1964	2 years, 3 days	Omar Ali Saifuddien III	
3		Pengiran Setia Negara; Pengiran Muhammad Yusuf ڤڠيرن محمد يوسف (1923–2016)	18 January 1964	1 June 1967	3 years, 134 days	Omar Ali Saifuddien III	
–		Dato Setia; Taib Besar طائب بسر (1916–1974)	1 June 1967	25 March 1970	2 years, 297 days	Omar Ali Saifuddien III	
4		Pengiran Dipa Negara Laila Diraja; Pengiran Abdul Momin ڤڠيرن عبدالمومين (1927–2008); Acting from 23 July 1969	25 March 1970	15 May 1972	2 years, 51 days	Hassanal Bolkiah	
–		Dato Paduka; Matnor McAfee متنور مچفياي (1922–1973)	15 May 1972	15 February 1973	276 days (Note: Died in office)	Hassanal Bolkiah	
5		Pehin Orang Kaya Laila Wijaya; Dato Seri Setia; Abdul Aziz Umar عبدالعزيز عمر (b.1936); Acting from 16 February 1973	1 July 1974	1 September 1981	7 years, 62 days	Hassanal Bolkiah	
6		Pehin Orang Kaya Seri Lela; Dato Seri Setia; Abdul Rahman Taib عبدالرحمن طائب (b.1942)	1 September 1981	31 December 1983	2 years, 121 days	Hassanal Bolkiah	

== See also ==
- Prime Minister of Brunei
- Government of Brunei
- Politics of Brunei
