= Abdul Aziz Umar =

Bruneian civil servant and politician (born 1936)

Yang Dimuliakan Pehin Orang Kaya Laila Wijaya Dato Seri Setia Abdul Aziz Umar PSNB DPMB SLJ GBE PJK PKL
- عبد العزيز عمر
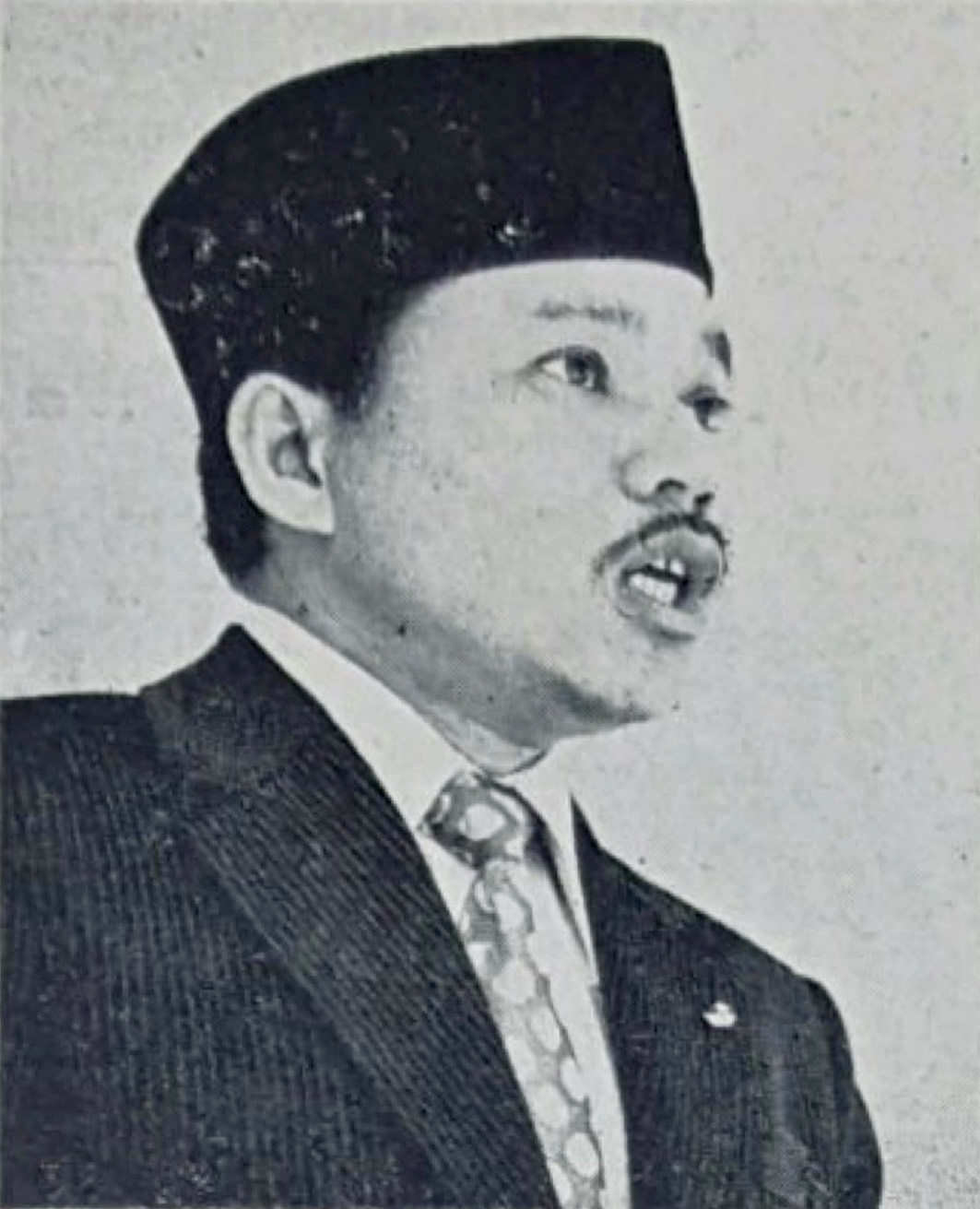
- Abdul Aziz in 1975

Minister of Education
- In office 30 November 1988 – 24 May 2005
- Monarch: Hassanal Bolkiah
- Deputy: Ahmad Jumat; Suyoi Osman
- Preceded by: Abdul Rahman Taib
- Succeeded by: Abdul Rahman Taib

Minister of Health
- Acting
- In office 25 March 1998 – 17 May 2002
- Monarch: Hassanal Bolkiah
- Preceded by: Johar Noordin
- Succeeded by: Abu Bakar Apong

Minister of Communications
- In office 20 October 1986 – 30 November 1988
- Preceded by: Pengiran Bahrin
- Succeeded by: Zakaria Sulaiman

Minister of Education and Health
- In office 1 January 1984 – 20 October 1986
- Preceded by: Office established
- Succeeded by: Abdul Rahman Taib (Minister of Education); Johar Noordin (Minister of Health)

Menteri Besar of Brunei
- Acting
- In office 1 September 1981 – 31 December 1983
- Preceded by: Pengiran Abdul Momin
- Succeeded by: Office abolished

State Secretary of Brunei
- In office 1 July 1974 – 1 September 1981
- Preceded by: Matnor McAfee (Acting)
- Succeeded by: Abdul Rahman Taib

Personal details
- Born: 20 March 1936 (age 90) Brunei Town, Brunei
- Spouse: Zaharah Idris
- Relatives: Jamil Al-Sufri (half-brother); Hamzah Sahat (son-in-law)
- Education: St. George's School; Sultan Omar Ali Saifuddien College; Westminster College of Commerce
- Alma mater: University of Birmingham (BSS)
- Occupation: Civil servant; politician

Abdul Aziz bin Haji Umar (born 20 March 1936) is a Bruneian aristocrat and politician who held a wide range of positions in the government of Brunei. Before that, he served as the minister of communications, minister of education, and minister of health. Beginning his career in the civil service with his first appointment in 1964, he held various roles until Brunei's independence in 1984, including serving as the acting menteri besar (chief minister) from 1981 to 1983.

Abdul Aziz is recognised as Brunei's first minister of education and its last colonial chief minister. As one of the nation's 'founding leaders,' he was part of a group of Bruneians with Western educations who significantly contributed to the country's development after gaining independence. A leading advocate for adopting Melayu Islam Beraja (MIB) as Brunei's national philosophy, Abdul Aziz played a pivotal role in integrating this concept into the nation's educational system. He also held prominent positions, including chairman of the Brunei Investment Agency (BIA), and was a member of the Royal Succession Council, the Privy Council, and the Brunei Islamic Religious Council (MUIB). Since 15 May 1998, he has served as the vice-chairman of the board of trustees at the Oxford Centre for Islamic Studies, University of Oxford.

== Early life and education ==
Born in Brunei Town on 20 March 1936 to the aristocrat Begawan Pehin Udana Khatib Dato Seri Paduka Haji Umar, he began his early education at the Roman Catholic St. George's School in Brunei Town. He continued his studies at the Sultan Muhammad Jamalul Alam Malay School from 1950 to 1956. After completing his primary education, he spent a year at Batu Lintang Teachers' College in Kuching, Sarawak, Malaysian Borneo. He then returned to Brunei to finish his secondary education at Sultan Omar Ali Saifuddien College. In 1957, he resumed his studies at Westminster College of Commerce in London and at Woodchester School in Gloucestershire, England. He later graduated from the University of Birmingham in the United Kingdom with a Bachelor of Social Science degree in economics, politics, and sociology in 1964.

== Political career ==
=== Early career ===
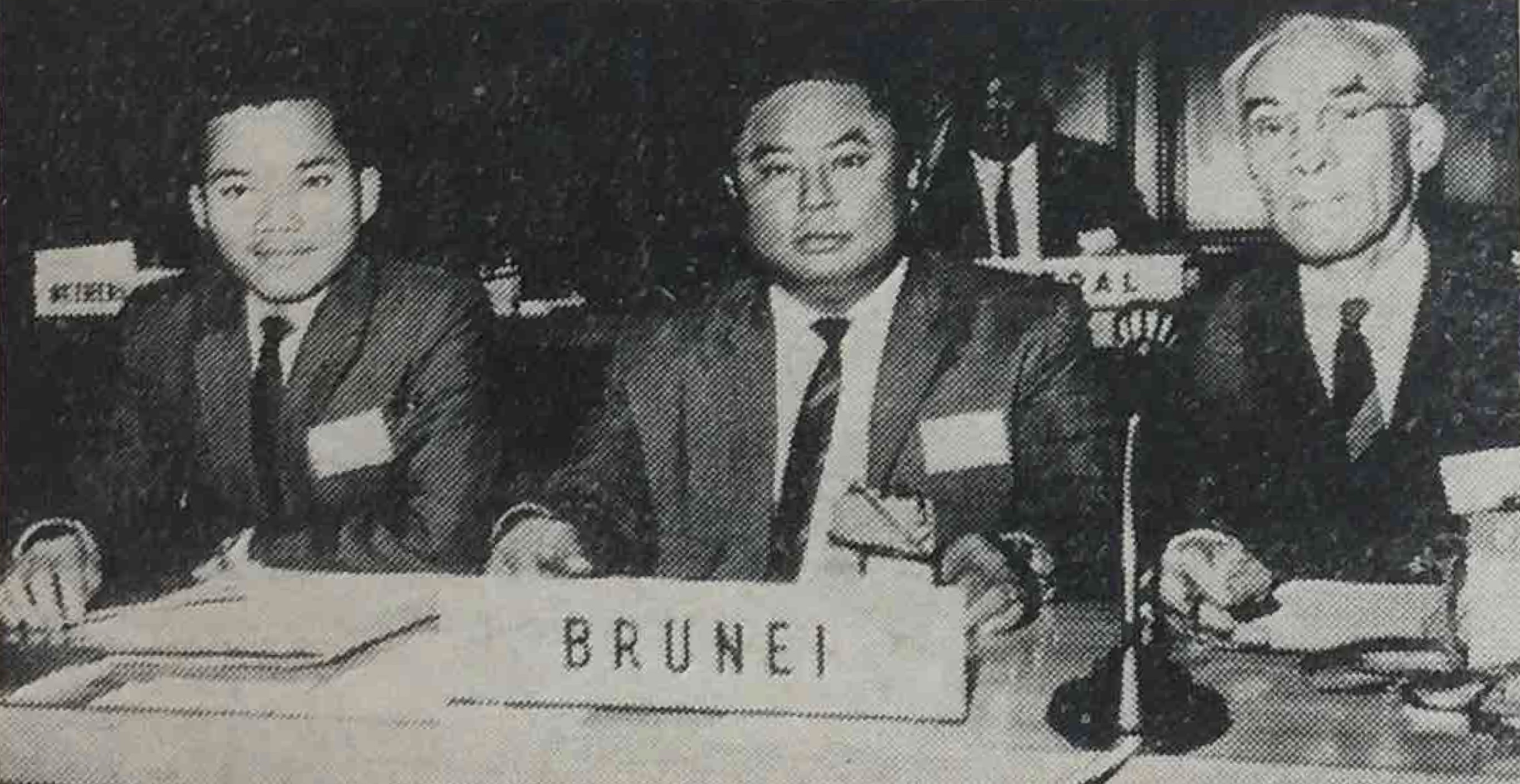
Abdul Aziz (left) during the 1965 ECAFE conference

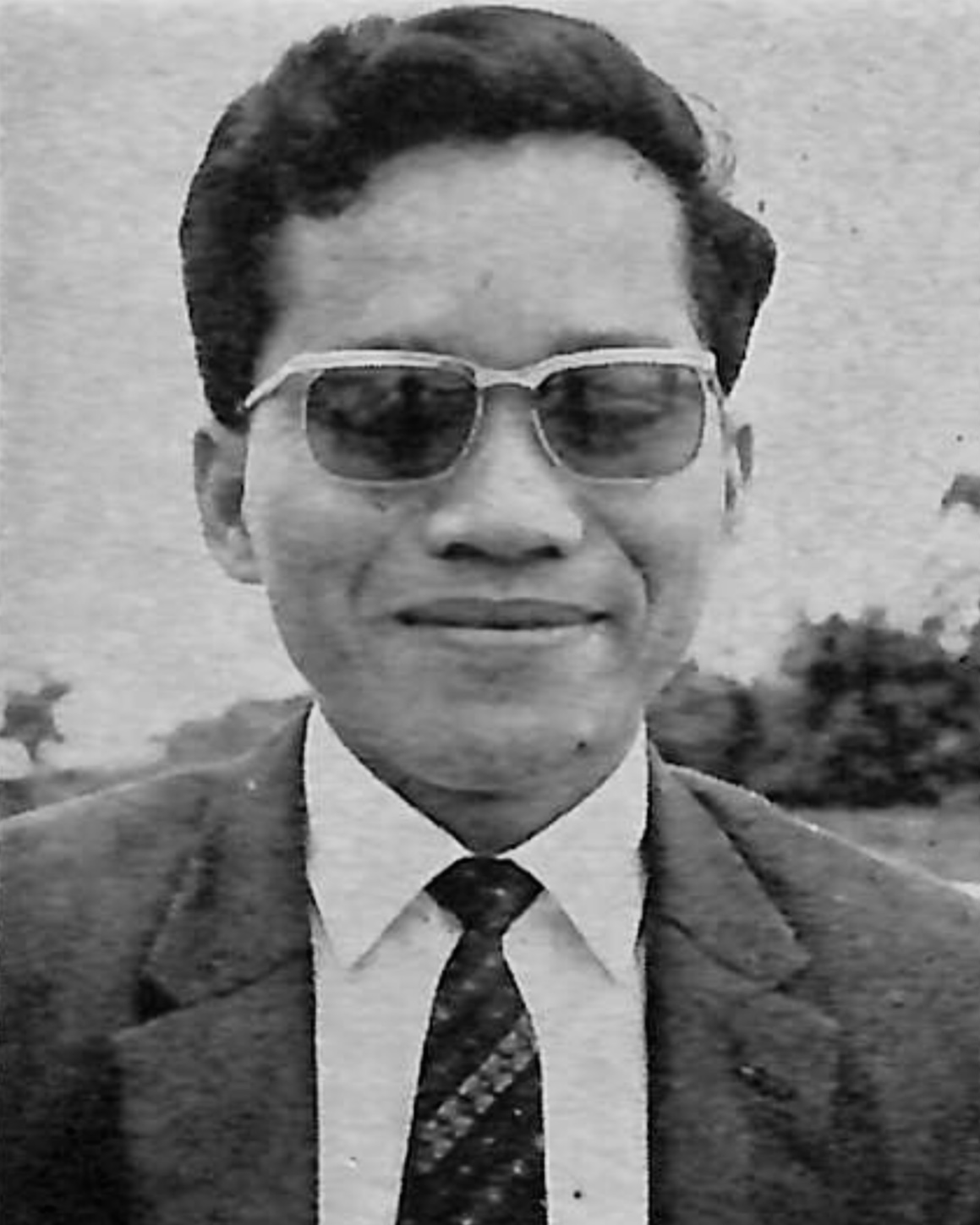
Abdul Aziz as the president of the Brunei Youth Council in 1967–1968

Abdul Aziz began his career in the Bruneian government on 20 October 1964, when he was appointed as an administrative service officer. In March 1965, he represented Brunei at the Economic Commission for Asia and the Far East (ECAFE) conference in New Zealand, where he served as the deputy head representative and representative secretary. During the conference, he contributed to discussions on Brunei's development challenges and progress, fostering greater understanding and collaboration with other nations.

Over the years, Abdul Aziz held a variety of significant positions in the government, including director of resettlement in 1966, controller of customs and excise in 1967, director of public works in 1970, and director of establishment in 1971. He was also appointed commissioner of lands from 30 March to 7 April 1972, commissioner of development in 1972, chairman of the municipal board in 1973, state secretary of Brunei from 1974 to 1981, and acting chief minister from 1 September 1981 to 31 December 1983. In January 1982, Abdul Aziz made an official visit to Kuala Lumpur, which helped to strengthen ties between Brunei and Malaysia, focusing on administrative training, educational collaboration, and representative exchanges.

=== Minister of Education and Health ===
Following Brunei's full independence, Abdul Aziz was appointed as minister of education and health on 1 January 1984. In April of the same year, he announced that Brunei would implement a bilingual education system, teaching both English and Malay from January 1985. To prepare for this shift, 400 teachers attended a MIB teacher training course in October 1984, which included lectures on Islam, customs, and national education. Abdul Aziz emphasised the importance of spreading the ideals of MIB throughout the community. Throughout the year, Islam, as the official state religion, was prominently highlighted, and Muslim holidays were strictly observed.

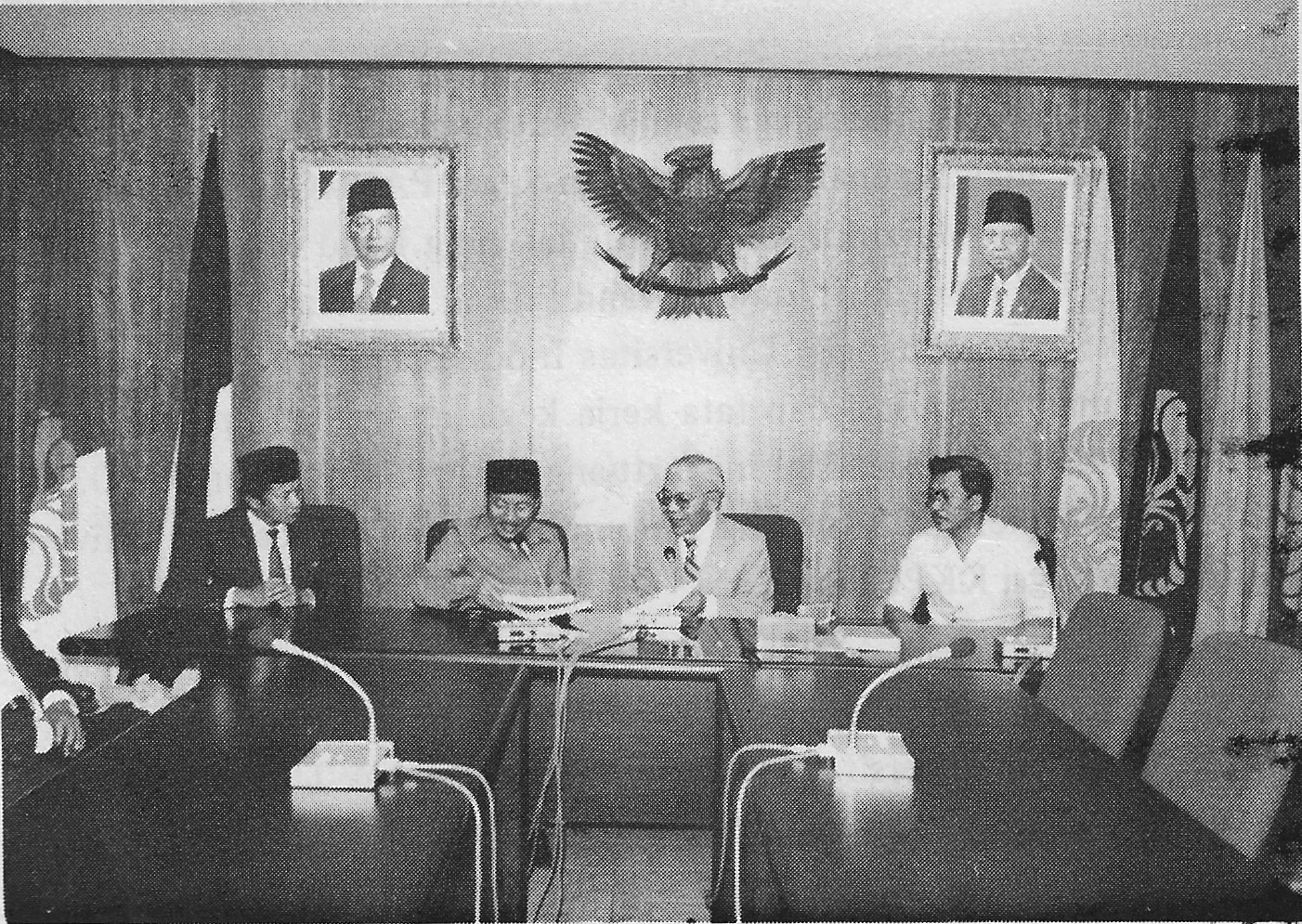
Abdul Aziz (second from left) meets Tumbelaka (second from right) during a visit to the University of Indonesia, c. 1985

The concept of Brunei as MIB was clarified in 1985. Abdul Aziz stated that the ultimate goal was for all Bruneians, regardless of race or religion, to understand and uphold the values of MIB. This was highlighted during the country's May admission to the World Health Organization (WHO). The theme for events commemorating the first anniversary of independence on 23 February 1985, "United in support of the concept of Malay Islamic Monarchy," further underscored the government's commitment to advancing this concept. When Sultan Hassanal Bolkiah officially opened the B$11.6 million Islamic Da’wah Centre in Kampong Pulaie, he reaffirmed his dedication to spreading Islamic teachings. The educational system also adopted this commitment to Islamic values. Abdul Aziz outlined the three guiding principles—Islamisation of knowledge, MIB, and bilingualism—that would shape the development of national educational programmes. That same year, he was appointed vice-chancellor of Universiti Brunei Darussalam (UBD), a role he held until 1986.

In 1986, Abdul Aziz highlighted the growing issues of drug abuse, alcohol consumption, and vandalism in the nation. He attributed these problems to employment and underemployment challenges within a limited economy, where many young Bruneians worked in the public sector. Despite the government offering higher pay and benefits, private companies struggled to recruit workers due to a lack of dedication and experience. Abdul Aziz's remarks reflected his growing concern about the spread of these societal issues, such as an increase in drug-related convictions, which had not been a significant problem just a few years earlier. On 20 October 1986, Abdul Aziz was transferred to the Ministry of Communications. As a skilled administrator and a firm conservative Muslim, he began to exert influence over government education policy.

=== Minister of Communications ===
Following the death of his father, the sultan announced a new cabinet on 20 October 1986 via Radio Television Brunei. This reorganisation resulted in the creation of thirteen ministerial positions, including the appointment of Abdul Aziz as minister of communications. Despite these changes, the sultan emphasised that government policies would remain unchanged. On 11 August 1988, the sultan issued a directive for the implementation of the Post Office Act (Chapter 52), which was to take effect on 1 September of that year.

=== Minister of Education ===
On 30 November 1988, Abdul Aziz resumed his role as minister of education. In 1989, he was reappointed as vice-chancellor of UBD. In April 1990, he announced the gradual phasing out of coeducational schools to align with Islamic principles and introduced the concept of MIB into the education system, establishing it as a core subject for all students. These actions can be seen as cautious steps towards solidifying MIB as the national narrative while laying the groundwork for a gradual shift towards constitutionalism, provided the monarchy continues to uphold its image as the protector of Malays and the guardian of the Islamic faith.

Under his leadership, the school curriculum incorporated MIB, and the enforcement of Islamic law became notably strict. His tenure as vice-chancellor concluded in 1991. By 1992, Abdul Aziz further emphasised Islam's foundational role in Bruneian values, reaffirming its centrality within the MIB philosophy.

The component 'I' (Islam) has two main functions: while Islam becomes the guiding principle (teras), it also acts as a form of fortification or shield (benteng). The presence of 'I' makes the other two components 'M' (Malay) and 'B' (Ber-aja or Monarchy) to act in accordance with the command of Allah (God the Almighty).

— Pehin Orang Kaya Laila Wijaya Dato Seri Setia (Dr.) Haji Abdul Aziz, Brunei Darussalam Newsletter (30 November 1992)

In his speech at the 31st general meeting of the Malay Chamber of Commerce and Industry in 1996, Abdul Aziz urged Malay business leaders to enhance the bumiputera presence in the economy, emphasising the importance of improving their financial standing, competitiveness, and entrepreneurial spirit. However, efforts to unite six major Malay business associations to form a new Council for Malay Commerce and Industry encountered difficulties.

Abdul Aziz also chaired Global Evergreen, a business established to address the fallout from the Amedeo Development Corporation (ADC) crisis, which was headed by Prince Jefri Bolkiah. At the time, Abdul Aziz was acting minister of health and co-currently minister of education. (Note: On 25 March 1998, Abdul Aziz, then serving as the minister of education, was appointed acting minister of health following the removal of Johar Noordin, the health minister.) He had previously chaired the task force set up by the sultan to investigate ADC's 1997 collapse. Following a shift in government leadership in 1998, Abdul Aziz was appointed acting head of the BIA. Some speculated that this change reflected the rise of more conservative factions around the sultan, coinciding with an increased public profile and influence of Prince Mohamed Bolkiah in the nation's political and economic affairs. The resignations of several key figures further fuelled rumours of a power struggle. While official sources denied these claims, Abdul Aziz's appointment was seen as a consolidation of conservative elements in the government. His control of the BIA, alongside his religious authority, reinforced the monarchy's power.

With this settlement, Insha Allah (God willing), all assets such as hotels, buildings, lands, shares and other similar assets in Brunei Darussalam and overseas, which were acquired with money derived from BIA and are at present under the control of His Highness (Prince Jefri) and his family, will be returned to the BIA.

— Pehin Orang Kaya Laila Wijaya Dato Seri Setia (Dr.) Haji Abdul Aziz, The Sunday Times (14 May 2000)

Abdul Aziz served as the chairman of the Yayasan Sultan Haji Hassanal Bolkiah's administrative committee for two terms, from 2000 to 2004 and from 2004 to 2008. On 1 January 2001, he enacted the Emergency (Public Health) (Food) Order, 1998. On 8 August 2001, Abdul Aziz expressed concern over Brunei's low breastfeeding rate of 12.4%, emphasising the benefits of breastfeeding, including improved memory and emotional traits in children. He advocated for exclusive breastfeeding in accordance with WHO guidelines and Islamic teachings and presented awards for initiatives promoting breastfeeding.

On 1 May 2002, Abdul Aziz addressed the issue of rising youth unemployment, stressing the need for stronger cooperation between the public and private sectors, particularly with the Chinese Chamber of Commerce. He also highlighted the importance of a unified education system in shaping Brunei's national identity. On 10 April 2003, Abdul Aziz signed a memorandum of understanding in Jakarta, focusing on defence cooperation on behalf of Brunei. With the consent of the sultan, he established the Education (School Associations) Regulations, 2004, on 6 January 2004. Abdul Aziz concluded his tenure as education minister on 24 May 2005. Reports suggest that he lost his position due to allegations that he had impeded economic growth by placing greater emphasis on religious studies over science and technology in the curriculum.

== Later life ==
On 7 April 2011, Abdul Aziz was appointed as a member of the Privy Council.

On 31 August 2020, Abdul Aziz was appointed as a member of MUIB for a three-year term, spanning from 1 August 2020 to 31 July 2023. On 11 April 2021, he emphasised the need for the Brunei Malay Teachers Association (PGGMB), established 82 years ago, to adapt to modern demands in order to support national progress. Speaking at the opening ceremony of PGGMB's 71st delegates general meeting for the 2020–2021 session, held at the PGGMB School in Kampong Sungai Akar, he remarked:

How can PGGMB shape itself to be relevant in this age? Because PGGMB today cannot justify itself on the needs and goals of the community 82 years ago. This is our challenge today, on how we can inculcate PGGMB to be of noticeable significance in today's community, so that the community will not turn away, except for its vital role in developing our beloved nation. Relevance will only be visible through unity of Malay teachers in the country, that is revolved around the national interest and the community at large.

— Pehin Orang Kaya Laila Wijaya Dato Seri Setia (Dr.) Haji Abdul Aziz, Borneo Bulletin (13 April 2021)

== Personal life ==
Abdul Aziz is married to Datin Paduka Hajah Zaharah binti Haji Idris, and they have five children, including Anita Binurul Zahrina, who later married Hamzah Sahat. He had an elder brother, Haji Mohd Tahir (1923–2014), who also served in the government and as a public prosecutor. Additionally, Abdul Aziz is the half-brother of Jamil Al-Sufri, principal of Brunei History Centre, and uncle to Abdul Latif, president of Brunei National Democratic Party. The family resides at 16, Simpang 23, Kampong Serusop.

== Titles, styles and honours ==
=== Titles and styles ===
On 5 September 1977, Abdul Aziz was honoured by Sultan Hassanal Bolkiah with the manteri title of Pehin Orang Kaya Laila Wijaya, bearing the style Yang Dimuliakan.

=== Awards ===
He has been given the following awards:

- Belia Berjasa (2006)
- Outstanding Health Award
- Prominent Religious Award (2009)
- Anugerah Pendidikan Sultan Haji Omar 'Ali Saifuddien (24 September 2011)
- SEAMEO 50th Anniversary Recognition Award (7 May 2015)
- Distinguished Fellow Award, International Council on Education for Teaching (ICET)

=== Honours ===
Abdul Aziz has been bestowed the following honours:

National

- Order of Setia Negara Brunei First Class (PSNB) – Dato Seri Setia (1975)
- Order of Seri Paduka Mahkota Brunei Second Class (DPMB) – Dato Paduka (1972)
- Order of Paduka Seri Laila Jasa Third Class (SLJ; 15 July 1970)
- Meritorious Service Medal (PJK; 1973)
- Long Service Medal (PKL; 1994)
- Coronation Medal First Class (1968)
- Proclamation of Independence Medal (1997)
- Sultan of Brunei Silver Jubilee Medal First Class (1992)
- Universiti Brunei Darussalam Doctor in Literature (D.Litt.; 1996)

Foreign

- United Kingdom:
  - Knight Grand Cross of the Order of the British Empire (GBE)
  - University of Birmingham Doctor in Law (LLD; July 1994)
  - Royal College of Surgeons Fellowship (1997)
  - University of Liverpool Doctor in Law (LLD; 3 July 2000)
- Thailand:
  - Knight Grand Cross of the Order of the White Elephant (PCh (KCE); August 2002)
- Pakistan:
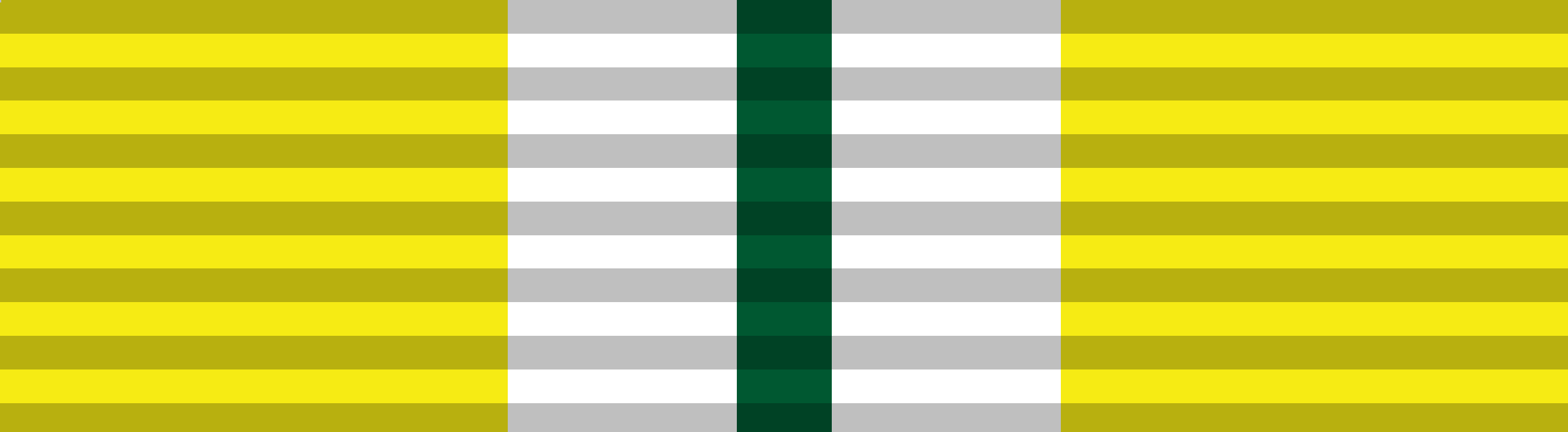
  - Sitara-i-Imtiaz
- Jordan:
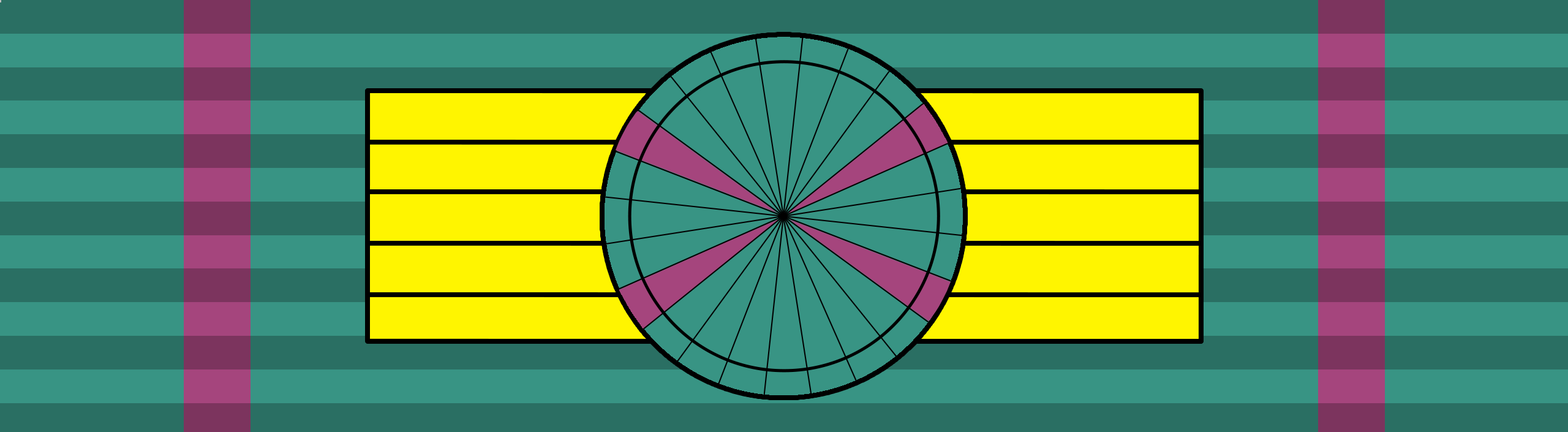
  - Order of the Star of Jordan Grand Cordon
- Malaysia:
  - Universiti Teknologi Malaysia Doctor of Engineering (DEng; 1991)
- India:
  - Aligarh Muslim University Doctor in Letters (D.Litt.; 1999)

== Notes ==
Political offices
Preceded by Abdul Rahman Taib	Minister of Education; 30 November 1988 – 24 May 2005	Succeeded by Abdul Rahman Taib
Preceded by Johar Noordin	Acting Minister of Health; 25 March 1998 – 17 May 2002	Succeeded by Abu Bakar Apong
Preceded by Pengiran Bahrin	Minister of Communications; 20 October 1986 – 30 November 1988	Succeeded by Zakaria Sulaiman
Preceded by Office established	Minister of Education and Health; 1 January 1984 – 20 October 1986	Succeeded by Abdul Rahman Taib (Minister of Education); Johar Noordin (Minister of Health)
Preceded by Pengiran Abdul Momin	Acting Menteri Besar of Brunei; 1 September 1981 – 31 December 1983	Succeeded by Office abolished
Preceded by Matnor McAfee (Acting)	5th State Secretary of Brunei; 1 July 1974 – 1 September 1981	Succeeded by Abdul Rahman Taib
Academic offices
Preceded by Office established Abdul Rahman Taib	Vice-Chancellor of Universiti Brunei Darussalam; 1985–1986; 1989–1990	Succeeded by Abdul Rahman Taib; Abu Bakar Apong
