= List of high commissioners of Brunei to Malaysia =

Coordinates: 2.9468419°N 101.7264141°E

High Commissioner of Brunei to Malaysia
- Emblem of Brunei
- Incumbent; Mahmud Saidin since 11 October 2021
- Style: His Excellency
- Residence: Kuala Lumpur
- Appointer: Sultan of Brunei
- Term length: At His Majesty's pleasure
- Inaugural holder: Abdul Momin Ismail (non-resident); Jaya Rajid (resident)
- Website: Official website

The Bruneian High Commissioner in Kuala Lumpur is the official representative of the Government in Bandar Seri Begawan to Malaysia. The Republic of Iraq and the Kingdom of Eswatini are two other countries to which the high commission holds accreditation as Ambassador to Iraq and High Commissioner to Eswatini.

== History ==
As a consequence of better ties between the two countries, Brunei established a government agency office in Kuala Lumpur in January 1982, concurrently with the establishment of a representative office in Bandar Seri Begawan by the Malaysian government. The announcement made by Brunei in September 1982 that it had extended diplomatic rights and immunities to the Malaysian Government Agency representative was warmly welcomed in the diplomatic community.

The Sultan declared in October 1982 that the Malaysian Government Agency would be promoted to Commissioner rank by the government. In January 1984, full diplomatic ties were established between Malaysia and Brunei at High Commissioner level. On 12 August 1992, Brunei established a resident high commission in India, which was led by an acting high commissioner. The high commissioner of Brunei to Malaysia was previously accredited to India. Brunei maintains consulate-generals in Kuching and Kota Kinabalu, in addition to a high commission in Putrajaya.

== List of High Commissioners ==
Diplomatic agrément/Diplomatic accreditation	Ambassador	Observations	Prime Minister of Brunei / Sultan of Brunei	Prime Minister of Malaysia	Term end
1989	Pengiran Dipa Negara Laila Diraja Pengiran Haji Abdul Momin bin Pengiran Haji Ismail		Hassanal Bolkiah	Mahathir Mohamad	1990
29 August 1993	Pengiran Setia Raja Pengiran Haji Jaya bin Pengiran Haji Rajid		Hassanal Bolkiah	Mahathir Mohamad	1995
17 November 1995	Pengiran Setia Negara Pengiran Haji Mohd. Yusuf bin Pengiran Haji Abdul Rahim	Since 1997, the leaders of Malaysia and Brunei have convened on a regular basis as part of the Annual Leaders' Consultations (ALC).	Hassanal Bolkiah	Mahathir Mohamad	2001
November 2005	Dato Seri Setia Dr. Haji Mohd Amin bin Pehin Datu Pekerma Dewa Dato Paduka Haji Abdul Rahim	Prince Al-Muhtadee Billah and senior minister at the Prime Minister's Office and Princess Sarah made an official four-day visit to Malaysia on 1–4 August 2008.	Hassanal Bolkiah	Abdullah Ahmad Badawi	2008
4 March 2010	Pehin Datu Lailaraja Major General (Retired) Dato Paduka Seri Haji Halbi bin Haji Mohd Yussof		Hassanal Bolkiah	Najib Razak	29 May 2010
18 February 2011	Dato Paduka Haji Ishaaq bin Haji Abdullah		Hassanal Bolkiah	Najib Razak	2014
25 November 2014	Dato Paduka Haji Alaihuddin bin Pehin Orang Kaya Digadong Seri Lela Dato Seri Utama Haji Awang Mohd Taha	The Sultan of Brunei was present in Malaysia's 20th ALC in October of 2016. The Sultan went to Sarawak in January 2017 to attend Adenan Satem's funeral. The codeshare agreement between MAS and RBA was signed on 26 March 2017. The Sultan visited Sultan Ahmad Shah in Kuala Lumpur in May 2018 after meeting with Mahathir Mohamad in Putrajaya. Prince Abdul Mateen joined the Sultan on this visit.	Hassanal Bolkiah	Najib Razak	December 2020
11 October 2021	Brigadier General (Retired) Dato Paduka Haji Mahmud bin Haji Saidin		Hassanal Bolkiah	Ismail Sabri Yaakob	incumbent

== See also ==
- Brunei–Malaysia relations
