= Pengiran Abdul Momin (born 1927) =

Bruneian diplomat and politician (1927–2008)

Yang Amat Mulia Pengiran Dipa Negara Laila Diraja Pengiran Abdul Momin DK DSNB DPMB LVO POAS PHBS PBLI PJK PKL
- عبد المؤمن
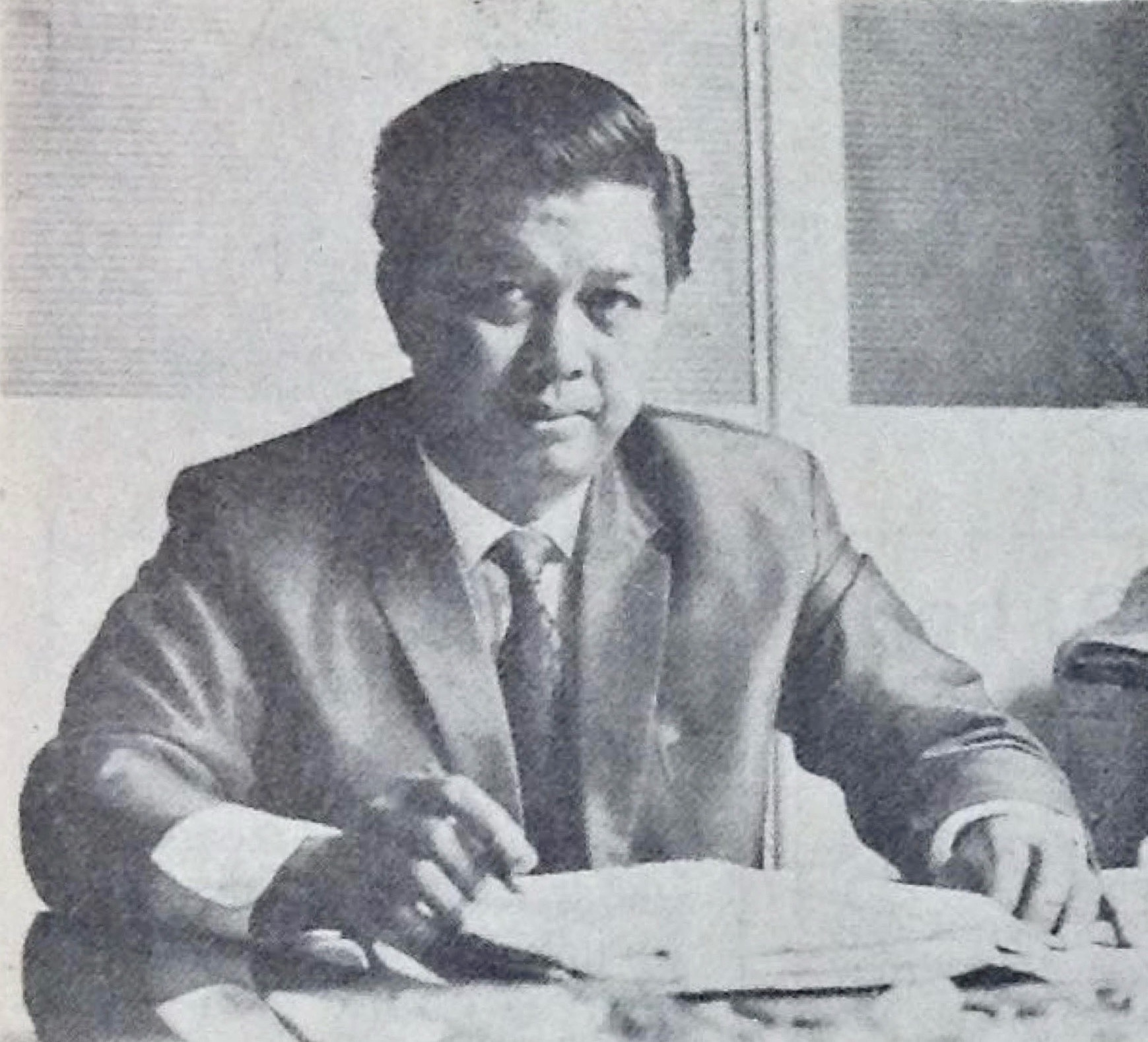
- Pengiran Abdul Momin, c. 1970

Member of Legislative Council
- In office 6 September 2004 – 17 May 2008

Permanent Representative of Brunei to the United Nations
- In office 1994–1995
- Preceded by: Office established
- Succeeded by: Mohammad Daud

High Commissioner of Brunei to Malaysia
- In office 1989–1990
- Preceded by: Office established
- Succeeded by: Pengiran Jaya

4th Menteri Besar of Brunei
- In office 1 July 1974 – 31 August 1981
- Monarch: Hassanal Bolkiah
- Preceded by: Pengiran Muhammad Yusuf
- Succeeded by: Abdul Aziz Umar (acting)

4th State Secretary of Brunei
- In office 25 March 1970 – 15 May 1972
- Preceded by: Taib Besar (acting)
- Succeeded by: Matnor McAfee (acting)

Personal details
- Born: 5 December 1927 Brunei Town, Brunei
- Died: 17 May 2008 (aged 80) Kampong Telanai, Bandar Seri Begawan, Brunei
- Resting place: Kampong Telanai Muslim Cemetery, Bandar Seri Begawan, Brunei
- Spouse: Masnah Yusuf (m. 1947)
- Relatives: Pengiran Jaya (brother); Pengiran Mohammed (uncle)
- Education: Roman Catholic Mission School
- Alma mater: Carleton University
- Occupation: Civil servant; diplomat

Pengiran Abdul Momin bin Pengiran Haji Ismail (Note: The former spelling of his given name is "Pengiran Momin" rather than "Pengiran Abdul Momin.") (5 December 1927 – 17 May 2008) was a civil servant, diplomat and noble legislative councillor. He served as Brunei's fourth state secretary from 1970 to 1972 before becoming menteri besar (chief minister) from 1974 to 1981. Throughout his career, he held several diplomatic postings in various countries and represented Brunei at the United Nations (UN). Additionally, he was an appointed member of the Legislative Council of Brunei (LegCo) from 2004 until his passing in 2008.

During his service to the government of Brunei, Pengiran Abdul Momin made notable contributions to the country's development. He organised dialogue sessions with the public, established the Brunei Arts and Handicrafts Training Centre to preserve traditional arts, and introduced civic courses for village heads, community leaders, and house chiefs. Additionally, he played a key role in developing an educational system with a focus on agriculture, implementing practical methods based on science and technology at the Sinaut Agricultural Training Centre.

== Early life and education ==
Pengiran Abdul Momin bin Pengiran Haji Ismail was born in Brunei on 5 December 1927 and received his early education at Brunei Town Malay School and the Roman Catholic Mission School, which later became St George's School, both schools located in the capital of Brunei Town, present day Bandar Seri Begawan.

== Political career ==
Pengiran Abdul Momin began his career as a clerk in 1946 and was appointed an administrative officer in January 1955, becoming the assistant district officer of Belait. He was later appointed by the State Council as a magistrate in class II. In August 1958, he was promoted to district officer, a position he held until September 1959. During this time, he was sent to Ottawa, Canada to take a diploma in political science and public administration at Carlton University. He returned to the role of district officer of Belait in 1963.

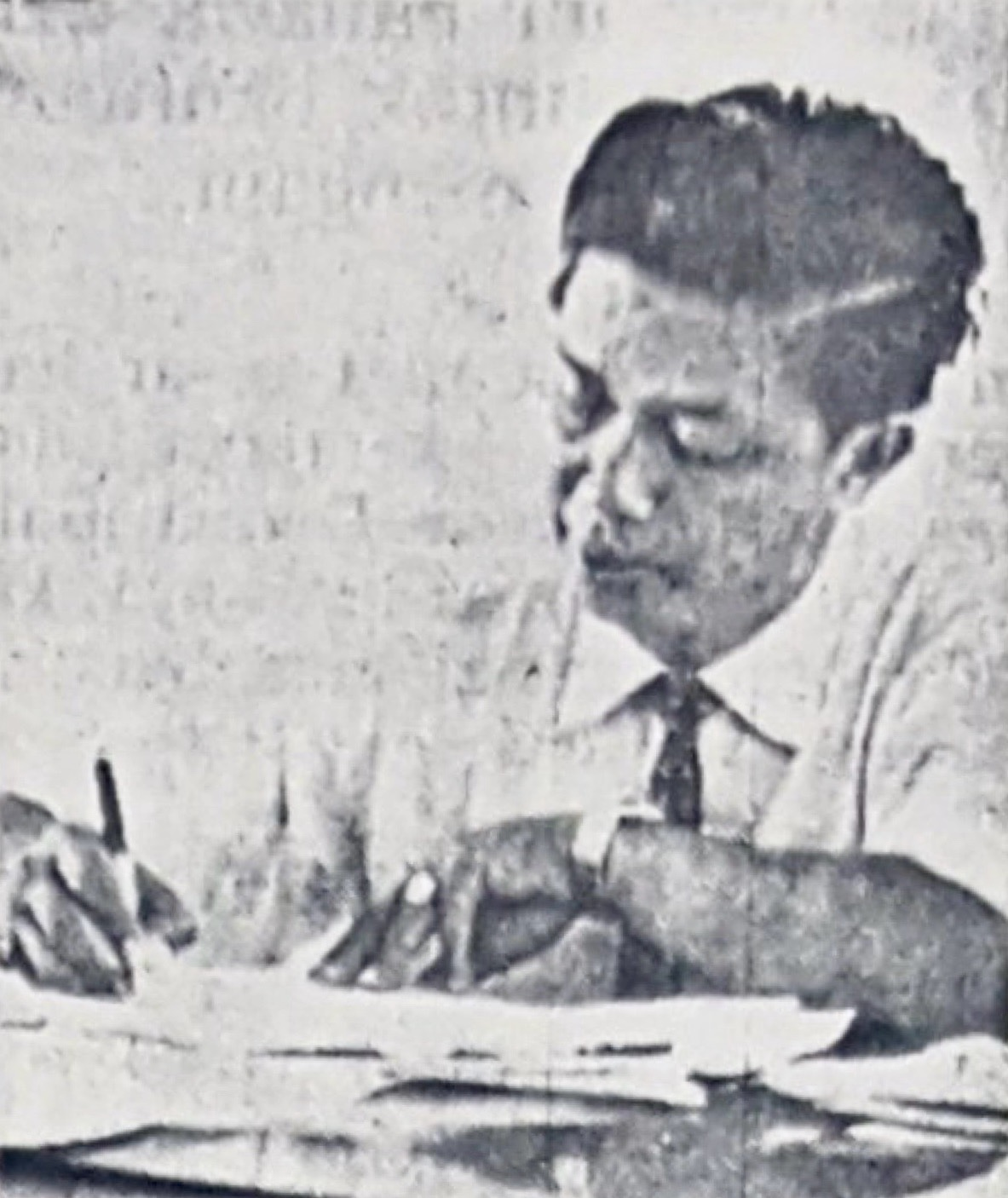
Pengiran Abdul Momin, c. 1963

In February 1963, Pengiran Abdul Momin urged local Chinese merchants to set reasonable prices and clearly label them, addressing public concerns over rising costs while assuring that essential goods remained sufficient in the country. A month later, he announced the commencement of an B$8,500 project in the Belait district, which included constructing small roads—one between Lumut and Sungai Liang spanning 80 chains (5,300 ft; 1,600 m) and another between Bukit Sawat and Merangking Ulu measuring 700 feet—as well as cleaning Sungai Terima up to Simpang Labit. Later that year, on 28 July, he officiated the opening of the adult Malay language class in Lumut and commended the villagers for supporting the government's literacy initiative. In August, Pengiran Abdul Momin also officiated the opening of the adult religious class for men at Ahmad Tajuddin Malay School in Kuala Belait.

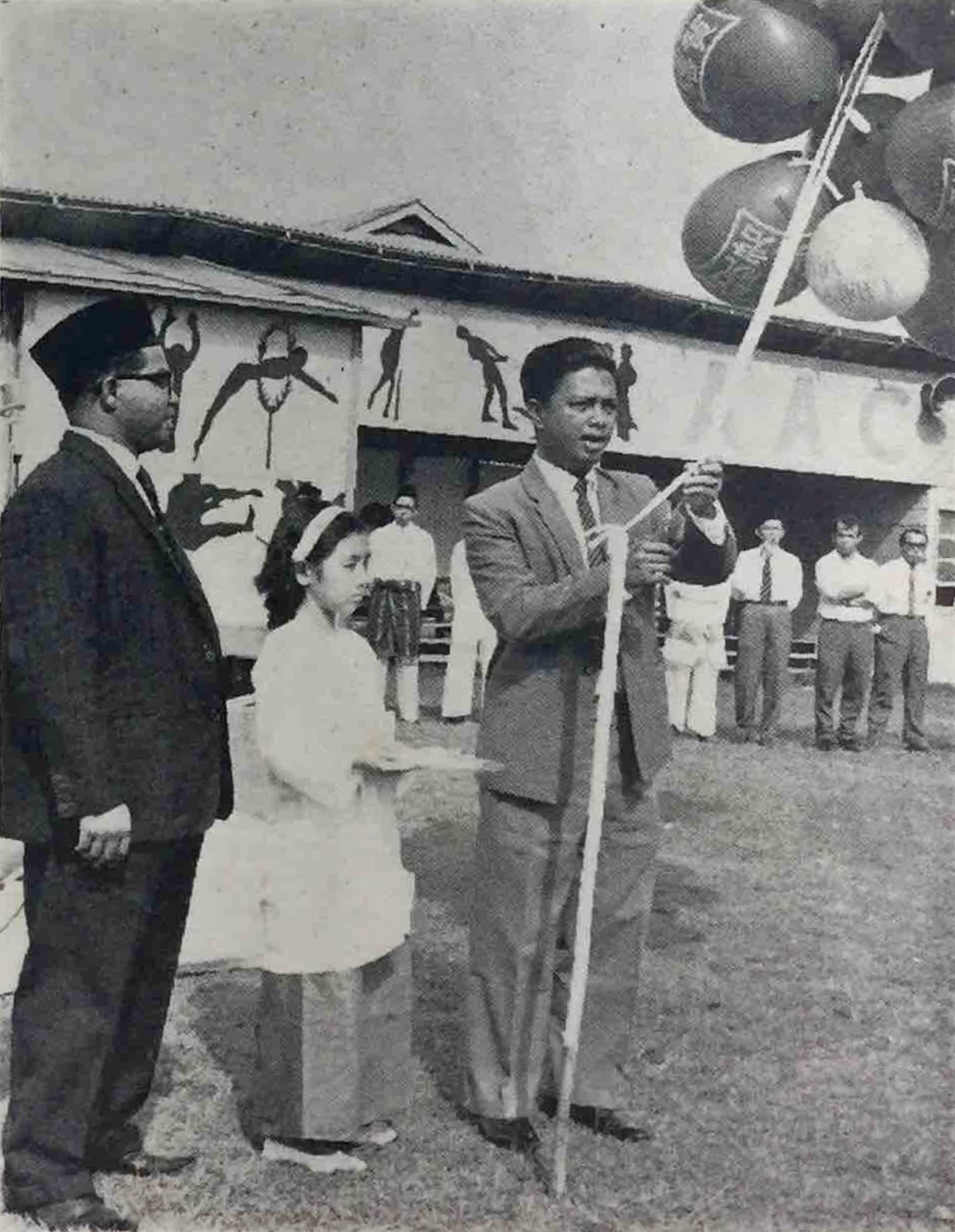
Pengiran Abdul Momin officiating the 1964 sultan's birthday celebration at Anthony Abell College

Pengiran Abdul Momin and Abidin Abdul Rashid attended the UN conference on human rights for developing nations from 12 to 18 May 1964 in Kabul, Afghanistan, as delegates of Brunei. In July, he announced that five villages in the Belait District—Sungai Liang, Lumut, Kuala Balai, Labi, and Bukit Sawat—would soon have community halls, funded with $40,000 under the Rural District Development Plan, to host social gatherings, meetings, and welfare activities. Later that year, on 21 November, he officiated the opening of Melilas Malay School.

During the third Belait District Council meeting on 5 June 1965, Pengiran Abdul Momin announced the construction of a rest house in Labi to accommodate government officers on official duties in the area. He also outlined plans for three community halls in Sungai Teraban, Sukang, and Melilas, along with additional rest houses in Bukit Sawat and Melilas. A community hall and another rest house were also scheduled for construction in Kuala Belait. In addition, a 20-mile (32 km) road linking Sukang to Bukit Sawat was set for immediate construction, with completion expected within the year.

As chairman of the Belait District Council meeting in December 1966, Pengiran Abdul Momin provided clarification on the efforts undertaken by the local agricultural office in response to concerns about the Batu 3 experimental farm in Seria. Later, in October 1967, he accompanied the acting chief minister, Pengiran Muhammad Yusuf, on a visit to development projects in Kuala Belait. During the visit, they inspected the proposed site for a new $13 million hospital to replace the existing one, along with proposed sites for a vocational school, a secondary school, a turbine gas power plant, a community hall, and two relocation projects.

In 1969, Pengiran Abdul Momin was transferred to the State Secretary's Office to serve as acting assistant state secretary of Brunei. On 23 July of that year, he became the acting state secretary of Brunei while the incumbent, Taib Besar, was on leave, before resuming his position as district officer of Kuala Belait from 2 September until 1 October. Pengiran Abdul Momin was appointed as state secretary of Brunei on 25 March 1970, with the sultan's approval, and officiated the opening of Anggerek Desa Malay School on 2 July 1970. He was appointed as acting chief minister of Brunei from 16 to 31 August, while the incumbent, Pengiran Muhammad Yusuf, was on an official visit to Japan, and again served as acting chief minister from 5 November 1970 until the latter's return to Brunei. His tenure as state secretary concluded on 15 May 1972.

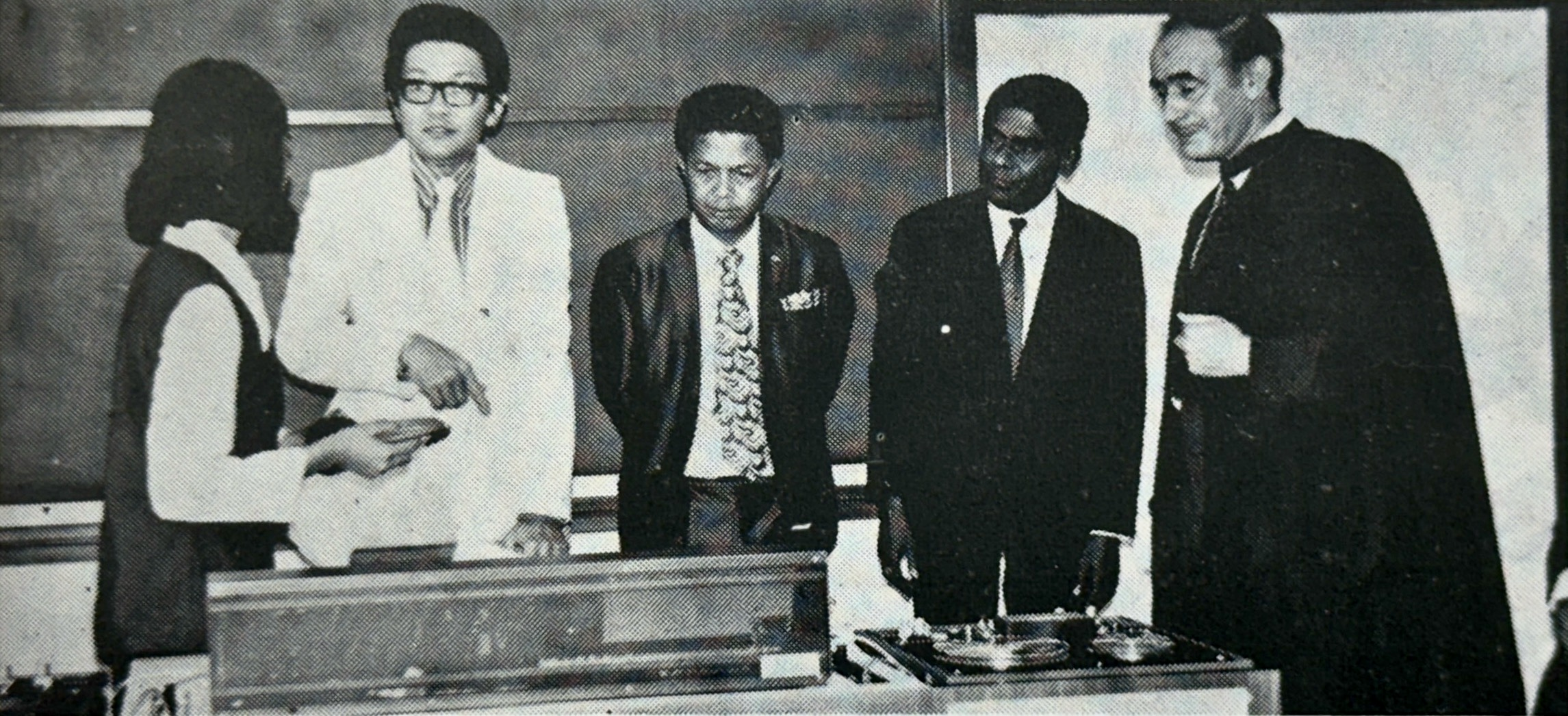
Isa Ibrahim and Pengiran Abdul Momin (second and third from the left) visiting the Sultan Hassanal Bolkiah Teachers College in 1973

On 15 July 1972, Pengiran Abdul Momin was appointed as acting chief minister of Brunei and was officially confirmed in the position on 1 July 1974. The declaration and presentation ceremony for his commissioning letter as chief minister was held on 26 April 1975. He officiated the opening of the new Bendahara Sakam Malay School building in Kampong Bunut on 27 June 1976. On 19 November 1976, he clarified that Bank Darussalam had not been licensed to operate in the country, despite claims in the press, and also welcomed the opening of Kalimantan Finance and Investment Berhad's new branch in Bangar as the area's first financial centre. He completed his tenure as chief minister on 31 August 1981.

== Diplomatic career ==
After completing his tenure as chief minister, Pengiran Abdul Momin began his diplomatic career, serving as Brunei's high commissioner to Malaysia from 1989 to 1990 and as non-resident high commissioner to India from 1990 to 1993, presenting his credentials to President Ramaswamy Venkataraman on 24 November 1990. From 1993 to 1995, he was also Brunei's non-resident high commissioner to China. He served as the country's permanent representative to the United Nations from 1994 to 1995. He was later succeeded by Mohammad Daud.

== Legislative councillor ==
Pengiran Abdul Momin was initially appointed to the newly revived LegCo on 6 September 2004. He emphasised the importance of listening to the needs and concerns of the people during the LegCo session on 27 September. He expressed a shared desire for peace and prosperity in the country, hoping it would serve as an example to others and prayed for the fulfilment of the sultan's wishes. He then raised concerns about blocked drains on the roads during another session on the following day. He called for those responsible to address the issue. Not long after, the dissolution of the LegCo occurred on 1 September 2005, Pengiran Abdul Momin was reappointed as one of its new members, with the appointments taking effect on 2 September 2005. He took the oath swearing ceremony on the 25 September.

During the LegCo session in March 2006, Pengiran Abdul Momin raised several concerns. He highlighted the delay in salary payments for qualified applicants working under the government's Public Service Commission (PSC), suggesting that the issue may be due to administrative inefficiencies within the Legal Department or the PSC. He also proposed that discussions on government budgets should not be widely publicised, as disclosing sensitive budgetary information could negatively impact national interests. Furthermore, Pengiran Abdul Momin inquired about the progress of various road repair projects, questioning whether the allocated budgets for these initiatives in 2005 and 2006 had been fully utilised. Lastly, he expressed interest in the plan to improve Jalan Residency with a budget of $25,000,000,000, asking if the improvements would extend from Kianggeh Bridge to Jalan Residency, while raising concerns about parking issues along the road.

During the LegCo session in March 2007, Pengiran Abdul Momin proposed that sensitive budget allocations for the Ministry of Defence should not be publicly disclosed, stressing the need to maintain confidentiality regarding defence strategies, procurement details, and troop numbers to safeguard national security. He also sought clarification on the annual budget allocation process for each ministry, questioning whether it was thoroughly discussed and agreed upon, the percentage increase in allocations each year, and the proportion designated for staff salaries versus development projects, while ultimately expressing support for the proposed budget. Additionally, he inquired about the progress of the 8th National Development Plan, raising concerns over the lack of clear updates on expenditure status and completed projects.

== Death and funeral ==
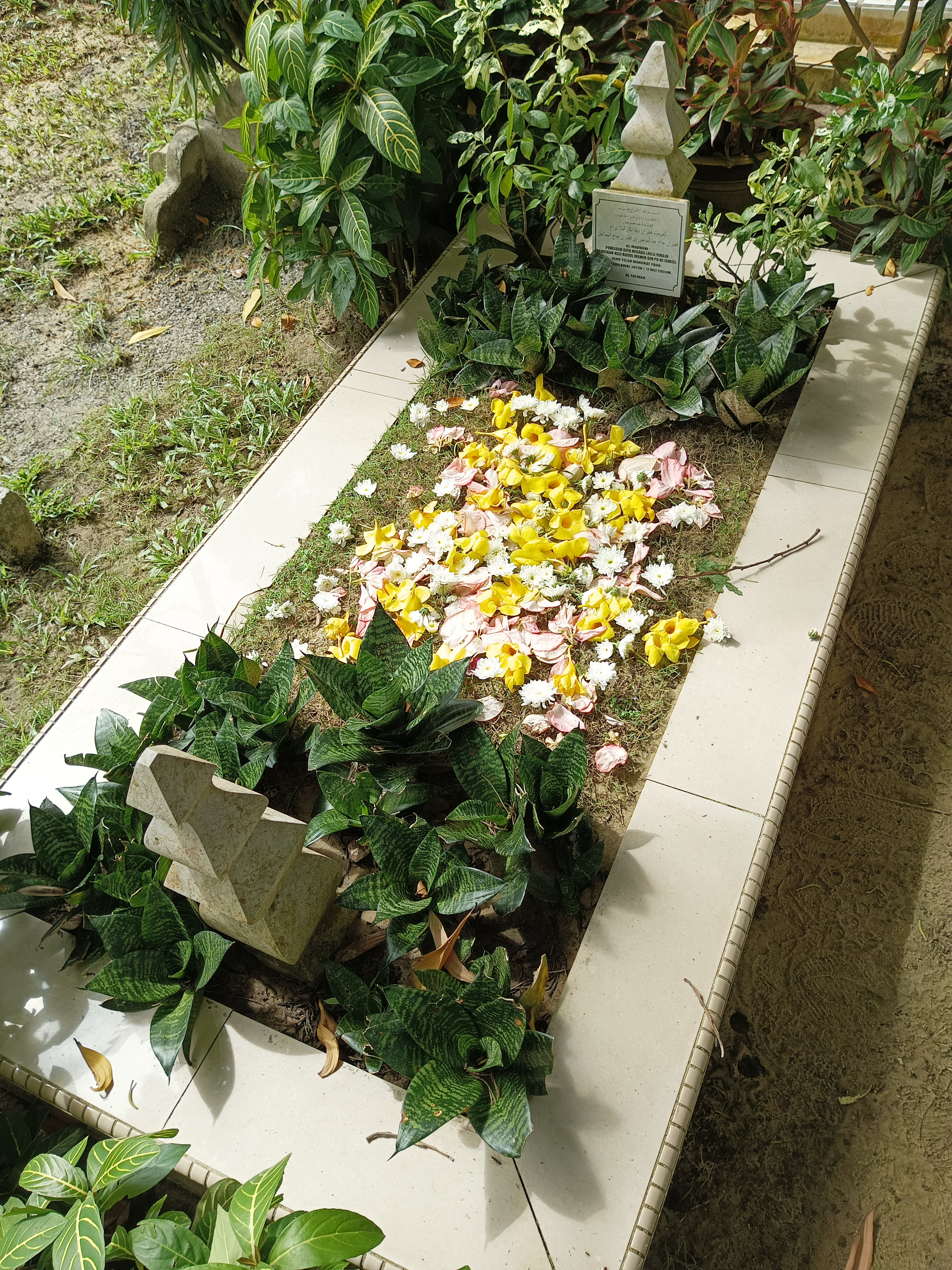
Grave of Pengiran Abdul Momin at Kampong Telanai Muslim Cemetery

Pengiran Abdul Momin died at the age of 80 at his residence in Kampong Telanai on 17 May 2008. His funeral was attended by Sultan Hassanal Bolkiah and Pengiran Anak Abdul Aziz, who joined the congregational funeral prayer led by Abdul Aziz Juned at his residence. He was later laid to rest at Kampong Telanai Muslim Cemetery.

== Personal life ==
Pengiran Abdul Momin married Datin Dayang Hajah Masnah binti Haji Mohd Yusuf in 1947, and together they had five children—two sons and three daughters. Among them are Pengiran Mohd Yassin, Pengiran Noraini, and Pengiran Mariana.

== Titles, styles and honours ==
=== Titles and styles ===
Personal standard of Pengiran Dipa Negara Laila Diraja

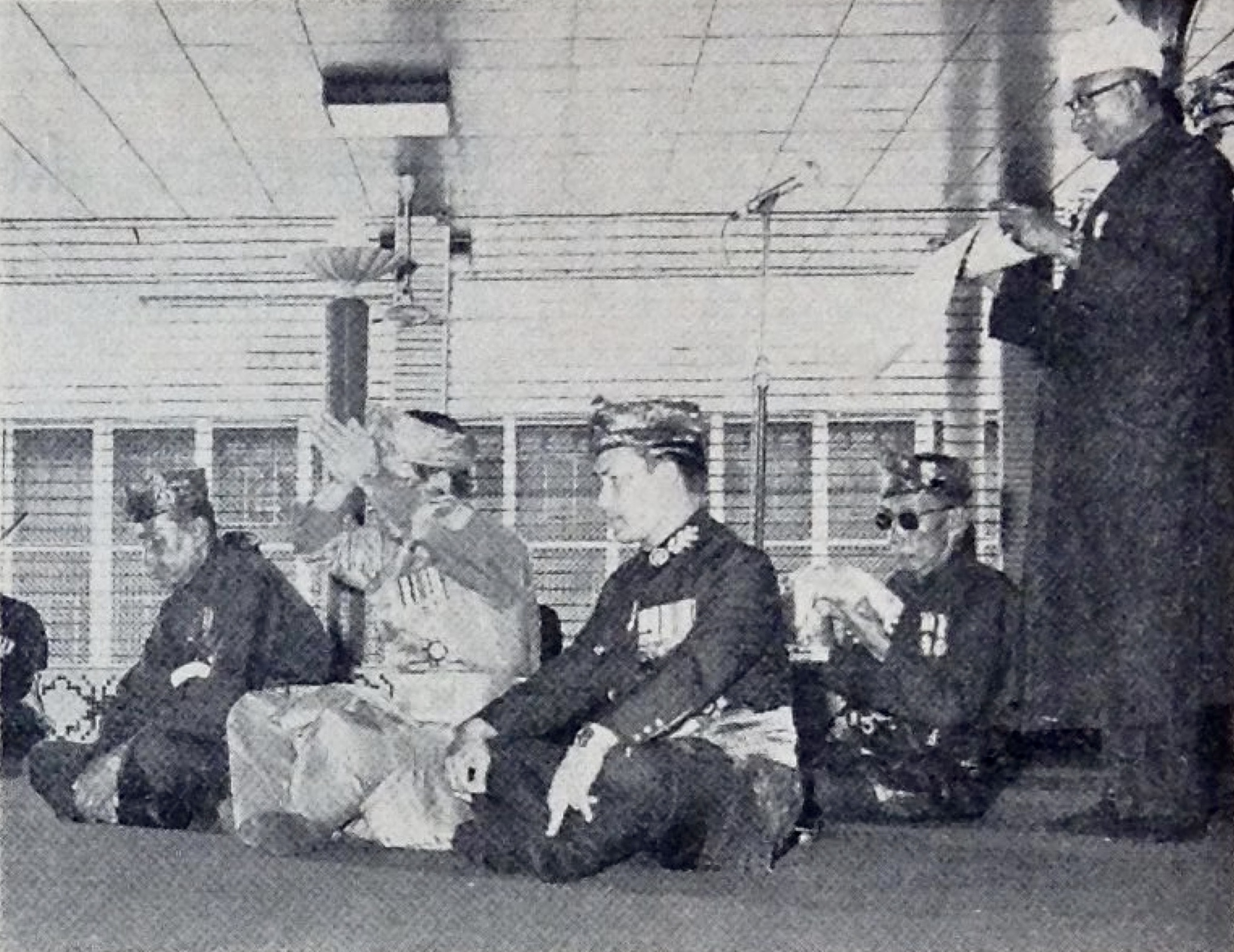
Pengiran Abdul Momin (second from the left) at the title bestowment ceremony held at the Lapau in 1970

On 25 June 1970, Pengiran Abdul Momin was honoured by Sultan Hassanal Bolkiah with the cheteria title of Pengiran Dipa Negara Laila Diraja, bearing the style Yang Amat Mulia.

=== Honours ===
Pengiran Abdul Momin has been bestowed the following honours:

National

- Family Order of Laila Utama (DK; 15 July 1972) – Dato Laila Utama
- Order of Seri Paduka Mahkota Brunei Second Class (DPMB; 12 February 1969) – Dato Paduka
- Order of Seri Paduka Mahkota Brunei Third Class (SMB; 23 September 1965)
- Order of Setia Negara Brunei Second Class (DSNB; 15 July 1973) – Dato Setia
- Omar Ali Saifuddin Medal Second Class (POAS; 25 September 1963)
- Sultan Hassanal Bolkiah Medal (PHBS; 15 July 1971)
- Pingat Bakti Laila Ikhlas (PBLI)
- Meritorious Service Medal (PJK; 15 July 1970)
- Long Service Medal (PKL; 2 August 1967)
- Campaign Medal (17 April 1965)

Foreign

- United Kingdom:
  - Lieutenant of the Royal Victorian Order (LVO)
  - Member of the Royal Victorian Order (MVO)

=== Things named after him ===
- Jalan Dipa Negara, a road in Kampong Mumong

== Notes ==
Diplomatic posts
Preceded by Office established	Permanent Representative of Brunei to the United Nations; 1994–1995	Succeeded by Mohammad Daud
Preceded by Office established	High Commissioner of Brunei to Malaysia; 1989–1990	Succeeded by Pengiran Jaya
Political offices
Preceded by Pengiran Muhammad Yusuf	4th Menteri Besar of Brunei; 1 July 1974 – August 1981	Succeeded by Abdul Aziz Umar (acting)
Preceded by Taib Besar (acting)	4th State Secretary of Brunei; 25 March 1970 – 15 May 1972	Succeeded by Matnor McAfee (acting)
