= Raja Azam =

Malaysian civil servant (1918–1999)

Yang Mulia Dato' Seri Raja Azam Raja Kamaralzaman SPMP DPMB DPMT SMS
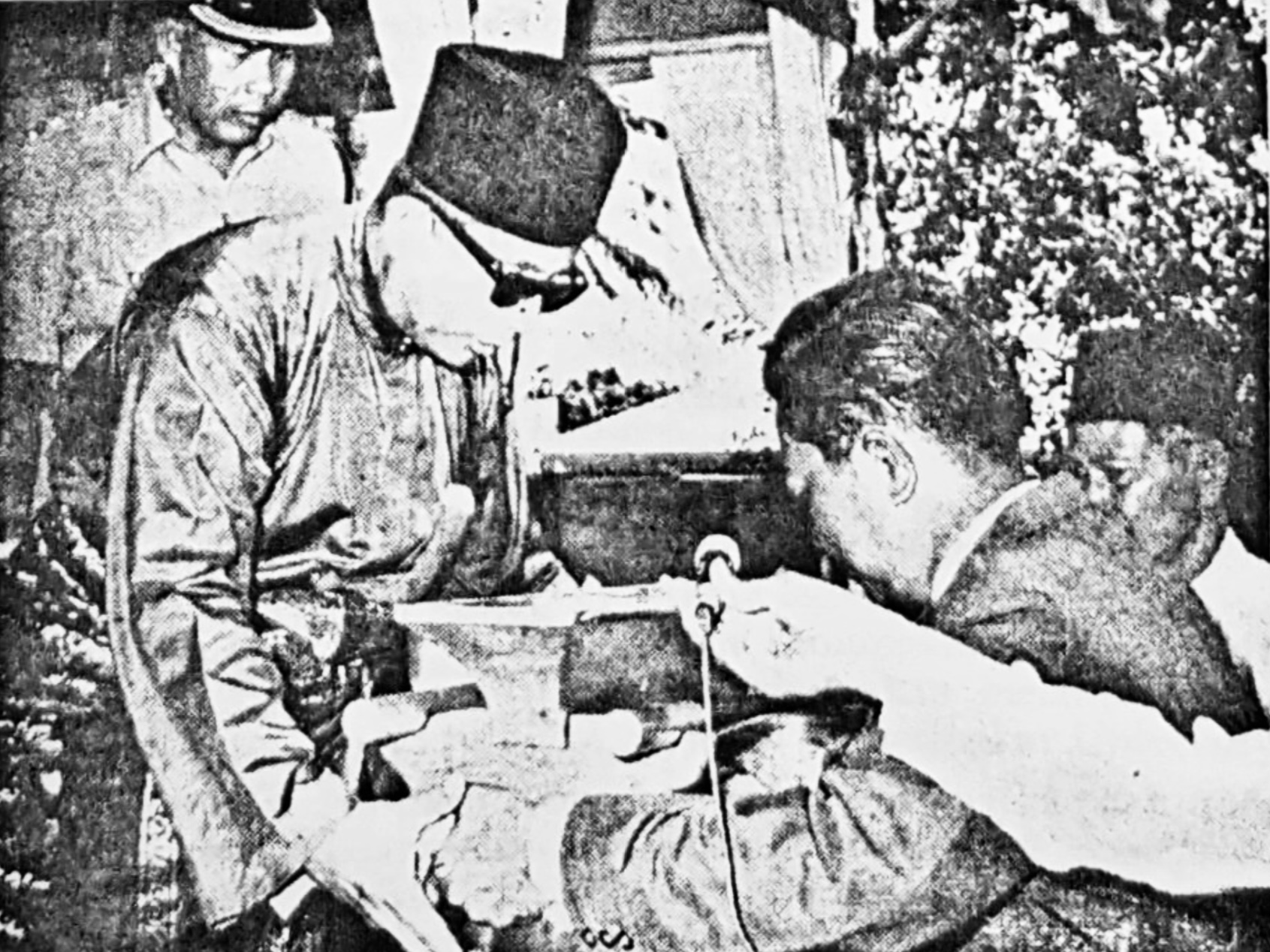
- Raja Azam (right) receiving a gift in 1963

2nd State Secretary of Brunei
- In office 1 January 1962 – 18 January 1964
- Monarch: Omar Ali Saifuddien III
- Deputy: Pengiran Muhammad Yusuf
- Preceded by: Wan Ahmad Umar
- Succeeded by: Pengiran Muhammad Yusuf

State Secretary of Negeri Sembilan
- In office 1960–1962
- Monarchs: Tuanku Abdul Rahman; Tuanku Munawir
- Prime Minister: Tunku Abdul Rahman

Personal details
- Born: Raja Azam bin Raja Kamaralzaman; 13 July 1918 Kuala Dipang, Kinta (now present-day Kampar), Perak, British Malaya
- Died: 1999 (aged 80–81) Kuala Lumpur, Malaysia
- Profession: Civil servant

Raja Azam bin Raja Kamaralzaman (13 July 1918 – 1999), simply known as Raja Azam, was a Malaysian nobleman and politician whom formerly held the position of state secretary of Negeri Sembilan from 1960 to 1962, and State Secretary of Brunei from 1962 to 1964.

== Early life and career ==
On 13 July 1918 Raja Azam was born in Kuala Dipang, Kampar, Perak (then a part of the undivided Kinta District). He was the lone child of Raja Nasibah binti Raja Ismail and Raja Di-Hilir Kamaralzaman ibni Raja Mansur. He attended the Malay College in Kuala Kangsar, where his father also received his education, and where he served as head boy. He claimed, "From the start, we knew that we were being groomed for administrative positions," in a 1996 interview with the Sunday Star. A foundational course was given to him, including history, math, and English. After earning his Senior Cambridge in 1938 he continued his education at Raffles College in Singapore, where he graduated with a certificate in administrative studies.

== Career ==
Raja Azam started his career in the administrative service in 1942, and the Taiping Land Office was one of his first employers. He had stated in the aforementioned interview that a government worker was supposed to be adaptable and that "(one) had to know the law very well as administrators often beckoned the role of magistrates." He was integrated into the Malayan Civil Service (MCS) by 1952. Raja Azam has previously held the positions of District Officer in Kuala Langat, Selangor, and Commissioner of Lands and Mines in Perlis. Following independence, he served as the State Secretary of Negeri Sembilan from 1960 to 1962 under the tutelage of Tuanku Abdul Rahman and Tuanku Munawir. From 1962 to 1964, he served as the State Secretary of Brunei at the invitation of Sultan Sir Omar Ali Saifuddien III to assist in the development of the Brunei civil service.

As a representative of the Sultan of Brunei he officiated the opening of the Temburong District's penghulu and ketua kampong course on 11 July 1963. Residents of the district presented him gifts. Accompanied by Jaya Rajid, he was given an introduction by the district officer to the participants in the course, held in Bangar. On 20 January 1963, he left Brunei for Malaya by plane after assisting the Bruneian government for two years. The Sultan and other officials sent their farewell at Berakas Airport, with Yusuf Abdul Rahman taking over his position.

From 1967 until 1971 Raja Azam served as Secretary-General in the Ministry of Transport before returning to Malaysia. Tun Abdul Razak asked him to leave the Ministry of Transportation so that he could head the Port Swettenham (now Port Klang) Authority from 1971 to 1977. Later, in 1978, he became the director of Keretapi Tanah Melayu.

== Death ==
In 1999 Raja Azam died.

== Personal life ==
Raja Azam was married to Raja Fatimah binti Raja Zainal Azman, the granddaughter of Raja Sir Chulan. He was the father of three daughters and five sons.

== Honours ==
Raja Azam earned the following honours;

=== National ===
- Order of the Perak State Crown Knight Grand Commander (SPMP) – Dato' Seri
- Order of the Crown of Terengganu Knight Commander (DPMT) – Dato' Paduka
- Order of the Crown of Selangor Companion (SMS)
- Distinguished Conduct Medal (PPT)
- Meritorious Service Medal (PJK)
- Johan Mangku Negara (JMN)

=== Foreign ===
- Brunei:
  - Order of Seri Paduka Mahkota Brunei Second Class (DPMB) – Dato Paduka

Political offices
Preceded by Wan Ahmad Umar	2nd State Secretary of Brunei; 1 January 1962 – 18 January 1964	Succeeded by Pengiran Muhammad Yusuf
