= Pengiran Anak Siti Saerah =

Bruneian nobility (1928–2013)

Pengiran Anak Siti Saerah ستي سائرة
- Born: 8 May 1931; Brunei Town, Brunei
- Died: 4 November 2013 (aged 82); Jerudong Park Medical Centre, Brunei–Muara, Brunei
- Burial: Royal Mausoleum, Bandar Seri Begawan, Brunei
- Spouse: Muhammad Ali Tamin (m. 1949) Tengku Muhammad Khalid Shah (divorced)
- Issue: Pengiran Anak Nur Asikin; Pengiran Anak Nur Akmar
- House: Bolkiah
- Father: Ahmad Tajuddin
- Mother: Kadayang Amas
- Religion: Islam

Pengiran Anak Siti Saerah (8 May 1931 – 4 November 2013), also referred to as Balabab Besar, was the eldest child and daughter of Sultan Ahmad Tajuddin and Kadayang Amas. Additionally, she was the eldest granddaughter of Sultan Muhammad Jamalul Alam II and Raja Isteri Fatimah, and first cousin to the current Brunei's Sultan Hassanal Bolkiah.

== Personal life ==
Born at Brunei Town in 1928, to Sultan Ahmad Tajuddin and his non-royal wife, Kadayang Amas binti Ampuan Salleh (born in Kampong Sultan Lama). Pengiran Anak Siti Saerah had two younger sisters, Pengiran Anak Siti Zubaidah and Pengiran Anak Siti Halimah. She along with her sisters were not children of their father's recognised queen consort, Tengku Raihani.

Pengiran Anak Siti Saerah was educated at St. George's School on Jalan Tutong; then employed by the Royal Customs and Excise Department as an officer after working as a nurse. Started an entrepreneur after leaving the government. She, her brothers, and their father hid from the Japanese during World War II by going deep into the jungle.

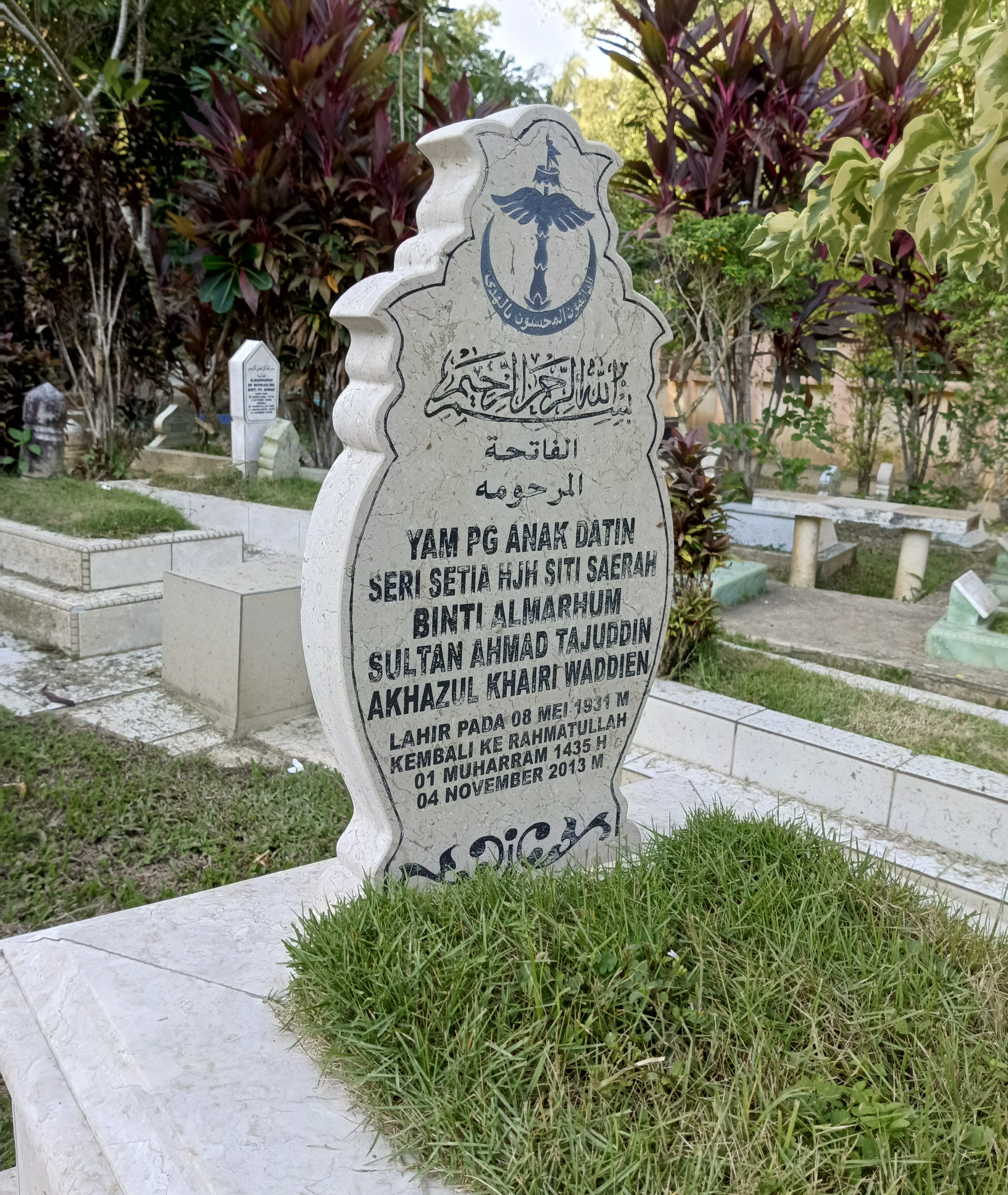
Pengiran Anak Siti Saerah's grave at the Royal Mausoleum, Bandar Seri Begawan

Due to health issues, Siti Saerah died in the Jerudong Park Medical Centre on 4 November 2013, at around 9:41 p.m., at the age of 82. On the following morning, her funeral was held at her residence in Jalan Ong Sum Ping, and was laid to rest at the Royal Mausoleum in Bandar Seri Begawan.

== Marriage and children ==
In 1949, Pengiran Anak Siti Saerah married Muhammad Ali bin Tamin; they had four children. At the time of her death, she had four daughters, three sons, thirty-three grandchildren, and thirty-seven great-grandchildren. Together with Tengku Muhammad Khalid Shah, they had 2 children:

- Yang Amat Mulia Pengiran Anak Nur Asikin
- Yang Amat Mulia Pengiran Anak Nur Akmar

== Honours ==
Pengiran Anak Siti Saerah was given the following honours:

- Order of Setia Negara Brunei First Class (PSNB) – Datin Seri Setia
- Excellent Service Medal (PIKB)
- Long Service Medal (PKL)
- Sultan of Brunei Silver Jubilee Medal (5 October 1992)
