= Johar Noordin =

Bruneian politician (1942– 2020)

Dato Paduka Johar Noordin DPMB
- جوهر نوردين
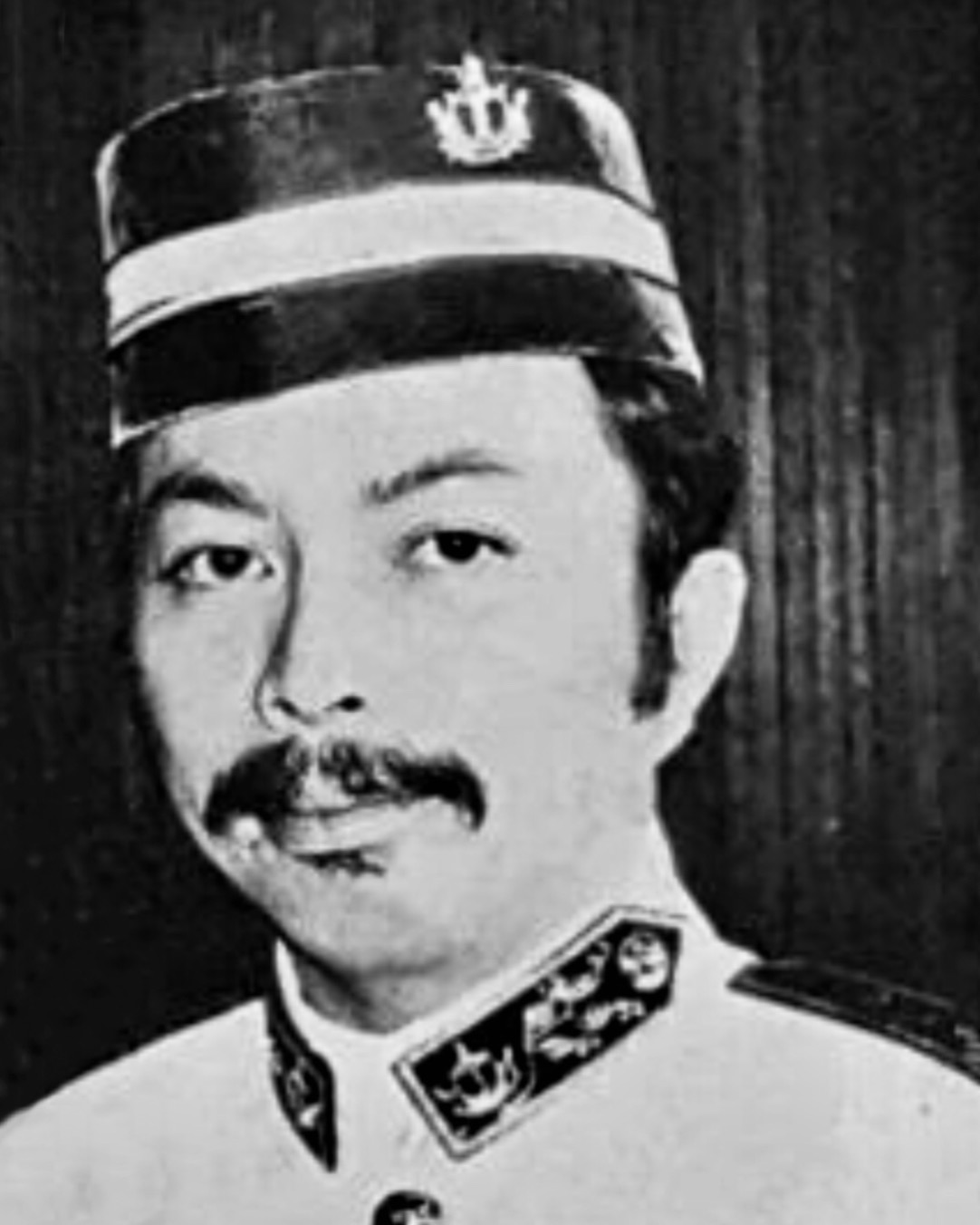

2nd Minister of Health
- In office 20 October 1986 – 25 March 1998
- Monarch: Hassanal Bolkiah
- Preceded by: Abdul Aziz Umar
- Succeeded by: Abdul Aziz Umar (Acting)

Personal details
- Born: 21 October 1942 Kampong Bendahara Lama, Kampong Ayer, Brunei
- Died: 12 June 2020 (aged 77)
- Resting place: Telanai 'B' Muslim Cemetery, Bandar Seri Begawan, Brunei
- Education: University of Glasgow (MBChB); University of London
- Profession: Politician; physician

Johar bin Haji Noordin (27 July 1942 – 12 June 2020), simply known as Dato Dr Johar, was a Bruneian physician and politician who formerly took office as the second Minister of Health from 1986 to 2002. Notably, he was among the first local doctors in the country.

== Education ==
Johar was a member of a group that took the Higher School Certs in Brunei, which was also the first group to ever take the exam. There were five of them; they were Dato Joe Lim, Dato Sherlock Chin, Dato Johar, Dato Samuel Yapp Kai San, and Dato Hussin Daud. They were the first set of native Bruneian doctors. Since we had a harder time getting into the university and had to spend a lot more time there, their pay at the time was only B$1,100 when they returned. When they returned, their compensation was the same as any graduate, whether they were in the arts or sciences. He received his MBChB in 1968, became the first native student from Brunei Town, Borneo to attend the University of Glasgow and graduate. Later on he obtained University of London's diploma in Tropical Public Health.

== Career ==
Johar was appointed as the health minister on 20 October 1986, succeeding Pehin Dato Abdul Aziz. From 21 to 24 July 1987, he was the representative to attend the International AIDS Conference Ministerial Meeting on AIDS. On 1 May 1995, the Committee on Nominations, made up of representatives from the World Health Organization (WHO) member states, convened. The Committee decided to nominate Dato Johar for the position of President of the 48th World Health Assembly at Palais des Nations in accordance with Rule 25 of the Health Assembly's Rules of Procedure and in keeping with the Assembly's long-standing practice of regional rotation in this regard. On 25 March 1998, he was fired after serving 14 years and reportedly due to his ineffective reaction to the haze over Brunei brought on by forest fires in Indonesia and Malaysia.

== Personal life ==
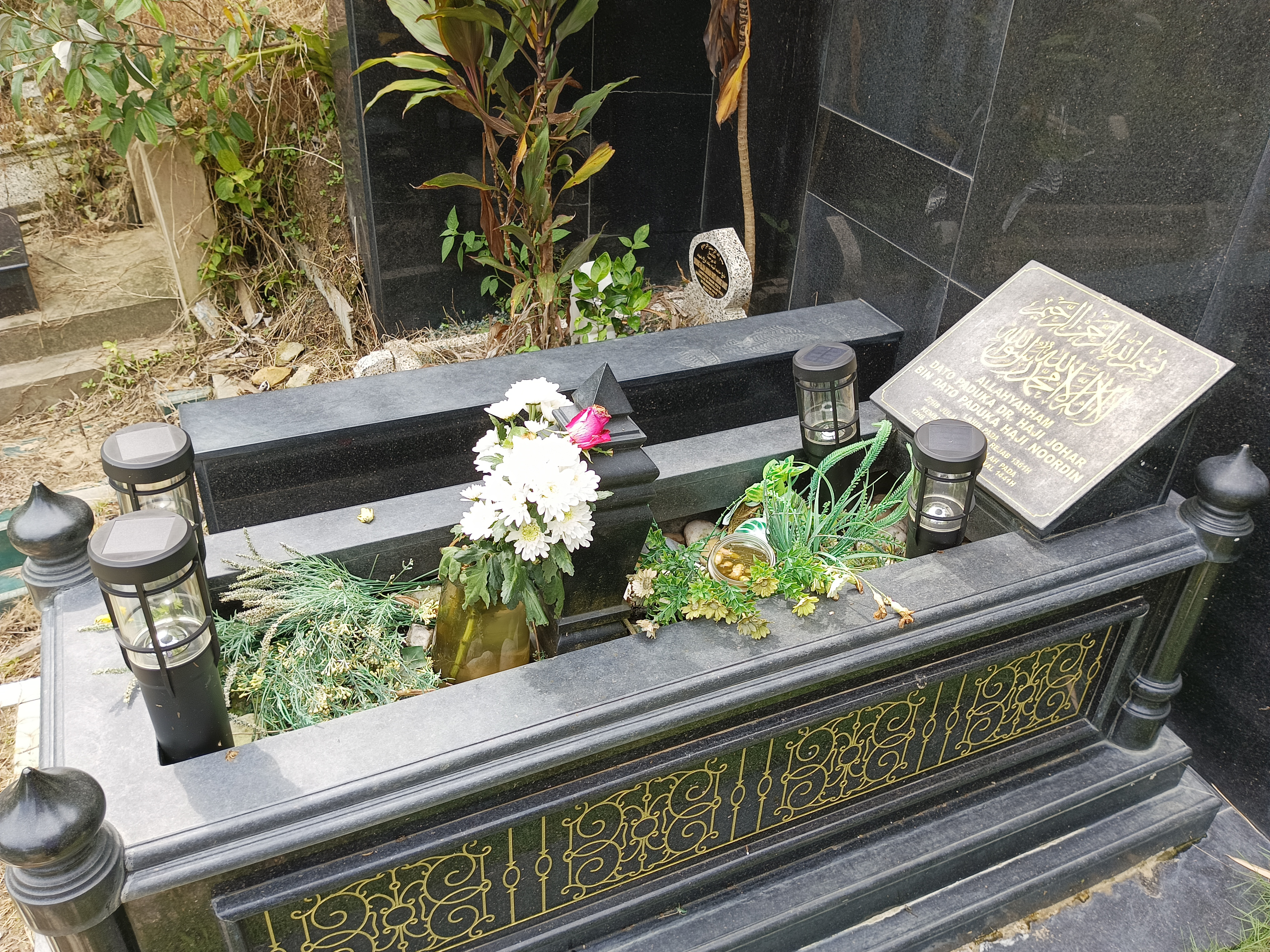
Grave of Dato Johar Noordin at Telanai Muslim Cemetery

Johar's children included; Sofian (Head of Electrophysiology at the Gleneagles JPMC and President of the Cardiac Society Brunei Darussalam) and Johan (Chief Corporate Strategy Officer with Brunei LNG).

== Honours ==
On 15 November 2007, Sultan Hassanal Bolkiah gave 27 founders outstanding recognition awards, and individuals who had made significant contributions to Brunei's healthcare system—including Johar—were honored during the event. He has earned the following honours:

- Order of Seri Paduka Mahkota Brunei Second Class (DPMB) – Dato Paduka

Political offices
Preceded by Abdul Aziz Umar	2nd Minister of Health; 20 October 1986 – 25 March 1998	Succeeded by Abdul Aziz Umar (Acting)
