= St. George's School, Brunei =

St George's School

Location
- 11 Jalan Kumbang Pasang; Bandar Seri Begawan, Brunei-Muara, BA1512; Brunei
- Coordinates: 4°53′43.6″N 114°56′20.2″E

Information
- Type: Private school
- Motto: Honour and Labour
- Religious affiliation: Roman Catholic
- Established: 1937
- Founder: George Newn Ah Foott
- Executive headteacher: Anthony Liew
- Grades: Kindergarten to Year Eleven
- Gender: Co-educational
- Language: English and Malay (Brunei Malay)
- Website: www.stgeorges.edu.bn

St George's School is a private, Roman Catholic, co-educational school in Bandar Seri Begawan, Brunei-Muara, Brunei. It was established in 1937.

== History ==
George Newn Ah Foott was adamant that education might give the many populations in Brunei Town, a brighter future. Newn took the initiative to open Saint George's School after seeing the lack of educational options and schools in the area. Fr. Piet de Wit, a local priest, first established the school in a house on Jalan Padang that Mr. Kay leased. In addition, this home housed the priest's residence and a chapel. Thanks to Newn's donation of land, the school was able to construct its first dedicated structure in Kumbang Pasang in 1941. Following World War II's interruptions, the school was reopened under Newn's leadership, with his daughters acting as instructors. Later, the school was named after him as a sign of respect.

In contrast to the contemporary concrete structures it now enjoys, Saint George's School was a modest thatch building with an attap roof in its early years. It became one of Brunei's most prominent schools as it grew over time to provide instruction up to the GCE "O" Level. In 1972, Newn received the Papal Decoration "Pro Ecclesia et Pontifice" in honour of his contributions to Saint George's School and his services to the Catholic Church.

== Notable alumni ==
- Yassin Affandi (1922–2012), politician and rebel
- Zaini Ahmad (born 1935), rebel and writer
- Pengiran Abdul Momin (1927–2008), civil servant and diplomat
- Pengiran Mokhtar Puteh (1929–2016), civil servant
- Pengiran Umar (1940–2023), police commissioner
- Steven Chong Wan Oon, chief justice
- Pengiran Anak Siti Saerah (1922–2013), nobility
- Abdul Aziz Umar (born 1936), civil servant and politician
- Roderick Yong (born 1932), diplomat and educator
