= Prime Minister of Brunei =

Head of government

- Perdana Menteri Brunei ڤردان منتري بروني
- Emblem of Brunei

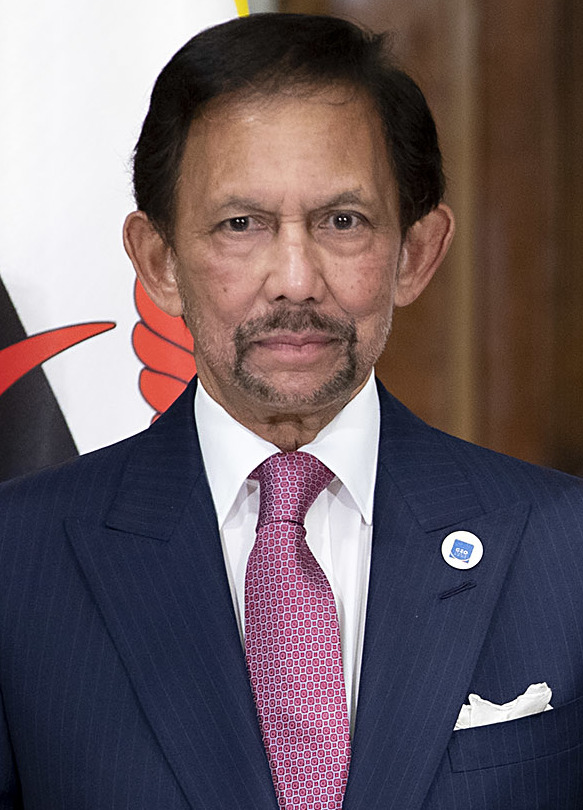
- Incumbent; Hassanal Bolkiah since 1 January 1984
- Government of Brunei; Prime Minister's Office
- Style: His Majesty
- Type: head of government
- Member of: Prime Minister's Office; Council of Cabinet Ministers; Legislative Council of Brunei; Privy Council of Brunei; Council of Succession; Religious Council of Brunei
- Seat: Prime Minister's Office, Bandar Seri Begawan
- Appointer: Hassanal Bolkiah; as Sultan of Brunei
- Term length: At His Majesty's pleasure
- Constituting instrument: Constitution of Brunei
- Formation: 29 September 1959; 67 years ago as Chief Minister; 1 January 1984; 42 years ago as Prime Minister
- First holder: Ibrahim Mohammad Jahfar as Chief Minister; Hassanal Bolkiah as Prime Minister
- Deputy: Senior Minister of Brunei
- Website: http://www.pmo.gov.bn

The prime minister of Brunei (Malay: Perdana Menteri Brunei; Jawi: ڤردان منتري بروني) is the head of government of Brunei. Concurrently, the title is held by the sultan of Brunei, who as sultan is also the head of state of the country. The prime minister, minister of finance and economy, and minister of defence are all the Sultan of Brunei.

He is Brunei's Supreme Executive Authority in his capacity as the Sultan and Yang Di-Pertuan. The Privy Council, the Council of Succession, the Religious Council, the Council of Cabinet Ministers, and the Legislative Council support him in carrying out his responsibilities.

== History ==
=== Chief minister ===
The Supplementary Protectorate Agreement in 1906 was repealed and the Residential system was abolished as part of the 1959 Agreement between Brunei and the United Kingdom. As a result, the position of high commissioner took the role of the resident post, which was eliminated. The position of menteri besar (chief minister) was established in replacement of a resident and is headed by the sultan. Its duties include exercising executive authority inside the state.

The Sultan of Brunei was given ultimate executive control over the state, according to one of the key clauses of the 1959 Constitution. The Chief Minister, and the State Secretary, who were required by law to be Malay people who practiced Shafeite Islam, were the two most important officials the monarch could choose to assist him in running the state.

The former State Council was replaced by the Executive Council (now Council of Cabinet Ministers) and Legislative Council, and the sultan had ultimate administrative authority in the state under the terms of the new constitution, which was proclaimed on 29 September 1959. The Chief Minister, the State Secretary, the Attorney General, and the State Finance Officer were the four most significant officers in the state's administration.

On 20 December 1962, with the establishment of the Emergency Council (Majlis Darurat), the Executive Council (Majlis Mesyuarat Kerajaan) was temporarily replaced by the Emergency Executive Committee (Malay: Jawatankuasa Kerja Darurat). This committee was established in response to the Brunei People's Party-led uprising in 1962 and given the authority to support the nation's administration, which had been disrupted by the uprising. In the process, the committee also set aside money for the British Army, who had been called in to put down the uprising, to have accommodation and other amenities. Marsal Maun, the then-Chief Minister, presided over the committee.

Sultan Omar Ali Saifuddien III established the Royal Commission in relation to the notion of Federation of Malaysia's creation. It was also chaired by Chief Minister Marshal Maun, along with a number of community representatives.

=== Prime minister ===
As soon as Brunei declared its independence from the United Kingdom on 1 January 1984, the office was established. The position of perdana menteri (prime minister) took the role of the Chief Minister. As per the requirements of its predecessor, the individual needs to be a Malay Muslim. Sultan Hassanal Bolkiah became the first prime minister of Brunei.

It seems customary for government ministers to ask for, or receive a request for, a private meeting with the Sultan instead than assembling at a table overseen by him. "Primus inter pares" refers to him in the audience as their sovereign rather than as a prime minister. The ultimate executive power is not with a "Prime Minister," but with "His Majesty the Sultan and Yang Di-Pertuan". Although it is tangential to the connection and engagement with a specific minister, the sultan's role as prime minister serves as an example of his authority.

== List of leaders ==
Symbols

Acting officeholder

No.	Portrait	Name	Took office	Left office	Time in office	Monarch	Ref
Chief Minister
1		Pehin Datu Perdana Manteri; Dato Laila Utama; Ibrahim Mohammad Jahfar إبراهيم محمد جهفر (1902–1971)	29 September 1959	1 August 1961	1 year, 306 days	Omar Ali Saifuddien III	
2		Dato Seri Paduka; Marsal Maun مرسل ماون (1913–2000); Acting from 1 August 1961	1 September 1962	4 November 1968	6 years, 64 days	Omar Ali Saifuddien III	
3		Pengiran Setia Negara; Pengiran Muhammad Yusuf ڤڠيرن محمد يوسف (1923–2016); Acting from 1 June 1967	4 November 1968	15 July 1972	3 years, 254 days	Hassanal Bolkiah	
4		Pengiran Dipa Negara Laila Diraja; Pengiran Abdul Momin ڤڠيرن عبدالمومين (1927–2008); Acting from 15 July 1972	1 July 1974	31 August 1981	7 years, 61 days	Hassanal Bolkiah	
–		Pehin Orang Kaya Laila Wijaya; Dato Seri Setia; Abdul Aziz Umar عبدالعزيز عمر (b.1936)	1 September 1981	31 December 1983	2 years, 121 days	Hassanal Bolkiah	
Prime Minister
1		His Majesty; Hassanal Bolkiah حسن البلقية (b.1946)	1 January 1984	Incumbent	42 years, 289 days	Hassanal Bolkiah	

== Rank by time in office ==
Rank	Chief Minister/Sultan	Time in office
1	Hassanal Bolkiah (Incumbent)	42 years, 289 days
2	Pengiran Abdul Momin	7 years, 61 days
5	Marsal Maun	6 years, 64 days
3	Pengiran Muhammad Yusuf	3 years, 254 days
4	Ibrahim Mohammad Jahfar	1 year, 306 days

== Prime Minister's Office ==
The Prime Minister's Office of Brunei is located near the Edinburgh Palace (Istana Edinburgh) in Airport Lama, Berakas northeast of Bandar Seri Begawan.

== See also ==
- Government of Brunei
- Politics of Brunei
