= Government of Brunei =

National government

Government of Brunei Darussalam
- Central government

Overview
- Established: 1 January 1984; 42 years ago
- State: Brunei Darussalam
- Leader: Sultan, Yang di-Pertuan and Prime Minister
- Leader Name: Hassanal Bolkiah
- Annual budget: ▼$6.3 billion BND
- Headquarters: Bandar Seri Begawan, Brunei Darussalam
- Website: www.gov.bn

The Government of Brunei Darussalam is the real government created by the constitution of Brunei whereby the Sultan of Brunei is both head of state and head of government (Prime Minister of Brunei). Executive power is exercised by the government. Brunei Darussalam (frequently abbreviated to Brunei for brevity) has a legislative council with 36 appointed members, that only has consultative tasks. Under Brunei's 1959 constitution, Sultan Hassanal Bolkiah is the head of state with full executive authority, including emergency powers since 1962. The Sultan's role is enshrined in the national philosophy known as 'Melayu Islam Beraja' (MIB), or Malay Islamic Monarchy. The country has been under hypothetical martial law since a rebellion occurred in the early 1960s, and was put down by British forces based in Singapore. The Seat of the Government is located in Bandar Seri Begawan, the capital city of Brunei.

== Ministers and departments ==
The Deputy Menteri Besar (Chief Minister) assists the chief executive officer, who is known as the Menteri Besar. The state secretary, the attorney general, and the state financial officer are the three senior critical officials. The state financial officer is in charge of the treasury, the attorney general is in charge of the Criminal Prosecution Department, and the state secretary oversees all administrative matters with the assistance of an assistant state secretary. The heads of the state departments oversee the other departments, and they are required to confer with the state secretary prior to carrying out any projects or proposals. This holds true for the district as well.

Each state department has a branch in a district, and these branches report to the head of the department in charge at the department headquarters. The relevant district officers will function in this capacity in districts without such branches. The penghulus, ketua kampongs and assistant district officers themselves report to the District Officers.

== Judicial branch ==
Brunei has a dual legal system. The first is the system inherited from the British, similar to the ones found in India, Malaysia and Singapore. It is based on the English common law, but with codification of a significant part of it. The common law legal system covers most of Brunei's laws.

The structure of the common law courts in Brunei starts with the magistracy. There are currently less than 10 magistrates for the country, all of whom are locals. A rung above the magistracy is the intermediate courts. This was set up to be a training ground for the local. There are currently two intermediate court judges, both are locals.

The High Court of the Supreme Court currently consist of three judges, two of whom are locals. The Chief Justice is a High Court of Hong Kong judge.

There is no jury system in Brunei; a judge or magistrate sits alone to hear a case except for capital punishment cases where two High Court judges will sit.

The Court of Appeal of the Supreme Court consists of three Judges, all of whom are currently retired British judges. The Court of Appeal sits twice a year for about a month each time.

Appeals to the Judicial Committee of the Privy Council in the United Kingdom in criminal cases are no longer available, whilst still retaining a very limited right of appeal to the J.C.P.C. in civil cases.

The other system of justice in Brunei is the shariah courts. It deals mainly in Muslim divorce and matters ancillary to a Muslim divorce in its civil jurisdiction and in the offences of khalwat (close proximity) and zina (adultery) amongst Muslims.

The shariah court structure is similar to the common law court structure except that it has no intermediate court and that the Court of Appeal is the final court of appeal.

All magistrates and judges in both the common law courts and the shariah courts are appointed by the Government. All local magistrates and judges were appointed from the civil service with none thus far being appointed from private practice.

== Territorial disputes ==
The sovereignty of the Territory of Limbang has been an ongoing issue between Brunei and Malaysia. It was reported in 2009 that a solution "was achieved between the two governments, when Brunei dropped all claims to Limbang, thus recognising it as a Malaysian territory". These reports, however, were dismissed by Brunei's former second minister of Foreign Affairs and Trade on 18 March 2009, who clarified that the claim on Limbang was never discussed [with Malaysia]. What was discussed between both countries was the demarcation of land boundaries on the whole.

Brunei is one of many nations that lay claim to the disputed Spratly Islands, several small islands situated between Brunei and Labuan, Malaysia which include Kuraman Island. They are contested between Brunei and Malaysia, but are internationally recognised as part of the latter.

== See also ==
- Culture of Brunei
- Politics of Brunei
