= Constitution of Brunei =

Law of Brunei

Constitution of Brunei Perlembagaan Negeri Brunei
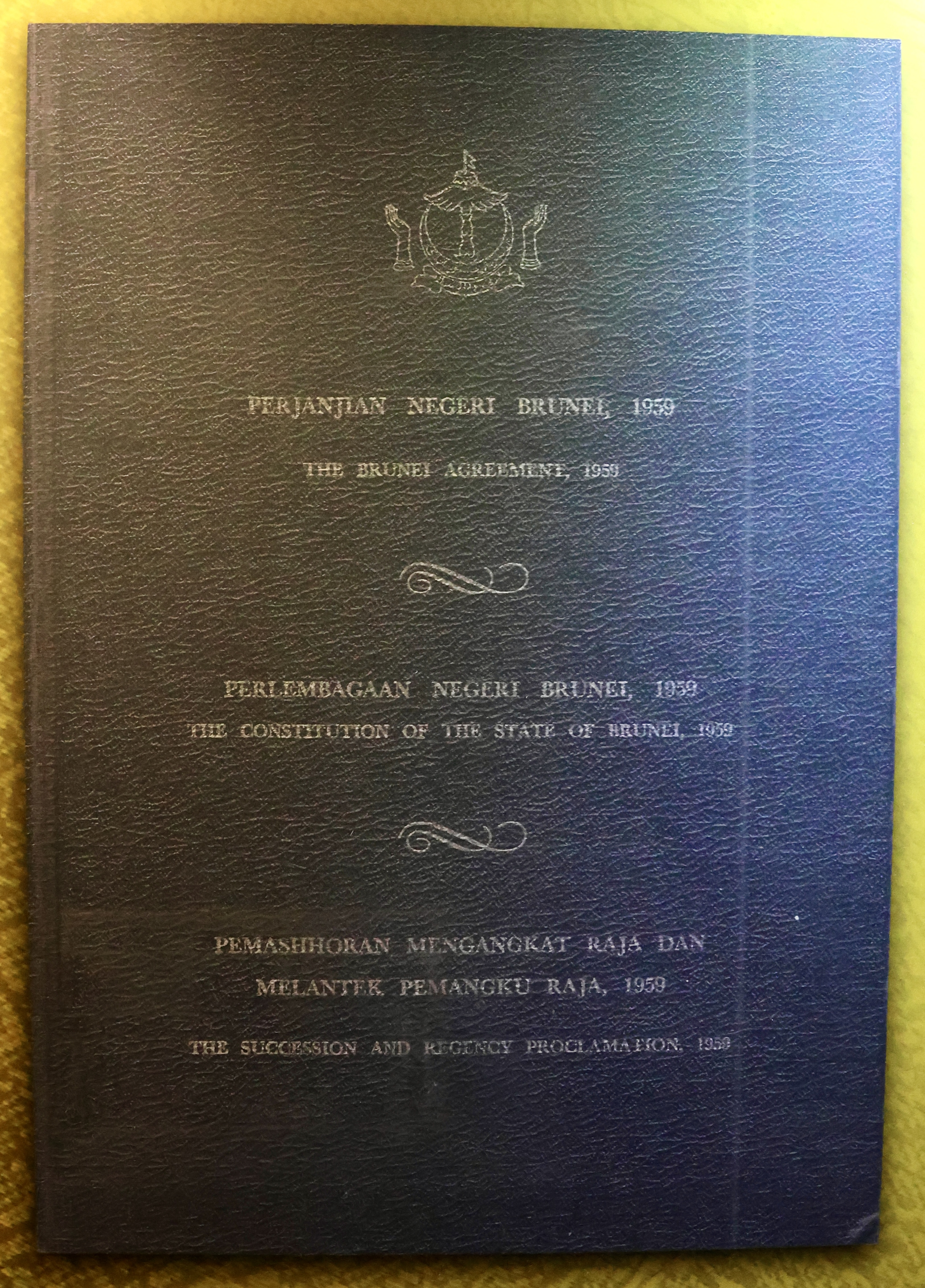
- Constitution of Brunei printed on the Brunei History Centre wall

Overview
- Jurisdiction: Brunei
- Ratified: 29 September 1959
- System: Melayu Islam Beraja

Government structure
- Branches: Three (executive, legislative and judiciary)
- Head of state: Sultan of Brunei
- Last amended: 1984
- Signatories: Sultan Omar Ali Saifuddien III and Sir Robert Heatlie Scott

Full text
- Constitution of Brunei at Wikisource

The Constitution of Brunei, officially Constitution of the State of Brunei (Malay: Perlembagaan Negeri Brunei; Jawi: ڤرلمباݢاءن نڬري بروني), was created in 1959. Ultimate authority rests with the Sultan, who is both head of state and head of government. In 2004 the Sultan approved a number of amendments to the constitution, including provision for a partially elected Legislative Council. As of 31 December 2018, elections had not been held.

Brunei's political system is governed by the constitution and the national tradition of the Malay Islamic Monarchy (Melayu Islam Beraja; MIB). The three components of MIB cover Malay culture, Islamic religion, and the political framework under the monarchy. It has a legal system based on English common law, although Islamic law (shariah) supersedes this in some cases. Brunei has a parliament but there are no elections; the last election was held in 1962.

Under Brunei's 1959 constitution, the Sultan is the head of state with full executive authority. Since the 1962 Brunei revolt, this authority has included emergency powers, which are renewed every two years, as well as the imposition of martial law. The current Sultan, Hassanal Bolkiah, also serves as the state's prime minister, finance minister and defence minister.

== History ==
It took almost six years to design the 1959 Constitution of Brunei before an agreement was reached with the British government. The creation of the Tujuh Serangkai ("seven branches"), a constitutional committee, and the signing of the agreement on 29 September 1959, followed a roughly three-year period of constitutional consultations in Brunei and London. These actions were the primary means of carrying out Sultan Omar Ali Saifuddien III's intentions.

== Structure ==
The 86 articles of the Constitution are organized into 12 chapters, a schedule, and a preamble.

=== Parts ===
- Part I – Preliminary
- Part II – Religion
- Part III – Executive Authority
- Part IV – Privy Council
- Part V – The Council of Ministers
- Part VI – The Legislative Council
- Part VII – Legislation and Procedure in the Legislative Council
- Part VIII – Finance
- Part IX – The Public Services
- Part X – The State Seal
- Part XI – Miscellaneous
- Part XII – Amendment and Interpretation of the Constitution
