= Politics of Brunei =

The politics of Brunei take place in a framework of an absolute monarchy, whereby the Sultan of Brunei is both head of state and head of government. Brunei is the only ruling state with an absolute monarchy in Southeast Asia. As of 2023, Brunei is one of seven absolute monarchies in the world.

== History ==
British rule over the Sultanate of Brunei was in place from 1888 until the Japanese occupied the region during World War II, and then it returned to British rule in 1945. With Britain in charge of military and international affairs, Brunei attained self-government in 1959 and complete independence in January 1984 as a result of the 1979 Treaty of Friendship and Cooperation. Since gaining its independence, Brunei has operated as a constitutional monarchy under the auspices of the Melayu Islam Beraja (MIB) state philosophy, which combines Islamic law, Malay culture, and monarchical rule.

== The Sultan ==
Prior to the independence of Brunei, the state is subject to by the 1959 Brunei Constitution as a British protected state. The Sultan holds absolute power in the state for administrative purposes. As the ruler of Islam, he does not wield all of the authority by himself. Since 1962, Brunei has had a state of emergency that is renewed every two years, during which time the Sultan retains absolute authority.

When Brunei regained full independence on 1 January 1984, the Sultan became prime minister, minister of finance, defence, foreign and home affairs, leading a six-member government. In October 1986, he appointed additional ministers for finance and home affairs, expanding the cabinet to eleven members. A 1988 cabinet change promoted the deputy minister to a full minister and established the Ministry of Industry and Primary Resources to promote national growth.

== Political conditions ==
About half of monarchic dictators suffer serious consequences such as death and imprisonment, Brunei is lauded as one of the most stable dictatorships. Due to their rarity, the outcomes of monarchic dictatorships are not well studied and through preference falsification, contentment with the Bruneian sultan and government may be overestimated, but up to this point, there are no known organized or small-scale efforts against the ruling government. Due to high oil revenue, Brunei has been able to provide extensive social services to its population, including free education and health care.

Welfare provision is a strong method for the Bruneian regime to exercise nonviolent political control, as citizens are reliant on the state both for employment and social services. Brunei's exhaustive provision of welfare raises the cost of protest and constitutes a means to maintain credible commitment. Brunei derives regime stability and legitimacy from a combination of welfare and religious authority through the national philosophy of Melayu Islam Beraja.

== Executive ==
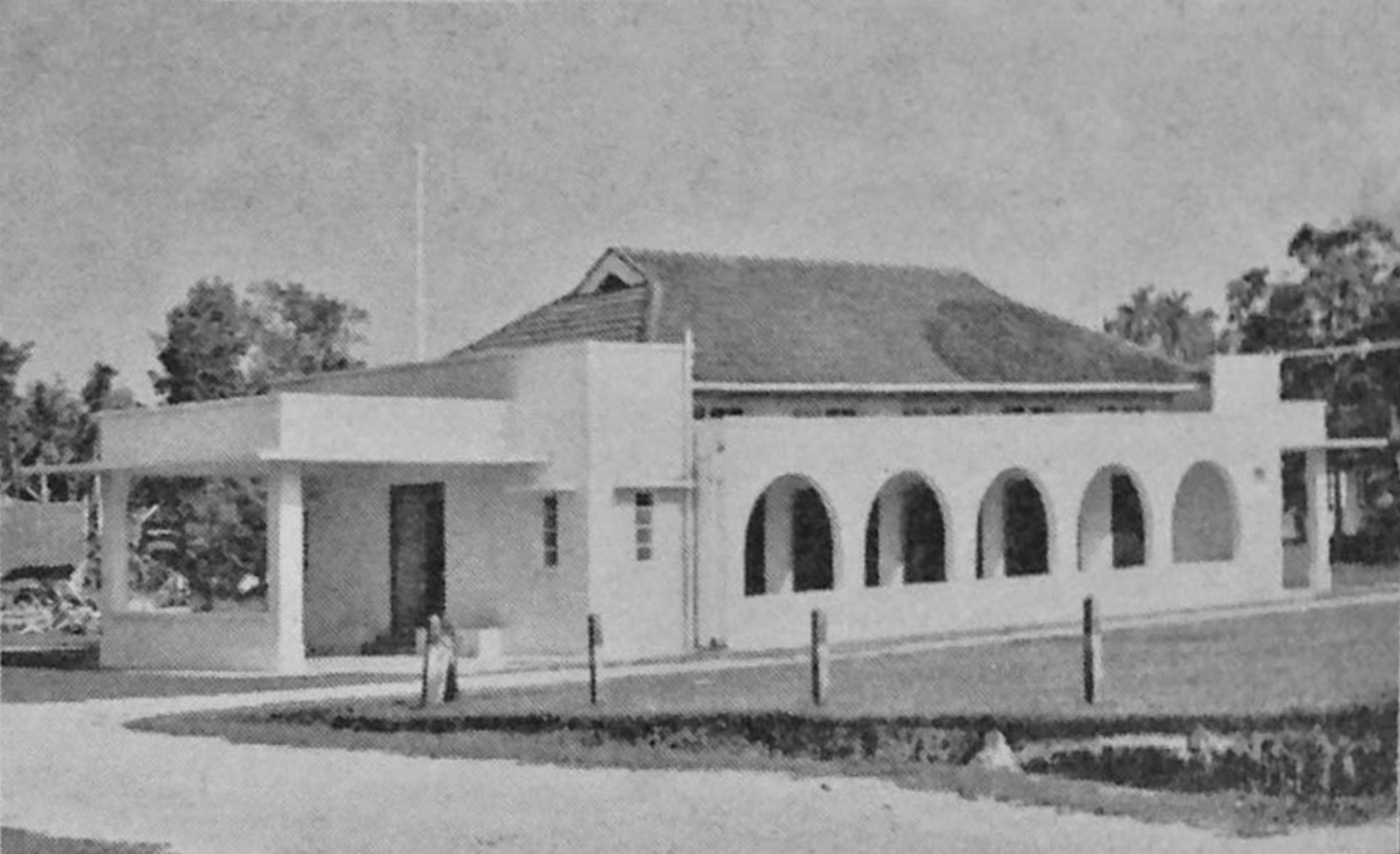
The 1959 promulgation of the Brunei Constitution took place at the Old Lapau

Prior to the independence of Brunei, the state is subject to by the 1959 Brunei Constitution as a British protected state. Sultan Omar Ali Saifuddien III established five councils—the Religious Council, the Privy Council, the Executive Council, the Legislative Council, and the Council of Succession—in accordance with the 1959 Brunei Constitution. The Sultan's judicial powers are within the jurisdiction of the Judiciary, an independent authority.

=== Executive Council ===
According to the constitution, all executive subjects and those scheduled for presentation at Legislative Council sessions are reviewed by the Executive Council. Eleven people make up this group: the High Commissioner, six ex-officio members, and four unofficial members who are also Legislative Council members by appointment. The Sultan serves as its head.

=== Privy Council ===
According to the constitution, the privy council advises the sultan in the matters concerning the exercise of authority of mercy and the amendment or revocation of provisions in the constitution. The council also advises the sultan on the conferring of Malay customary ranks, titles and honours. It also performs functions such as proclaiming a succession of regency. Members of the privy council include members of the royal family and senior government officials.

=== Council of Succession ===
The constitution states that, in the event that it becomes necessary, the council will decide who will succeed to the throne. In charge of it is Duli Pengiran Bendahara. The cheterias, four menteris, six members of the Religious Council, and every Malay member of the Executive Council make up its membership.

=== Religious Council ===
The Religious Council counsels the Sultan on all subjects pertaining to Islam in his function as the Head of the Islamic Faith. The State Religious Affairs Officer serves as chairman or president. Members of the council include government ministers, a pengiran cheteria, pehin manteris, state mufti, the attorney general, the sharia chief justice and additional members appointed by the Sultan.

=== Council of Cabinet Ministers ===
A council of ministers, or cabinet consists of nine members (including the sultan, as prime minister), perform the day-to-day administrative functions of government. In addition to developing and distributing working documents to the Cabinet Ministers' Council members, the primary duty is to advise the Sultan on matters of national administration, including policy approval.

== Legislative ==
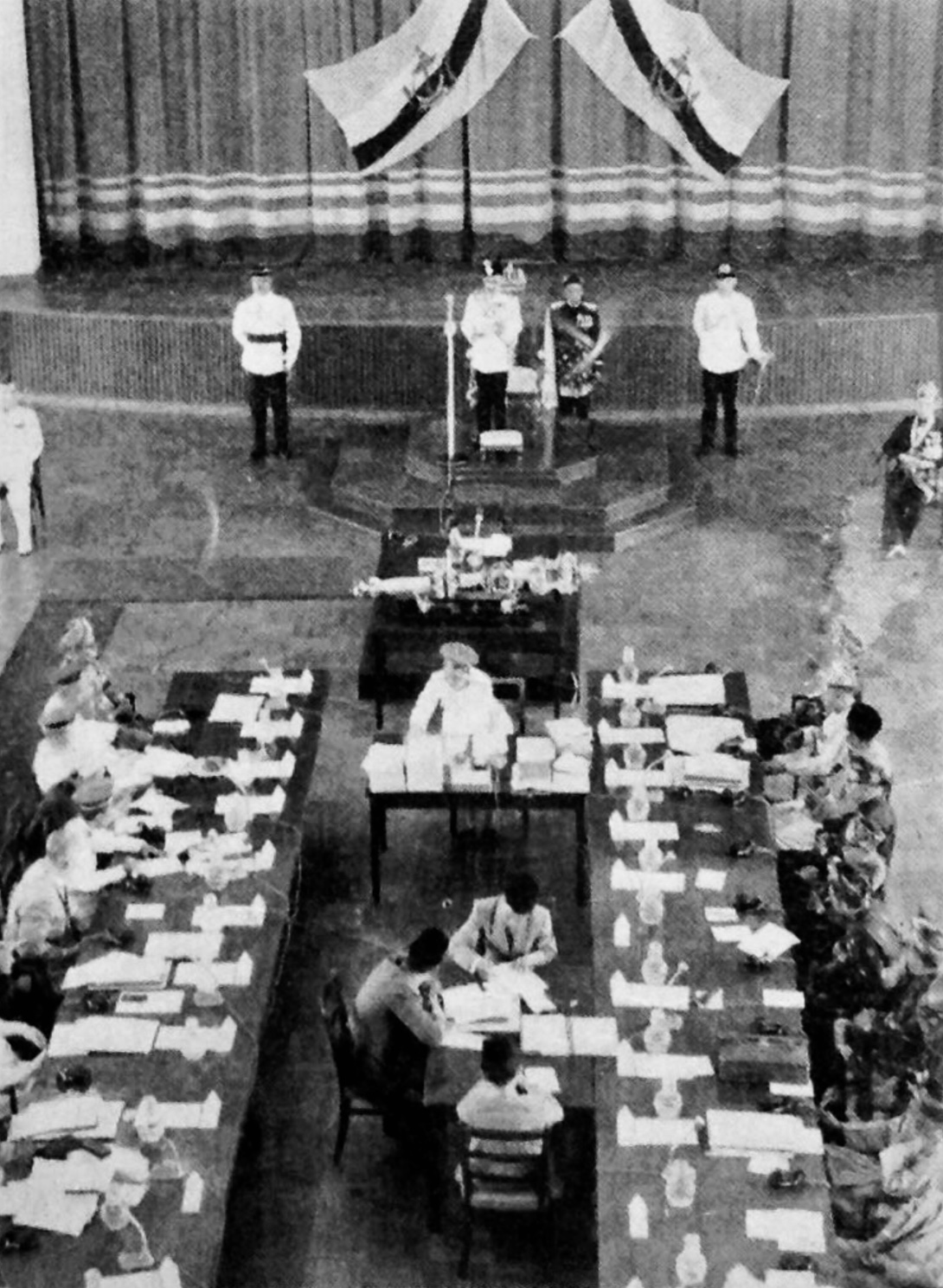
In 1961, Sultan Omar Ali Saifuddien III addressing the Legislative Council

The Legislative Council (Malay: Majlis Mesyuarat Negara) is empowered by the constitution to create laws, oversee budgets, and voice objections to actions taken by the executive branch. The speaker is in charge of it when it convenes in public. Ten official members, nineteen unofficial members, and six ex-officio members make up this council. The sultan appoints the council's members, and the unicameral body has no political authority. Since 1962, Brunei has not conducted direct parliamentary elections. Village-level councils are elected and have a consultative function; nevertheless, the government screens the candidates.

The appointed Legislative Council questions and answers with government representatives and formally approves the state budget, while having no independent authority. The council convenes once a year for a roughly two-week session. Nonetheless, the Bruneian government's activities generally lack transparency. In 2004, the sultan announced that for the next parliament, 15 of the 20 seats would be elected. However, no date for the election has been set.

Since 13 January 2017, the council has 33 members, including 13 cabinet ministers.

=== Political parties ===
The lack of national elections in Brunei limits legitimate political involvement and keeps opposition forces from rising to prominence, allowing the Sultan to retain his position of power. Social movements offer restricted channels for contesting unpopular policies; yet, racial and religious minorities have little chances to get involved in politics, even locally. Although there are no elections, the following legal party exists:

- National Development Party (Parti Pembangunan Bangsa; NDP) was allowed to register in 2005; it is the only party that has done so after promising to cooperate with the government and to swear allegiance to the monarch.

Former parties include:

- Youth Front (Barisan Pemuda; BARIP) was the first political party of Brunei, active from 1946–1948.
- Brunei People's Independence Party (Parti Barisan Kemerdekaan Rakyat; BAKER) was active from 1966–1985.
- Brunei National Solidarity Party (Parti Perpaduan Kebangsaan Brunei; PPKB) was active from 1986–2008.
- Brunei National Democratic Party (Parti Kebangsaan Demokratic Brunei; PKDB) was de-registered in 2008.
- Brunei People's Awareness Party (Parti Kesedaran Rakyat Brunei; PAKAR) was de-registered in 2007–2008.
- Brunei People's Party (Parti Rakyat Brunei; PRB) was active from 1956–1962.

== Judiciary ==
Brunei founded by the English Common Law, and must abide by the same equity doctrines and general application legislation as of 25 April 1951, according to the Application of Laws Act Chapter 2. Only to the extent permitted by regional conditions and customs are these laws implemented. English common law-based contract law and equity concepts are codified in the Contracts Act Chapter 106 and the Specific Relief Act Chapter 109. The magistrate's courts make up the subordinate court, while the high court and the court of appeals compose the supreme court. The court of appeal, the last court of appeal in criminal matters, hears appeals. Nonetheless, in civil disputes, the UK's Privy Council may hear appeals. The Sultan appoints judges to three-year tenure.

Alongside the supreme court, a Syariah court adjudicates cases pertaining to Islamic law. In many locations, Syariah Law takes precedence over civil law for Muslims. The intermediate court was founded in 1991 and has broad authority in both civil and criminal cases, albeit it does not handle capital cases. Brunei's Syariah courts now have more jurisdiction thanks to the introduction of the Syariah Penal Code Order 2013 in April 2014. These courts, which were formerly restricted to Muslim personal law cases, are now able to hear cases involving serious crimes like murder, rape, and theft that were previously handled by civil courts. As a result, the new Syariah Penal Code Order 2013 and the current Penal Code Chapter 22 both govern Brunei's criminal justice system.

== See also ==
- Government of Brunei
- List of sultans of Brunei
