= Salleh Masri =

Bruneian politician, writer and educator (1919–1996)

Yang Dimuliakan Pehin Orang Kaya Shahbandar Dato Seri Paduka Salleh Masri SPMB DPMB SLJ PJK
- صالح مسري
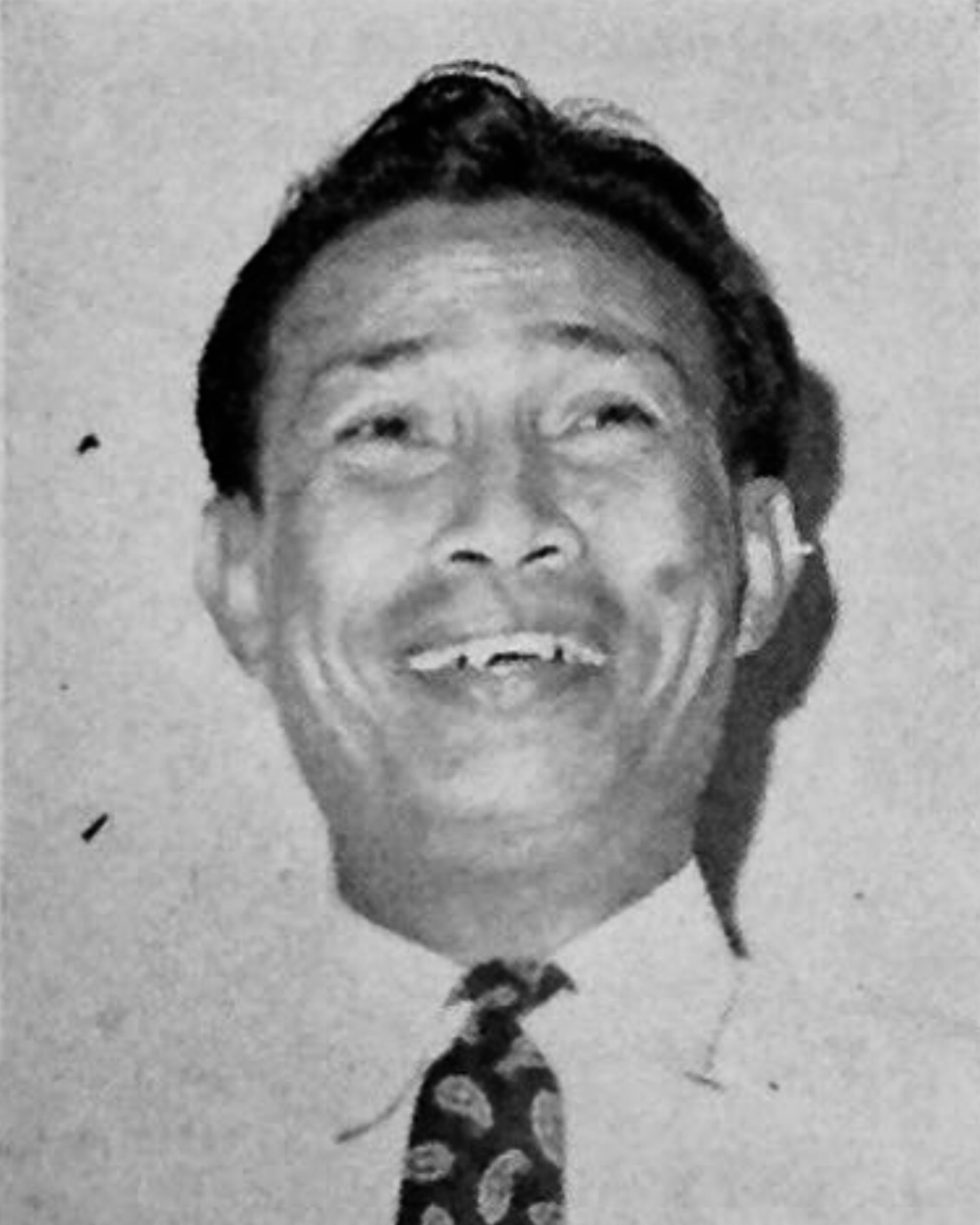
- Salleh in 1961

Member of Legislative Council
- In office 1981–1984
- In office 1970–1974
- In office 1962–1964
- Monarchs: Hassanal Bolkiah; Omar Ali Saifuddien III

President of Barisan Pemuda
- In office 1947–1948
- Preceded by: Abdullah Jahfar
- Succeeded by: Office dissolved

Personal details
- Born: 26 June 1919 Brunei
- Died: 14 December 1996 (aged 77) Brunei
- Other political affiliations: BARIP (1946–1948); PRB (1956–1958); PPKB (1986–1997)
- Children: Hayati and Rosli
- Education: Sultan Idris Training College
- Occupation: Politician; writer; teacher
- Known for: Founder of Barisan Pemuda and Parti Rakyat Brunei

Mohd Salleh bin Haji Masri (26 June 1919 – 14 December 1996), pen name H. M. Salleh, was a Bruneian aristocrat, nationalist politician, activist and an experience teacher who was among the founding members of the Brunei Youth Front (Malay: Barisan Pemuda Brunei) and Brunei People's Party (Parti Rakyat Brunei). Him alongside Yura Halim were considered to be the country's first novelists. He was the initial head of the Brunei Nationalist Movement in the 1940s and 1950s.

H. M. Salleh was the author of the book Tunangan Pemimpin Bangsa, which he authored while spending 100 days in government custody in Kuala Belait, describing his experiences during the battle. He regularly discussed the struggles endured by Bruneians who were subjected to prejudice in their own country and were deprived of their own heritage and sovereignty.

== Early life and career ==
Salleh was born on 26 June 1919. He completed his early schooling at the Brunei Town Malay School from 1925 to 1930. From 1934 to 1936, he worked as an assistant teacher. He attended the Sultan Idris Training College (SITC), Tanjung Malim, Malaysia, from 1937 to 1940. He began publishing articles on nationalistic subjects for Utusan Zaman, a Singaporean magazine, in 1937. Later, he started writing for Utusan Melayu, under the pseudonym Putera Jati. The First Scout troop in the Belait District was opened in 1939 and was led by him.

Sultan Ahmad Tajuddin received his early education in the palace prior attending formal school, Salleh was one of the teachers assigned to teach him. He was then employed as a teacher at the Kuala Belait Malay School and the Brunei Town Malay School between 1940 and 1941 before being named headmaster. He co-founded the Barisan Pemuda (BARIP) in 1939 with Pengiran Yusof and Jamil Al-Sufri. He also served as the head of the Belait Youth Association.

== Political career ==
Salleh openly embraced the occupiers and worked in the Japanese Propaganda Unit during the Japanese occupation of Brunei. In response to the British Military Administration, he was sentenced to eighteen months in prison for his collaboration with the Japanese as their propaganda secretary; he was released after three months of incarceration. The Japanese national anthem served as the inspiration for his theatrical production Kami Gayu, which was written during the Prohibition period.

Salleh was also one of the leaders of the Malay-Chinese clash in March 1946 and was imprisoned for three months for his involvement. The arrest of H.M. Salleh seems to have infuriated Bruneian locals. At the time, he had never concealed his disapproval of Chinese interests. The local intellectuals had looked up to him for his vocal criticism of the foreign government before A. M. Azahari became well known as the head of the Parti Rakyat Brunei (BRP). After being held for six months, he was greeted with heroism upon his release. Additionally, he was chosen unanimously to lead BARIP going forward, replacing outgoing President Abdullah bin Jahfar, who resigned after just five months in office.

Salleh served as the BARIP's president from 1947 to 1948 during the time it was reconstituted. In front of an estimated 2,000 spectators during the inaugural annual celebration of BARIP's founding on 12 April 1947, President H.M. Salleh promised the Association's unwavering allegiance to the Bruneian monarch. In 1947, Salleh Masri, who was president at the time, issued a message to Malcolm MacDonald, the governor general of Singapore, pleading for the country to get closer to independence with some kind of representative governance. He published a piece named Tangisan Terjajah. The British prohibited the piece because it was primarily anti-colonialist in nature.

Salleh went back to the classroom and, between 1954 and 1955, was appointed supervisor of the School Feeding Program. On 21 January 1956, A. M. Azahari and H.M. Salleh launched PRB as a division of Partai Rakyat Malaya. The PRB's first meeting was held in his home at Kampong Kianggeh. Furthermore, he served as the PRB's vice president from 1956 to 1958 and was one of the organization's founding members in August 1956. Salleh Masri, Azahari, and a number of other PRB leaders were punished in 1958 for failing to provide the Registrar of Societies with the PRB's yearly financial records. Midway through 1958, he was sentenced to a few months in prison once more after being accused of drinking too much at a social event at the capital's Brunei Hotel. Salleh submitted his resignation from the PRB after being released from prison in September 1958. After the revolt in 1962, he further distanced himself from the PRB and is reported to have collaborated closely with the government. As a result of Azahari's actions, Salleh was already under tension and no longer on the same page with his plans for achieving Brunei's independence.

According to a 1991 interview with Azahari, the decision to revolt was made in A. M. Azahari's absence. When it was suggested that Salleh might have been an informant, Azahari responded that it was strange that Salleh was not detained during the Brunei Film Company (BRUFICO) on 28 October 1952, that he would later only briefly imprisoned during the Brunei rebellion, and that Salleh was now a "big-shot" in Brunei. Azahari made no additional remarks.

After 1962, he had a number of high-ranking positions in the government, including chief information officer from 1974 to 1980 and commissioner of social welfare from 1961 to 1974. In addition, he served as a member of the Legislative Council from 1962 to 1964, 1970 to 1974, and 1981 to 1984. From 1981 to 1983, he also served as a member of the Majlis Menteri-Menteri, the Council of Ministers. In 1986, when the Parti Perpaduan Kebangsaan Brunei (PPKB) was established, Salleh Masri allegedly returned to politics. When Haji Abdul Latif Bin Chuchu resigned from his position as the BNSP's president in April 1996, Salleh Masri—at the time the vice president—was chosen to fill the vacancy.

According to the Brunel Government's chief information officer, Salleh, in March 1976, PRB leaders who were in exile and desired to return to their native country should request a meeting with the sultan and ask for a pardon. He invited attendees of an anti-PRB gathering in Bangar, Temburong to return if they could obtain a pardon. He was responding to an information from Kuching that stated PRB leaders would be released and allowed to return if the sultan agreed to hold elections. In keeping with this theme, Salleh and other speakers asserted that Brunei was not a colony and that any PRB leaders outside of Brunei who claimed otherwise were lying. He yelled "Merdeka! Merdeka! Merdeka!" at one state. The audience erupted in fervor.

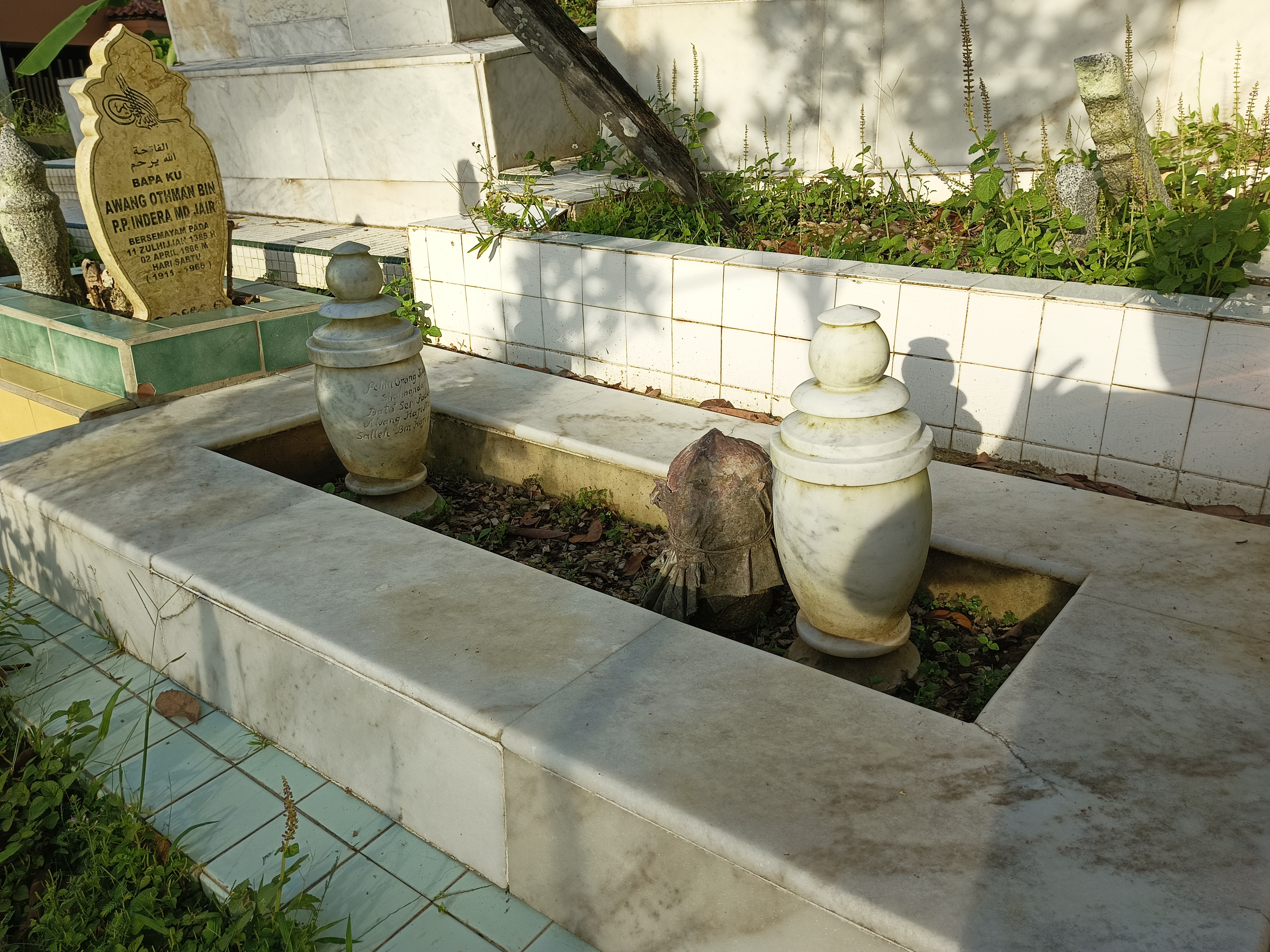
Salleh Masri's grave at Kianggeh Dagang Muslim Cemetery

Salleh died on 14 December 1996, a little over a year after taking up the position. He was buried at Kianggeh Muslim Cemetery, Bandar Seri Begawan.

== Personal life ==
Mohd Salleh notably has a daughter named, Hayati is the first female Attorney General of Brunei. In addition to another son of his, Rosli was the Acting Commissioner of Police.

== Bibliography ==
- Salleh, H. M. (1950). Tunangan pemimpin bangsa (in Malay). Malay Press.
- Salleh, H. M. (1988). Esok bukan sebuah rindu (in Malay). Mastika Publisher.
- Salleh, H. M. (1988). Harga sebuah tragedi (in Malay). Mastika Publisher.
- Salleh, Zainab H. M. (2006). Poligami dalam Islam (in Malay). Bekas pelawat mubalighah Majlis Agama Islam.

== Titles and honours ==
=== Titles ===
Upon taking up as one of the Manteri-Manteri of Brunei, he was bestowed the title of Yang Dimuliakan Pehin Orang Kaya Shahbandar on 29 August 1992. Prior to this on 8 August 1968, he had the title of Pehin Orang Kaya Laila Wangsa.

=== Honours ===
Salleh has earned the following honours;

- Order of Seri Paduka Mahkota Brunei First Class (SPMB) – Dato Seri Paduka
- Order of Seri Paduka Mahkota Brunei Second Class (DPMB; 1 January 1971) – Dato Paduka
- Order of Paduka Seri Laila Jasa Third Class (SLJ)
- Meritorious Service Medal (PJK; 2 June 1976)
