= National Development Party (Brunei) =

Brunei's political party

- Malay name: Parti Pembangunan Bangsa ڤرتي ڤمباڠونن بڠسا
- Chinese name: 文莱国家发展党 Wénlái guójiā fāzhǎn dǎng
- Tamil name: புரூனி தேசிய மேம்பாட்டுக் கட்சி Purūṉi tēciya mēmpāṭṭuk kaṭci
- President: Zainal bin Talib (acting)
- Secretary-General: Ahmad bin Hj Timpus
- Deputy President: Mahmud Morshidi Othman
- Founder: Yassin Affandi
- Legalised: 31 August 2005
- Headquarters: Simpang 323 Jerudong, Sengkurong, Brunei-Muara
- Newspaper: Aspirasi (Aspiration)
- Official Radio: Rumpun Suara
- Ideology: Ultra-royalism; Melayu Islam Beraja; Islamism; Ketuanan Melayu; Anti-democratic
- Religion: Sunni Islam
- International affiliation: International Monarchist Conference

Website
- Official Facebook page

National Development Party (Malay: Parti Pembangunan Bangsa, ڤرتي ڤمباڠونن بڠسا; abbrev: NDP) is a political party in Brunei. It was founded by Yassin Affandi following the 2004 constitutional amendments and registered on 31 August 2005 and held its inaugural congress in April 2006. After the deregistration of the People's Awareness Party (PAKAR) and the Brunei National Solidarity Party between 2007 and 2008, the NDP became the only legal party in the country. Following Affandi's resignation in February 2011, Mahmud Morshidi Othman succeeded him as party president. In 2023, it was led by Zainal Talib.

== History ==
Brunei revolt happened on 8 December 1962 and was led by A. M. Azahari, the leader of Brunei People's Party. The revolt led to the party being banned and halted political party activity in Brunei, as the country remained under a state of emergency from 1962 onward.. In 2004, Hassanal Bolkiah amended the constitution to allow citizens to elect one-third of the parliament, whereas all members had previously been appointed by him.

The party was registered in 31 August 2005. Following the constitutional amendments, Yassin Affandi applied to register the National Development Party, which became a legal political party alongside Brunei National Solidarity Party and the Brunei People'sAwareness Party. In April 2006, the party held its inaugural congress and issued its manifesto, and launched a website for their party.

== Political activity ==
In 2007, the Registrar of Societies disbanded the People's Awareness Party (PAKAR) and forced the president of the Brunei National Solidarity Party to step down, before deregistering the party in 2008, which left the National Development Party as the only party in the country at that time.

The party held their third congress in June 2008 where the party proposed Brunei replace Malaysia as coordinator of the International Monitoring Team. Then, Affandi resigned in February 2011 and replaced by Mahmud Morshidi Othman as the president and Zainal Talib as deputy president.In 2023, it was led by Zainal Talib as president.

== Structure ==
The following members of the National Development Party as of 31 March 2020:

Position	Individual
President	Zainal Talib (acting)
Deputy President	Zainal Talib
Secretary-General	Ahmad Timpus
Assistant Secretary-General	Junaidah Hassan
Member	Mahmud Basuani Othman
Member	Hamzah Salleh
Member	Abdul Rajak Abdul Latip
Member	Mahadi Suhaili
Member	Rasiah Alah
Member	Puspa Linda Abidin
Member	Badang Perayam
Member	Mohd Sopian Taha
Member	Effa Ghafur
Member	Ali Ahad
Member	Abdul Aziz A.A. Haneefa.
Member	Armah Ahmad
Member	Mohd Abihu Rairah Ghazali
