= Yassin Affandi =

Bruneian politician

- يسسين اففندي
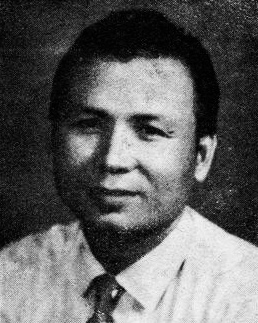
- Yassin in 1962

President of the National Development Party
- In office 2005–2010

Secretary-General of Brunei People's Party
- In office 1978–1974
- In office 1956–1962
- President: A.M. Azahari

Personal details
- Born: 19 May 1922 Sungai Matan, Brunei-Muara, Brunei
- Died: 18 July 2012 (aged 90) Bandar Seri Begawan, Brunei
- Other political affiliations: BARIP (1946–1948); PRB (1956–1962; 1974–1984); NDP (2005–2010)
- Education: St. George's School
- Occupation: Politician

Muhammad Yasin bin Abdul Rahman (19 May 1922 – 18 July 2012), also known as Yassin Affandi, was a Bruneian politician who served as the president of the National Development Party from 2005 to 2010. He worked with A.M. Azahari during the Brunei revolt of 1962, when they called for the unification of Brunei, Sarawak, and North Borneo (Sabah) under a single administration. Together with other rebels, they directed against Brunei's proposed inclusion in the Federation of Malaysia.

== Early life and education ==
On 19 May 1922, Yassin was born in Kampong Sungai Matan, which is located outside of Bandar Seri Begawan. When he was twelve years old, from 1934 to 1937, he attended the Brunei Town Malay School for his early schooling. With permission from Sarawak Junior Level, he pursued his education at St. George's School from 1937 until 1942 after finishing Grade 4. The school closed in 1942 due to the Japanese invasion of Brunei. During the occupation, the Japanese taught a number of Bruneian students, including Marsal Maun, Yassin, A. M. Azahari, Pengiran Muhammad Yusuf, and Jamil Al-Sufri.

The Japanese government in Brunei then dispatched Yassin to Miri, Sarawak, to study Japanese. While studying, Yassin was employed as an electrician and clerk while he was in Miri. After completing his studies, he moved to Labuan. He was employed by the British Military Administration in Labuan as a clerk and translator after the war. He was offered the chance to work part-time as a ground crew in the air defence in Labuan.

Yassin was involved in the March 1946 Malay-Chinese clash at Labuan. He worked in the Supply Depot and the National Registration Department after returning to Brunei in July. He began work at British Malayan Petroleum Company (BMPC) in Seria at the end of 1947 as a storekeeper and advanced to senior local staff by the middle of 1948. From 1947 till 1956, he worked for Shell Oil and organised the company's trade union while he was employed at Shell.

== Political career ==
=== Barisan Pemuda ===
Yassin was also involved at an early age in the Barisan Pemuda (BARIP) movement, which Sultan Ahmad Tajuddin supported. From 1946 to 1948, he served as BARIP's Head of Information. He was elected to the position of General-Secretary of BARIP Belait and Seria Branch. He was enthralled by the Sultan's battle, decided to launch an underground campaign against British colonialism with his companions after the British disabled BARIP in 1948. This movement would continue until the Brunei People's Party (PRB) was formally founded in 1956.

=== Brunei People's Party ===
Yassin was named as PRB's first general secretary. At the time, the states of Sarawak and Sabah were included in the fight for Brunei's independence, and PRB was the only political party in Borneo. Yassin traveled to London in 1957, accompanied by the late Azahari and Zaini Ahmad, on behalf of PRB, to confer with the Colonial Office on the Brunei Constitution's draft. Regarding the draft Constitution that the Bruneian delegation was negotiating at the time, the PRB delegation has provided its second opinion. Assigned the task of coordinating the North Kalimantan National Army (TNKU) in August 1961 and participated in many closed-door talks in Jakarta with Indonesian legislators.

In a 1998 interview with Zaini Ahmad, he stated that Affandy's sister was married to Azahari's father, therefore are somewhat related via blood. He added that Yassin was a really docile kind of man and he has never heard him raise any objections to Azahari.

=== Revolt and exile ===
He was elected in August 1962 to the position of District Councillor. He was the "Overall Commander" of TNKU, who on 8 December 1962, read Kalimantan Utara's proclamation of independence, marking the start of the Brunei revolt. The armed uprising was against the British occupation of Brunei and the surrounding area. Soon after, British Army soldiers airlifted from Singapore put an end to the uprising. However, up until his capture on 18 May 1963, there was still a second phase of insurgency. He was wounded in action after a fight with Royal Gurkha Rifles near the river mouth of Brunei River, in the marshes surrounding Brunei Bay.

On 12 July 1973, the day of Sultan Sir Omar All Saifuddin's birthday, Yassin and six other senior PRB detainees of the Berakas Detention Camp, including Zaini, escaped by sea to nearby Limbang in Sarawak, thanks to an operation led by the nephew and brother of PRB leader Azahari, Sheikh Saleh Sheikh Mahmud. The "springing" was reportedly given covert support by Ghazali Shafie, who served as the Minister of Foreign Affairs for the Malaysian government at the time. According to a report published by Utusan Malaysia on the 27, ten Bruneians (including Yassin) who had fled to Malaysia were given political refuge by the Malaysian government, as soon as they arrived.

In 1974–1984, when PRB made a return overseas, he was once more entrusted with responsibilities and trusts as the organisation's secretary general. He was once again trusted to represent the PRB independence mission to the United Nations (UN) in July and November 1975, together with Azahari and Zaini Ahmad, to present a petition to assert Brunei's independence. UN Resolution 3424 (1975) was the resolution that the UN adopted in response to the PRB's independence claim. A bounty of B$15,000 was put on him by the Brunei government at the time.

=== Return to Brunei ===
During his exile Yassin lived in Kuala Lumpur. In 1997, he was eventually granted permission to return home after 25 years of exile. In 1998, he returned to Brunei, but was kept in Bruneian detention for two years before being set free in August 1999. He went on to co-found the National Development Party (NDP) in 2005, and was chosen as the party's president at its inaugural general congress in June 2006. After that, he served as president for four years before being forced to resign in August 2010 due to health issues.

During the party's third convention in June 2008, he suggested that Brunei take over from Malaysia as the coordinator of the International Monitoring Team, which has been in charge of overseeing a provisional truce between the Government of the Philippines and the Moro Islamic Liberation Front (MILF). The MILF replied that it was better if Malaysia kept playing that role. Later on, he was named chairman of the Party Advisory Board, a position he held until his death.

== Death ==
On 18 July 2012, Yassin died at the age of 90.
