= Brunei People's Party =

Banned political party in Brunei

Brunei People's Party Parti Rakyat Brunei ڤرتي رعيت بروني
- Abbreviation: BRP, PRB
- Leader: A. M. Azahari
- Founder: A. M. Azahari; Salleh Masri
- Founded: 21 January 1956
- Registered: 15 August 1956
- Banned: 9 December 1962
- Preceded by: Angkatan Pemuda Brunei; Barisan Pemuda
- Succeeded by: Brunei United Party; Brunei National Party
- Headquarters: Brunei Town, Brunei
- Military: North Kalimantan National Army
- Membership (1957): 16,000
- Ideology: Left-wing nationalism Malay nationalism Anti-colonial nationalism
- Political position: Left-wing
- Religion: Sunni Islam
- Regional affiliation: Malayan People's Party

Party flag

The Brunei People's Party (BPR), also known as the Parti Rakyat Brunei (PRB), was a political party in Brunei that was later banned. It won the district council elections in 1962, but disputes with the Sultan and the British authorities led to the failed Brunei revolt. The party continued in exile for several decades but is now believed to be defunct.

The PRB was established as a left-wing party in 1956 and aimed to bring Brunei into full independence from the United Kingdom. The party called for a constitution that would unite Brunei, North Borneo, and Sarawak under a fully democratic government, the Unitary State of North Kalimantan or Negara Kesatuan Kalimantan Utara (NKKU). However, in 1958, the British publicised their own ideas and rejected the Borneo union ambitions of the PRB, seeking instead for a gradual democratic transformation. The PRB's reactions to both the plan for a Federation of Malaysia and the Constitution of Brunei led to a mutiny in the first part of December 1962.

The PRB sought to establish a fully democratic government for Brunei while preserving the country's monarchy; it frequently displayed a lack of agreement with the government, particularly when it came to the creation of a new constitution. Party leader A. M. Azahari had suggested that 75% of the Legislative Council of Brunei (LegCo) members should be elected independently rather than chosen by the Sultan in order to demand that the people of Brunei have complete democracy in their governance.

== History ==
=== Formation and early success ===
Muhammad bin Haji Manggol spearheaded an underground campaign in Temburong District in October 1953, but the government put an end to it, and Muhammad and his allies were arrested for trying to topple British control. The protest that followed and the denial of Brunei Film Production Company's (BRUFICO) registration served as a stark reminder of this discontent and signaled the start of Brunei's nationalist movement. As a result of these developments, Azahari was able to establish the PRB, which was inspired by the Indonesian National Revolution and aimed to steer Brunei toward independence.

Founders of PRB

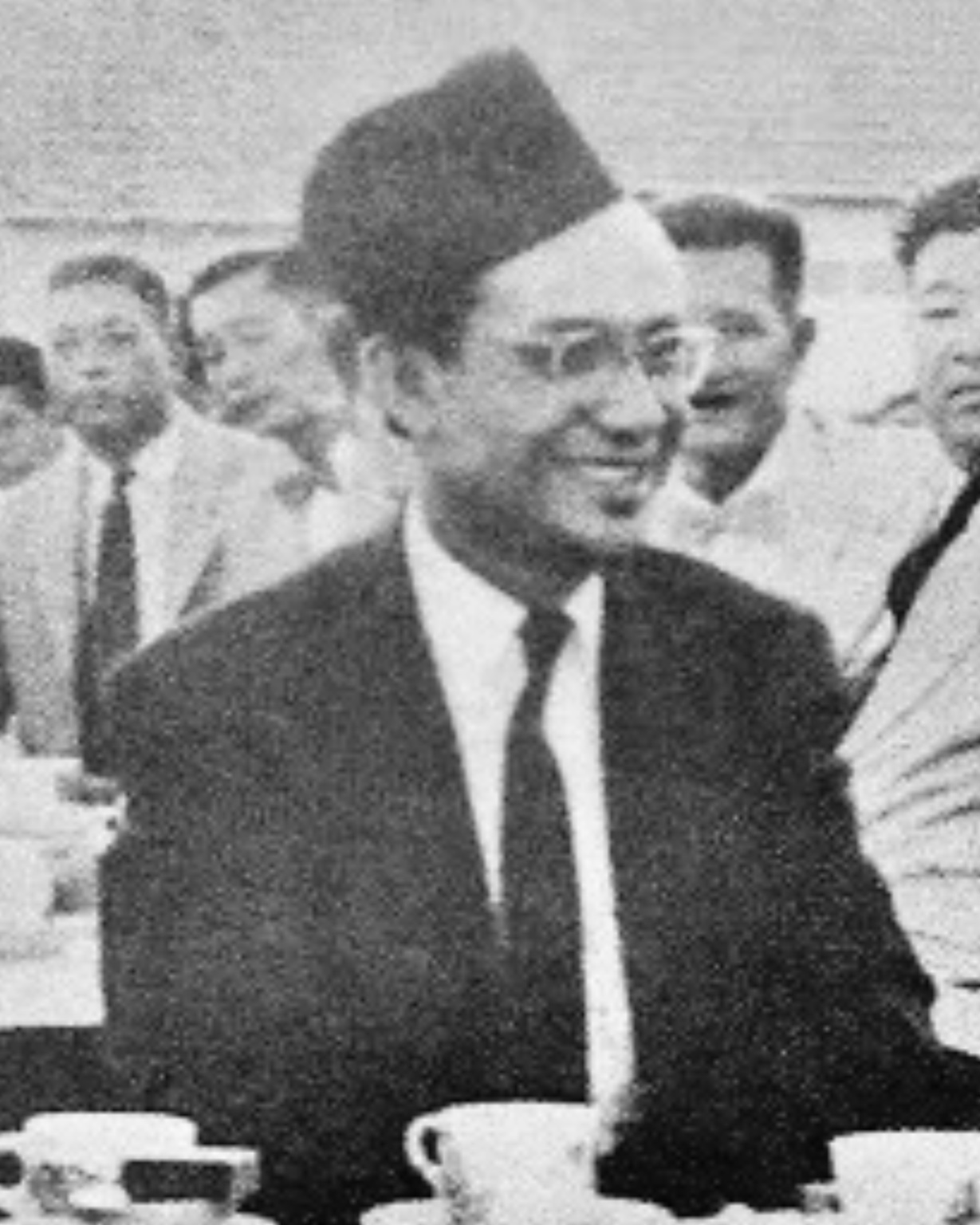
A. M. Azahari

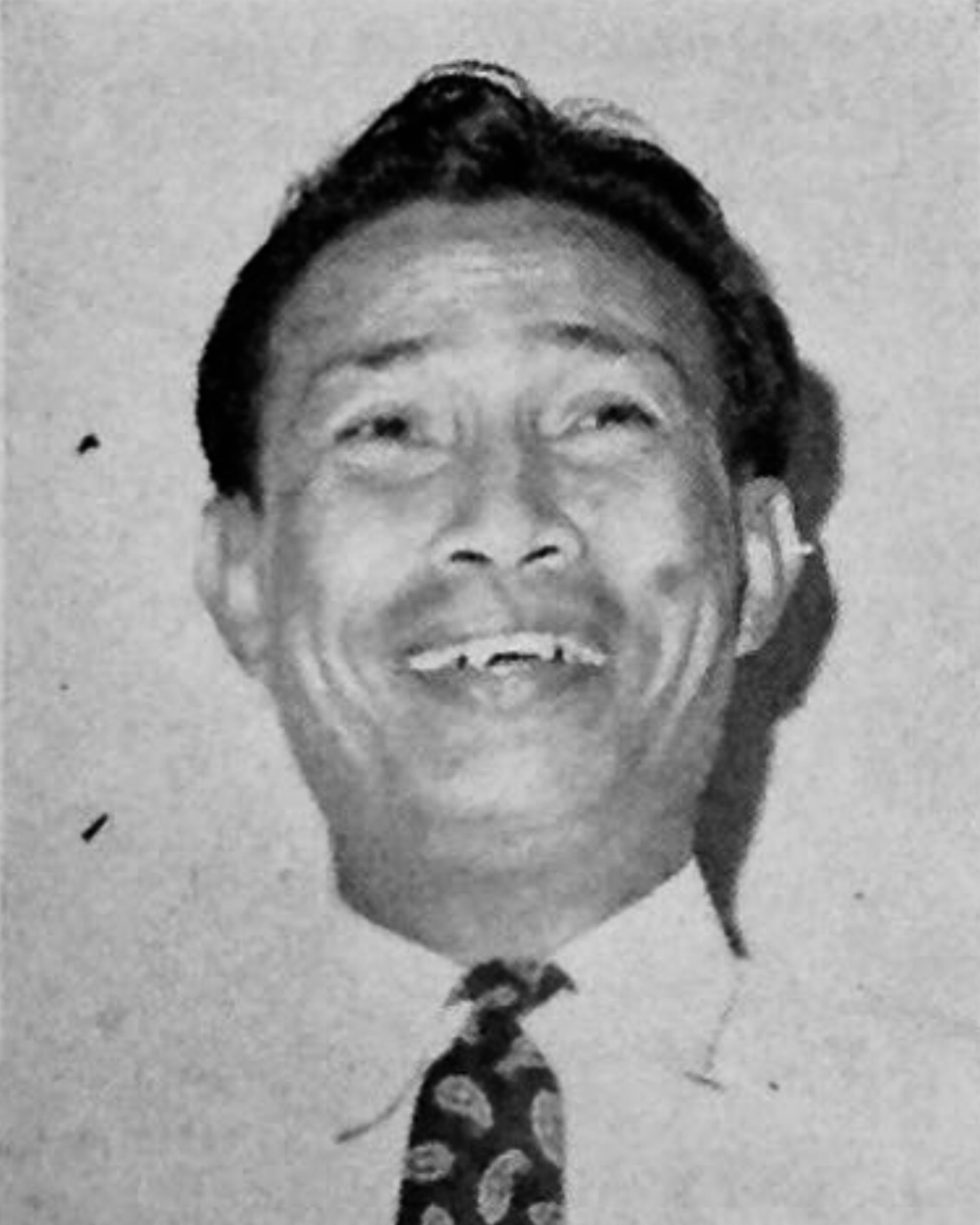
Salleh Masri

With the help of Salleh Masri, A. M. Azahari established the Parti Rakyat Brunei (PRB), the country's first officially recognised political party, on 21 or 22 January 1956, as an offshoot of the Malayan People's Party. On 15 August, the party finally registered and received legal status, provided that it limited its operations to Brunei. In addition to fighting for independence for the entire archipelago and preserving Sultan Omar Ali Saifuddien III's position by establishing the North Borneo Federation, the anti-colonialism ideology of the party intended included political, economic, and social ones. PRB aimed to create a sovereign, democratic Malay nation free from British influence that ensures the security and well-being of its citizens under a monarchy. The majority of its members were non-aristocratic Malay people who were against both monarchy and colonial authority.

As the PRB was an offshoot of the Ahmad Boestamam-led Malayan People's Party, the government of Brunei initially refused to approve its registration. The PRB broke up relations with the Malayan People's Party and updated its policy rules to better suit Brunei's requirements in order to comply with Bruneian legal standards. With the public's backing thanks to Azahari's convincing speeches and arguments, the PRB was able to enlist 16,000 members in 1957, representing a variety of races in Brunei, North Borneo, and Sarawak. Encouraged by this backing, Azahari vehemently denounced the Sultan's incremental changes, calling for complete democracy and denouncing the 1959 Constitution of Brunei as inadequate for establishing a democratic society.

The rise of the PRB presented a threat to the Sultan's plans. Despite receiving license for registration, the PRB was prohibited from operating and conducting campaigns without government oversight. The PRB attracted a varied membership by promising a better political and socioeconomic system, even after the government ‘warned’ the people about the party's impact. Azahari's nationalist plan included all of British Borneo.

=== Disagreements with the government ===
The PRB asked Burhanuddin al-Helmy and Boestamam to speak at its first congress on 30 March 1957, and its second congress on 30 March 1958, to motivate the people's fight for Brunei's independence. Nonetheless, Azahari criticised the government for attempting to bar these prominent Malayan politicians from attending, charging that they were planning to keep Brunei under British colonial rule. The PRB was a strong force in Brunei's political landscape, but the government was unwavering in its refusal to compromise.

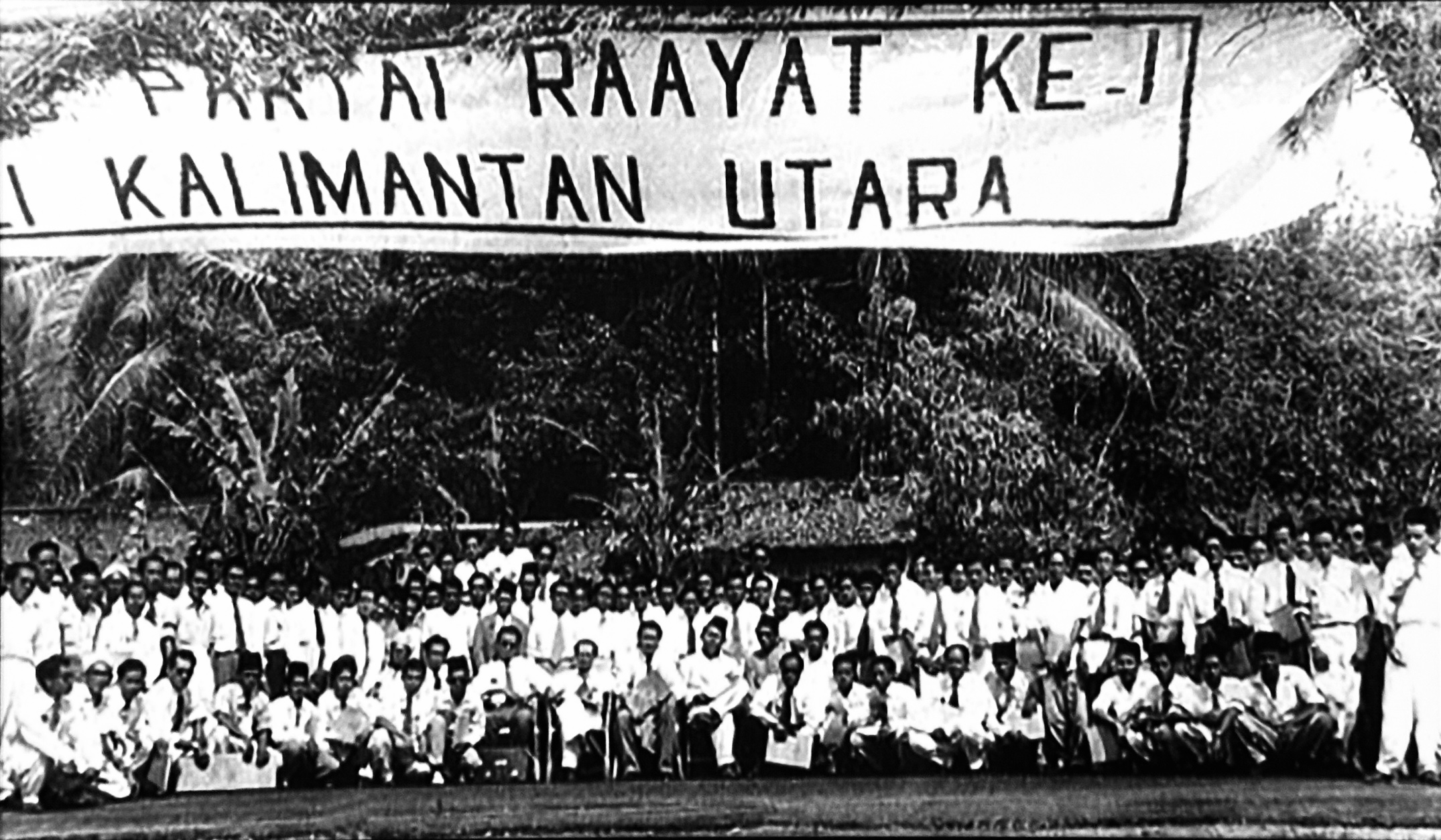
Senior officials and PRB members take a group portrait during the inaugural congress in Kilanas in 1957

The PRB quickly sent a delegation of its own to intercept the government group that was scheduled to go to London to draft a new Written Constitution for Brunei. Seeking approval for its political demands and recommendations, the PRB team met with the Secretary of State for the Colonies in London on 5 September 1957. The British demanded that all requests follow established protocols, forcing the PRB to first meet with the Sultan, Brunei's legal authority, thus the delegation returned empty-handed. This setback undermined public confidence in the Party.

The party's defeat has been impacted by this meaningless agreement not just in terms of political morality but also financially because it paid for the delegation's trip to London. It is said that Azahari resigned as party leader when the PRB delegation in London failed, citing his refusal to present the PRB's financial information that was utilised. But he eventually withdrew this resignation, citing the continued necessity for his leadership. Zaini Ahmad brought himself to pursue his education in the UK while working as his secretary. On 29 September 1959, the new Written Constitution of the State of Brunei was signed and proclaimed following many rounds of negotiations between the Bruneian government and the British government in London and Brunei from 1957 to 1959. The Bruneian government was represented by the Sultan, while the British government was represented by Robert Heatlie Scott. By abolishing the 1906 Agreement and creating the position of British High Commissioner in place of British Resident, this constitution limited British authority to defence and foreign relations.

After the 1959 constitution was enacted, Brunei's politics seemed stable, but the idea brought in fresh waves of disruption in the early 1960s. Tunku Abdul Rahman, invited Brunei, Sabah, Sarawak, and Singapore to join the planned Federation of Malaysia on 27 May 1961. Based on common lineage, culture, and sociopolitical structures, he proposed this union, reasoning that it would provide political, economic, and security advantages while reducing Communist influence in the area. Furthermore, he asserted that the states that joined Malaysia would become fully independent of British sovereignty faster.

As several PRB leaders quit to create other parties due to a lack of faith in their ability to govern, Brunei's political landscape grew increasingly complicated. As a result, the Brunei United Party (BUP) was founded in December 1961, and the Brunei National Party (BNO) in August 1960. On 30 August 1962, Brunei conducted its first district council election amid negotiations over the formation of Malaysia. With the exception of Labu in the Temburong District, which was won by an independent candidate, the PRB secured 54 of the 55 seats in the District Assembly, demonstrating strong backing for Brunei's decision to refuse membership in Malaysia. The lone non-PRB councillor joined the PRB a week after the election, and 16 of the 55 District Councillors went on to become LegCo members, numbering 33. The PRB leaders were reaffirmed in their goal of creating a North Borneo nation-state as a substitute for Greater Malaysia, which was in fact supported by the people, after BNO and BUP suffered a resounding defeat.

=== Brunei revolt ===
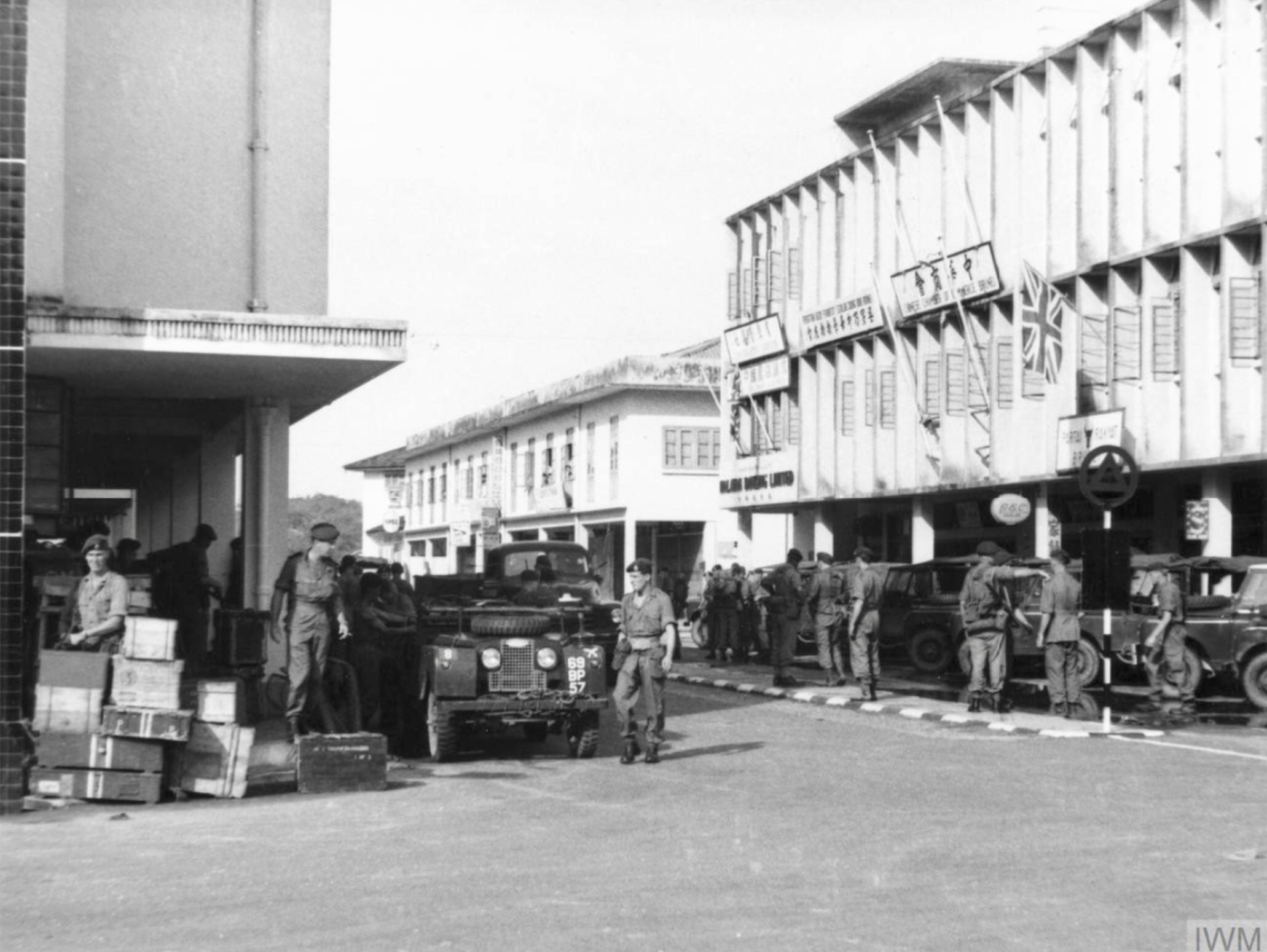
British soldiers from the Queen's Own Highlanders at Brunei Town in December 1962

The North Kalimantan National Army (TNKU), an armed wing of the PRB that won the election, was founded earlier. In order to create the NKKU and establish Brunei's independence, the TNKU began the Brunei revolt on 8 December 1962. Their primary objective was to seize control of the Police Headquarters, Istana Darul Hana, and the Menteri Besar's house in Brunei Town. They planned to persuade the Sultan, if they were successful in detaining him, to proclaim the creation of an independent NKKU and designate him as the head of state, or Seri Mahkota. The three most important posts in the new nation-state's government—Prime Minister, Minister of Defence, and Minister of Foreign Affairs—would fall to Azahari. Azahari appointed him Minister of Economics, Commerce, and Industry of the projected NKKU. He was in Manila in support of the Malaysia Agreement during the Azahari visit to the UN Headquarters in New York City when the Brunei uprising started in 1962.

Half a year before the rebellion, in April or May 1962, the PRB asked the Sarawak Liberation League (SLL) to send a delegation in secret to discuss the political situation in North Kalimantan. At Canada Hill, which is close to Miri, the PRB delegation was received by the SLL delegates. The representatives of the PRB asserted that since the British colonial authority had refused them any lawful avenues for protest and had already sent their forces to Brunei, they were left with no choice but to employ force. The PRB resorted to violent conflict in response to the British colonial government's disregard for its mission, which resulted in the Brunei revolt on 8 December 1962. The primary leaders of the PRB were either arrested or fled to neighbouring countries, especially Indonesia, and there hasn't been enough analysis done on the links between this rebellion and the armed fight in Sarawak.

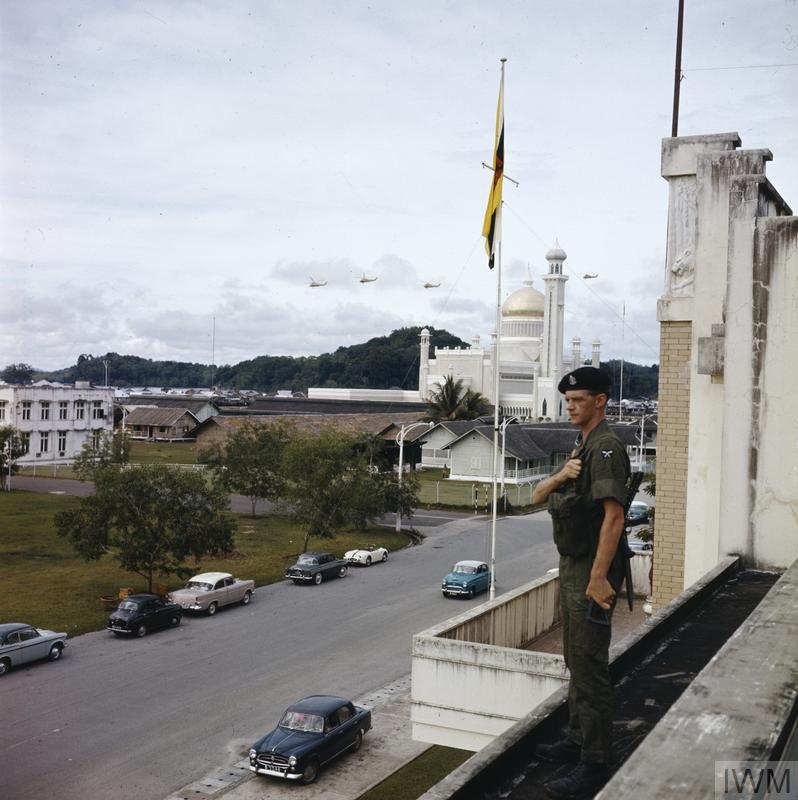
A Queen's Royal Irish Hussars soldier at the Secretariat Building in January 1963

Within days of the Sultan declaring a state of emergency, Singaporean British troops from the British Far East Command put an end to the uprising. The leaders were detained or exiled from once the PRB was outlawed. Even though it doesn't appear that any PRB personnel trained with the Sarawak youths in Indonesian territory, their political collaboration persisted. The LegCo was disbanded on 19 December 1962, and an Emergency Council took its place. The LegCo was placed under suspension in 2004 but was later reopened following additional constitutional modifications that increased the Sultan's authority. Brunei attained independence in 1984. However, since then, the state of emergency has been repeatedly extended, and Brunei commemorated its 50th year under emergency government in 2012.

=== Exile and current status ===
Following the defeat, Azahari escaped to Jakarta, where he remained in Bogor, West Java, when President Sukarno gave him shelter in 1963. After the failed uprising, he and his associates created an exile government with help from Malaysia and Indonesia. Relations between Brunei and Malaysia were tight since, until about 1975, Malaysia had backed his case at the United Nations (UN). However, his objectives were lessened as regional diplomatic connections strengthened and ASEAN was formed following the end of Konfrontasi.

From an operation headed by Sheikh Saleh Sheikh Mahmud, the nephew and brother of Azahari, Zaini and six other senior PRB detainees from the Berakas Detention Camp, including Yassin Affandi, managed to escape by sea to nearby Limbang in Sarawak on 12 July 1973, Sultan Omar Ali Saifuddien III's birthday. According to reports, Ghazali Shafie, who was Malaysia's Minister of Foreign Affairs at the time, secretly encouraged the escape because of the Sultan's 1963 rejection to join the Federation of Malaysia and Brunei's treatment of Malaysian public staff. This backing for the release of Zaini and others probably acted as a message to the Sultan to change his policies or else suffer the repercussions. Ten Bruneians, including Zaini, who had fled to Malaysia were granted political asylum by the Malaysian government as soon as they arrived, according to a report released by Utusan Malaysia on the 27.

In December 1973, an ad hoc committee for the Independence of Brunei was established in Kuala Lumpur. Subsequently, on 7 May 1974, the PRB was formally reactivated with the naming of an executive committee with Azahari as president. It primarily aimed at the intention of pressuring "friendly" states and international organizations to put pressure on Brunei to implement political changes in order to introduce representative government. For instance, Mahmud Saedon was tasked with lobbying the Indonesian government and reestablishing the party's ties with the Afro-Asian Peoples' Solidarity Organization (AAPSO).

Even though the leadership of Malaysia had provided the PRB (including its second-in-command Zaini) with permanent refuge in Kuala Lumpur and even supported their anti-colonial stance at the UN, a microstate whose leaders' understanding of "security" is in fact fundamentally related to the survival of its internal political structure might not find the "assurance" offered by that physically vast neighbor entirely comforting. What appears to be significant is that Zaini retained some of his natural optimism about the chances of bringing about a more democratic transition in Brunei during the years of struggle-in-exile, when he served as Sheikh Azahari's effective replacement as head of Indonesia.

On 12 September 2005, former political prisoner and Secretary General of PRB, Yassin, co-founded the National Development Party (NDP). With the demise of its former leaders Azahari, Zaini and Yassin in the 21st century, the PRB is now considered defunct.

== North Kalimantan National Army ==
The TNKU was formed in August 1960 at the residence of A. M. Azahari's father in Kampong Padang, near Brunei Town. This underground military wing of the PRB was established in the presence of PRB leaders, with Sheikh Othman, Azahari's brother, appointed as brigadier general of the TNKU. In March 1962, a war committee was convened to focus on recruitment and military training, consisting of members such as Sheikh Othman, Jais Haji Kiram, Mesir Keruddin, Jassin Affandy, Abdullah Jahfar, Mayor Mumin Ahmad, and Haji Yusuf Tamit. One of the early training sites was in Kampong Kilanas in the Tutong District, where recruits received military instruction from Pudin Ladi, Abdullah Jahfar, and Jais Haji Kiram. Following this initial training, a group of 40 recruits was sent for further instruction at Merapok, located on the border of Sabah and East Kalimantan (present-day North Kalimantan), under the guidance of the Indonesian National Army.

Before the outbreak of the 1962 Brunei revolt, Azahari claimed the TNKU had approximately 30,000 members, although the precise number was never substantiated. In the wake of the revolt, only 2,063 members were arrested. A pivotal meeting held in early December 1962 at Kampong Padang culminated in a decision to initiate an armed struggle, which Azahari sanctioned on 5 December. This decision was fueled by increasing impatience among recruits and the recent arrests of TNKU members in Sundar, Sarawak, who disclosed information about their activities during interrogations. As a result, at 2:00 a.m. on 8 December 1962, the TNKU launched the rebellion, prompting the government to declare a state of emergency and call for British military support from Singapore. Within a fortnight, most TNKU members had been apprehended, leading to the rapid suppression of the uprising.
