= Barisan Pemuda =

Former political party in Brunei

Youth Front Barisan Pemuda باريسن ڤمودا
- Abbreviation: BARIP
- President: Salleh Masri
- Secretary-General: Jamil Al-Sufri
- Founder: Pengiran Yusuf; Salleh Masri; Jamil Al-Sufri
- Founded: 12 April 1946
- Dissolved: 1948
- Preceded by: Persatuan Guru-Guru Melayu Brunei
- Succeeded by: Angkatan Pemuda Brunei; Partai Rakyat Brunei
- Women's wing: Kesatuan Kaum Ibu Melayu Pelita Brunei
- Membership: 15,000
- Ideology: Left-wing nationalism Malay nationalism Indonesian unificationism Anti-colonial nationalism
- Political position: Left-wing
- Religion: Sunni Islam
- Regional affiliation: Parti Kebangsaan Melayu Malaya
- Colours: Red and white
- Slogan: Hidup Melayu
- Anthem: Allah Peliharakan Sultan

Party flag

Barisan Pemuda (BARIP), also known as the Youth Front or Brunei Youth Front, was an early left-wing political party formed in Brunei. It began as a political youth organisation in late 1946 with the goal of bringing the Bruneian Malays together and achieving independence for Brunei. It was said that the three main founders of BARIP were Salleh Masri, Pengiran Yusuf, and Jamil Al-Sufri.

Motivated by nationalist movements throughout Southeast Asia, BARIP embraced emblems such as its Hidup Melayu motto (similar to UMNO) and Sang Saka Merah Putih flag (similar to the Indonesian flag), signifying its support for Indonesian National Revolution and as symbols of struggle. Despite its brief existence, BARIP was crucial in mid-20th century Brunei in advocating Malay nationalism and anti-colonial nationalism. It too prioritise social concerns, such as providing more schooling and government positions for Bruneian Malays over Chinese people.

== Background ==
The Persatuan Guru-Guru Melayu Brunei (PGGMB), which sought to safeguard and enhance the status of educators in the nation, was founded in the 1930s. To sow the seeds of leadership within the Malay community at the time, this organisation carried out a number of sociocultural initiatives that emphasised the importance of leadership in the field of education in Brunei. This increased consciousness among PGGMB members and Maktab Perguruan Sultan Idris (MPSI) graduate instructors eventually led to the establishment of a radical organisation in Brunei. The name of this organisation is Barisan Pemuda (Youth Front), often referred to as BARIP.

== History ==
=== Formation ===
Intellectuals in Brunei started to become more nationalist in 1946, especially those enrolled in Maktab Perguruan Sultan Idris (MPSI), Perak. Renowned for generating influential individuals within the Malay community, MPSI functioned as a center for political and cultural interchange between aspiring educators from North Kalimantan, which encompassed Brunei, and Malay Peninsula. Students there engaged in extensive discussion of sociopolitical issues impacting the Malay country, and it developed into an important training ground for political mobilisation. With a renewed sense of faith and a dedication to grasping and tackling social and political issues, these educators returned to their native regions, therefore strengthening the growing nationalist movement in Brunei and other locations.

On 24 March 1946 a dispute over fish prices between a Chinese customer and a Malay fishmonger in Brunei Town escalated into a broader conflict between the two communities. News of the fight quickly spread, leading several hundred Malays from nearby villages to prepare for a confrontation with the Chinese, who also readied themselves for defence. The Royal Military Police intervened promptly, imposing a curfew and arresting three Malay youths, thereby averting a larger clash and restoring order.

Founders of BARIP

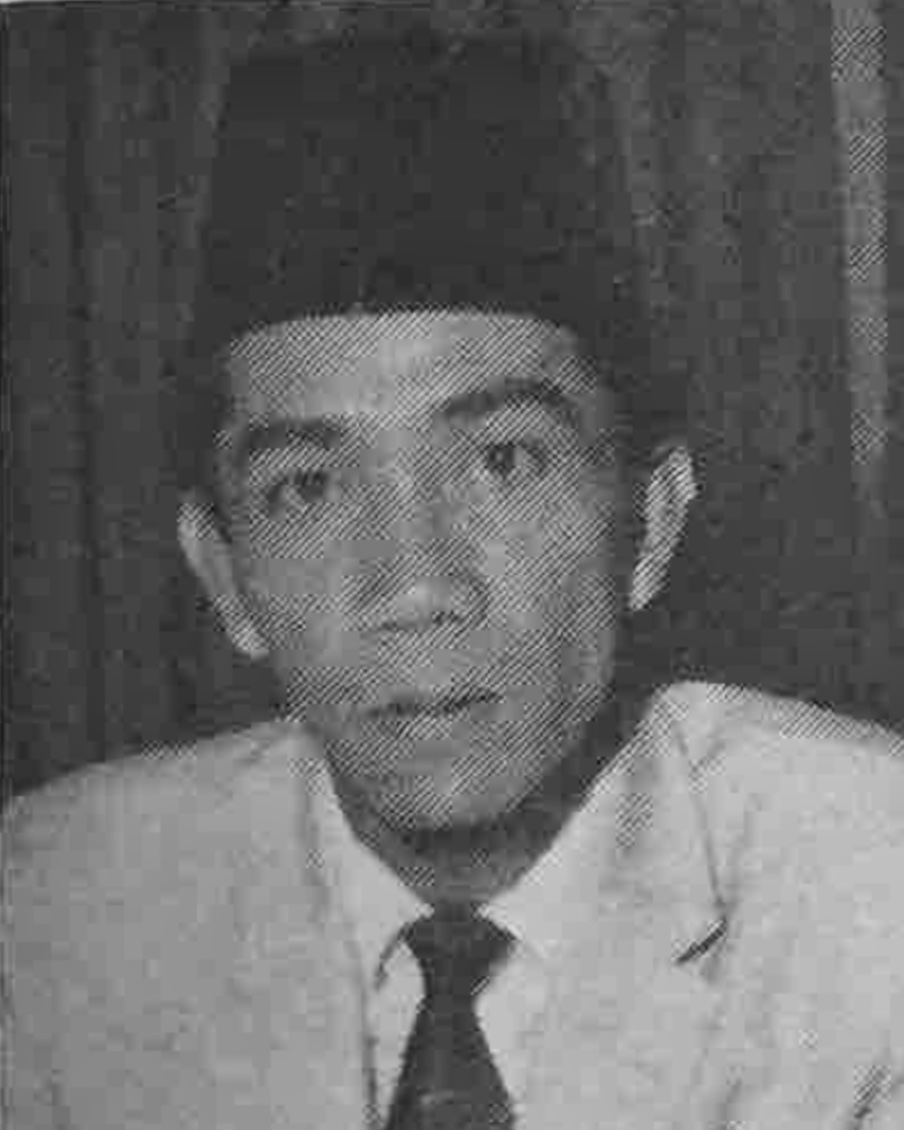
Pengiran Yusuf

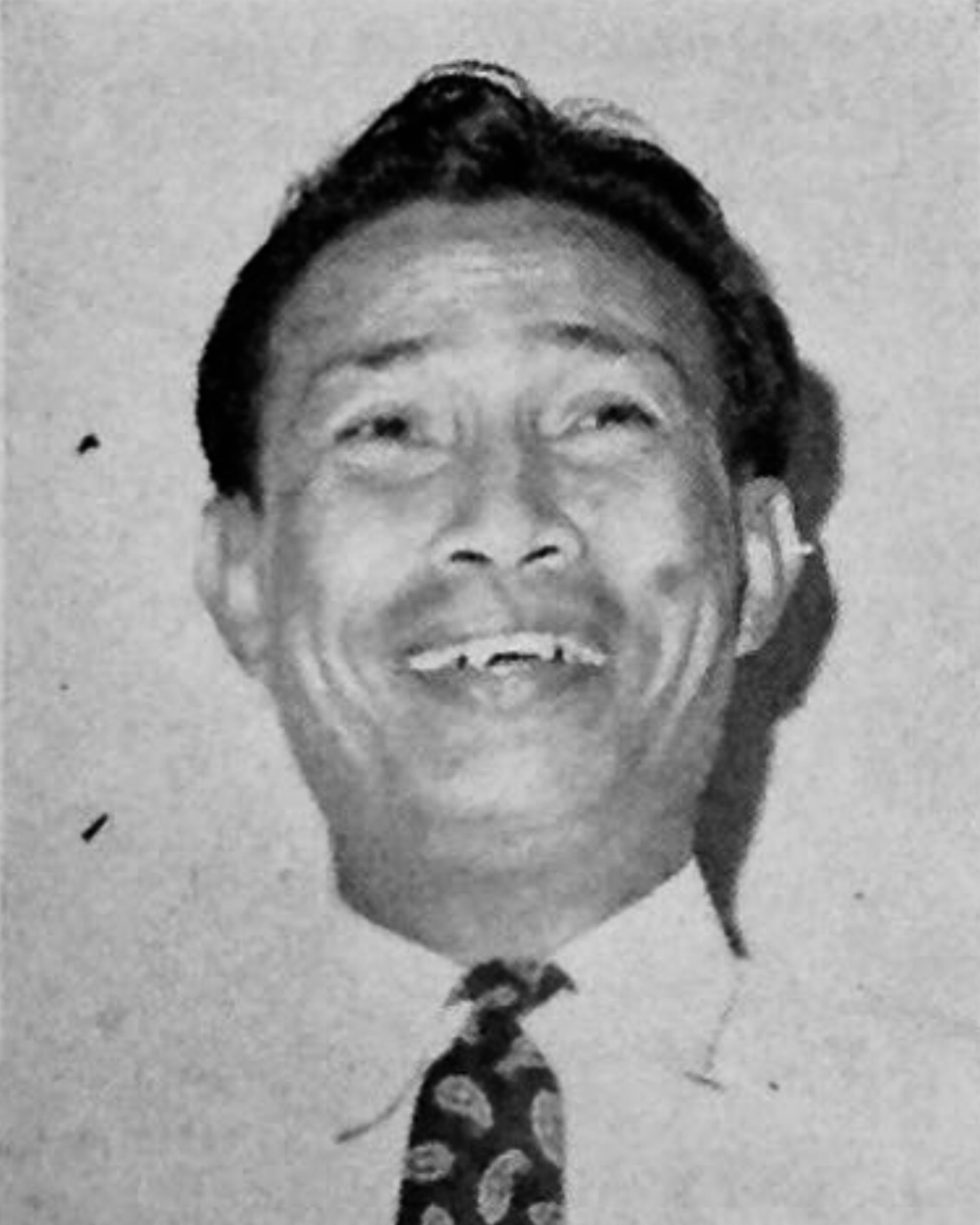
Salleh Masri

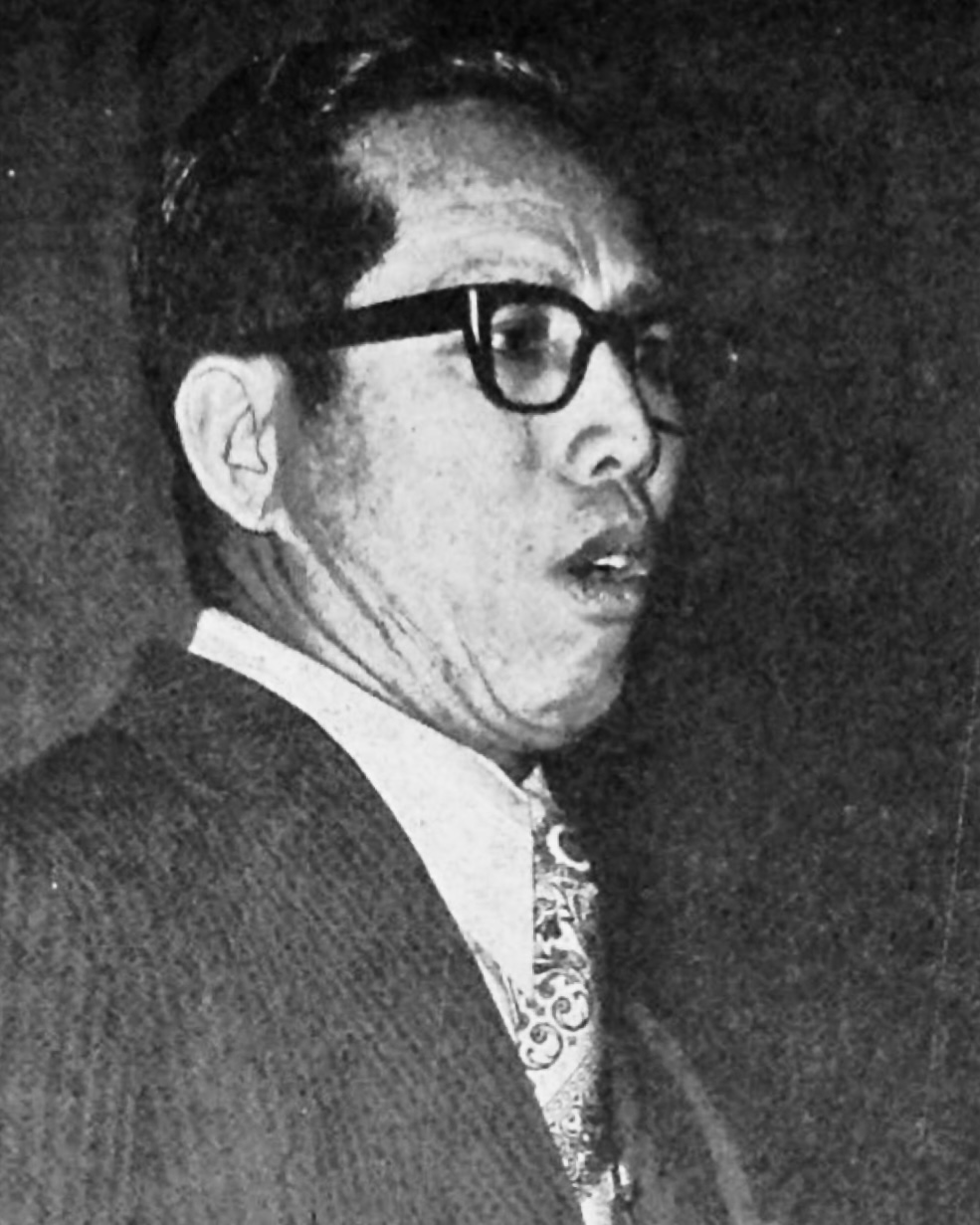
Jamil Al-Sufri

After the fish market incident, the Malays understood that they had to stick together to preserve their political power in the face of the more economically and educationally developed Chinese minority. Thus, on 12 April 1946, a group of young Malays (Pengiran Yusuf, Salleh Masri, Jamil Al-Sufri, Abdullah Jaafar, Abdul Hamid Othman, Pengiran Hidup, Tuah Puteh, and Zainal Puteh) met in secret in the Kampong Sungai Kedayan residence of Ya'akob Othman to create BARIP.

When the civil government returned in July, BARIP was formally formed despite the British Military Administration's (BMA) ban on assemblies. Notable office bearers included Abdullah Jaafar as President, Pengiran Yusuf as Vice President, and Jamil Al-Sufri as Secretary-General. This gave the impression that the local indigenous people are only allowed to take part. Sultan Ahmad Tajuddin said that BARIP "was agitating for youth of the country to be given posts in the Government service" despite the fact that the organisation is essentially not political. When BARIP was established at the close of 1946, it served as a platform for nationalists to advocate for Brunei's independence.

=== Rise to popularity ===
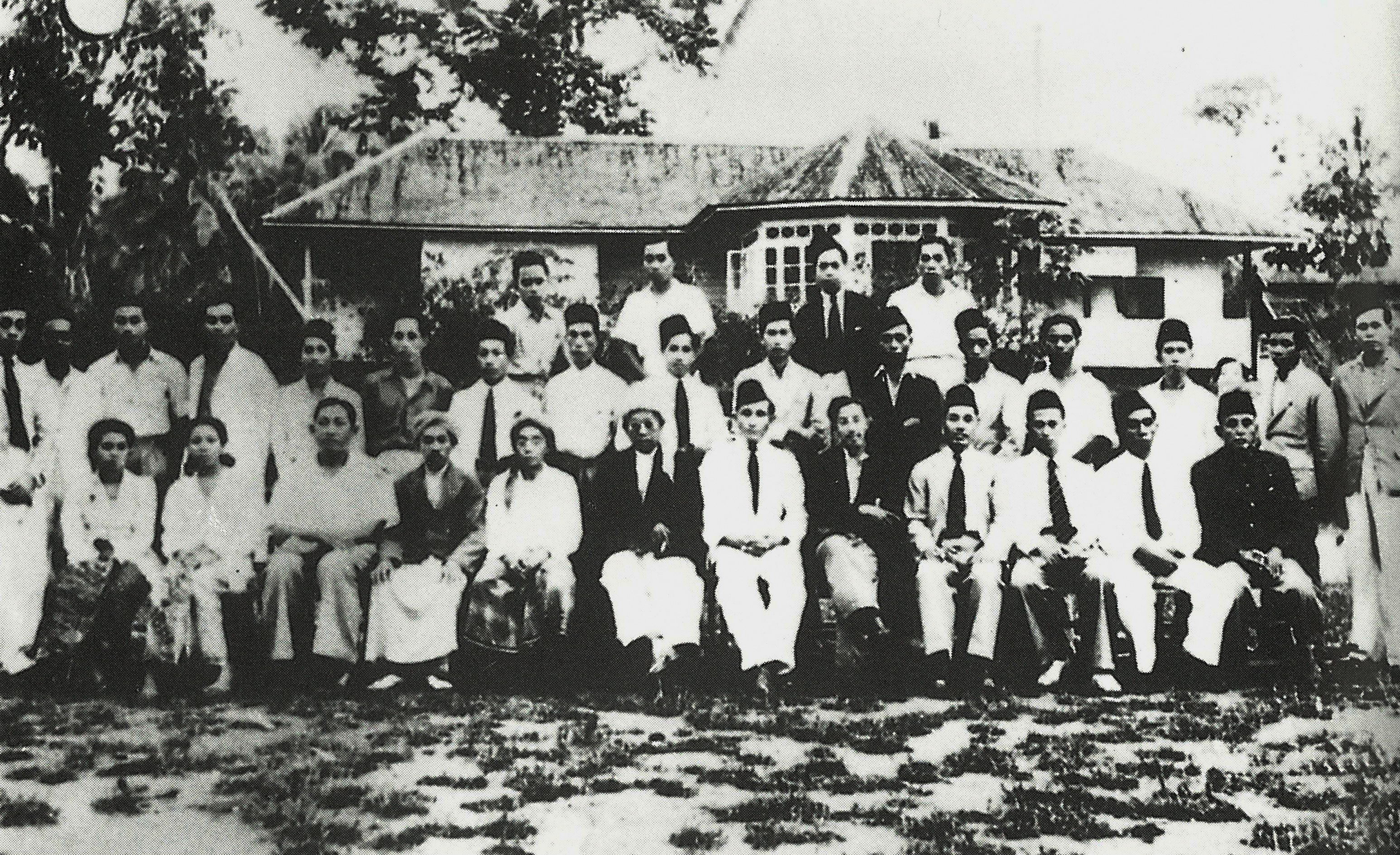
In front of Istana Sugara in 1946, Prince Omar Ali (seated fifth from the right) is accompanied by officials of the KMB, BARIP, and PGGMB

Most of the young educated Malays who made up BARIP were teachers, police officers, low-level civil servants, and a large number of jobless people. The younger members of this group felt that the elder Kesatuan Melayu Brunei (KMB; Brunei Malay Association) was too inactive in promoting the rights of Malay people. Driven by strong anti-Western sentiment and a desire for more forceful political action, these young men were motivated by the Indonesian National Revolution and affected by their experiences in Japanese military training camps during World War II. In an effort to aid in the country's independence from colonial authority, women founded the Kesatuan Kaum Ibu Melayu Pelita Brunei (KKIMPB), while men founded the BARIP.

Members of BARIP were clearly influenced by Indonesian nationalism, as seen by their "a fist and a shout: Merdeka! (freedom)" greeting. In spite of this display of nationalism, the group made no clear demands for Brunei's independence or self-government. Pengiran Yusuf stated that the main objective was to bring young Bruneians together to defend their rights against immigration by organising under the slogan "Brunei for Bruneians." Because of this, they believed that ending the BMA and restoring the British Residency would better serve the interests of the Malay people. The British Residency was reinstated on 6 July 1946, as a result of the military authorities informing the Colonial Office of the populace's want to return to civil governance.

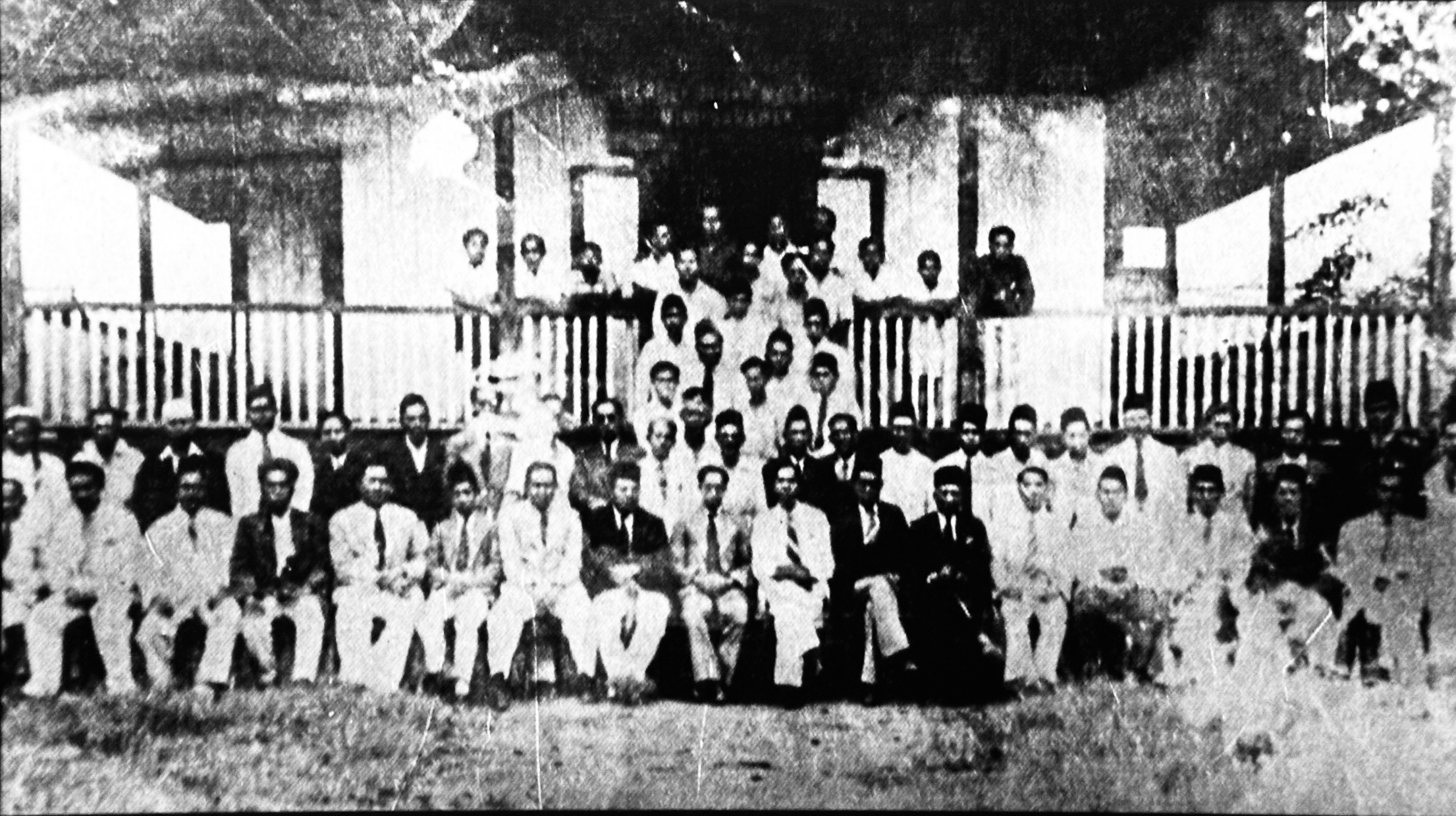
During a visit to Miri in late 1946, Prince Omar Ali, Salleh, and delegation members from BARIP and KMB posed for photos

To evaluate the political climate, Malcolm MacDonald landed in Brunei on 16 July 1946 as the new acting High Commissioner. Using this occasion to highlight their demands, the BARIP etched "Sole Right to the Sultan and his Subjects" on a welcoming arch in Brunei Town. British Resident William John Peel objected, threatening to demolish the arch in protest, and had it be altered to "Selamat Datang" (Welcome). Peel's decree was reversed by Sultan Ahmad Tajuddin, ending the dispute. In a petition to MacDonald, BARIP demanded that Malays be given preference in government posts, that Malays be trained to assume important administrative positions, that Chinese flags be banned, and that the Union Jack be used sparingly. They also asked Brunei's future as a Malay Islamic Monarchy and its independence to be taken into consideration by the British. In his correspondence with the Colonial Office, MacDonald just noted the rising concern among young Malays over Chinese influence, and he did not address the petition. Later on, Peel recalled informing a group from BARIP that Brunei was too young to declare independence at the time.

Flag of Brunei from 1906 to 1959

Members of BARIP were concerned when the BMA first returned to Brunei in 1945 and did not fly the flag of Brunei alongside the Union Jack. Peel answered by saying there wasn't enough material to make the Brunei flag. Members of BARIP called an urgent meeting to get the required supplies in response. Though yellow material was originally hard to come by, they were nevertheless able to raise funds and get white, black, and red cloth despite the post-war limitations. Pengiran Muda Abdul Kahar managed to obtain enough yellow cloth from his father, Pengiran Bendahara Pengiran Anak Haji Muhammad Yasin. A tailor quickly stitched together the flag and brought it to the British Resident along with a brand-new flagpole, indicating Brunei's presence and reaffirming its identity in this time of transition.

At its height, BARIP claimed to have over 15,000 supporters and members, with a substantial membership in several different places, including Labuan, Jesselton, and Papar. The organisation had 36 members on its leadership council, including well-known people like Salleh Masri, Pengiran Yusuf, Jamil Al-Sufri, and others. A red carpet greeting awaited Salleh Masri upon his arrival in Jesselton later in 1947, after he took over as leader in early July 1946. However, by August 1947, the movement had started to wane as it failed to gain traction as a political party. The aggressive, collective character of BARIP, together with its roots in Indonesian nationalism, were factors in its decline.

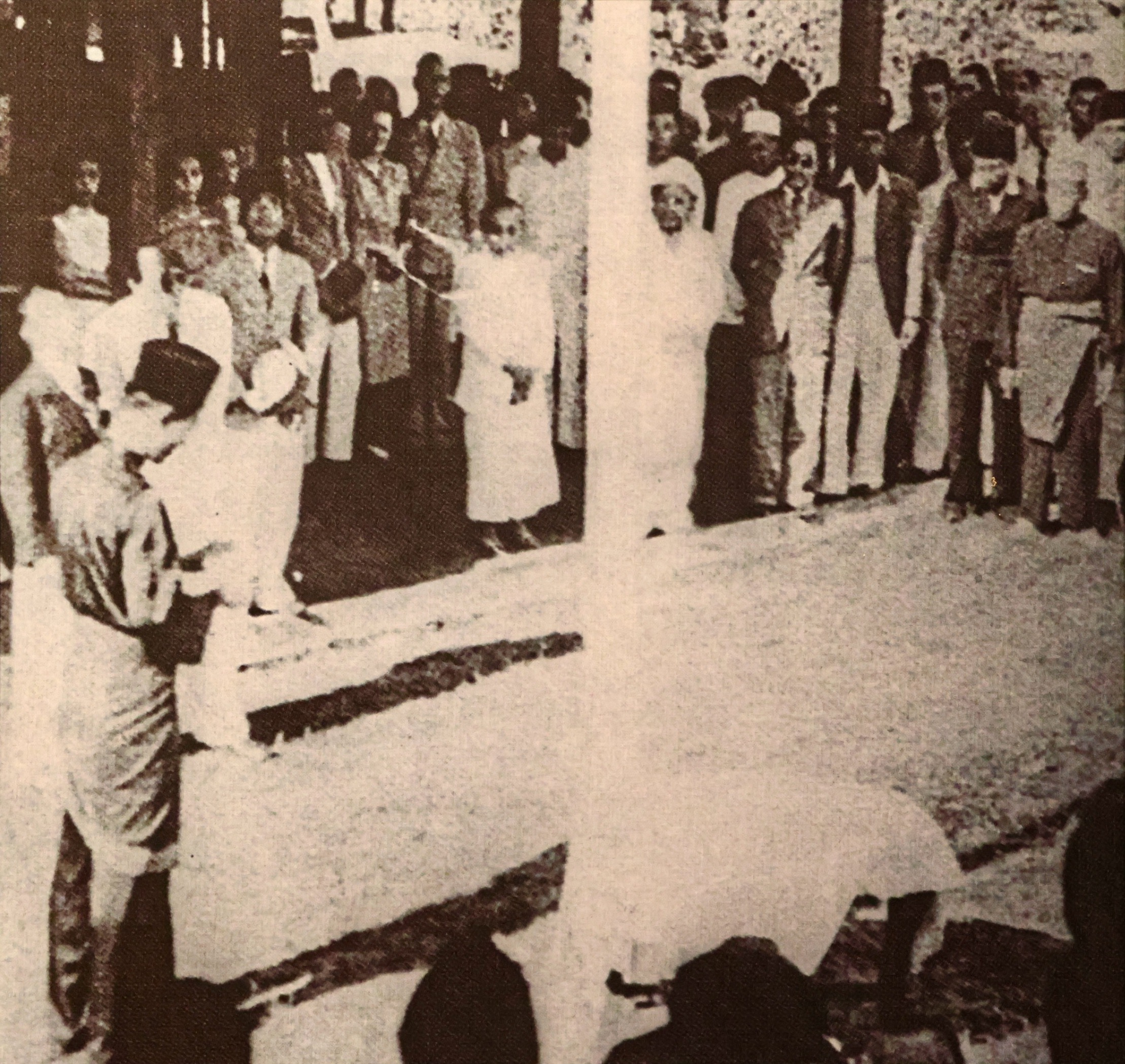
Senior government representatives witnessing Ahmad Tajuddin hoisting the BARIP flag on 12 April 1947

Salleh Masri was appointed to take over as president of BARIP moving ahead, succeeding former President Abdullah Jahfar, who quit after serving for just five months. Between 1947 and 1948, during the period of the party's reconstitution, he presided over as its president. At the first anniversary celebration of BARIP's founding on 12 April 1947, in front of an estimated 2,000 people, President Salleh Masri pledged the association's loyalty to Sultan Ahmad Tajuddin. The Sultan would also give his approval to fly the BARIP flag, which was red and white and has the symbol of the moon and stars. They sang patriotic songs which would later be adopted as the country's national anthem, Allah Peliharakan Sultan.

=== Decline and dissolution ===
Intellectuals like Salleh Masri, Pengiran Yusuf, Yassin Affandi, and Jamil Al-Sufri committed themselves to their families while fighting for national advancement despite obstacles including poverty and a lack of governmental authority. The British were concerned about BARIP because of its violent and communal character, as well as its roots in Indonesian nationalism. They perceived it as a possible danger to their interests in the area. These worries were heightened by Sultan Ahmad Tajuddin's comments made in February 1947 during a private visit to Malaya, in which he showed sympathy for the Indonesian war of independence. The movement was also seen as a roadblock to Brunei's proposed political and constitutional changes. Thus, the British sought to weaken the young movement by scattering its leadership: Hashim Tahir and Hidup Besar were sent to isolated areas, while Pengiran Yusuf and Jamil Al-Sufri were sent back to Malaya for teacher training.

British tactics and the movement's own successes are to blame for BARIP's downfall. The Malay public servants suspended by the government in the middle of 1947 had been restored on suspicion of conspiracy. BARIP leader, Salleh Masri, stated he turned down an offer of a top job in the Department of Education because he wanted to continue spearheading the campaign. The Malay people was briefly pleased by the British administration's increased sensitivity to their fears about Chinese dominance in Brunei. In addition, many young people found employment through government and oil company rehabilitation programs, which decreased their engagement in political activities.

With the introduction of the Societies Enactment in October 1948 and the Sedition Enactment in April 1948, the British further restricted the operations of organised entities in Brunei. The Sedition Enactment sought to stop actions that may stir up hatred between races or social classes as well as to stop the importation of "undesirable" books, particularly those coming from Indonesia. The Societies Enactment, which excluded political groups and only permitted the registration of socio-economic and cultural entities, handed BARIP its fatal blow. BARIP was forced to amend its constitution as a result, and it was reborn as Angkatan Pemuda Brunei (APB) in 1948 with an emphasis on socioeconomic development and cultural preservation. But the APB did not have the same level of popularity as its predecessor, and in 1956 it was replaced by the Partai Rakyat Brunei (PRB).
