= North Borneo Federation =

Former proposed political entity

Federation of North Borneo Kesatuan Kalimantan Utara (Malay)
- Flag

- The territory of the proposed federation
- Status: Proposed federation states
- Capital: Brunei Town (de facto)
- Recognised regional languages: Malay
- Religion: Sunni Islam
- Membership: Brunei; Sarawak; North Borneo
- Government: Constitutional monarchy
  - Sultan: Omar Ali Saifuddin III
  - Prime Minister: A.M. Azahari
- Historical era: Brunei revolt
  - Established: 1961
  - Disestablished: 1962
- Currency: Malayan dollar
- Today part of: Brunei; Malaysia

The North Borneo Federation, also known as North Kalimantan (Malay: Negara Kesatuan Kalimantan Utara, lit. 'Unitary State of North Kalimantan'), was a proposed political entity which would have comprised the British colonies of Sarawak, British North Borneo (now known as the Malaysian state of Sabah) and the protectorate of Brunei.

== Attempts for the establishment ==
In 1956, the governments of Sarawak, North Borneo and the State of Brunei announced that they would abandon the Malayan dollar and adopt a common currency of their own, but that never came into being.

The idea of the North Kalimantan was proposed by Brunei's People Party President, A. M. Azahari, who had forged links with Sukarno's nationalist movement, together with Ahmad Zaidi, in Java in the 1940s. The idea supported and propagated the unification of all Borneo territories under British rule to form an independent leftist North Kalimantan state. Azahari personally favoured Brunei's independence and merging with British North Borneo and Sarawak to form the federation with the Sultan of Brunei as the constitutional monarch. In his capacity as the spokesperson for Bruneian politics, he made clear that the Brunei revolt was really against British colonialism and the Malaysia plan, with the goal of creating a Unitary State of North Borneo led by himself as prime minister and the Sultan as a constitutional monarch. While in Manila, he declared the formation of his government's war cabinet for Kalimantan Utara, or North Kalimantan.

The North Borneo (or Kalimantan Utara) proposal was seen as a post-decolonisation alternative by local opposition against the Malaysia plan. Local opposition throughout the Borneo territories was primarily based on economic, political, historical and cultural differences between the Borneo states and Malaya, as well as the refusal to be subjected under peninsular political domination. Joining to form Malaysia was seen as a new form of colonialism under Malaya.

The basic concept behind the formation of a union of British Borneo was partly based upon the Federation of Rhodesia and Nyasaland in Southern Africa. After the defeat of the revolutionaries in the Brunei Revolt, the idea was put to rest. Had the federation been formed, the capital city would probably have been chosen from Kuching (capital of Sarawak), Jesselton (present-day Kota Kinabalu, capital of Sabah) or Bandar Brunei (present-day Bandar Seri Begawan, capital of Brunei and the historical capital of the region).

The Sultanate of Brunei has traditionally opposed such a federation. When it was first proposed during the 1960s the Sultan of Brunei favoured joining Malaysia, though, in the end, disagreements concerning the nature of such a federation, and also disputes over oil royalties stopped this from happening.
