= Brunei National Solidarity Party =

Former political party in Brunei

- Malay name: Parti Perpaduan Kebangsaan Brunei فرتي فرفادوان كبغسأن بروني
- Chinese name: 文莱民族团结党; Wénlái mínzú tuánjié dǎng
- Tamil name: புரூனி தேசிய ஒற்றுமை கட்சி Purūṉi tēciya oṟṟumai kaṭci'
- Abbreviation: BNSP and PPKB
- President: Hatta Zainal Abidin
- Registered: February 1986
- Dissolved: February 2008
- Split from: Brunei National Democratic Party
- Succeeded by: Vision Party (Parti Wawasan, 17 June 2026)
- Membership: 150
- Ideology: Melayu Islam Beraja; Constitutional monarchism
- Political position: Centre
- Religion: Sunni Islam
- Colours: Yellow

Brunei National Solidarity Party (BNSP), natively known as the Parti Perpaduan Kebangsaan Brunei (PPKB), was a political party established in Brunei. The party quickly gained recognition, composed of business people loyal to Sultan Hassanal Bolkiah, with principles based on Sunni Islam and liberal nationalism. Internal issues led to the formation of the PPKB in February 1986, which the Sultan also approved.

The PPKB held its first national assembly in 1995, but its president was forced to step down, and the party's activities were heavily monitored. Despite attempts to campaign on various issues, the PPKB remained marginal, and in 2008, it was officially dissolved without explanation. Since then, the National Development Party (NDP) has been the only officially registered political party in Brunei.

== History ==
=== Formation ===
The Parti Kebangsaan Demokratik Brunei (PKDB) was established as a new political party in May 1985. The new party quickly gained official recognition and was composed of business people who were loyal to Sultan Hassanal Bolkiah. Its principles were based on Sunni Islam and liberal nationalism. It promoted democracy, more fair economic distribution, and more involvement in government management. However, the Sultan forbade party participation for those employed by the government, who made up around 40% of the working people in the nation, as well as for those who belonged to the Chinese community.

A split resulting from internal problems within the PKDB led to the founding of the Parti Perpaduan Kebangsaan Brunei (PPKB), commonly known as the Brunei National Solidarity Party (BNSP) in English, in February 1986. The Sultan also approved of the new party, which was accessible to Muslims and non-Muslims and focused more on working with the government.

=== Turbulent years ===
The PKDB's suspension and the two founders' two years in prison were brought about by the Internal Security Act in January 1988. President Abdul Latif Hamid and Secretary-General Abdul Latif Chuchu were accused of violating the Societies Act by failing to file annual reports and by unlawfully affiliating with the Asia Pacific Democracy Union (APDU), an international organisation. This seemingly unrestricted approach to political parties came to an end. The party was suspended when it called for the 26-year state of emergency to end, democratic elections to be held, and the Sultan to retire as Head of Government (but not as Head of State or figurehead). Following that, PKKB became quiet and kept a low profile.

The first general meeting of the district and village councils, which were founded in 1993, took place in May 1996. A new draft constitution was presented to the Sultan for evaluation in 1994 by a constitutional committee led by Prince Mohamed Bolkiah, which the Sultan had authorised to study the 1959 constitutional arrangements. The PPKB was allowed to conduct its first national assembly in February 1995, during which time Abdul Latif Chuchu, the organisation's recently elected president, reaffirmed support for the Sultan and the Melayu Islam Beraja (MIB). But he also demanded democratic elections, and the government quickly compelled him to step down by reiterating the emergency order. In fact, the party leader—a former political prisoner—was quickly the subject of suspicion from the authorities, and in September 1995, he was forced to step down as president. The party's operations would continue to be restricted and strictly watched. Although there are plans to amend the 1959 constitution, it is doubtful that these plans, or any action to lift the emergency order that was put in place in 1962 following the Brunei revolt, would be made public anytime soon.

=== Later years and dissolution ===
After three years of inactivity, the PPKB had its annual general meeting in May 1998, whereby business leader Hatta Zainal Abidin was elected as the organisation's new president. During the Amedeo Crisis in May 2000, the party momentarily expressed alert over claims of government corruption, but it quickly descended into division in an effort to remove its President.

The resignation of Deputy President Osman Omar, to concentrate on his business endeavours was a blow to PPKB. Political parties in Brunei have remained marginal and their significance has been questioned because of their sparse and insignificant activity since the Legislative Council of Brunei was suspended in 1970. The PPKB launched a campaign in 2002 to mobilise the Muslim population against Western meddling in the affairs of Muslim nations by advocating for a boycott of American, British, and Australian goods. However, the campaign was not much publicised or supported. The PPKB also protested in writing to the American embassy, calling on the administration to take a more understanding view of the situation facing the Palestinian people.

Officially dissolved in February 2008, PKKB gave no reason for its dissolution. The National Development Party (NDP) would thereafter be the only political party that is officially registered.
