= Brunei revolt =

Failed 1962 revolt in the British protectorate

- Part of the Indonesia–Malaysia confrontation and formation of Malaysia
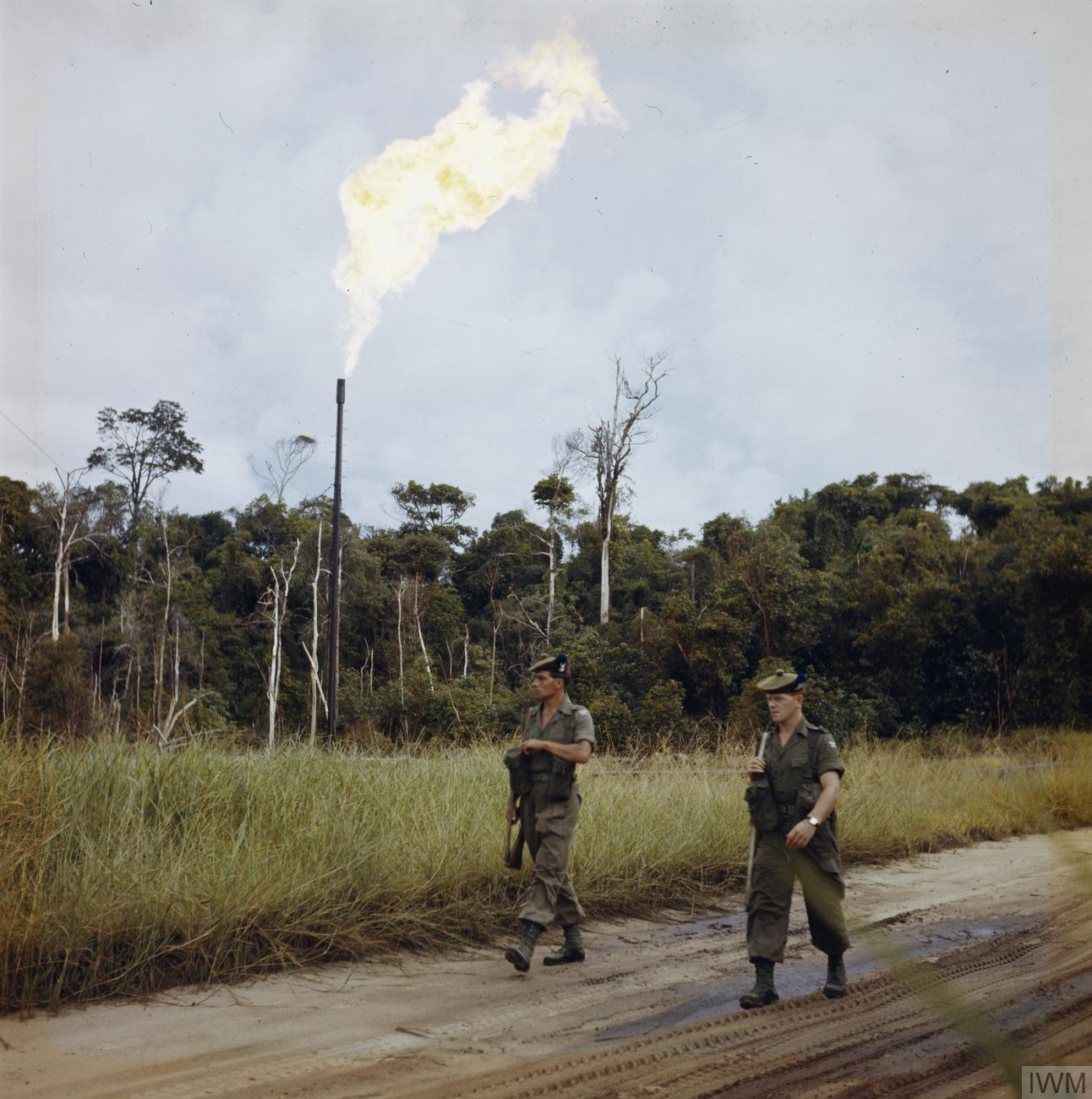
- Queen's Own Highlanders on guard in the Seria oilfield.
Date	8–17 December 1962 (9 days)
Location	Brunei
Result	British Commonwealth victory: Brunei People's Party is banned; Brunei retains its absolute monarchy; Brunei continues as a British protectorate until 1984

Belligerents
Commonwealth of Nations; United Kingdom; Brunei; North Borneo; Malaya	Brunei People's Party Supported by: Indonesia

Commanders and leaders
Nigel Poett; Walter Walker; Omar Ali Saifuddien III; Marsal Maun	A.M. Azahari; Zaini Ahmad (POW); Yassin Affandi (POW)

Units involved
British Armed Forces; North Borneo Police Force	North Kalimantan National Army

Strength
2,000–6,000	4,000

Casualties and losses
6 dead	40 dead 3,400 captured
- unknown civilian casualties

The Brunei revolt (Malay: Pemberontakan Brunei) or Brunei rebellion of 1962 was an insurrection in the British protectorate of Brunei by opponents of its monarchy's proposed inclusion in the Federation of Malaysia. The insurgents were members of the TNKU (North Kalimantan National Army), a militia supplied by Indonesia and linked to the left-wing Brunei People's Party (BPR), which favoured a pro-Indonesian North Borneo Federation.

The TNKU began co-ordinated attacks on the oil town of Seria (targeting the Royal Dutch Shell oil installations), on police stations, and on government facilities around the protectorate. The revolt began to break down within hours, having failed to achieve key objectives such as the capture of Brunei Town and Sultan Omar Ali Saifuddien III. The revolt influenced the Sultan's decision the following year not to join Malaysia. It is seen as one of the first stages of the Indonesia–Malaysia confrontation.

== Background ==
The northern part of the island of Borneo was composed of three British territories: the colonies of Sarawak and North Borneo (to be renamed Sabah) and the protectorate of the Sultanate of Brunei. Brunei became a British protectorate in 1888, had an area of about 2,226 square miles (5,800 km^{2}) and some 85,000 people. Just over half of the people were Malays, a quarter were Chinese, and the rest were Dayaks, the indigenous people of Borneo. Oil was discovered in 1929 near Seria and the Brunei Shell Petroleum Company concession provided the Sultanate with a huge income. The capital, then called Brunei Town, was on a river some 10 miles (20 km) from the coast.

In 1959, the Sultan, Sir Omar Ali Saifuddin III, established a legislature with half its members nominated and half elected. Elections were held in September 1962 and all of the contested seats were won by the Brunei People's Party.

Between 1959 and 1962, the United Kingdom, Malaya, Singapore, North Borneo and Sarawak were involved in negotiations to form a new Malaysian Federation. However, the Philippines and particularly Indonesia opposed any move toward unification of North Borneo and Sarawak with the new federation. This external opposition toward unification strengthened by widespread anti-Federation sentiment within Sarawak and Brunei itself. The Brunei People's Party was in favour of joining Malaysia on condition of the unification of the three crown colonies of northern Borneo (total about 1.5 million people, half Dayak) with their own sultan. It was thought that the resultant sultanate would be strong enough to resist domination by Malaya or Singapore, Malay administrators or Chinese merchants. Local opposition and sentiments against the Malaysian Federation plan have often been under-represented in historical writings on the Brunei rebellion and the subsequent Indonesia-Malaysia confrontation. In fact, political forces in Sarawak had long anticipated their own national independence as promised (but later aborted) by the last White Rajah of Sarawak, Charles Vyner Brooke, in 1941.

The North Kalimantan (or Kalimantan Utara) proposal was seen as a post-decolonisation alternative by local opposition against the Malaysian Federation plan. Local opposition throughout the Borneo territories was primarily based on economic, political, historical and cultural differences between the Borneo states and the Malayan peninsula, and an unwillingness to be subjected to peninsular political domination.

However, before the Brunei People's Party electoral success, a military wing had emerged, the North Kalimantan National Army saw itself as an anti-colonialist liberation party. Its sympathies lay with Indonesia which was seen as having better 'liberationist' credentials than Malaya and Singapore. Its 34-year-old leader A.M. Azahari had lived in Indonesia and was in touch with Indonesian intelligence agents. In his capacity as the spokesperson for Bruneian politics, he made clear that the uprising was really against British colonialism and the Malaysia plan, with the goal of creating a Unitary State of North Borneo led by himself as prime minister and the Sultan as a constitutional monarch. While in Manila, he declared the formation of his government's war cabinet for Kalimantan Utara, or North Kalimantan. He had recruited several officers who had been trained in clandestine warfare in Indonesia. By late 1962, they could muster about 4000 men, a few modern weapons and about 1000 shotguns.

== Prelude ==
Hints of brewing trouble came in early November 1962 when the Resident for the 5th Division of Sarawak, Richard Morris (an Australian), who was based in Limbang (sandwiched between the two parts of Brunei) received information. Special Branch police from Kuching visited Limbang but only found some illegal uniforms with TNKU badges. Later in November, Morris heard that an insurrection was planned for Brunei, but not before 19 December. Claude Fenner, the Inspector General of the Malayan Police flew to Sarawak to investigate but found no evidence. However, the Chief of Staff in the British Far East Headquarters in Singapore did review and update the contingency plan, PALE ALE, for Brunei. However, the risk was assessed as low and the British Far East Land, Sea and Air Commanders-in-Chief were away from Singapore as was the operational commander of land forces, Major General Walter Walker.

On 6 December, Morris heard the rebellion would start on the 8th. The next day similar information reached John Fisher, the resident of the 4th Division of Sarawak, who was based in Miri some 20 miles (30 km) west of Brunei. As a result, police were put on full alert through Brunei, North Borneo and Sarawak, and Police Field Force reinforcements were flown from Kuching to Miri.

Yassin Affandi had been elected in August 1962 to the position of District Councillor. He was the "Overall Commander" of TNKU. On 8 December 1962 he read Kalimantan Utara's proclamation of independence, marking the start of the Brunei revolt.

== Battle ==
=== First ten days ===
The rebellion broke out at 2:00 am on 8 December. Signals from Brunei to British Far East Headquarters reported rebel attacks on police stations, the Sultan's Istana (Istana Darul Hana), the Chief Minister's house (Rumah Jerambak) and the power station, and that another rebel force was approaching the capital by water. Far East Headquarters ordered ALE YELLOW, which placed a force of two Gurkha infantry companies on 48 hours notice to move.

Most of the attacks in Brunei town were repulsed although the electricity supply was cut off. At this stage it was not known that rebels had attacked police stations throughout Brunei, in the 5th Division of Sarawak and on the western edge of North Borneo. Miri was still in government hands but Limbang had been taken by the rebels. The situation was most serious in Seria where the rebels had captured the police station and were dominating the oilfields.

Nine hours after ALE YELLOW, ALE RED was ordered and two companies of 1st Battalion, 2nd Gurkha Rifles, of 99th Infantry Brigade, moved to the RAF airfields at Changi and Seletar in Singapore to fly to Labuan Island in Brunei Bay. The Gurkhas' embarkation went slowly because the RAF was unprepared and following normal peacetime procedures. The troops were in a Bristol Britannia of No. 99 Squadron and three Blackburn Beverleys from the No. 32 Squadron, and the latter were diverted in flight from Labuan to Brunei Airfield when it was learned that this was not in rebel hands.

The Beverleys landed at about 10:00 pm and the Gurkhas advanced into Brunei. They fought a series of actions, suffering six casualties, two fatal. A small group of Gurkhas led by Captain Digby Willoughby rescued the Sultan and took him to police headquarters. An advance to Seria met strong opposition and returned to Brunei to counter a rebel threat to its centre and the airfield.

On 9 December, John Fisher called on the Dayak tribes for help by sending a boat with the traditional Red Feather of War up the Baram River. Tom Harrisson, the Curator of the Sarawak Museum in Kuching and leader of resistance to the Japanese in the Second World War also arrived in Brunei. He summoned the Kelabits from the highlands around Bario in the 5th Division, the centre of his wartime resistance. Hundreds of Dayaks responded, and formed into companies led by British civilians all commanded by Harrisson. This force reached some 2,000 strong, and with excellent knowledge of the tracks through the interior (there were no roads), helped contain the rebels and cut off their escape route to Indonesia.

Meanwhile, reinforcements flowed into Labuan. The 2nd Gurkhas were brought up to battalion strength. On 10 December, the Far East 'spearhead battalion', the Queen's Own Highlanders began arriving in Brunei. Brigadier Arthur Patterson, commander 99th Gurkha Infantry Brigade arrived to take overall command from Brigadier Pat Glennie, normally the Brigadier General Staff at Far East HQ. Both reported to Lieutenant General Sir Nigel Poett, the Far East Land Forces Commander in Singapore. Seria and Limbang remained in rebel hands. Further reinforcements arrived in the following days. These enabled Seria and Limbang to be recaptured.

By 17 December, the rebellion had been held and broken. Some 40 rebels were dead and 3,400 captured. The remainder had fled and were assumed to be trying to reach Indonesia. Of the leaders, Azahari was in the Philippines and Yassin Affandi was with the fugitives.

=== Seria ===
The road route to Seria was judged too vulnerable to ambush and there were no naval resources for a move by sea. Reconnaissance by an Army Air Corps Beaver revealed rebel flags over the Shell complex, and the 6 miles (10 km) of coast seemed in rebel hands. However, there appeared to be a potential landing site for light aircraft west of Seria and east of the town – the runway at Anduki Airfield had been cleared by a small group of western civilians who had managed to escape the rebels. One escapee, Hugh McDonald, a Shell contractor and WWII veteran, made contact with Singapore installations to confirm a safe landing. On 10 December, a company of the Queen's Own Highlanders boarded five Twin Pioneers and a Beverley at Brunei. The Twin Pioneers landed west of Seria and the Beverley at Anduki. A police station 2 miles (3 km) from the western landing was recaptured and so was the Telecommunications Centre after a brief fight. Anduki airfield was quickly recaptured. However, the main Seria police station, with 48 hostages, most Shell expatriates, was not secured until the 12th.

Anduki Airfield is today a grass airstrip with a concrete ramp used almost exclusively by Brunei Shell Petroleum aircraft and helicopters servicing Brunei's extensive offshore petroleum production installations. The Sultan of Brunei and members of the royal family sometimes use it in their helicopters when they wish to visit Seria, especially on State occasions. Regarded as strategically important because of its proximity to the oil town of Seria, its history in the Brunei Revolt and the paucity of other Brunei airstrips usable by fixed-wing military aircraft, Anduki and the adjacent highway to Bandar Seri Begawan is one of the first areas to be secured by Gurkha and Brunei Army troops when they deploy on contemporary war exercises.

=== Executions at Temburong ===
On 8 December 1962, from two till five in the morning, shots could be heard near police stations all over Brunei. According to news received from Temburong, the District Officer Pengiran Haji Besar bin Pengiran Haji Kula and a few others from Brunei security forces and a number of civilians were executed for refusing to join in the rebellion.

By five in the morning, TNKU controlled Pekan Besar. News came that a number of civil servants at Brunei Town had managed to escape capture. Around an hour later at downtown, the Deputy Chief Minister Pengiran Ali was granted an audience by the Sultan. After the meeting, the Sultan made a radio declaration condemning TNKU, the armed wing of the Brunei People's Party, for treason.

=== Assault on Limbang ===
In Limbang, rebels attacked the local police station, killing five local policemen. The rebels then obtained the surrender of British official R.H. Morris, his wife, four other Europeans and an American Peace Corps worker, and took the remaining police officers hostage. On the first night of their captivity, they were crowded into the police cells, the second night they were moved to the local hospital where they overheard the rebels planning their hangings the following day.

Eighty-nine Marines of 42 Commando had arrived in Brunei on 11 December, led by Captain Jeremy Moore (who later commanded the British Forces during the Falklands War). After acquiring two landing craft, the Marines were transported to Limbang by Royal Navy crews led by Captain Jeremy Black (who later commanded HMS Invincible (R05) during the Falklands War) and staged their arrival at dawn, 13 December. The landing craft had manually operated ramps which took too long to lower and the senior officer took the decision that the Marines would vault over the sides or over the ramps under covering fire from Vickers machine guns mounted on the bridges. One landing craft's bridge was raked with Bren gun fire, disabling the crew, and the craft rammed into the river bank and quay.

The only map they had was 10 years old at the time. The Marines lost the element of surprise due to the loud noise of their boats, but succeeded nevertheless in suppressing the rebels' machine guns and landed.

The attackers started their search for the hostages who, on hearing shots, began singing the American song "She'll Be Coming 'Round the Mountain", allowing the first rescue party to quickly locate them. The first rescue party was attacked and two of the three Marines were killed. A second rescue party fought off the rebels from around the hospital and freed the hostages. About 300 rebels, who had little if any military training and a paltry assortment of weapons (about a dozen Bren light machine guns and Lee–Enfield rifles, but mainly shotguns, muskets and daggers), tried to resist, but were beaten back.

Five Marines were killed and eight wounded in the attack. British sources do not list rebel losses in this incident, but Clodfelter estimates losses in the Brunei Rebellion as 40 rebels and six Marines.

There is a memorial to all the dead in Limbang. The leader of the Limbang rebels was caught and tried and received an eleven-year prison sentence. He lives (2007) on the outskirts of Limbang.

=== Mopping up ===
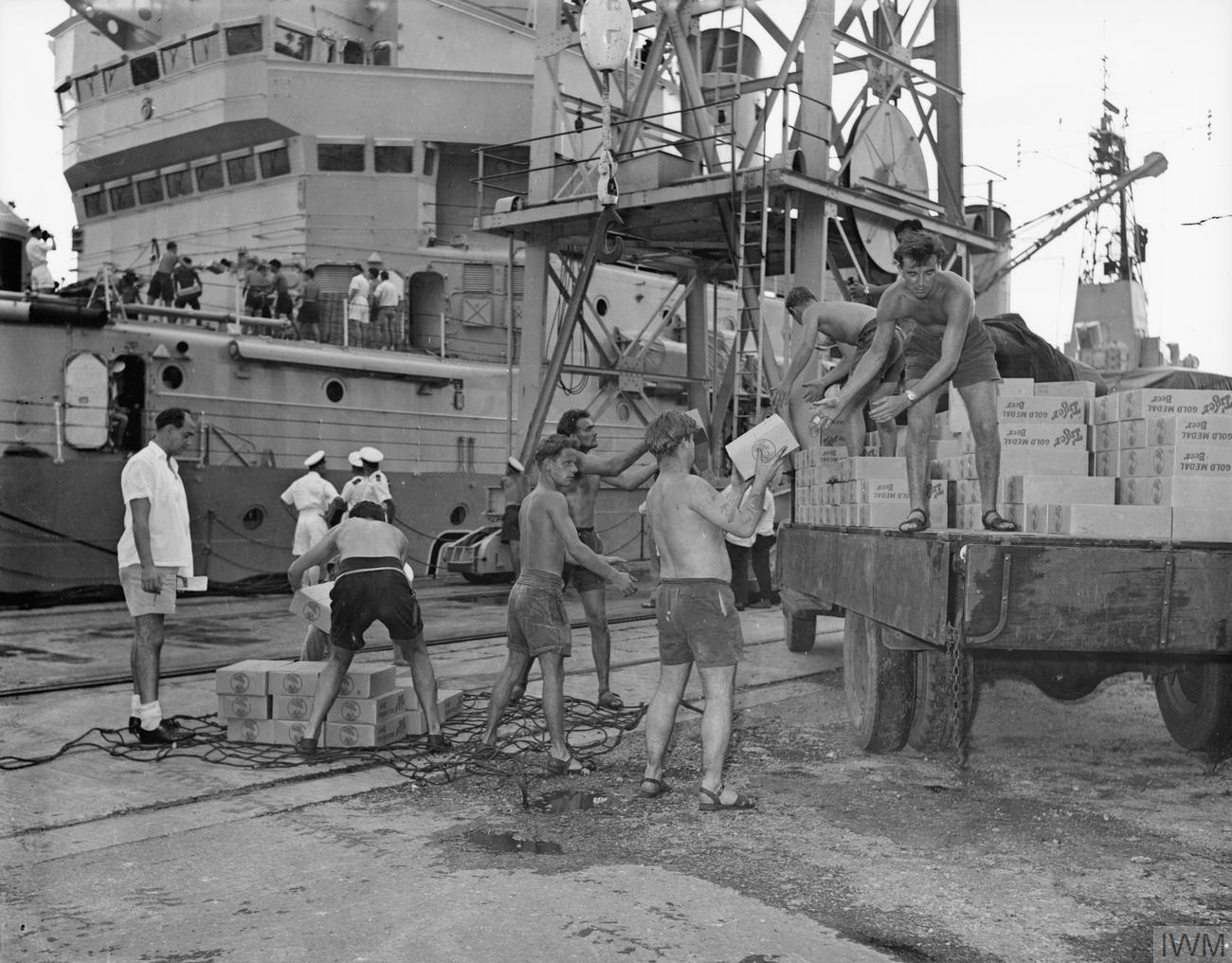
HMS Tiger unloads supplies and gear for naval troops in Brunei

By 17 December 42 Commando was complete in Brunei and 1st Green Jackets (43rd and 52nd) had landed from the cruiser HMS Tiger (C20) in Miri. 40 Commando aboard the commando carrier HMS Albion (R07) was diverted from Miri to Kuching. On 14 December, most of the unit reinforced the artillery battery sent there as infantry on 12 December to pre-empt trouble from the Chinese of the Clandestine Communist Organisation (CCO) who were openly sympathetic to the Brunei rebels. The last company of 40 Commando landed near Seria. HMS Albion also provided helicopters from the embarked Naval Air Commando squadrons.

Major General Walter Walker took over as COMBRITBOR and Director of Operations (DOBOPS) on 19 December with command of all land, sea and air forces assigned to Borneo and reporting directly to the Commander-in-Chief Far East Forces, Admiral Sir David Luce. Three weeks after the rebellion started, 99th Gurkha Infantry Brigade had 5 infantry battalions and HQ 3rd Command Brigade was in Kuching. This force was supported by the Brunei Malay Regiment, the Sarawak Rangers, police of the three territories including paramilitary Police Field Force, and Harrisson's force of now 4,000 Dayaks. Suitable coastal patrol naval vessels were lacking (the Royal Navy didn't have any) so minesweepers were used. The RAF had medium and short range transport aircraft. In January, the Queen's Own Highlanders and 1/2 Gurkhas were replaced by the King's Own Yorkshire Light Infantry and 1/7 Gurkhas and special forces troops had also arrived.

Mopping up operations, by this time including a commando artillery battery with their guns, continued until May 1963. On 18 May, a patrol of 1/7 Gurkhas were guided by an informer to a camp in the mangrove. They flushed a party of rebels towards an ambush. Ten rebels were killed or captured. They were the remnants of TNKU headquarters and one of the wounded was Yassin Affandi.

However, on 12 April, the police station at Tebedu in the 1st Division of Sarawak was attacked and captured. The attackers had come from Kalimantan. This marked the beginning of confrontation.

== Aftermath ==
The failed rebellion destroyed any goals for democratic progress and ended Azahari's plan to establish the Unitary State of North Borneo. The revolt reinforced royal rule in Brunei, which instead opted for the path of a neo-traditional Malay monarchy. Four days into the rebellion, the government imposed a state of emergency, which has not been lifted since. Furthermore, when Britain granted Brunei independence on 1 January 1984, it did so without any safeguards for a representative form of government. The rebellion also played a role in Sultan Omar Ali Saifuddien III's subsequent decision for Brunei to not join the federation of Malaysia.

=== Order of Battle ===
The following units, or significant elements of them, deployed to Borneo in response to the rebellion before May 1963:

- 40 Commando Royal Marines
- 42 Commando Royal Marines
- Queen's Royal Irish Hussars
- 29th Commando Light Regiment Royal Artillery
- Queen's Own Highlanders
- King's Own Yorkshire Light Infantry
- 1st Green Jackets (43rd and 52nd)
- 22 Special Air Service
- 1st/2nd Gurkhas
- 1st/7th Gurkhas
